= List of magic tricks =

This article contains a list of magic tricks. In magic literature, tricks are often called effects. Based on published literature and marketed effects, there are millions of effects; a short performance routine by a single magician may contain dozens of such effects.

Some students of magic strive to refer to effects using a proper name, and also to properly attribute an effect to its creator. For example, consider an effect in which a magician shows four aces, and then the aces turn face up one at a time in a mysterious fashion. This effect, recognized as Twisting the Aces, is attributed to Dai Vernon, and it is based on a false count invented by Alex Elmsley. Some tricks are listed merely with their marketed name (particularly those sold as stand-alone tricks by retail dealers), whereas others are listed by the name given within magic publications.

== Magic tricks ==
- Assistant's Revenge
- Battle of the Barrels
- Bill in lemon
- Book test
- Bullet catch
- Cabinet escape
- Chinese linking rings
- Chinese Water Torture Cell
- Cut and restore rope trick
- David Copperfield's laser illusion
- Dove pan
- Devil's torture chamber
- Dismemberment
- Drill of Death
- Guillotine
- Impalement
- Indian rope trick
- Inexhaustible bottle
- Several varieties of levitation
- Miser's Dream
- Metamorphosis
- Needle-through-arm
- Origami
- Predicament escape
- Quick-change
- Radium Girl
- Sands of the Nile
- Several variations of sawing a woman in half, including the Zig Zag Girl and Mismade Girl
- Squeeze box (as created by André Kole)
- Table of death
- Thumper
- Wringer

== Close-up effects ==
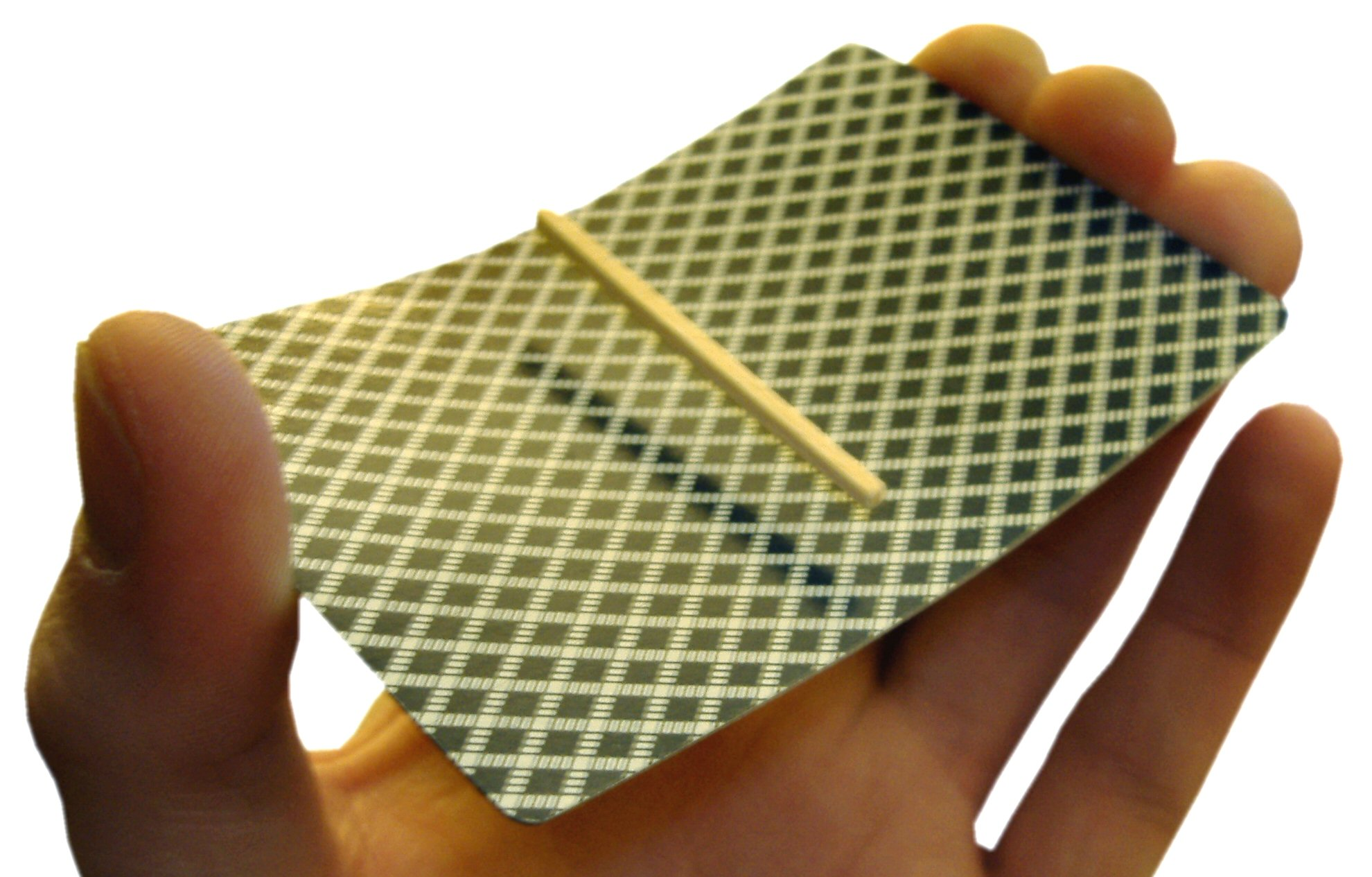
Floating match on card

The French drop.

- Ambitious Card
- Blackstone's Card Trick Without Cards
- Card warp
- Chink-a-chink
- The Circus Card Trick
- Cups and balls
- Detachable thumb
- Floating match on card
- French drop (the Tourniquet)
- Glorpy
- Hot foil trick
- Hummer card
- Needle Through Thumb
- Retention of vision vanish (pinch vanish)
- Scotch and soda
- The Four Burglars
- Three-card monte
- Zarrow shuffle

== Levitations ==
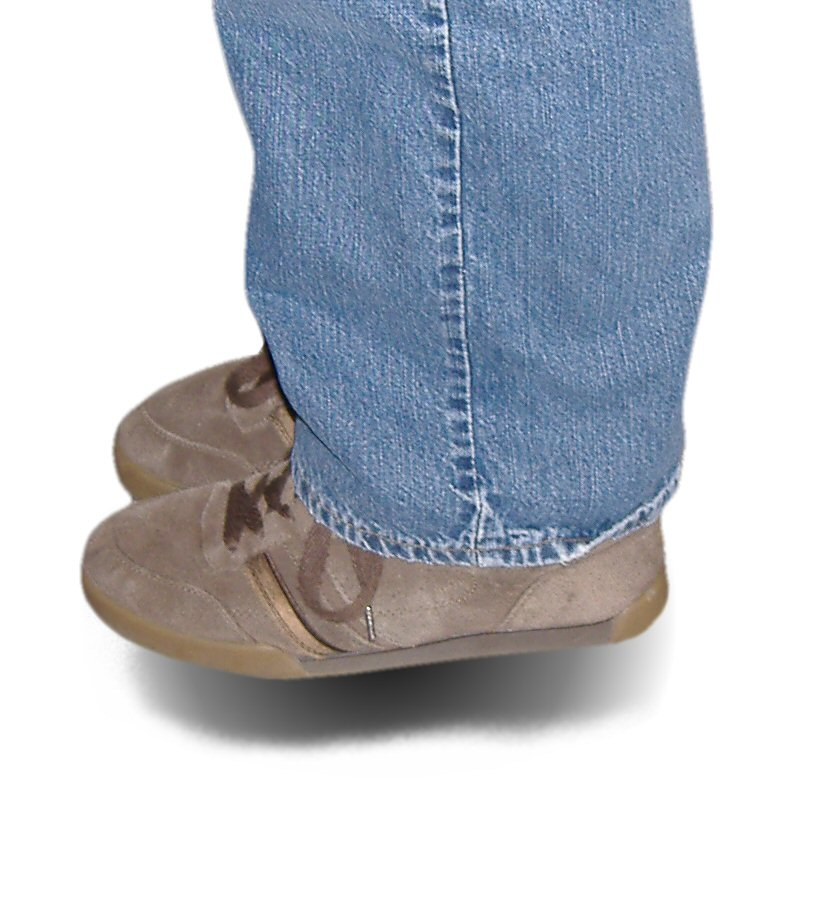
The king levitation being performed

- Asrah levitation
- Balducci levitation
- King levitation
- David Copperfield's flying illusion

== Utilities/accessories ==
Thousands of devices are used by magicians to accomplish their effects. However, most of the devices are never even seen by the audience during the performance of the trick(s). While not generally tricks themselves, some of these devices are very valuable to performers of magic.

- Topit
- Gibeciere
- Thumb tip

== See also ==
- List of card manipulation techniques
