= Outline of stage illusion =

Large-scale magic trick

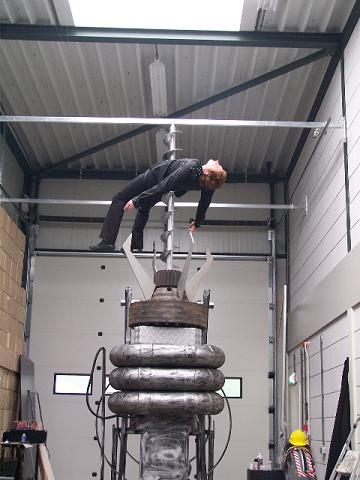
An example of a stage illusion, the Drill of Death performed by Christian Farla in 2008

A stage illusion is a large-scale magic trick. As the name implies, stage illusions are distinct from other types of magic in that they are performed a considerable distance away from the audience, usually on a stage, in order to maintain the illusion. Stage illusions usually use large props and may involve the use of assistants or large animals. Examples of stage illusions include sawing a woman in half and levitation. Stage illusion also refers to the field or career of performing stage illusions.

== Stage illusions ==
- Aquarian Illusion
- Asrah levitation
- Assistant's Revenge
- Balducci levitation
- Battle of the Barrels
- Bullet catch
- Cabinet escape
- David Copperfield's laser illusion
- Devil's torture chamber
- Guillotine
- Impalement
- Indian rope trick
- Levitation
- Metamorphosis
- Mismade Girl
- Origami
- Predicament escape
- Radium Girl
- Sawing a woman in half
- Squeeze Box Illusion
- Table of death
- Wringer
- Zig Zag Girl

== Famous stage illusionists ==
- Percy Abbott (1886–1960), Australian performer and stage magic dealer, co-founder of the Blackstone Magic Company with Harry Blackstone Sr. in 1927, co-founder of the Abbott Magic Company in 1934 (both established in Colon, Michigan, "the magic capital of the world")
- John Henry Anderson (1814–1874), Scottish magician known for introducing magic to large theatrical performances and especially for bullet catch performances
- Criss Angel (born 1967), American "post-modern illusionist" who performs in casual attire, Las Vegas headliner 2005–present, debunker of mediumship
- Harry Blackstone Sr. (1885–1965), American illusionist who performed in formal attire, known for levitation, impalement, sawing a woman in half, vanishing a bird cage, producing bouquets of flowers, and levitating a glowing light bulb, resided on an island near Colon, Michigan
- Harry Blackstone Jr. (1934–1997), American son of Harry Blackstone Sr., performed classic magic acts similar to his father's, wrote books and produced best-selling magic trick sets
- David Blaine (David Blaine White, born 1973), American performer known especially for endurance stunts, active 1997–present
- Lance Burton (born 1960), American stage magician who rose to fame as a teenager in 1977 and was a headline performer in Las Vegas from 1981 to 2010
- Leslie George Cole (a.k.a. Les Levante, 1892–1978), Australian performer known for invention of an impalement illusion
- David Copperfield (David Kotkin, born 1956), American performer described by Forbes as the most commercially successful magician in history, headliner in numerous television specials and Las Vegas performances since 1977, recognized by 21 Emmy Awards, known for very large-scale illusions
- Paul Daniels (1938–2016), English star of the BBC television series The Paul Daniels Magic Show 1979–1994, combined magic with comedy
- Dante the Great (Oscar Eliason, 1869–1899), American performer from a Mormon pioneer family in Utah who later performed in Australasia, debunker of spiritualism
- Dante the Magician (Harry August Jansen, 1883–1955), Danish-born American vaudeville and early film and television performer, named himself after Dante the Great
- David Devant (David Wighton, 1868–1941), English performer known for suave and witty presentation of stage illusions, early film performer
- Fakir of Ava (Isaiah Hughes, 1813–1891), English-American teacher of Harry Kellar
- Ching Ling Foo (Chee Ling Qua, 1854–1922), Chinese magician who later performed in the United States and became the first modern East Asian magician to achieve world fame, known for a beheading trick and production of a large bowl of water from an empty cloth
- Robert Harbin (1908–1978), South African inventor of the Zig-Zag Girl, the Aztec Lady and other illusions, debuted in London theatres in 1932 and on BBC TV in 1937, also became an expert and author on origami
- Robert Heller (William Henry Palmer, 1826–1878), English magician known for stage performances c. 1855, associate of Harry Kellar and follower of Jean Eugène Robert-Houdin
- Doug Henning (1947–2000), Canadian magician who came to prominence with The Magic Show, a musical play which ran 1974–1978 on Broadway in New York City, and starred in television special performances 1975–1982
- Alexander and Adelaide Hermann (1844–1896 and 1853–1932), French and English husband-and-wife performers, Alexander being the younger brother and protégé of Carl Hermann
- Carl Hermann (Compars Herrmann, 1816–1887), older brother of Alexander Hermann, German stage magician who performed in London and copied some of his illusions from Jean-Eugène Robert-Houdin
- Carl Hertz (Louis or Leib Morgenstein, 1859–1924), American stage and early film performer, known for levitating a dancing girl, vanishing a bird, and having his wife enter a furnace without harm, debunker of mediumship and spiritualism
- Harry Houdini (Erik Weisz, 1874–1926), Hungarian-American performer, especially known as an escape artist and debunker of spiritualism, named himself after Jean-Eugène Robert-Houdin
- Émile and Vincent Isola (1860–1945 and 1862–1947), the Isola Brothers, Algerian performers in Paris who embraced the development of film cinema technology
- Harry Kellar (Heinrich Keller, 1849–1922), American major stage performer, protégé of Fakir of Ava (Isaiah Hughes), known as the "Dean of American Magicians"
- John Nevil Maskelyne (1839–1917), inventor of a levitation method later incorrectly credited to Jean-Eugène Robert-Houdin or Harry Kellar, debunker of spiritualism, father and grandfather of well-known stage magicians Nevil Maskelyne (1863–1924) and Jasper Maskelyne (1902–1973)
- Georges Méliès (1861–1938), French stage magician and pioneer of filmmaking, especially producing trick films
- The Pendragons (Jonathan and Charlotte Pendragon), known for strongly physical, choreographed performances and new variations of classic illusions in television appearances c. 1994–2009 (divorced in 2012)
- Penn & Teller (Penn Jillette and Raymond Joseph Teller, born 1955 and 1948), American comedy magic duo since the late 1970s, the longest-running headliners to play at the same hotel in Las Vegas history
- James Randi (Randall Zwinge, 1928–2020), Canadian-American stage and television performer who later devoted himself to skeptical investigation of paranormal, occult, and supernatural claims
- Richiardi Jr (Aldo Izquierdo Colosi, 1923–1985), Peruvian illusionist known for dramatic and gory stage presentations of classic stage illusions, credited for influence and mastery by Criss Angel and David Copperfield
- Jean-Eugène Robert-Houdin (1805–1871), often credited as the father of the modern style of magic performance, performed in formal attire
- P. T. Selbit (1881–1938), English magician credited with being the first to perform the illusion of sawing a woman in half (in 1920 or 1921)
- Siegfried & Roy (Siegfried Fischbacher and Uwe "Roy" Horn, 1939–2021 and 1944–2020), German-American magic duo known for performances with big cats – especially white lions and white tigers, Las Vegas performers starting in 1967 and headlining 1981–2003, ceasing to perform after Roy Horn was critically injured in an onstage tiger attack
- Silvan (Aldo Savoldello, born 1937), Italian illusionist, became popular in 1973 with a television show on RAI in Italy, continues to perform at age 87 as of early 2025
- Chung Ling Soo (William Ellsworth Robinson, 1861–1918), American (non-Asian) magician who performed as a character similar to Ching Ling Foo and later died from a failed bullet catch trick
- P. C. Sorcar (1913–1971), Indian television illusionist with a flamboyant style, father of P. C. Sorcar Jr.
- P. C. Sorcar Jr. (born 1946), Indian illusionist known for making iconic landmarks disappear, such as the Taj Mahal, son of P. C. Sorcar
- Jim Steinmeyer (born 1958), American designer of illusions performed primarily by other magicians such as David Copperfield, Doug Henning, Siegfried & Roy, and Lance Burton
- Howard Thurston (1869–1936) American headliner of the largest traveling magic show of its time, known especially for his presentation skill in performing levitation, influenced by Alexander Herrmann, partnered with Harry Kellar
- Mark Wilson (1929–2021), American known as the first major television magician, appearing in the United States in a local show in 1955 and debuting nationally in The Magic Land of Allakazam in 1960
