= List of Breaking the Magician's Code: Magic's Biggest Secrets Finally Revealed episodes =

This is a list of Breaking the Magician's Code: Magic's Biggest Secrets Finally Revealed episodes.

== Legend ==
- — Illusions originally exclusive to the VHS release and now available online.

† — Filmed at the Van de Kamp Bakery Building (Glassell Park).
¶ — Filmed outside the 516 South Anderson Street warehouse.
§ — Filmed at the Rose Bowl Stadium parking lot (Pasadena).
◊ — Filmed at Pecan Pool (Boyle Heights).
Note: Illusions without a symbol were filmed inside the 516 South Anderson Street warehouse, except the 2007 "Secrets of Street Magic Revealed" special, filmed at unknown locations in the United States.

== Original Specials (1997–1998) ==
The original 1997–1998 specials all featured Val Valentino as the masked magician.

Episode	Air dates	List of Illusions Revealed
Episode One; Magic's Biggest Secrets Finally Revealed 1	November 24, 1997 (US); September 19, 2010 (HK)	1. Lady to Tiger; 2. Chinese Lantern; 3. Levitation; 4. Exploding Packing Crate; 5. Zig Zag Girl; 6. Chinese Linking Rings; 7. Metamorphosis; 8. Sawing a Woman in Half (Selbit's Sawing); 9. Pulling a Rabbit Out of a Hat; 10. Sword Basket; 11. Vanishing Elephant; 12. Woman in the Painting *; 13. Noah's Ark *
Episode Two; Magic's Biggest Secrets Finally Revealed 2	March 3, 1998 (US); September 26, 2010 (HK)	1. Crusher; 2. Teleportation; 3. Lady of Steel; 4. Vanishing Scarves; 5. Walking Through a Solid Brick Wall; 6. Suit of Armor; 7. Shooting an Arrow Through a Woman; 8. Switching Places; 9. Disappearing Doves; 10. Box of Pain; 11. Water Torture Escape
Episode Three; Magic's Biggest Secrets Finally Revealed 3	May 5, 1998 (US); October 3, 2010 (HK)	1. Bed of Spikes; 2. The Stretch; 3. Daggers of Death; 4. Disappearing Scarf; 5. The Haunted House; 6. Disappearing Radio; 7. Bullet Catch; 8. Turning Water Into Ice; 9. Mismatch Girl; 10. Vanishing Tank †
Episode Four – Unmasking the Magician: The Final Reveal; Magic's Biggest Secrets Finally Revealed 4	October 29, 1998 (US); October 10, 2010 (HK)	1. Car Crusher Escape; 2. Cremation; 3. Spike Torture; 4. Guillotine; 5. Buried Alive †; 6. Pincushion Thumb; 7. Death Trap †; 8. The Cannon and the Crate *

== Escape From the Ice (2002 Special) ==
Magic's Biggest Secrets Finally Revealed 5 – Escape From the Ice

This standalone special was produced after the original 1997–1998 run and featured a different masked magician, as Val Valentino did not appear.

Episode	Air dates	List of Illusions Revealed
Episode Five	May 15, 2002 (US); October 17, 2010 (HK)	1. Sawing Through a Woman with a Buzz Saw; 2. Making an Assistant Disappear; 3. Broom Suspension; 4. Going Through the Portal; 5. Disappearing Dumptruck (With Spectators); 6. Spike Torture Escape (Cage of Doom); 7. Making a Table Float without Strings or Magnets; 8. Frozen Alive

== Secrets of Street Magic Revealed (2007 Special) ==
Street Magic's Biggest Secrets Finally Revealed

Secrets of Street Magic Revealed (also known internationally as Street Magic's Biggest Secrets Finally Revealed) featured a different masked performer and aired as a standalone special in 2007.

Special	Air date	List of Illusions Revealed
Secrets of Street Magic Revealed; Street Magic's Biggest Secrets Finally Revealed	September 2007	1. Ash in Palm; 2. Vanishing Coin; 3. Riffle Force (Long Card); 4. Arm Twist; 5. The Raising Card; 6. Mind Reading (Number Trick); 7. The Switch (Card Trick); 8. Street Magician's Prediction (Swami Gimmick); 9. Ash Reveal Prediction; 10. The Dead Fly Resurrection; 11. The Time Machine Gimmick; 12. Telekinesis; 13. Cigarette Through Coin; 14. Dove Decapitation; 15. Street Levitation

== Series Revival (2008 - 2009) ==
Val Valentino returned as the masked magician for the 2008 revival series.

Episode	Air dates	List of Illusions Revealed
Episode One; Magic's Biggest Secrets Finally Revealed	October 2, 2008 (US); June 13, 2010 (HK)	1. Death Saw; 2. Vanishing Toothpick; 3. Cut and Restore Rope; 4. De Kolta Chair; 5. Penetrate Rubber Sheet With a Coin; 6. Bentley → Lamborghini transformation (featuring WWE Divas Eve Torres and Maria Kanellis); 7. Floating Soda Can; 8. Making a String Quartet Disappear; 9. Penetrate Glass Bottle With Bottle Cap; 10. Passing Through a Steel Wall
Episode Two; Magic's Biggest Secrets Finally Revealed	October 6, 2008 (US); June 20, 2010 (HK)	1. Making a Girl Vanish from a Table; 2. Rising Card Trick; 3. Levitating a Girl on a Floating Table; 4. Recycle Empty Soda Can; 5. Dismemberment; 6. Trap Spirit in Handkerchief; 7. Making a Girl Appear from Clothing; 8. Needle Through Forearm; 9. Making an Elephant Appear (surrounded by spectators)
Episode Three; Magic's Biggest Secrets Finally Revealed	October 13, 2008 (US); June 27, 2010 (HK)	1. Head Being Cut off by a Guillotine; 2. Penny Penetrating Solid Glass; 3. Making a Girl Appear/Disappear from a Cabinet; 4. Cut String In A Straw; 5. Houdini's Milk Can Escape; 6. Flower Out Of Pan; 7. Making Dancers Disappear from a Stage; 8. Chain Through Neck; 9. Levitating from the Warehouse roof to the ground ¶
Episode Four; Magic's Biggest Secrets Finally Revealed	October 20, 2008 (US); July 11, 2010 (HK)	1. Making a Bomb Squad Car Disappear; 2. Bringing Dead Fly Back To Life; 3. Passing Car Registration Through Car Windshield ¶; 4. Assistant's Revenge; 5. Sawing a Girl in Half in a Torture Device (Iron Egg); 6. Solve Math Problem Using Spirits; 7. Sticking a Rose Through a Girl; 8. Biting Coin in Half; 9. Passing Through a Turbofan
Episode Five; Magic's Biggest Secrets Finally Revealed	November 3, 2008 (US); July 18, 2010 (HK)	1. Making a Woman Disappear From a Cabinet and Reappear Somewhere Else; 2. Floating Zombie Ball; 3. Cigarette Through Half Dollar; 4. Passing Through a Metal Plate; 5. The Twister; 6. Bending Spoon With The Mind; 7. Impaling a Woman With a Sword; 8. Pass Cigarette Ash Through Hand; 9. Surviving Being Cut Up in a Wood Chipper ¶
Episode Six; Magic's Biggest Secrets Finally Revealed	November 10, 2008 (US); July 25, 2010 (HK)	1. Teleporting From One Oil Drum to Another; 2. Floating Bill; 3. Topsy-Turvy; 4. Slice Into Arm With A Knife; 5. Magically Writing On a Slate Board; 6. Cutting a Girl In Three; 7. Pierce Sealed Can With Coin; 8. Teleportation
Episode Seven; Magic's Biggest Secrets Finally Revealed	November 17, 2008 (US); August 1, 2010 (HK)	1. Levitating a Girl on a Table; 2. Turning Burned Paper into Bill; 3. Making Girls Appear in a Crystal Cylinder; 4. Determine Randomly Selected Crayon; 5. "Twilight Zone" Door; 6. Disembodied Princess; 7. Pierce Water Bottle With Mobile Phone; 8. Impaling a Girl on a Spike
Episode Eight; Magic's Biggest Secrets Finally Revealed	November 24, 2008 (US); August 8, 2010 (HK)	1. Houdini's Magic Trunk; 2. Convert Smaller Pieces of Thread Into One Piece; 3. Making a Girl's Middle Disappear; 4. Flaming Thumb; 5. Evil Spirit Pyramid – Conjuring Spirits; 6. Crushing a Light Bulb; 7. Catching a Selected Card in the Air with a Sword; 8. Escaping the Spinning Blades of Death
Episode Nine; Magic's Biggest Secrets Finally Revealed	February 7, 2009 (UK); April 20, 2009 (US); August 15, 2010 (HK)	1. Magic Barrel (Through the Eye of a Needle); 2. Houdini's Fish Bowl; 3. Playing Card Through Street Window; 4. Asrah levitation 5. Making Girls Appear On a Pedestal; 6. Bending Spoon With Mind; 7. Holding Breath Under Water For 18 Minutes
Episode Ten; Magic's Biggest Secrets Finally Revealed	February 9, 2009 (UK); April 27, 2009 (US); August 22, 2010 (HK)	1. Making a 1200cc Motorbike Disappear in Mid Air; 2. Fishing For a Playing Card Selected by Volunteer; 3. Piercing a Balloon; 4. Spinning a Girl Upside Down; 5. Spirit Room with Disappearing Medium; 6. Levitating a Foot off the Floor; 7. Swallowing a Needle; 8. Magic Light Bulb; 9. Making a 5 Ton Military Vehicle Appear From Nowhere §
Episode Eleven; Magic's Biggest Secrets Finally Revealed	February 14, 2009 (UK); May 4, 2009 (US); August 29, 2010 (HK)	1. Woman Vanishes From Steel Plate In Mid Air; 2. Burning Selected Card Value Into Skin; 3. Crushing A Woman With A Steel Plunger; 4. Sawing A Woman In Half Vertically; 5. Recreating Random Drawing by Volunteer; 6. Transformation Of Skeleton To Dummy To A Girl; 7. Tying Shoe Laces Without Touching Them; 8. Floating Through A Solid Steel Frame (No Wires); 9. Changing Handkerchief Color By Passing Through Hand; 10. Penetrating A Plate Glass Window Without Shattering It
Episode Twelve; Magic's Biggest Secrets Finally Revealed	February 16, 2009 (UK); May 11, 2009 (US); September 3, 2010 (HK)	1. Producing Girls From Within Triangle Screen; 2. Making Coins Appear In a Cup of Coffee; 3. Making Live Birds Appear And Vanish From Boxes; 4. Cutting Cards To Pieces and Back Together Again; 5. Crushing A Woman And Putting Tube Through Her Body; 6. Visibly Decapitating A Woman With A French Guillotine; 7. Burned Paper With Word Written By Volunteer Appears on Arm; 8. Turning a 1 Dollar Bill into a 50 Dollar Bill; 9. 16 Ton Trolley Car Levitates And Disappears
Episode Thirteen; Magic's Biggest Secrets Finally Revealed	February 21, 2009 (UK); May 18, 2009 (US); September 12, 2010 (HK)	1. Making A Girl Vanish In A Giant Game Of Three Card Monte; 2. Water Not Falling Out of Upside Down Glass; 3. Creating A Woman From A Cloud Of Smoke; 4. Hand Being Cut Off In Guillotine; 5. Dividing A Woman In Three And Head Over Heels; 6. Smash and Stab; 7. Moving Holes in a Playing Card; 8. Multum in Parvo; 9. Walking On Water (Surrounded By Spectators) ◊

== Australian version ==
The Australian version is a broadcast of the American production, featuring local narration and minor edits.

Episode	Air dates	List of Illusions Revealed
Episode One; Magic's Biggest Secrets Finally Revealed	June 14, 2010	1. Death Saw; 2. Levitating a Girl on a Floating Table; 3. Making a String Quartet Disappear; 4. Making a Girl Appear from Clothing; 5. Passing Through a Steel Wall
Episode Two; Magic's Biggest Secrets Finally Revealed	June 21, 2010	1. Head Being Cut off by a Guillotine; 2. Making a Girl Appear/Disappear from a Cabinet; 3. Houdini Milk Can Escape; 4. Knife Russian Roulette; 5. Chain Through Neck; 6. Penetrating A Plate Glass Window Without Shattering the Glass
Episode Three; Magic's Biggest Secrets Finally Revealed	July 4, 2010	1. Making a Woman Disappear From a Cabinet and Reappear Somewhere Else; 2. Impaling a Woman With a Sword; 3. Passing Through a Steel Plate; 4. The Twister; 5. Surviving Being Cut Up in a Wood Chipper ¶
Episode Four; Magic's Biggest Secrets Finally Revealed	July 11, 2010	1. Crushing A Woman With A Steel Plunger; 2. Assistant's Revenge; 3. Sawing a Girl in Half in a Torture Device; 4. Sticking a Rose Through a Girl; 5. Passing Through a Turbofan
Episode Three (Australian Re‑edit); Magic's Biggest Secrets Finally Revealed This is the same content as Episode Three above, but the illusions appear in a different order and the narration is re‑recorded for the Australian broadcast.	July 18, 2010	1. Making a Woman Disappear From a Cabinet and Reappear Somewhere Else; 2. Passing Through a Steel Plate; 3. The Twister; 4. Impaling a Woman With a Sword; 5. Surviving Being Cut Up in a Wood Chipper ¶
Episode Five; Magic's Biggest Secrets Finally Revealed	July 25, 2010	1. Teleporting From One Oil Drum to Another; 2. Topsy-Turvy; 3. Magically Writing On a Slate Board; 4. Cutting a Girl In Three; 5. Teleportation
Episode Six; Magic's Biggest Secrets Finally Revealed	August 1, 2010	1. Levitating a Girl on a Table; 2. Making Girls Appear in a Crystal Cylinder; 3. "Twilight Zone" Door; 4. Disembodied Princess; 5. Impaling a Girl on a Spike
Episode Seven; Magic's Biggest Secrets Finally Revealed	August 8, 2010	1. Houdini's Magic Trunk; 2. Making a Girl's Middle Disappear; 3. Evil Spirit Pyramid – Conjuring Spirits; 4. Catching a Selected Card in the Air with a Sword; 5. Escaping the Blades of Death
Episode Eight; Magic's Biggest Secrets Finally Revealed	August 15, 2010	1. Magic Barrel (Through the Eye of a Needle); 2. Houdini's Fish Bowl; 3. Playing Card Through Street Window; 4. Asrah levitation 5. Making Girls Appear In Mid Air; 6. Holding Breath Under Water For 18 Minutes
Episode Nine; Magic's Biggest Secrets Finally Revealed	August 22, 2010	1. Making a 1200cc Motorbike Disappear in Mid Air; 2. Spinning a Girl Upside Down; 3. Spirit Room with Disappearing Medium; 4. Levitating a Foot off the Floor; 5. Making a 5 Ton Military Vehicle Appear From Nowhere §
Episode Ten; Magic's Biggest Secrets Finally Revealed	August 29, 2010	1. Woman Vanishes From Steel Plate In Mid Air; 2. Crushing A Woman With A Steel Plunger; 3. Transformation Of Skeleton To Dummy To A Girl; 4. Floating Through A Solid Steel Frame (No Wires); 5. Penetrating A Plate Glass Window Without Shattering It
Episode Eleven; Magic's Biggest Secrets Finally Revealed	September 5, 2010	1. Producing Girls From Within Triangle Screen; 2. Making Live Birds Appear And Vanish From Boxes; 3. Crushing A Woman And Putting Tube Through Her Body; 4. 16 Ton Trolley Car Levitates And Disappears
Episode Twelve; Magic's Biggest Secrets Finally Revealed	September 12, 2010	1. Making A Girl Vanish In A Giant Game Of Three Card Monte; 2. Water Not Falling Out of Upside Down Glass; 3. Creating A Woman From A Cloud Of Smoke; 4. Hand Being Cut Off In Guillotine; 5. Dividing A Woman In Three And Head Over Heels; 6. Smash and Stab; 7. Moving Holes in a Playing Card; 8. Multum in Parvo; 9. Walking On Water (Surrounded By Spectators) ◊
