= Chinese rings =

Chinese rings may refer to:

- Baguenaudier, also known as the Chinese rings, a disentanglement puzzle
- Chinese linking rings, a magic trick
- Iron rings, pieces of Chinese martial arts equipment

== See also ==
- Chinese ring (disambiguation)
