= Chinese ring =

Chinese ring may refer to:

- Lei tai, a Chinese fighting arena
- Shang huan, a Chinese intrauterine device
- The Chinese Ring, a 1947 American film

== See also ==
- Chinese rings (disambiguation)
