= Moi-Yo Miller =

Australian magician's assistant (1914–2018)

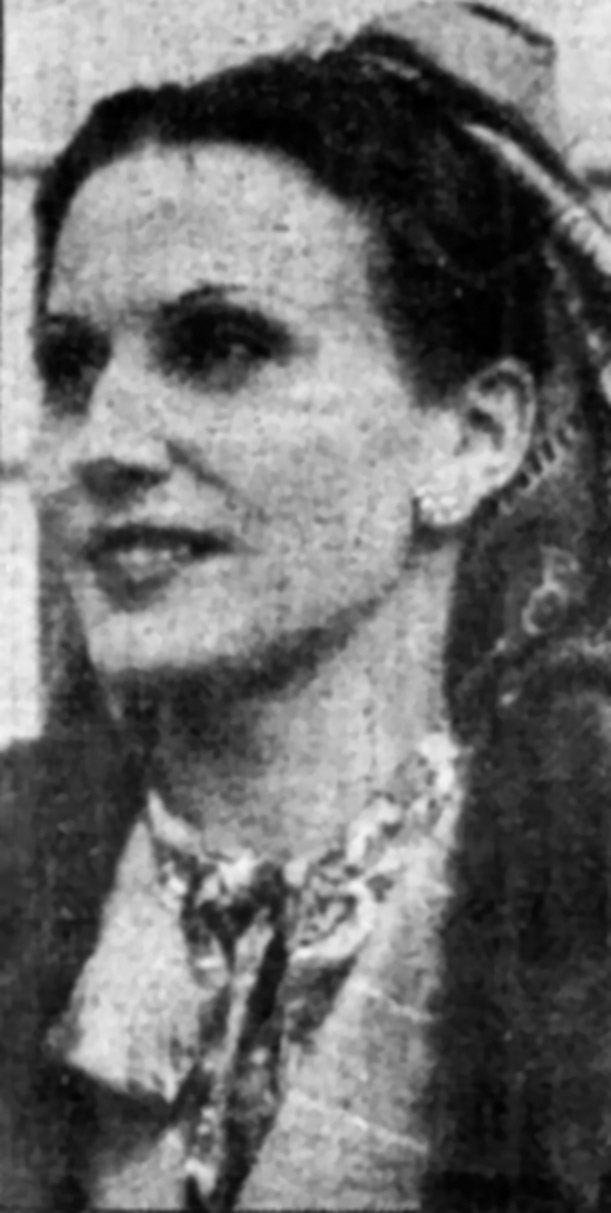
- Miller in 1948
- Born: Mona Loretta Miller; 24 April 1914; Geelong, Victoria, Australia
- Died: 18 September 2018 (aged 104); Prahran, Victoria, Australia
- Occupations: Illusionist, magic assistant
- Employer: Dante the Magician

Mona Loretta Miller (24 April 1914 – 18 September 2018), better known by the stage name Moi-Yo Miller, was an Australian entertainer who toured the world as a magician's assistant and illusionist of the stage magician Dante (AKA Harry Jansen), during the 1930s and 1940s.

== Biography ==
Miller was born in Geelong. She first met Dante while still in her late teens when she was appearing in a musical revue in Melbourne. Dante had decided to recruit an Australian girl as an assistant because, in his words, he "saw in Melbourne more beautiful women per square block than he had seen in any other part of the World".

Miller dated Dante's son, Bill, and went on to work with Dante, staying with him for the rest of his performing career. She very quickly became his main assistant and an integral part of his show Sim Sala Bim. She was often billed as "Australia's Most Beautiful Woman". She once estimated that she had been sawed in half around 11,800 times during her career.

Miller became highly regarded among professional magic performers and is widely cited as one of the all-time great magic assistants. She features in the 2008 documentary movie, Women in Boxes, which explores the vital role of assistants in magic. In 1993 she received the Dragon Award presented by the J. Marberger Stuart Foundation. She celebrated her 100th birthday in 2014. A public art mural of Miller's face was created by artist Michael Cassar in June 2016 on the corner of James Street and Minns Lane, Geelong.
