= Battle of the Barrels =

The Battle of the Barrels is a transportation illusion also known as Barricaded Barrels, Through the Eye of the Needle or the Black and White Barrels.

The illusion consists of two topless/bottomless barrels openly displayed on castered open framework supports. An assistant then climbs inside a barrel and wooden bulls-eye targets are affixed to either end of the barrel. The second barrel is shown empty, sealed on one end and with four solid metal bars fixed across the other end.

The end of the assistant's barrel is placed against the barred opening of the empty barrel for a brief moment. As the barrels are again separated, the assistant can now be seen through the four solid metal bars, inside the barrel she was not in before.

The illusion was invented by P. T. Selbit. His original version consisted of two upright barrels and, the instead of the centre target through which the assistant passed through, Selbit used a cast iron manhole/drain cover. Since this upright version required on-stage winch facilities, later performers such as Dante made the effect more practical and fast-paced by putting the barrels on the horizontal trucks and using wooden targets.
