= Erix Logan =

Italian-born Canadian magician and illusionist

Erix Logan (born September, 1969 in Brescia, Italy) is the stage name of Enrico Del Buono, a magician and illusionist who performs worldwide. He currently lives in Mississauga, Ontario, Canada.

== Early years ==
Throughout his childhood Logan always stated that he would become a professional entertainer. When he was 16 years old he spent the summer touring along the Italian beaches with a street art company. After convincing his former assistant Silvia Gaffurini of his grand illusions in 1985 was able to start his professional career. Over the next five years he would add material to his program until making his first international debut on board a luxury cruise ship in 1990. For the next three years he sailed around the world, setting the ground for his leap toward his full touring show which stills run today.

== Performing career ==
=== Live Shows ===
The first production took place in Helsinki, Finland and it was named "Erix Logan World of Magic", followed by one year in Seoul, South Korea, with the show "Royal Magic"; then "The Space Illusion" in Fukuoka, Japan. In those works Logan was focusing on the quality of the illusions, he invented and developed; but from the year 2000 he started developing a more spiritual and philosophical vision of the art of magic and its connection with the expectations and reactions of peoples.

His latest shows carry a deep impression of this path. An example is "MistEriX", which explores the 3 levels of human perceptions, value of tradition, and the continuity of the magical heritage with the history of magic as well as their leaders.

"My Magic" is a family-oriented film that depicts the rise of its protagonist from humble beginnings and explores how personal choices shape one's life.

The latest creation "The Magic Of", launched in 2016, connects magic with other forms of entertainment, such as live songs, dance, beatbox and freestyle in a new mix with magic.

=== Television ===
Italy: Domenica Live, Detto Fatto, Zelig Circus, Buona Domenica, Torno Sabato, Carramba che Sorpresa, Usa la Testa, Circo Massimo, Planet, 39^ Zecchino d'oro, Stranamore, Buona Fortuna, I giovani Incontrano L'Europa, Sognando Las Vegas, La Vita in Diretta

France: Le Plus Grand Cabaret du Monde, Sebastien c’est fous, VII - XII and XX MANDRAKES D'OR

International: "Surpriza Surpriza" (Romania), "47 Festival de Viña del Mar" (Chile), "Bravo!" (Greece), "Sorpresa, Sorpresa" (Spain), "El tiempo es oro" (Chile), "Tilt!" (Switzerland), "Superpop!" (Slovenia), "Hokus-Pokus" and "En-Büyük-Show" (Turkey), "CW Network (USA)

== Awards and most notable events ==
- Three times recipient of Mandrake D'Or from the "Académie Fançaise de l'illusionisme"
- Milbourne Christopher Award – Most Promising Newcomer
- European Champions of Magic at Lido in Paris
- Robert Houdin Trophy from the City of Blois and Musée de la Magie
- Prix Jury Jr. Grands Prix Magique de Monte-Carlo
- 100 Years of Magig at the Palladium in London
- Opening ceremony of Viña del Mar Song Festival
- Golden Magic 2016 – Moscow and St.Petersburg
- Magic Castle - Hollywood
- Friedrichstadtpalast Berlin
- Stars of Magic - Istanbul
- Les Folies du Lac - Valence

== Private life ==
Erix Logan shares the stage with Sara Tosi (Sara Maya). They got married in Las Vegas in 2005. The marriage has been also officially registered under the Italian law. They have no children but a dog which is an integral part of their family. He is a Pomeranian named Bartolo.

== See also ==
- Impaled (illusion)
