= Needle Through Thumb =

Magic trick

The needle through thumb is the name of a magic trick which is meant to give the illusion that the magician is actually stabbing his own thumb using several sewing needles.

== Effect ==
The performer shows their thumb to the audience, showing that it is not simply a fake thumb. They then cover their thumb with a handkerchief. They take out a sewing needle, and show it to the audience in order to prove that it is not fake. The magician slowly stabs the first needle into his thumb. The process continues until the magician's thumb has so many needles that they cannot take it anymore. They take out the needles one by one, and then remove the handkerchief, showing that the thumb has magically become healed.

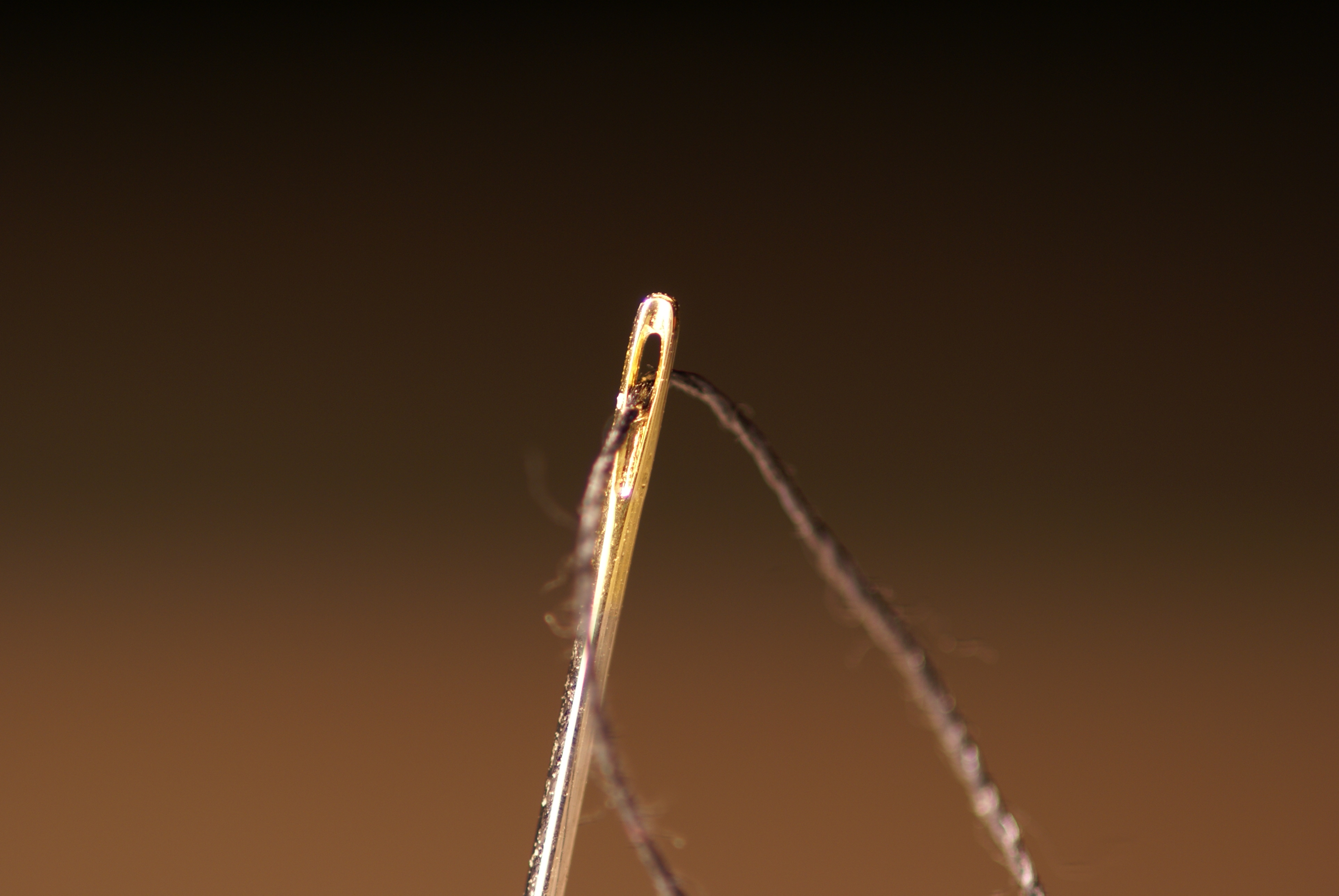
Sewing needles that are used in this magic trick.

== History ==
This trick was seen in the once seen special on Fox known as Breaking the Magician's Code: Magic's Biggest Secrets Finally Revealed. The trick was shown by magician Val Valentino.

== See also ==
- Needle-through-arm
