= Floating match on card =

Illusion

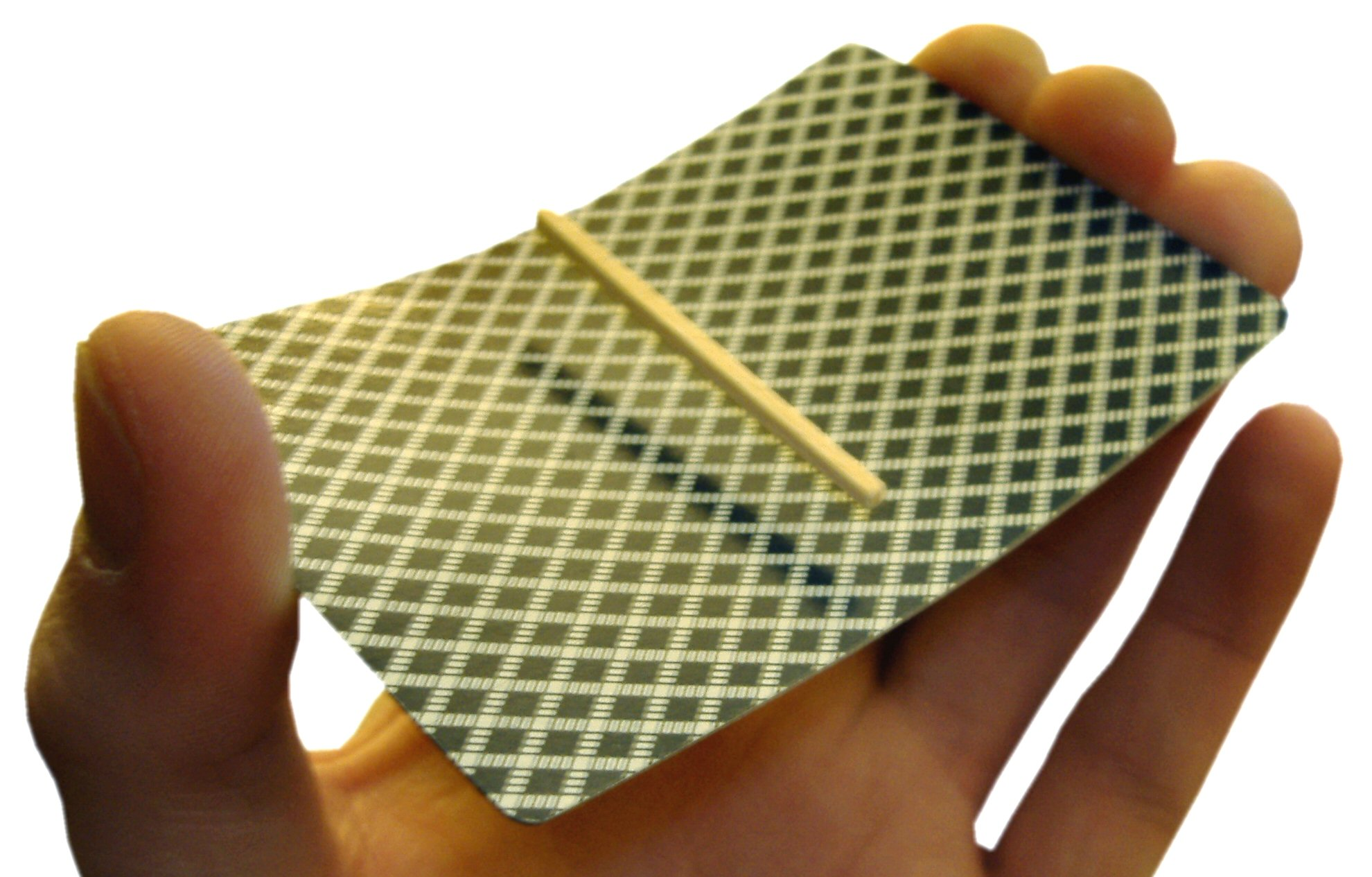
The match appears to float above the card

The floating match is a magic trick in which a matchstick appears to float over a playing card.

This effect was originally created by Ben Harris. Over the years, many copies of the effect have been made. Most of them include a pre-made gimmicked card to be used for the effect. Matthew Field of The Magic Circular described it in 2008 as "one of the two or three most ripped-off tricks in magic".
