= Hot foil trick =

Magic trick

The hot foil trick is a magic trick in which the magician places a small piece of tin or aluminium foil in a volunteer's hand, and the foil begins to rapidly increase in temperature until the volunteer has to drop it to avoid scalding their hand, and the foil is reduced to ashes on the ground. This effect is achieved by, shortly before performing the trick, surreptitiously exposing the foil to a chemical (such as mercury(II) chloride) which will cause it to rapidly oxidise. This trick can be very dangerous, since many of the chemicals used to perform it are highly toxic; mercury(II) chloride was at one point commonly sold in magic stores in the United States, but as of 2009 most such shops had stopped stocking it due to its toxic nature.
