= Clearly Impossible =

Magic illusion by Jonathan Pendragon

Clearly Impossible is a variation of the illusion of sawing a woman in half devised by Jonathan Pendragon.

== Description ==
The illusion is very similar in principle and performance to the older "Thin Model" versions of sawing a woman in half, with the exception that the boxes used to cover the assistant being divided are clear, rather than opaque. In basic concept, it is very similar to the transparent sawing developed by Les Arnold in the late 1970s. However, in the Pendragons version, the boxes are much smaller, and are never covered at any point during the illusion. As a result, the assistant within the boxes remains in full view throughout, making this a particularly baffling illusion for the audience.

=== Performance ===
The illusion usually begins with the magician showing the audience a low table, designed to split into two halves. The main assistant is then introduced, and lies down on the table. Other assistants then place two boxes over the assistant, with clear sides and tops. As the upper box is placed over them, the main assistant extends their arm out of the open side of the box, while their head and feet extend out of the ends of the two boxes. Small stocks are then used to restrain the assistant's feet and neck. Because the boxes have clear sides, the audience is able to see right through them, and can see that the assistant has not curled up inside the upper box, as is described in many commonly available magic books for the "Thin Model" sawing.

The magician then cuts through the box using either a saw or sword (although some performers skip this step), and dividers are placed into the box either side of the cut. With the dividers in place, the two halves of the table are unlocked and pulled apart. As the assistant has been in full view of the audience throughout the illusion, it appears that they have been separated into two halves, the impossibility of this situation helping to give the illusion its name. The halves of the table are then pushed back together, the dividers removed, and the unharmed assistant released from the stocks and boxes.

== Notable performances ==
During her relationship with illusionist David Copperfield, supermodel Claudia Schiffer often assisted Copperfield in his stage shows as a "special guest assistant". Part of these shows was a performance of Clearly Impossible, with Schiffer as the assistant being sawed in half by Copperfield. When Schiffer was unavailable to assist Copperfield, he performed the illusion assisted by her fellow supermodel Cindy Crawford.

During the 1996 TV special Champions of Magic, Jonathan Pendragon performed the illusion on the show's host, Princess Stéphanie of Monaco.

In November 2004, singer Shania Twain appeared on the BBC charity telethon Children in Need as a celebrity assistant in a magic act, being sawed in half in a performance of Clearly Impossible.

While appearing on a local TV talk show during a promotional visit to Japan in 2006, actress Mischa Barton took part in a performance of the illusion in which she was sawed in half by a local magician.

Italian singer Sabrina Salerno assisted illusionist Martin in a televised performance of Clearly Impossible.

While presenting SM:TV Live, British TV presenter Cat Deeley was the first British celebrity to be sawed in half in a version of Clearly Impossible.

During a promotional visit to Europe, Jessica Simpson participated in a performance of the illusion where she was sawed in half by illusionist Hans Klok, who used a large circular saw to divide her in two.

When she appeared on a Mexican talk show, Penélope Cruz took part in a performance of this illusion.

Zoe Salmon took part in a performance of the illusion in an episode of Blue Peter.

In July 2015, magician Murray SawChuck performed the illusion on actress Alicia Witt in an episode of the Amazon Prime series Street magic. The illusion was performed on a public street and "in the round", completely surrounded by the audience.

In October 2019, during an appearance on the BBC's The One Show, Hailee Steinfeld was sawed in half in a performance of Clearly Impossible.
