= Richiardi Jr =

Peruvian magician (1923–1985)

Richiardi Jr. (often billed just as Richiardi, and sometimes as Aldo Richiardi), was the stage name of magician Aldo Izquierdo Colosi (24 November 1923 – 6 September 1985), who became famous for dramatic and gory stage presentations of classic stage illusions.

== Life and career ==
Aldo Izquierdo Colosi was born in Peru in 1923. His father Ricardo Richiardi (1895–1937) was a magician and ventriloquist, known as The Great Richardi. His grandfather, who also used the name Richiardi, had been a stage magician as well. He was Peruvian (although sometimes wrongly described as Brazilian or Argentinian). Although Aldo did not initially want to become a professional magician, he felt pressured to continue the family tradition; thus, in the 1940s, he adopted the name Richiardi Jr., and began a career in magic.

Richiardi Jr. was "a charismatic and electric performer who brought a sense of theatricality to everything he touched". He made his name with a series of stage shows featuring versions of established illusions such as sawing through a woman. What made his shows distinctive was that he used fake blood and other techniques to give the impression that he really was cutting or maiming his assistants. In 1949, Time magazine noted that these shock tactics had made his act one of the top earning stage shows in New York. Other illusions Richiardi Jr. performed include levitation and the razor blade trick (where he would appear to swallow and regurgitate razor blades).

He continued performing in New York City throughout his career, with shows such as The Incredible World Of Magic & Illusion, which ran at The Village Gate in New York in 1978. Richiardi performed the floating "kiddie car" a variation of a well known suspension effect on The Ed Sullivan Show which, years later, was used in Doug Henning's successful New York show Doug Henning & His World of Magic.

Richiardi made many television appearances, including 24 on The Ed Sullivan Show, the most appearances by any magician on that landmark series. In the 1970s he also starred in his own television show Chamber of Horrors, which was introduced by Vincent Price.

Richiardi Jr. injured his foot in 1985, and died due to complications that occurred after several surgeries.

On 8 June 2007, Criss Angel stated on The Late Late Show with Craig Ferguson that Richiardi was one of his greatest influences. David Copperfield wrote that Richiardi Jr. was "one of the finest magicians I have ever seen". Jamy Ian Swiss wrote that, "[w]ithout doubt, the greatest illusionist I’ve ever seen was Richiardi, Jr".
