= Impaled (illusion) =

Impaled is a classic stage illusion in which a performer appears to be impaled on or by a sword or pole. The name is most commonly associated with an illusion that was created by designer Ken Whitaker in the 1970s and which is sometimes also referred to as "Beyond Belief" or "Impaled Beyond Belief". This version has become part of the stage magic repertoire and has been performed by many of the world's most famous magic acts.

Australian-born magician Les Levante (1892-1978) is also credited with devising an impalement illusion but this was different from Whitaker's.

== Description of the Whitaker effect ==
Presentations of the effect vary but a typical one is as follows. The magician presents a stand, placed stage centre, which supports a sword in a vertical position with the sharpened tip pointing upwards. An assistant is introduced and the magician (sometimes with the help of additional assistants) picks her up and balances her in a supine position on the tip of the sword. The assistant holds her body rigidly horizontal and the small of her back rests on the tip of the sword. The magician then grasps the assistant's feet and rotates her on the sword tip. After spinning freely for a few turns the assistant sinks downwards, as if she has been impaled. As she drops her body goes limp so that she appears to hang lifelessly. The magician then appears to revive her with a kiss or with some magical gesture before lifting her from the sword and placing her back on her feet so that she can be seen to be unharmed.

== Illusionists known for performing the trick ==
David Copperfield performs the illusion on himself, as did Wayne Dobson and Simon Drake. The Pendragons' performance is particularly noted, and is presented as being a "balancing feat". After being impaled, Charlotte is revived by a kiss, in the manner of Sleeping Beauty. It is also noted for the brevity of her costume, which is apparently intended to suggest the impossibility of the illusion.

== Variations on Whitaker's basic illusion ==
There were several variations co-developed by Ken Whitaker & Craig Browning, which include;

- The Water Fount Penetration
- The Torch Penetration (exclusive to Joaquin Ayala)
- Giant Sewing Needle
- Neon Light Penetration

The Water Fount was built atop the original Whitaker fountain used in the Spellbinder rock-n-roll show where Impaled was first performed. Most of the adaptation to this version was done by Craig Browning, which included a rather lengthy routine composed on a "walking on water" and "suspension" prelude to the slow-motion penetration of a central cascading fountain through the torso... the performer being able to push his hand down through the cascade and out the back-side of the young lady and more. The fountain routine was created for the Browning show and due to unfortunate events, the main bowl of the fountain was destroyed and the effect never resurrected via Creative Illusion though Owens Magic seems to have produced a version; it is unknown if they are employing the same or similar methods of operation.

The Torch Penetration was made as an exclusive to Joaquin Ayala who introduced it at part of the SPELLBOUND show in Las Vegas. It is by far, the most dangerous version of the illusion because the girl working the prop can suffer some mild burns from time to time. The effect however, is an exclusive to the Ayala show, Joaquin holding all rights to the effect (other than the primary method of operation).

The Sewing Needle version was developed by Browning for a major production scheduled to go into an Myrtle Beach theme park, which never materialized. Much of the equipment built for this show going to auction. It is unknown who has the Needle but the over-all effect involved a major black-art animation sequence that was known only to Whitaker & Browning. The Needle itself, rested atop a large spool of thread.

The Neon Light Version(s)... there was at least three versions to how this effect operated that Ken Whitaker made prototypes for. It is unknown if the effect was ever sold or that any of the original "experiments" still exist.

Three Sword Presentation is one of the early variants to the effect popularized by the team of Bob Brown & Brenda. Basically, they would do the typical 3-sword version of the popular Sword Suspension, using the center sword in reprise for the Impalement finale. This prop was actually featured on an episode of MATLOCK -season 2 - episode 21)

The Scissor Impalement was built exclusively for Italian Illusionist Erix Logan by Bill Smith MagicVentures

Very few manufacturers have the legal right to make any of the versions noted here, with the exception of Owens Magic in Azusa, CA, Bill Smith, John Gaughan and Magic Craft, which is no longer in business.

== Method ==
One method for this illusion is given by Herbert L. Becker in his book All the Secrets of Magic Revealed. He suggests the assistant wears a special corset, which is hidden by her clothes. When the assistant is lifted onto the sword, the tip engages into the back of the corset. When the "impalement" occurs, the sword sinks into its support and a dummy sword tip emerges from the front of the corset. Everything is carefully timed and music is used to provide cues so that the performance is synchronised. The music also serves to cover any noise from the mechanism. This trick was exposed by the Masked Magician in Breaking the Magician's Code: Magic's Biggest Secrets Finally Revealed.

There are several different underlying methods for providing the driving force to operate the prop. As with many classic illusions there are numerous copies and imitations of the original props on the market. Well-engineered props are particularly important with this illusion for safety reasons. Because of the assistant's posture during the main part of the performance there is a risk of injury if the prop does not function correctly, a risk which can be substantial in the case of cheaply made props.
