= Thumper (magic trick) =

A thumper is a device used in a variety of magic tricks, typically with mentalism acts. It consists of small vibrating device that is triggered by a remote radio transmitter by a confederate in the audience. Practically any such device can be used, from custom equipment to everyday pagers.

In its most simple form, the confederate simply triggers the thumper at a given time. A classic strategy is to hide an object under a mug or cup, which the magician then "discovers" by slowly moving their hand over the cups and waiting for the thump. More complex forms can use codes.
