= Radium Girl =

Type of stage illusion

Magician Jeffrey Atkins and Paul Daniels performing The Radium Girl with an assistant called Jackie on The Paul Daniels Magic Show

The Radium Girl is a stage illusion of the classic type involving a female assistant in a large box and is probably best categorised as a penetration or restoration-type illusion. Its origins and history are much less well documented than those of many other "big box" illusions, but some sources indicate it might be one of the earliest examples of that type of trick. References and picture captions indicate it was the creation of British magician and designer Val Walker.

== Description ==
The magician recruits several volunteers from the audience. A female assistant is then introduced and one or more of the volunteers are invited to help her into a series of restraints, which consist of leather straps with short chains or cords attached. Four short straps are fitted as cuffs around her wrists and ankles, a slightly longer one as a collar around her neck and an even larger one as belt around her waist. As the first group of volunteers complete the fastening of the restraints to the assistant the magician presents a cabinet and invites the remaining volunteers to inspect it. The cabinet is just large enough to accommodate a person in a standing position and it is initially open at the front and back. A panel, with a series of slots and holes in, is presented and fitted to the back of the cabinet. The assistant, now fitted out with the straps and chains, steps into the cabinet. The chains are passed through holes in the side of the cabinet and secured to fixings on the outside. This leaves the assistant apparently held in a standing posture inside the cabinet, with her arms at her sides and with little leeway for movement. A second panel, similar to the first, is presented and fitted to the front of the cabinet. This second panel has a stylised silhouette of a female figure painted on it, which indicates the approximate position of the assistant who is now hidden inside. The magician then pushes a series of rods through holes in the front panel (these are shown to have emerged through matching holes in the rear panel). The first rods apparently serve to further prevent any movement by the assistant and later ones look as if they must actually be pushed through her body. In addition a series of blades are pushed through slots in the front panel so that it appears the cabinet is divided into sections, each of which is too small for the assistant. Finally, a large square-sectioned tube is pushed through the middle of the cabinet from front to back. It is demonstrated that it is possible to see through the tube and pass objects through it. The tube, the blades and the rods are then pulled out of the cabinet and the front panel is removed, revealing the assistant unharmed and still held in position by the restraints.

== History ==
References listed below attribute the creation of this illusion to British magician Val Walker. Tad Ware, writing in the magazine Magicol, has made a case that The Radium Girl was a source of inspiration to P.T. Selbit when he created an illusion called Sawing Through. Given that Selbit is widely credited with performing the first "sawing a woman in half" illusion in 1921 this would suggest that The Radium Girl pre-dates many other well-known "big box" type illusions. Some sources give 1919 as the date when Walker first presented The Radium Girl. Known performances in more recent times include a presentation by English magician Jeffery Atkins at the FISM congress in Paris in 1973. Atkins, together with host Paul Daniels and an assistant named Jackie, also performed the illusion on an episode of the BBC television series The Paul Daniels Magic Show (see picture). Another television magician, David Nixon, performed a version on one of his shows in the 1970s using singer Anita Harris as his assistant. He titled it the Thai Torture Trial but, other than the omission of some restraints, it was essentially the same as the Radium Girl.
