= Origami (magic trick) =

Origami is a magic stage illusion with a Japanese paperfolding theme, designed by Jim Steinmeyer. It was originally performed in 1986 by Canadian illusionist Doug Henning, using a working prop constructed by illusion builder John Gaughan. Illusionist David Copperfield later introduced presentational changes that would be widely copied by other performers.

== Effect ==
In 1986, the wonderful Doug Henning, my former boss, introduced the Origami illusion, which means that it's been twenty-five years since that debut.

Of course, at that time, I had no understanding how popular or how imitated this illusion would become. For the record, there are no "plans" for the illusion; I've always licensed it through specific associates and the illusion is protected by US patent. This hasn't prevented some magicians from building, selling and performing embarrassing and inferior versions of it. And it hasn't stopped magicians from performing it when they never really understood it. But I try to remind myself that imitation, even poor imitation, is the sincerest form of flattery.

— Jim Steinmeyer (2011)

=== Doug Henning version ===
Origami was first performed by Canadian magician Doug Henning in 1986. At that time, designer Jim Steinmeyer was employed as a magic consultant by Henning.

In the original presentation, Henning displays a small box, 12 inches square and decorated with Japanese-style prints, on top of a thin table. He explains that the box is held together by two ivory skewers and a wooden pole.

At this point, a male assistant appears on stage carrying a large mirror, which is mounted at the rear of the table and reflects the back of the box. Henning explains that the purpose of the mirror is to allow the audience to see the routine from the back. The ivory skewers and wooden pole are now removed from the box and placed against the mirror.

Henning tells the audience that the Origami Box is so named because it "unfolds, like an Origami work of art." He proceeds to unfold the box into a larger orange and black box. He further explains that the box holds just as much when it is folded down small as when it is opened up large. To demonstrate, a female assistant wearing a turquoise costume appears on stage and climbs into the box. Henning points out that she barely fits inside the larger box; and then proceeds to fold the box down into its original smaller size. As he does so, he recites a short poem:

"A little box, proved otherwise
The world at large, made small in size!"

The female assistant has disappeared from the table and it seems impossible that she can be inside the 12-inch box. Henning now takes the ivory skewers and wooden pole and inserts them back into the box, cross ways, length ways, and vertically. He now rotates the table, showing the back for the first time. There is no sign of the assistant.

Henning jokes that, the next time they travel, he will take his assistant as carry-on luggage. He now tells the audience that the Japanese believe that whatever can be folded can also be unfolded. As he does so, he begins to unfold the box, and recites the rest of the poem:

"And as they gazed, the wonder grew
The more they saw, the less they knew
Each fold and crease had not explained
All wonders of the world contained!"

The assistant emerges from the box, now dressed in a different outfit and wearing a mask.

=== David Copperfield version ===
David Copperfield introduced a number of presentational changes to Origami in 1989, devised by his choreographer, co-director and on-stage assistant Joanie Spina. The choreography, background music and presentational patter used in this version have all since been widely copied by other performers.

Copperfield displays a red box, around 12 inches square, on a thin table. It is penetrated by three Samurai swords - "side to side, front to back, and even from top to bottom." A male assistant mounts a mirror at the back of the table, and Copperfield explains that this enables the audience to "see the box from around the sides and from the back at all times."

Copperfield asks the audience to watch very carefully "because we're going to do this very slowly."

The lights are extinguished, leaving the stage in darkness. A musical soundtrack of Peter Gabriel's "Mercy Street" plays. The lighting is slowly restored to reveal Copperfield, in silhouette, holding one of the Samurai swords. Behind him, a female assistant clothed in red is seen, sitting on the stage floor. Copperfield removes each of the swords from the box with a flourish and mounts them on a nearby rack, before unfolding the box to its expanded state. The larger box is white.

Copperfield moves across to the female assistant, takes her hand and lifts her to her feet. The two embrace briefly, to the tempo of the music, and she then steps up onto the table. The two embrace again. The assistant then steps into the box, which Copperfield then folds back into a 12-inch cube. He takes each sword in turn, with a flourish, and stabs them through slits in the center of each face of the box; the first from front to back, the second from side to side, and then stands on the table to insert the third sword from top to bottom. He now rotates the table full circle to show all sides.

Then he removes the swords, unfolds the box once again to its full size, and the assistant steps out onto the table unharmed. She is now wearing a white costume, matching the expanded box. Copperfield lifts her from the table and they embrace one last time as the lights are dimmed.

=== Greg Frewin version ===
Illusionist Greg Frewin developed a version of Origami in which a black cloth is placed over the mirror; the mirror is then broken and three of the broken shards are used to penetrate the box. Finally, the mirror is restored.

== Construction ==
The original Origami prop was constructed by illusion builder John Gaughan. Current authorized versions are licensed to Gaughan and to Wellington Enterprises of New Jersey, United States.

The design of the prop was protected by US Patent USD345595S, issued in 1994 and expired in 2008.
