= Zig Zag Girl =

Stage illusion

The Zig-Zag Girl illusion is a stage illusion akin to the more famous sawing a woman in half illusion. In the Zig-Zag illusion, a magician divides an assistant into thirds, only to have them emerge from the illusion at the end of the performance completely unharmed.

It was invented in 1965 by magician Robert Harbin.

Harbin was frustrated by his illusions being pirated by other magicians, and this inspired him to publish the method in his book The Magic of Robert Harbin (1970). The book was limited to 500 copies, and owners of the book were granted permission to build or have built the Zig Zag Girl (or indeed any other of the items in the book). The rights to the book and the Zig Zag illusion were then in time passed to The Magic Circle in the wake of Harbin's death. The concept of dividing a lady assistant into two or three parts was something that Harbin experimented with throughout his career before creating his ultimate divide, the Zig Zag Girl. Evidence of his fascination with this concept of dividing an assistant can be found in his earlier publications; the closest relative to the Zig Zag is the "Little by Little" illusion, which was also explained in The Magic of Robert Harbin.

== The effect ==
The assistant (usually a woman) is placed in an upright cabinet, her face, hands, and left foot visible through openings in the front of the cabinet. Large metal blades are inserted horizontally in the cabinet's midsection, dividing it—and presumably the assistant inside—into thirds. The magician then slides the cabinet's midsection apart from the top and bottom thirds, giving the appearance that the assistant's midsection has been pulled away from the rest of her, giving her a "zig-zag" shape. While divided, a small door on the cabinet's midsection can be opened to examine—even touch—the assistant's body inside, a duty frequently performed by an audience member brought up on stage to help perform the illusion. At the completion of the illusion, the assistant's midsection is slid back into place, the two blades removed, and she steps out of the cabinet unscathed.

== Further developments ==
A number of magicians have begun performing variations on the basic illusion. In some, rather than the assistant's face being visible through a hole in the front of the cabinet, their entire head projects out of the cabinet through a hole in its upper surface. In another variation, rather than being divided into three pieces, the assistant is instead divided into five - This variation is commonly referred to as the "Five-Way Zig-Zag".

== Method ==
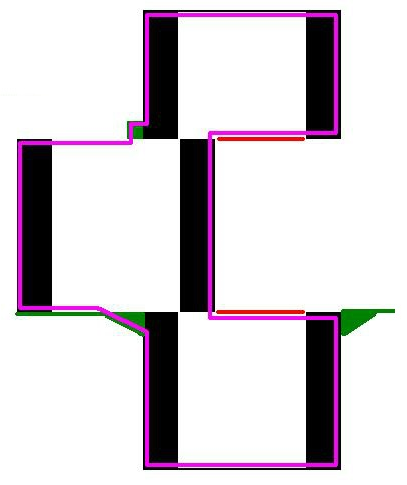
The design of the box creates a usable space (shown in pink) larger than the audience would expect. Black stripes down the front of the cabinet make this space appear narrower, and the blades (shown in red) do not extend all the way across. Apparent ornamentation on the box (shown in green) is hollow inside, providing the performer with more space.

The method of this trick was partially explained by Masked Magician Val Valentino as part of a Fox TV series called Breaking the Magician's Code: Magic's Biggest Secrets Finally Revealed. The trick hinges on two things: that people will not suspect the magician's assistant inside is key for the trick to work, and that the box is larger than it appears. Details are as follows:

1. Unlike more conventional magic tricks, this illusion relies on the skill of the magician's assistant inside, while the magician outside is a demonstrator. The success of the illusion rests on the assistant's ability to fit into the smallest possible space.
2. While the box does accommodate the woman, it is normally a very tight fit — the designer of the box endeavors to give the woman who will be inside enough room while simultaneously making it appear as small as possible from the point of view of the audience. For example, while the black strips down the sides make the compartments appear narrow, in reality, all that black space is usable by the magician's assistant inside.
3. The blades are inserted into the right side of the box. It appears as if the blades take up more space; when inserted, the handle fills up the width of the box on the outside, but the blade inside only slices a portion of the box.

== Cultural references ==
Films

- In the comedy film A Pleasure Doing Business (1979), actress Misty Rowe is shown inside of a trisected Zig Zag Girl box, although the trick itself is not depicted.

Literature

- In Elly Griffiths' mystery novel The Zig Zag Girl (2014), detective Edgar Stephens enlists the help of his former military buddy, master magician and former Magic Circle member Max Mephisto, to solve the murder of a young woman whose body was cut in thirds like a Zig Zag Girl's, the body parts placed in boxes akin to magicians' Zig Zag Girl prop boxes.
- The title character in Steve Martin's play The Zig-Zag Woman spends the majority of the play in a Zig Zag Girl box.

Television

- In the TV series Monk (Season 7, Episode 15: "Mr Monk and the Magician"), a Zig Zag cabinet is used with Adrian Monk inside the cabinet.
- In the episode "Our Very First Telethon" of Full House, Joey performs this trick with Rebecca standing in as his assistant.
- In season 4, episode 10 of the animated sitcom Bob's Burgers, Tina is left in the Zig Zag box after she volunteers for the role of assistant with her uninterested crush.
- In Season 5, episode 4 of Inside No 9, "Misdirection", the lead character's wife is seen inside a Zig Zag Girl cabinet, rehearsing for a show.

== See also ==
- Clearly Impossible, variant on the trick
- Hemicorporectomy, when a person is actually cut in half
