= Devil's torture chamber =

Magic trick

A performance of The Devil's Torture Chamber by magician Guy Kent on a British TV show from the 1970s

The Devil's Torture Chamber is a magic stage illusion of the classic type involving a female magician's assistant in a large box and is probably best categorised as a penetration or restoration-type illusion.

== Description ==
The magician presents an upright cabinet that is just big enough to hold a person with a little space above their head. The magician then presents a rack of metal spikes. Spectators are offered the chance to tap the spikes with a metal implement to prove they are real and solid. The spikes are fitted into the top of the cabinet pointing downwards. An assistant is introduced and steps into the cabinet. The door is closed and the spikes are forced downwards using handles that protrude through slots in the side of the cabinet. The implication is that the assistant must have been impaled by the spikes. However the door is opened to reveal the assistant alive and unharmed.

There are several slight variations. Sometimes the assistant carries a string of inflated balloons when he or she steps into the cabinet. These are burst as the spikes descend to give an added audible dimension to the illusion. Another description has a small door opened to show the assistant alive when the spikes are at the bottom of the cabinet; the small door is then closed again and the spikes lifted to the top before the assistant is finally fully revealed.

French magician Don José de Murcia performs a version of this illusion under the title "La Herse Infernal".

== History ==
The illusion is thought to be the creation of Floyd Thayer, founder of the Thayer Magic Company. Blueprints for it appeared in the Thayer catalog #7 supplement, which dates it to the early 1930s.
