= Wringer (magic trick) =

The Wringer (also known as the "wringer box illusion" or "mangle box") is a stage magic trick. The magician places an assistant (or a shill from the audience) into a large box with a set of rollers at the front. The magician turns a crank, and the assistant emerges through the rollers, now appearing flat as a pancake. The magician then opens the front of the box, revealing it to be empty. Although not always necessary, the magician may later restore the assistant to their original form. This trick can also be performed with small animals, such as ducks or rabbits.
