= Chinese linking rings =

Magic trick

Christian Farla performs Linking Rings routine

The Chinese linking rings is a classic of illusion magic in which solid metal rings appear to link and unlink, pass through each other, and form chains and other complex patterns and configurations. The rings may even be handed out to audience members for examination. Sometimes an audience member is invited onto the stage to perform alongside the magician as part of a "do as I do" routine.

== History ==
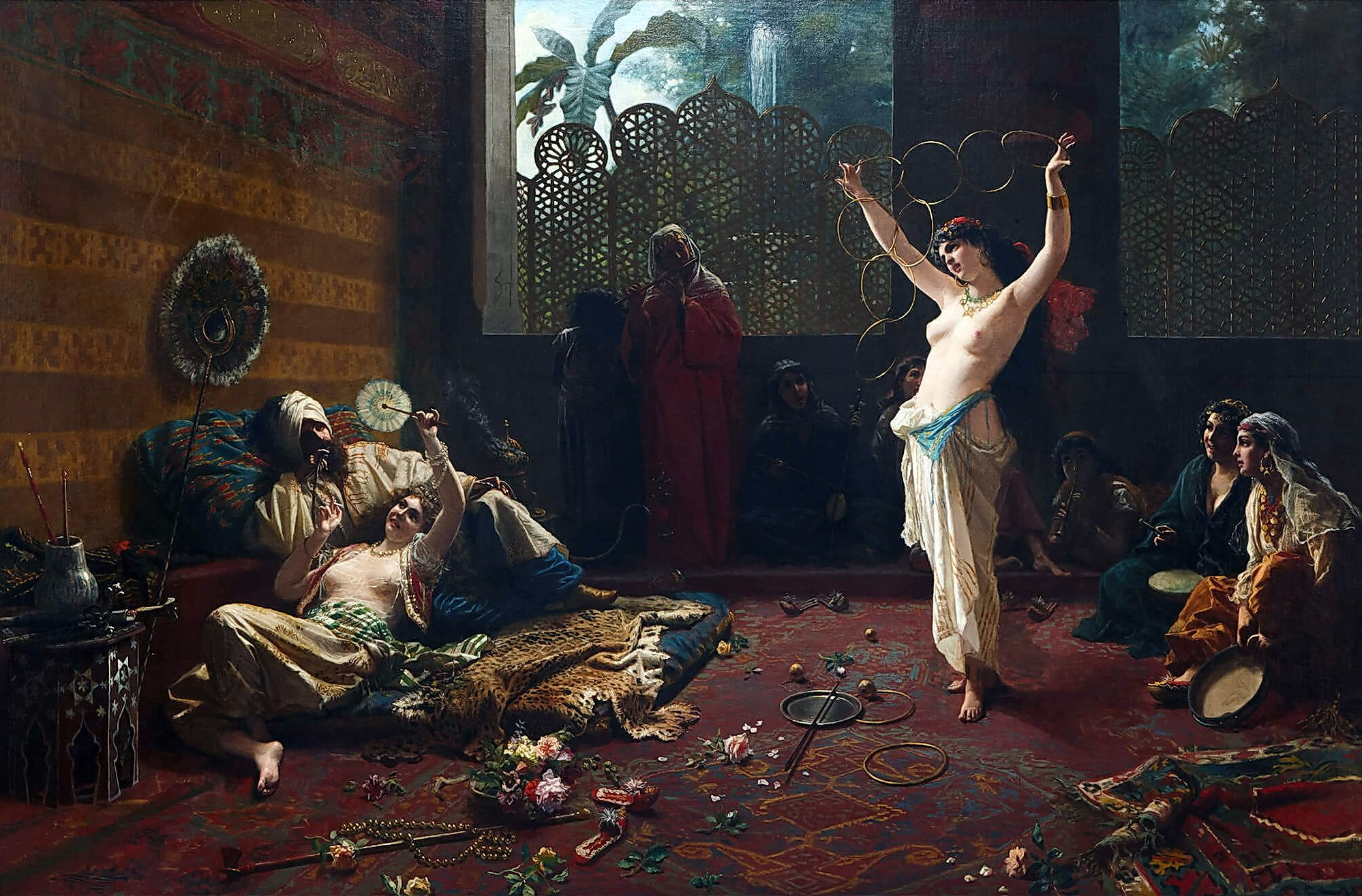
Une soirée oisive au sérail, Giacomo Mantegazza, 1876

Chinese stage magician Ching Ling Foo (1854–1922) was one of the early performers of the linking rings in the form known today. A painting by Giacomo Mantegazza in 1876 showed a harem girl holding a set of rings above her head. Speculation about the rings' origin has been traced to Turkey, Egypt and the Middle East and as long ago as the 1st century.

French magician Philippe (Jacques Andre Noel Talon) was one of the first magicians reported to use the rings. During the second half of his show, he donned an Oriental robe and conical cap. He took 8-inch (200 mm) solid metal rings and had the audience examine them. He claimed that he learned them from a troupe of Chinese jugglers in Britain. After the rings were returned, Philippe proceeded to link and unlink them. From there, he combined glittering circles into complicated designs. According to Robert-Houdin, he said that for a finale, Philippe blew on them and they fell separately on the floor. Robert-Houdin also performed a version of the trick, as did the magician Chung Ling Soo.

In the May 2016 issue of Genii (magazine), world-famous mentalist magic historian Max Maven penned a seminal article about a rare Japanese book called Hokasen that featured a routine called “The Iron Rings”. As this text was published in 1764, it is widely believed to be the earliest known written explanation of the linking rings. Maven also goes on to explain why the Japanese dubbed the rings as “Chinese”.

Recent magicians who are known for their performances with the linking rings include Dai Vernon, Richard Ross, Jack Miller, Michael Skinner, Ian Ray - "The Genie Ali Pali", Jeff McBride, Paul W Draper, Shoot Ogawa, Fu Manchu, Tina Lenert, Fábio De'Rose, Jim Cellini, Chris Capeheart, Tom Frank, Galina, Whit Haydn, Paul Daniels, and Jay Marshall. Christian Bale's character, Alfred Borden, performs the trick in The Prestige. The number of rings used can vary from two to ten, or more. A standard set of commercially available rings typically includes eight rings.

In 1988, Japanese magician Masahiro Yanagida performed with miniature Ninja rings, using four rings that were four and a half inches (or 11.43 cm) in diameter. Since then, the Chinese linking rings have also become a favourite performance item for close-up magicians.

== Rings ==
A quality set of eight linking rings can be obtained from a supplier of magic props. Most consider 8-inch-diameter (200 mm) rings to be the smallest size suited for stage performance, while 12-inch (300 mm) rings are common; 15-inch (380 mm) rings are also available, but rarely seen in use. Larger sizes are often constructed from stainless steel tubing for the best combination of durability and weight. Professionals may wish to have a set of larger-diameter rings for use on a stage, or a "close-up" set of rings in the 4–5-inch (10–13 cm) range.

Many magicians look for rings that make a nice ringing tone when they strike each other.

== See also ==
- List of magic tricks

== Other sources ==
- Whit Haydn, Comedy Four-Ring Routine, DVD
- Harlan Tarbell, Tarbell Course in magic.
