= Sawing a woman in half =

Stage magic trick

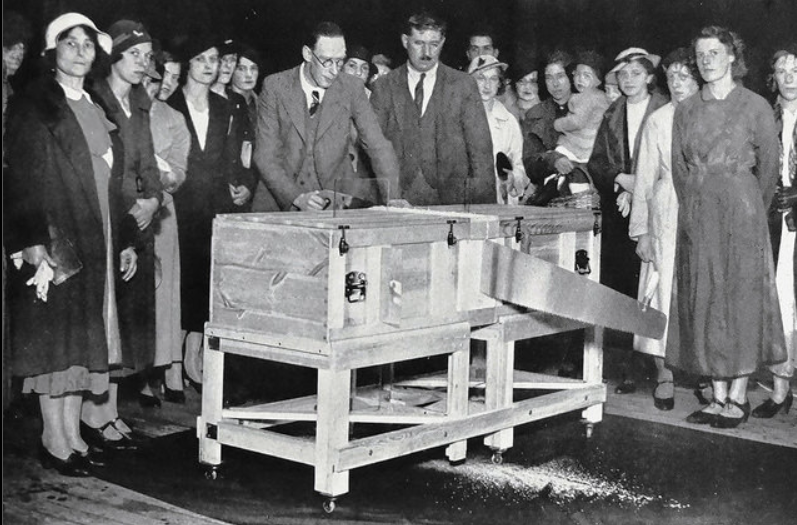
Magician P. T. Selbit performing a version of the trick in 1937

Sawing a woman in half is a generic name for a number of stage magic tricks in which a person (traditionally a female assistant) is apparently cut or divided into two (or more) pieces.

== History ==
There remains a debate about the origin of sawing illusions, with some sources saying a magician named Torrini may have performed the first version in front of Pope Pius VII in 1809. However, it is more likely that the story is fiction which has its roots in the writings of the famous French magician Jean-Eugène Robert-Houdin. In his Memoirs, written in 1858, Robert-Houdin described a sawing illusion performed by a magician named Torrini.

Modern magic inventor and historian Jim Steinmeyer has concluded that there was probably no real Torrini and the story was merely a way for Robert-Houdin to play with ideas. It was suggested during a court case in 1922 that the trick can be traced back to ancient Egypt; however, this claim has not been substantiated. Wherever the idea originated, until the 1920s it remained just an idea for an effect, rather than a practical application of a method.

A public show ‘Phauna - Grand Conjuring Performance’ at the Warminster Athenaeum in Warminster, Wiltshire, 11 and 12 January 1887, included the illusion by Mr F I Flower of sawing his magician’s assistant, Miss Sylvester in half. This could claim to be the earliest verifiable record of this act.

Until recently it was generally accepted that the first public performance of a sawing illusion was achieved by British magician P. T. Selbit on 17 January 1921 at the Finsbury Park Empire theatre in London. In fact Selbit had previously performed the illusion in December 1920 before a select audience of promoters and theatrical agents at the St. George's Hall, London, to try to persuade one of them to book his new act for public shows. His trick, which he billed as "Sawing Through A Woman", was significantly different from what a modern audience would expect. Selbit's assistant was locked inside a closed wooden crate and could not be seen. The impression that she could not evade the saw was created by the confined space in the box and by ropes tied to her hands, feet, and neck, which were held throughout the illusion by spectators from the audience.

The question of who was the first woman to be sawn in half has received much less publicity than the question of which magician first presented the illusion. According to Jim Steinmeyer the woman who participated in the December 1920 demonstration was Jan Glenrose, who was Selbit's main assistant at that time and who was also the partner of magician Fred Culpitt. In the public performance the role of victim was taken by principal assistant Betty Barker.

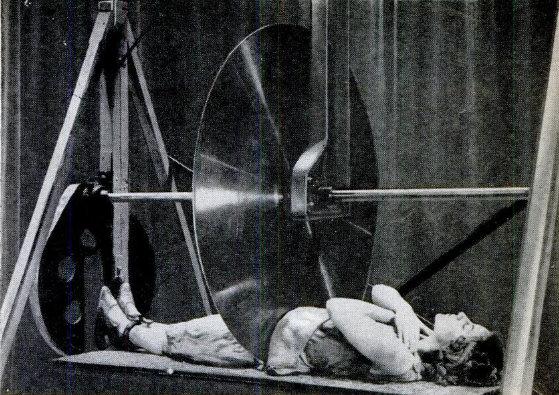
A later iteration of Horace Goldin's version of the trick, with a buzzsaw blade

Later in 1921, Horace Goldin, a magician working in the United States, presented the first version which might look familiar to modern audiences. Goldin's assistant lay in a box from which her feet, head and hands protruded. Goldin sawed through the middle of the box, inserting metal sheets to cover the cut ends, and then pushed the two halves a little way apart. This process was then reversed, and the assistant released unharmed. Goldin later developed a sawing illusion that dispensed with boxes and used a large buzzsaw. The success of Selbit and then Goldin led to more and more magicians trying to imitate them with copies or improved versions of sawing illusions. By November 1921 the Thayer magic company in America was advertising a version for sale. A complete prop from Thayer would cost $175 or they would sell plans for $5.

== Effects and variations ==
There are many sawing tricks with significant differences in their basic effect. In some, the illusion is merely of a blade passing through an assistant's body, while in others it appears that the assistant is severed into two pieces that are moved apart. Some so-called "sawing" illusions do not actually involve a saw but instead use plain blades or blunt dividing panels.

One major group of tricks involves an assistant in a box, which conceals her body from view while any cutting takes place. This group includes the "Selbit", "Wakeling" and "Thin Model" tricks as well as several versions associated with Horace Goldin. In some versions, the box completely covers the assistant while in others the assistant's head, hands and feet remain in view during the trick.

=== The Selbit sawing ===
Several volunteers are recruited from the audience. One or more of these people are invited to tie ropes around the assistant's wrists, ankles and neck. The assistant then steps into a wooden crate or box, which is similar in proportion to but slightly larger than a coffin. The ropes are threaded through holes in the box and the ends are given to volunteers, who are instructed to pull them tight and keep hold of them (the neck rope has an added knot to prevent the assistant being strangled). The assistant is thus secured in a standing spreadeagle position in the box. The box is then closed and lifted into a horizontal position on a set of trestles. The magician then slides glass plates through the crate (and apparently through his assistant).

The magician then saws right through the centre of the box, dividing it into two. The sections are pulled slightly apart and the assistant's torso is visible. The impression is that the saw blade must have passed through the assistant's midriff. The assistant is then released from the box and is revealed to be unharmed. This was the illusion performed at the Finsbury Park Empire theatre in London on 17 January 1921.

=== Goldin's box sawings ===
Goldin presented several sawing illusions that involved a box. To audiences they all appeared largely similar but they involved differing methods, which were steadily improved as time went on and as earlier methods were exposed. His first performance was at the Society of American Magicians annual banquet at the McAlpin Hotel, New York, on 3 June 1921. On that occasion the trick was not well received. The box he used was large and not very deceptive and instead of an attractive woman he employed a bellboy as an assistant. The impression given was that he was clumsily and hurriedly trying to cash in on Selbit's success in Britain. However, fellow magician Howard Thurston, who was in the audience, realised the potential of the trick and persuaded Goldin to let him help in its development.

Thurston employed an established magician and prop builder named Harry Jansen to perfect the illusion. Jansen's improved version of the apparatus featured a smaller box from which the victim's head and feet would protrude during the sawing. Goldin, Thurston and various other magicians employed by Goldin toured the United States performing this trick with great success at theatres belonging to the Keith-Orpheum group. Goldin had great promotional acumen and was fond of resorting to legal action to block anyone else, including Selbit, from competing with him in the USA. As a result, Goldin was sometimes wrongly credited as the originator of the sawing illusion.

The basic form of Goldin's box sawings was as follows. The magician presents a box which is similar in size and proportion to that used in the Selbit sawing but which is already in a horizontal position. An assistant climbs into the box and lies down. In the process her head and hands are seen to emerge from holes in one end of the box and her feet from the other. The box is closed and then sawn through across the middle. Dividers are placed into the box either side of the cut and it is then pulled apart so the sections can be seen clearly separated. The assistant's head and hands are seen sticking out of one section and her feet out of the other. The box is then pushed together again and opened and the assistant emerges unharmed.

=== Wakeling ===
The magician presents a rectangular table just big enough to accommodate a person lying upon it. An assistant is introduced and several assistants are recruited from the audience. The magician presents a set of restraints consisting of a sturdy collar and a pair of ankle straps, each attached to a length of chain or rope. The assistant sits on the table with her legs stretched out and volunteers are invited to fasten the restraints around her neck and ankles.

The ropes or chains are threaded through holes in the table and the ends given to volunteers, who are instructed to pull them tight and hold them that way throughout the illusion. The assistant is thus pulled down onto her back and secured in that position. Two halves of a large box are presented and fixed in place over the assistant, covering her completely. Side panels are opened to show the assistant is still in place lying flat on her back. The assistant is then divided into two. Sometimes the division is accomplished merely by pushing two metal dividing panels into slots near where the two halves meet.

Sometimes the cutting of the assistant is emphasised by sawing between the two halves of the box before sliding the dividers into place. Catches are released to allow the table to be separated into two halves along with the box. The halves are parted and the assistant thus appears to have been cut into two completely disconnected pieces. The box and table are then pushed together, the restraints are released and the box is opened to allow the assistant to emerge unharmed.

This version of the trick is generally associated with magician and inventor Alan Wakeling. Whilst Wakeling performed this illusion and perfected aspects of it, the general configuration and method have been attributed to an earlier magician, Virgil Harris Mulkey (1900–1989), aka. "The Great Virgil", who first performed it in 1942 and later passed on the idea to Wakeling.

=== The thin model ===
The thin model sawing is one of the most common variants performed by contemporary magicians. The basic arrangement and sequence of events is similar to that described for the Goldin box sawings (see above). However, the box appears very shallow in comparison to Goldin's, which was large by modern standards. The ends of the box are initially open when the assistant climbs in. Once the assistant is lying down she is secured in place by having stocks placed over her neck and ankles. The stocks form the ends of the box. The shallow box adds to the impression that the assistant could not possibly find room to evade the saw blade even if she could release herself from the stocks and try to curl up in one half of the box.

=== Transparent boxes ===
Magician Les Arnold is reported to have been the first to have devised a clear box sawing (known as the "Crystal Sawing") as far back as 1976. The Pendragons performed a variation called "Clearly Impossible", in which the box used is both particularly slim and also transparent. The concept of "Clearly Impossible" has been credited to Jonathan Pendragon and the major distinguishing feature of The Pendragons' illusion from the Les Arnold concept is that the transparent boxes are seemingly never covered.

=== Double sawing ===
The "double sawing illusion" is a way of adding an extra effect to box-type sawings. It is generally associated with the "thin-model" sawing apparatus. The magician saws two people in half using two sets of apparatus. The people are usually chosen or dressed so as to be clearly distinguishable. For example, they might be in different colored costumes, of different skin colors, or of different genders. After the box halves are separated they are jumbled up and then re-assembled so that the bottom half of one box is matched to the top of the other and vice versa. When the victims emerge, each appears to have been given the other's lower half.

The creation of this version has been credited to magician Alan Wakeling, who devised it for fellow magician Channing Pollock to perform.

=== Jigsaw ===
This version of the illusion is usually performed using a volunteer from the audience as the assistant being sawn in half, and can be performed without any prior rehearsal with the audience volunteer. The audience volunteer lies down on a table. A frame is placed over her middle. The magician then presents an electric jigsaw and proceeds to align the blade into a slot in the frame. The magician switches on the saw and apparently uses it to slice through the audience volunteer's waist, which remains obscured by the frame. The saw emerges from the opposite side of the frame. Once the sawing is finished the frame is removed and the audience volunteer is revealed to be in one piece.

=== Bow saw ===
This variant begins in a similar way to the jig sawing and is also usually performed using an audience volunteer as the assistant, again without any prior rehearsal. With the assistant lying on a table, the magician fixes a frame over her midriff. The magician then presents a bow saw and proceeds to saw through the volunteer assistant, with the blade guided within the frame. Once the blade has apparently passed all the way through the volunteer assistant the frame is released and removed. It is then revealed that the volunteer assistant is encircled by the handle and blade of the bow saw.

=== Buzzsaw ===
A large apparatus is presented, consisting of a sturdy frame supporting a large buzzsaw or circular saw and a table sufficiently large to carry a person lying flat. It is shown that the table travels beneath the saw, leaving little or no gap, so that anything placed upon it in the path of the saw would be sliced through. The table is moved either by an electric mechanism or by some form of manual crank. The buzzsaw is generally driven by an electric motor. To demonstrate the saw is completely genuine, a piece of wood is placed on the table and sliced in two in full view. An assistant is introduced and placed in a horizontal position on the table.

Sometimes the magician might give the impression of hypnotizing the assistant into a rigid trance before having her lifted onto the table. She is secured in place with two metal "straps" that close over her waist and which align close to the plane of the saw. She might also be further secured with straps or manacles at her wrists and ankles. A strip of wood is pushed beneath her waist in line with the saw. The saw is then started and the table set in motion. The saw visibly passes through the assistant and generally sounds like it is sawing through something.

Once the table reaches the end of its travel and the saw is switched off the assistant is released and shown to be in one piece and uninjured. The strip of wood that had been placed beneath her is shown to have been sawn into two strips, thus reinforcing that the saw really did cut in the manner it appeared to. Harry Blackstone, Sr. was performing this effect in the United States in the 1930s.

=== Death Saw ===
The Death Saw is presented as an escape gone wrong. Its best known performer is David Copperfield. The performer is secured to a table beneath a large buzzsaw or blade, which is set to descend upon them under the control of a timing mechanism. After being secured with various manacles the performer is enclosed in a box. The saw is then set going.

After a while the sides of the box fall away to reveal the performer struggling to escape the manacles. Finally the saw drops before the performer has time to escape. The blade slices right through the performer's body. The two halves of the table are rolled apart so that the performer is clearly separated into two sections. The performer then appears to command the whole process to reverse: The body halves go back together, the saw rises, the box closes. Finally the performer emerges unharmed from the box.

=== Modern Art ===
Although not generally classified as a "sawing" illusion, Modern Art is sometimes billed as an "upright dividing the lady in two". The prop is a vertical cabinet which stands alongside a table-like structure that is half its height. The assistant enters the cabinet through a door in the side away from the table structure. The assistant's face can be seen peering from an opening at the top of the cabinet and a panel at the bottom of the front of the cabinet is opened to show the assistant's legs. A sword or blade is then placed into a slot at the point where the top of the half-height table meets the cabinet. The top of the cabinet then slides across onto the table, giving the impression that the top half of the assistant has been moved sideways and in the process been severed from the legs by the blade. Panels in the front of the cabinet are opened to show the top and bottom halves of the assistant apparently separate. The top of the cabinet is then slid back into its original position and the assistant emerges unharmed. The effect and method are credited to designer Jim Steinmeyer.

=== Criss Angel's pulling a woman apart ===
Criss Angel performed a trick in which he appeared to pull a woman in half with his hands during an outdoor performance and half of her crawled away. The trick involved a woman with sacral agenesis and a contortionist. Magician and historian Ricky Jay has written that a version of this trick was previously performed by another magician. The magician that inspired Criss Angel's trick was Rajah Raboid, who performed this trick with Johnny Eck and his twin brother, Robert, in 1937.

== Methods and exposure ==
Variant 1 from Goldin's patent.

Variant 2 from Goldin's patent.

As suggested by the various effects, detailed above, there are numerous methods for accomplishing sawing illusions. Over the years a number of these have been exposed and several have been published and are easily obtainable.

Publishing of magic methods has proved a controversial subject at times. It has involved battles between those determined to expose methods and magicians, who have sometimes resorted to legal action to try to preserve secrecy. The sawing illusion has had a prominent role in the history of such battles and has thus contributed to case law.

In September 1921, motivated by concerns about preventing competition from other magicians who might copy him, Horace Goldin forwent secrecy and applied for a patent for Sawing a woman in half. He was awarded U.S. patent number 1,458,575 on 12 June 1923. The following is an outline summary the patent:

One variant presents the front of the box to the audience (A). Expecting the box is the size of an ordinary chest, they may assume that the "victim" is arranged (B), crossing the path of the saw. In reality, the box may be deeper (which the audience cannot see from their perspective), and the "victim" curled up to clear the blade (C).

Another variant has a false table on which the box rests. This allows the carved out table to be used as a place for the woman to crawl up in and avoid the saw. Her feet are replaced with fakes that are moved with electric motors. These motors have the ability to move the feet, but only slightly, as no technology exists to make realistic-looking feet of flesh or the ability to move the toes of the feet; this means that all fake feet must be wearing shoes or socks during the performance. This method is generally not in use today, as the false table must be extremely thick to conceal the assistant.

Penn & Teller use the second variant of this trick on a regular basis in Las Vegas. They have also performed this trick on television at least twice: on Home Improvement and during the 2007 NBA All-Star Weekend. They always reveal how the trick is done.

== Famous performances and depictions ==
A number of performances or depictions of sawing illusions have achieved particular fame or notoriety.

- P. T. Selbit's original performances in London in January 1921 were special because the effect was new and shocking to audiences of the time. Such was the impact of Selbit's creation that, for decades afterwards, other magicians would try to emulate and improve on what he had done, thus affecting the course of stage magic history.
- In 1956, Indian illusionist P. C. Sorcar used a buzzsaw to cut his wife in two during a televised performance. Just when he had divided her the host quickly signed off and the show ended. This caused horrified viewers to believe she had accidentally been killed. In reality, it was a live television broadcast and time had run out.
- In the 1957 Friz Freleng cartoon Show Biz Bugs, Bugs Bunny asks for a volunteer for this trick, and Daffy Duck happily obliges, throughout attempting to expose the fraud of this trick. After the trick is over, Daffy tries to show the audience he isn't cut in half, only for his upper and lower halves to jump whenever he is angry (his response: "Hmmph. It's a good thing I got Blue Cross").
- Live performances by Peruvian magician Richiardi Jr are often cited as the most horrific presentations of a sawing illusion. Richiardi used a buzzsaw prop similar to that employed by Sorcar, but he greatly added to the shock value by incorporating fake blood and entrails, which were sprayed over the stage (and sometimes beyond it) as the saw went to work.
- The 1962 Alfred Hitchcock Presents episode "The Sorcerer's Apprentice" depicted sawing a woman in half. The NBC Television Network and sponsor Revlon determined the episode was too gory and chose not to air it.
- In the late 1990s, stage performances by David Copperfield often featured presentations of various versions of sawing a woman in half, including "Clearly Impossible", a buzzsaw that had originally belonged to Orson Welles, and Copperfield's own "Blade" length-ways sawing. Very often, these presentations featured Copperfield's fiancée, supermodel Claudia Schiffer, as the woman being sawn in half.

== Critical responses and twists ==
Jim Steinmeyer has argued that Selbit's introduction of the sawing illusion was a turning point in the history of magic after which gentler styles represented by the likes of John Nevil Maskelyne were in irreversible decline to be replaced by more sensational presentations that owed something to the shock effect of Grand Guignol theatre. In particular, Steinmeyer identifies the sawing illusion as the beginning of a fashion for magic featuring female assistants in the role of victim. He says the cliche of "pretty ladies teased and tortured by magicians" was not a cliche prior to Selbit's illusion.

Male assistants were common in magic history and in the Victorian era; the cumbersome clothes imposed on women by the fashions of the time made it impractical for them to squeeze into confined spaces required by some tricks. Changing fashions in the early 20th century made Selbit's choice of a female victim a practical proposition. It was also true that an illusion designed for a lithe woman might be more compact and deceptive than one tailored to fit a man. However, more controversially, a combination of the emancipation of women and a population desensitized by war and exposed to new entertainment phenomena meant Selbit's choice struck a chord in the public imagination. In Steinmeyer's words: "beyond the practical concerns, the image of the woman in peril became a specific fashion in entertainment".

Modern magicians, including female performers, have responded by placing a male performer in the role originally filled by a woman. Magician Dorothy Dietrich, who established herself as a leading magician as a teenager, has been called the "first woman to saw a man in half."

The centenary of the trick of sawing a woman in half was celebrated in January 2021.

== See also ==
- Clearly Impossible, a variant on the trick
- Zig Zag Girl, another variant
- Mismade Girl, another variant
