= Needle-through-arm =

Magic illusion

Needle-through-arm is a magic illusion that was created by Bruce Spangler and later popularized by comedy actor/magician Harry Anderson. The trick can be performed as part of either a stage magic or a parlor magic routine. As the name would suggest, needle-through-arm relies on shock value to have a comedic effect.

Although the trick popularized by Anderson is an illusion, other magicians, such as David Blaine, have apparently performed the trick by actually sticking the needle through a fistula surgically created in the performer's arm.

== History ==
The effect was originally invented by Bruce Spangler, who debuted the trick at the premier of the 1960 movie Macumba Love and later sold it under the name "You-Do Voodoo". Harry Anderson popularized the trick in the 1980s, performing it on television on Saturday Night Live in 1982 and selling his own version of the trick.

== Presentation ==
In presentation, the magician produces a hat pin, roughly ten inches long, and demonstrates that it is sharp by using it to pop a balloon. He then proceeds to sterilize the underside of his forearm with alcohol and, holding his arm so that it is not facing the audience, insert the needle through the skin of his arm. From the audience's perspective, this is not very impressive until the magician lowers his arm for the audience to see. The needle appears to pass about two inches under the skin. The new wound then appears to bleed, with the blood dripping down the magician's arm. The needle can be slid back and forth through the wound. After the needle is removed, the magician cleans his arm which can be offered for inspection.

== Method ==
The needle-through-arm effect uses a gimmicked needle and stage blood as well as a small quantity of adhesive, such as rubber cement or spirit gum. The bead at the end of the hat pin is hollow and made of rubber so that it can hold a small amount of stage blood. The needle is hollow and has a small hole in its side through which the "blood" can flow.

When the magician appears to sterilize their arm, they actually coat their arm with a thin film of adhesive. When the magician is supposedly inserting the needle through the arm, they actually fold up two sides of skin over the needle that will stick to each other, forming a channel of skin that the needle can pass under. The stage blood flowing out of the needle lubricates the "wound" so that it can be slid back and forth.
