= Metamorphosis (illusion) =

Stage illusion

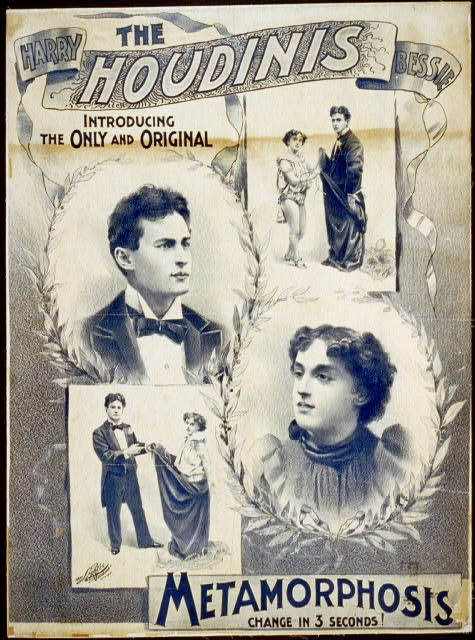
A poster for the Houdinis' show

Metamorphosis is the name of a stage illusion in which the magician and their assistant exchange places. The illusion was invented by John Nevil Maskelyne, but most often associated with famous escape artist Harry Houdini and performed to some renown (for speed) by The Pendragons, among others. It is also known amongst magicians as the Substitution Trunk (often abbreviated to "Sub Trunk").

== Illusion ==
In the illusion, an assistant (Houdini employed his wife Bess) is locked inside a large box or trunk, often after being restrained with handcuffs, ropes, bags, etc. The magician stands on the trunk and holds a curtain up to momentarily conceal his entire body. When the curtain is lowered, it is now revealed to be the assistant standing atop the box, the magician and assistant having changed places instantaneously. When the box is opened, it is shown to contain the magician, restrained as the assistant had been. In some acts, the magician is locked in the box first, then appears standing atop the box.

== Performances ==
Illusionist Criss Angel assisted by Klayton and his other assistants has also performed the Metamorphosis trick as part of his "Amystika" show. In Angel's version, he was handcuffed, and put into the box with assistant standing on top of it. After the flashes and torches lit the stage, they swapped places.

Variations include the Aquarian Illusion created in the 1970s by Alan Wakeling for Mark Wilson, who performed it in The Magic Circus series and a HBO special Mumbo Jumbo! It's Magic, and in closing his Las Vegas shows. In this version an acrylic tank filled with water is used and a beautiful swimsuit-clad woman assistant is locked inside underwater. Penn and Teller performed the illusion in an underwater theatre with a female assistant (a Weeki Wachee "mermaid") handcuffed and locked in a steel cage on the sea bottom. These variations add a significant element of peril. During the performance the assistant is trapped underwater with no air supply, and if something were to go wrong she would possibly drown.

Suspended Animation (or modern day metamorphosis), is where a trunk is suspended high on a platform above the stage, creating an aerial exchange. This evolution of the illusion was invented by Australian illusionist John Taylor. Besides the unique aerial exchange, what makes Suspended Animation so unexpected and unique is John Taylor's original exchange cloth technique used in the illusion. Many of today's leading illusionists around the world buy the rights off of John Taylor to be able to perform his original invention Suspended Animation.

A method for Metamorphosis was exposed by the Masked Magician, Val Valentino, as part of Fox TV series Breaking the Magicians' Code: Magic's Biggest Secrets Finally Revealed. He was assisted by Michelle Berube.
