= Magician's assistant =

Performer in a magic act who is not billed as the magician

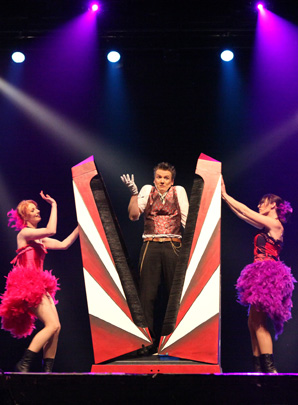
A stage magician performing with the aid of two assistants

A magician's assistant is a performer in a magic act who is not billed as the magician or principal name in the act.

== Description ==
The role of an assistant can include holding the props that are used by a magician, shifting props onto and off the stage, and serving as a living prop in illusions that involve manipulation of the human body. Other aspects of the role can include dancing or acting as visual ornamentation, sometimes for simple aesthetic purposes and sometimes to misdirect audience attention. The figure of the glamorous female assistant has become a stereotype or icon in art, popular media and fiction.

Although magicians' assistants appear to play a supporting role and receive a lesser billing than the magician who appears to be the source of illusions, the assistant is often the one making the mechanics of the illusions work. In the words of Joanie Spina, who worked for 11 years as principal assistant, choreographer and artistic consultant to illusionist David Copperfield, "I did find fault with the term 'assistant' because it sounds like someone rolling props on and off stage when many of us were highly trained actors and dancers."

== History and critiques ==
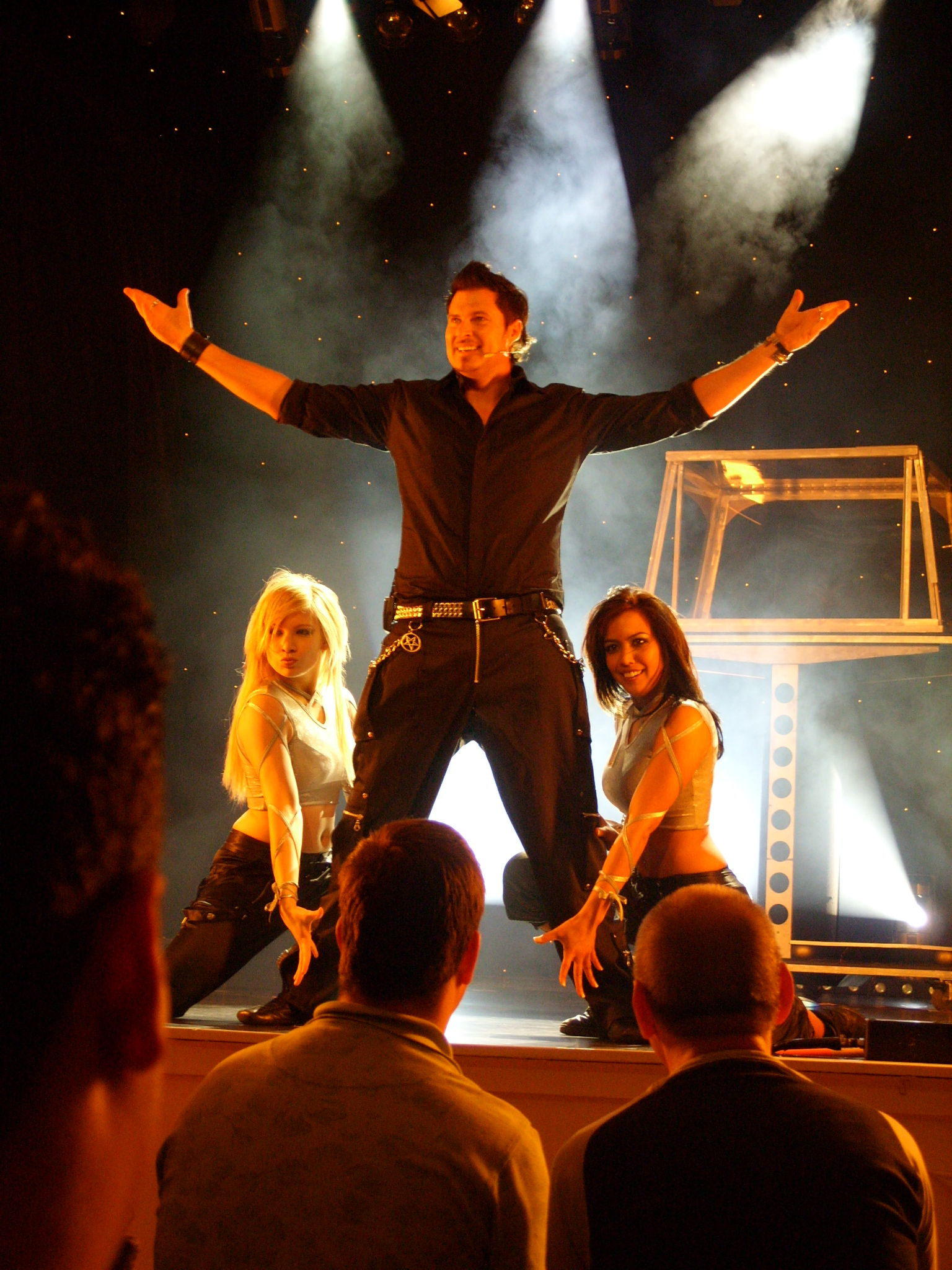
Sabrina and Vanessa with illusionist Christian Farla

Assistants have been part of magic shows for most of the recorded history of magic as a performance art. Despite their often crucial role in magic acts they, and the work they do, have suffered from negative public perceptions. The assistant's role has often been stereotyped as consisting of menial tasks and having the primary purpose of adding a visually aesthetic element to an act. This is associated with the perception that assistants are usually female and often dressed in revealing costumes. Although there have been plenty of instances of male assistants throughout the history of magic, the glamorous female stereotype has made a particular impact because female assistants were a prominent feature of illusion shows during the 20th century, when magic began to reach huge new audiences, first through the burgeoning of live vaudeville and variety shows and then through television. The glamorous female assistant has become an iconic image that continues in modern media and literature.

A notable feature of the glamorous female assistant iconography is the frequency with which assistants play the role of "victim" in illusions where they are tied up, apparently cut with blades, penetrated with spikes or swords or otherwise tortured or imperilled. Examples include Aztec Lady, Devil's Torture Chamber, Mismade Girl, Radium Girl, Zig Zag Girl, and, perhaps most famous of all, Sawing a woman in half. Noted illusion designer and historian Jim Steinmeyer has identified the advent of the sawing illusion as a turning point in magic history and a moment which, more than any other, marks the origin of the cliche of the female assistant as victim. It is generally agreed that a "sawing" type illusion was first performed publicly by P. T. Selbit in January 1921. His presentations of what he titled "Sawing through a woman" made an enormous impact and greatly affected public expectations of stage magic for decades afterwards. Steinmeyer has explained:

Before Selbit's illusion, it was not a cliche that pretty ladies were teased and tortured by magicians. Since the days of Robert-Houdin, both men and women were used as the subjects for magic illusions. Victorian gowns often made it unrealistic for a lady to take part in an illusion or be pressed into a tight space.

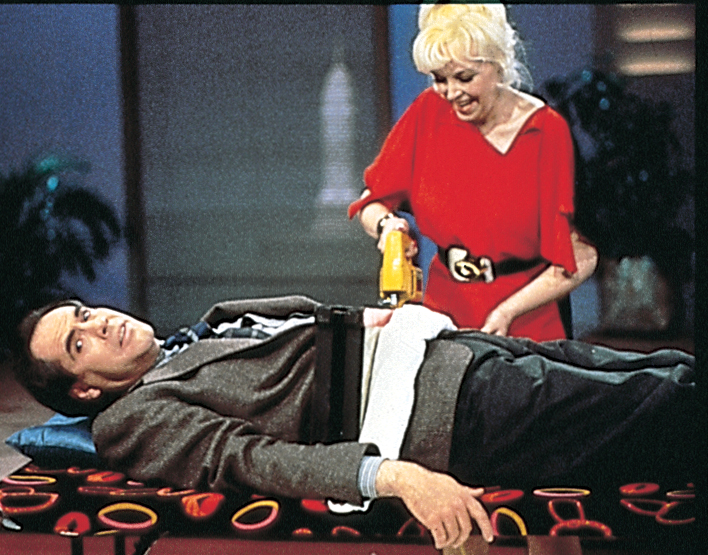
Magician Dorothy Dietrich sawing celebrity assistant and comedian Robert Klein in half on TV

One female magician Dorothy Dietrich has turned the tables and used men as assistants, sawing them in half.

Changes in fashion and great social upheavals during the first decades of the 20th century made Selbit's choice of "victim" both practical and popular. Steinmeyer notes: "During the 1900s, as a shapely leg became not only acceptable on the stage but admired, it was fashionable to perform magic with a cast of attractive ladies".

That was only part of the story, however. The trauma of war had helped to desensitize the public to violence and the emancipation of women had changed attitudes to them. Audiences were also tiring of the gentler forms of magic represented by the likes of John Nevil Maskelyne. It took something more shocking, such as the horrific productions of the Grand Guignol theatre, to cause a sensation in this age. Steinmeyer concludes that: "...beyond practical concerns, the image of the woman in peril became a specific fashion in entertainment".

In contrast to the publicity given to Selbit, the names of the assistants who made this influential act work have received almost no publicity. There were two premieres of the illusion. Selbit first presented it to an audience in December 1920; however, on that occasion the spectators were a small group of invited theatrical agents and promoters who Selbit hoped would book the act. The public premiere then occurred on 17 January 1921 at the Finsbury Park Empire music hall after Selbit was hired by the Moss Empire group. According to Steinmeyer, the assistant at the 1920 preview was Jan Glenrose, Selbit's main assistant at that time. The public performances featured principal assistant Betty Barker.

Many of these illusions, together with others that involve appearances, disappearances or escapes, involve assistants being shut in boxes of one sort or another. This has led to the nickname "box jumper" which, although it could be applied to a male assistant, is usually inferred to be a female assistant. One reason that has been given for the predominance of women in this role is that the illusions sometimes require an assistant that can fit into cramped spaces and women have an advantage in that they tend to be smaller and more limber than men.

Feminist critics have taken the above aspects of illusions and performances as evidence to support claims that magic is misogynistic, but this view has been contested by some magicians and assistants. However, a few prominent assistants have stated that they deserve better recognition for their efforts and achievements (see "Documentaries" below).

Some modern magic acts have preserved the glamorous elements of the female assistant iconography while attempting to give full recognition to female performers by billing women as equal partners in acts. A notable example was the husband and wife act The Pendragons, for which Charlotte Pendragon wore very revealing costumes and did traditional "box jumping" roles yet received equal billing with her husband. She was also honored in her own right as a top professional magician. Another example, although with more modest and conservative costuming, is Kristen Johnson, who receives equal billing with her husband Kevin Ridgeway when they perform together as a magic act and often stars in her own right as an escape artist.

== Notable assistants ==
- George White (Lifetime assistant to Howard Thurston)
- Gay Blackstone (wife and assistant to Harry Blackstone Jr.)
- Nani Darnell (wife and assistant to Mark Wilson)
- Adelaide Herrmann (wife and assistant to Alexander Hermann, who later became a magician in her own right following her husband's death)
- Bess Houdini (wife of Harry Houdini)
- Jinger Leigh
- Talma Le Roy (of Le Roy, Talma and Bosco)
- Debbie McGee (wife and assistant to Paul Daniels)
- Moi-Yo Miller (assistant to Dante)
- Morgan (assistant to John Bundy, also a magician and notable escape artist in her own right)
- Lilah Parsons
- Charlotte Pendragon
- Joanie Spina (principal assistant to David Copperfield who later became a magician in her own right)
- Frances Willard

== Assistants in art, fiction and movies ==
- The novel The Magician's Assistant, by Ann Patchett follows the character Sabine who was assistant to her magician husband Parsifal. After Parsifal's death Sabine is left to unravel the secrets of his life.
- The movie The Prestige (2006) features Scarlett Johansson as an assistant to a magician who is involved in a deadly feud with a competitor. In addition actress Piper Perabo plays the wife and performing partner of another magician.
- The movie Rough Magic (1995) features as its central character a magician's assistant played by Bridget Fonda.
- One of the central characters in the movie Leprechaun 3 is a magician's assistant called Tammy Larsen, played by actress Lee Armstrong, who appears in stage costume for much of the duration.
- The Disappearing Girl Trick (2001) is a short comedy film written and directed by David Jackson Willis, starring Susan Egan as a television producer who goes undercover as a magician's assistant to expose his method of performing the trick in the title.
- The DC Comics character of Zatanna is based upon the idea of a woman frequently being the glamorous assistant by flipping the trope and making her a main character in her own right.

== Documentaries ==
- Box Jumpers (2004) was a two-part radio documentary series about magicians' assistants that was made for BBC Radio 4 and presented by Debbie McGee.
- Women in Boxes (2007) is a feature-length documentary film featuring many of the magic world's most famous assistants and planned for theatrical release. It was made by Blaire Baron-Larsen, Harry Pallenberg, Phil Noyes and Dante Larsen.

== See also ==
- Target girl
- Damsel in distress (with regard to stereotyped female victim imagery)
