= Mismade Girl =

Illusion performed by magicians

The Mismade Girl is a stage illusion, designed by American magician Chuck Jones. It is a variation of the sawing a woman in half illusion.

== Basic effect ==
Four cubes with open tops and bottoms are stacked to form a cabinet. An assistant stands inside and the cabinet is closed. Metal blades are slid into the cabinet, apparently slicing the assistant into four pieces, and closing the top and bottom of each cube. The cubes are then unstacked, and restacked in a different order. Inset doors in the front of the cabinet are opened, and it appears that the assistant's body has divided and rearranged. The whole process is then reversed, and the assistant is released unharmed.

The Mismade Girl is often performed as a production effect—four cubes, each apparently too small to contain a person, are stacked into a cabinet, which is then opened to reveal someone inside.

Sometimes the routine will omit the second restacking, and the magician may instead exchange numbers or pictures on the front of those cubes which appear to be out of order, apparently magically moving the divided parts of the assistant's body into the correct order.

== Variants ==
There are two notable variants of the Mismade Girl.

- Illusionist Peter Gossamer performs a version called Totally Tubular, which uses a vertical tube, made of a dark translucent plastic, with a crude humaniform outline on the front. After restacking, rather than opening doors, lights are turned on inside, apparently showing the assistant divided into pieces, before then opening the front of the slice containing the assistant's head. Instead of reversing the process, sections of the outline are exchanged, and the blades then removed.
- A new version of the Mismade Girl has recently appeared, referred to either as the Italian Mismade, or Mismade Improved. In this version the assistant's hands and feet are in view for much of the illusion. This gives the impression that the illusion could not be performed using the method of the original Mismade Girl.

== Method ==
One method as to how this illusion might be achieved is as follows: when the cabinet is closed, the assistant crouches down into the bottom cube. Hidden compartments in three of the cubes hold fake body parts, which are revealed by simply rotating the relevant cube when it is restacked and opening an inset door in what was originally the rear of the cabinet. The blade or blades dividing the bottom cube from that above have a trap door, allowing the assistant to show her head—apparently disembodied.

== Exposure ==
The Masked Magician performed the Mismade Girl on his third television special, with Elizabeth Ramos as his assistant, and subsequently revealed the method as described above.
