= Guillotine (magic trick) =

The Guillotine is a magic trick where it appears that a blade of a guillotine passes through a person's neck without harming them. Variations on the theme have been performed for hundreds of years, with documented examples appearing in print in the 16th century. The most common modern variation is the finger guillotine or finger chopper, a pocket-sized version that appears to chop off the magician's finger.

== History ==
The Guillotine is probably the most famous member of a family of illusions featuring the apparent decapitation of a person or other living subject. Decapitation illusions have a long history, with the first documented example dating from the reign of Khufu in ancient Egypt, when a magician named Djedi is said to have decapitated and restored birds and other livestock, this story is believed to be fictional however.

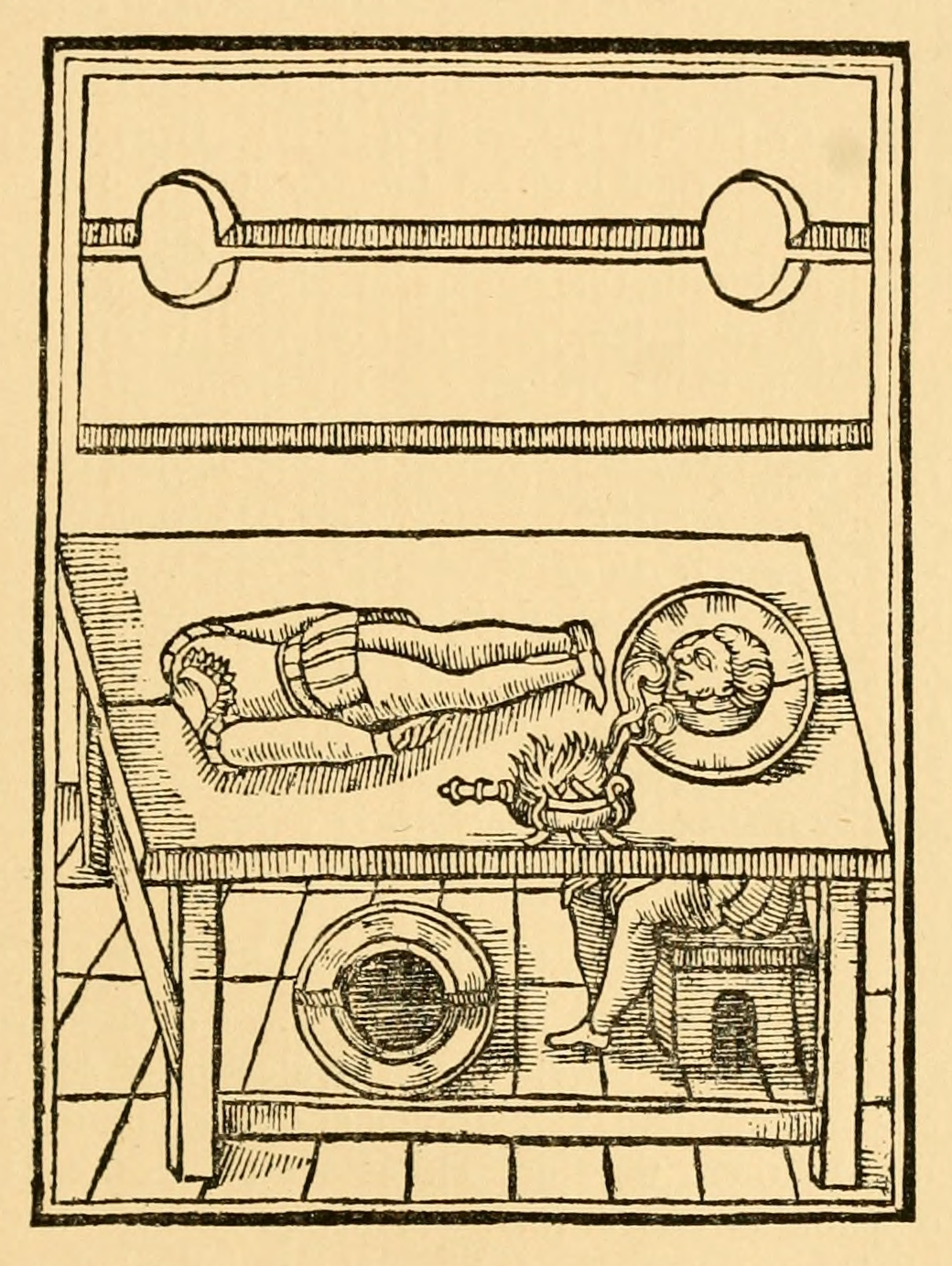
Scot's 1584 diagram explaining the "Decollation of John Baptist" illusion, in which the performer appears "to cut off ones head, and to laie it in a platter".

A method for performing a decapitation illusion, where a person's head is apparently severed and displayed on a plate next to their headless body, was described in The Discoverie of Witchcraft by Reginald Scot, published in 1584. Scot describes a table with two concealed holes, where the supposed victim sits beneath the table, raising their head through a hole which is surrounded by a platter. A second person lies flat on the table with their head descending into another hole, and their neck may be dressed with "a little dough kneded with bul/locks bloud" for effect. A decapitation illusion involving the apparent beheading of two boys and a dove was also recorded as being performed by Jacob Philadelphia in 1765.

Several modern guillotine and chopper illusions were designed by Cincinnati magician Lester Lake (a.k.a. Marvelo), who sold/traded some of these designs to Abbott's Magic Co. in Colon, Michigan. Lake's designs included, but were not limited to, the Extended-Blade Chopper (seen in the 1953 film Houdini), Abbott's "Giant Guillotine" and "Disecto" (wrist-cutter illusion). Lake also designed a guillotine illusion in which the assistant's actual head appeared to drop into a waiting bag when the blade fell.

== The traditional Guillotine illusion ==
In its most familiar form, the illusion uses an apparatus which generally resembles the type of guillotine historically used for executions. This has two uprights, with a stock at their lower end to restrain the neck of the "victim". The inner faces of the uprights contain tracks within which runs a blade, and the upper end of the uprights supports a mechanism for raising, holding and then releasing the blade. In some versions of the illusion, the apparatus also has a bench attached to the uprights at the same level as the neck stocks, on which the "victim" lies down - usually in a face-down position. On other versions, the "victim" simply kneels behind the apparatus and places their neck in the stocks.

This version of the illusion has sometimes been presented as an escape, with the magician themselves being locked into the guillotine, and having to attempt to free themselves before the blade falls. As this is usually performed, the magician apparently fails to free themselves in time and their head is apparently severed by the falling blade, only for the magician to dramatically reappear unharmed elsewhere in the theater. One such example was performed by Murray Walters in 1927. Magician/Escape Artist Bruce Bunnell performs a full-view guillotine escape in which he is straitjacketed, chained to the bascule, and the lunette padlocked shut.

== The "Head Chopper" ==
With the move away from theater-based grand illusion shows to smaller club venues in the 1960s, magicians needed a smaller and more portable version of the guillotine illusion, which led to the invention of the so-called "Head Chopper" versions. In these, the apparatus is reduced in size by the elimination of the tall uprights, leaving just the stocks, and a smaller blade which is thrust through the stocks manually by the magician.

A recent development of the illusion has seen the previously opaque stocks replaced by clear perspex, which allow the blade to be seen as it passes through them. In this version, a large blade is used, which completely fills the stocks when inserted, in place of the narrow blade used in earlier versions.

The device described above is patented under the US patent number 5605508.

== Finger guillotines ==
Sold more as a novelty item than a magic trick, finger guillotines are a minor variation on the basic theme. The setup is usually a small version of the full-sized devices, 4 to 6 inches (10–15 cm) tall, complete with side uprights. The trick is performed by inserting a finger through the "head hole" and then the blade is activated. In some versions, such as Chance Wolf's ultimate finger chopper, the finger is even seen to fall off. It is also shown in the movie Hostel as part of a torture museum that Paxton and his friends go to on their fateful holiday to Slovakia.
