= P. T. Selbit =

English magician, inventor and writer (1881–1938)

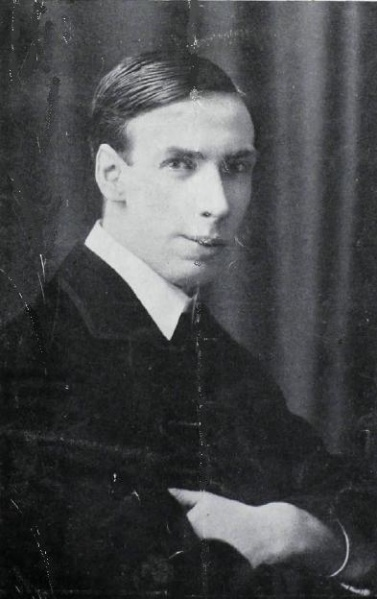
- Born: Percy Thomas Tibbles; 17 November 1881; London, England
- Died: 19 November 1938 (aged 57)
- Occupation: Magician

P. T. Selbit (1881–1938) was an English magician, inventor and writer who is credited with being the first person to perform the illusion of sawing a woman in half. Among magicians he was known for his inventiveness and entrepreneurial instinct and he is credited with creating a long list of successful stage illusions.

== Early life and career ==
His birth name was Percy Thomas Tibbles and he was born in Hampstead, London. He developed an interest in magic in his youth, when he was apprenticed to a silversmith. The basement of the silversmith's shop was leased to magician and inventor Charles Morritt who used it to develop new tricks and the young Tibbles would sneak in to study these when Morritt was away. Tibbles began doing a coin and card manipulation act under the stage name P. T. Selbit, which he created by spelling his last name backwards and dropping one of the "B"s. He also used Selbit as a pen name, working as a journalist for a theatrical paper, writing a magic handbook and editing a trade journal for magicians.

Between 1902 and 1908, Selbit worked in music halls under the name Joad Heteb. He had deduced audiences wanted something that seemed exotic so he donned greasepaint, robes and a wig to perform as a "pseudo-Egyptian" character. This episode reflects two characteristics that marked much of his magic career: inventive ability and an entrepreneurial desire to keep pulling in audiences with something new. In 1910 Selbit toured with an illusion titled "Spirit Paintings", in which audience members were asked to name an artist and then pictures in the style of that artist mysteriously appeared on illuminated canvases. His next tour featured a trick called "The Mighty Cheese", in which audience members were invited to try to tip over a huge circular model of a cheese wheel, which they found impossible to do because it contained a gyroscope.

In 1912 Selbit began working for John Nevil Maskelyne and David Devant, who had come to dominate the business of magic shows in Britain with their productions at the Egyptian Hall and St George's Hall. Selbit's first role with Maskelyne and Devant was to tour music halls and American vaudeville during 1912 and 1913 presenting Devant's "Window of a Haunted House" illusion. In 1914 Selbit introduced the "Walking through a Wall" illusion at St. George's Hall.

In 1919, Selbit staged a séance at his own flat in Bloomsbury in London. The spiritualist Arthur Conan Doyle who attended the séance was unaware of the trickery and declared the clairvoyance manifestations to be genuine.

== Correspondence with Harry Houdini ==
Selbit had performed an illusion known as "Walking Through a Brick Wall" at St. George's Hall, London in 1913. The American magician Harry Houdini had performed the illusion a year later at Hammerstein's Roof Garden in New York, 1914.

Friends of Selbit in England stated that Houdini had originally observed Selbit perform the illusion in London and had stolen it as his own. Houdini responded by claiming that he had purchased the rights from the owner of the illusion, Sidney Josolyne. Selbit rejected the claims of Josolyne and stated that he was the originator of the illusion, and this caused a dispute with Houdini.

In Selbit's illusion, an attractive young lady went through the wall. This was different than Houdini's illusion as he had gone through the wall himself. The illusion worked by use of a trapdoor that went underneath the wall.

== Sawing through a woman ==
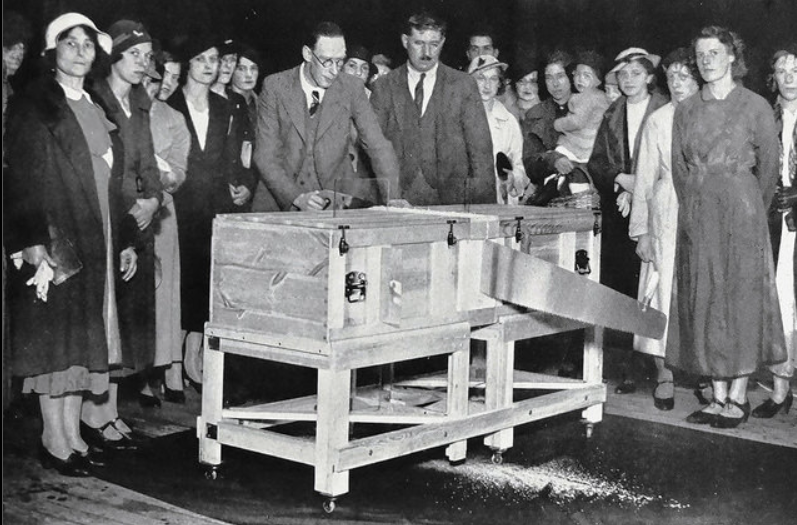
P. T. Selbit performing the sawing a woman in half illusion.

There are many versions of the illusion of sawing through a woman or sawing a woman in half as well as other illusions that are based around that theme. There remains a debate as to the exact origins of the idea, with some suggesting there is a record of it from 1809 or that the idea can be traced back to ancient Egypt. Modern magic inventor Jim Steinmeyer has written that a description of the illusion was published by the great French magician Jean Robert-Houdin in 1858, but Robert-Houdin's idea remained just that, a written description of an effect. Selbit is generally recognised as the first magician to perform such a trick on a public stage, which he did at the Finsbury Park Empire theatre in London on 17 January 1921. In fact, Selbit had previously performed the illusion in December 1920 before a select audience of promoters and theatrical agents at the St. George's Hall to try to persuade one of them to book him to perform it.

In Selbit's version a female assistant got into a wooden box that was similar in proportion to a coffin but slightly larger. She was secured there by ropes around her wrists, ankles and neck. The box was then closed, obscuring her from view. After the box was placed in a horizontal position, Selbit sawed through the middle of it with a large hand saw. The impression given to the audience was that, because of the restraints and limited room in the box, the assistant's waist must have been in the path of the saw and she would surely have been cut through. Finally the box was opened and the assistant, still with ropes attached, was revealed as unharmed.

The impact of the illusion was immense and Selbit became a box office hit. Jim Steinmeyer attributes the success and influence of the illusion not just to Selbit's inventiveness but also to his timing. By 1920 the world was tiring of older styles of magic. The changes to the public psyche wrought by the trauma of the First World War together with rapid social and technological change meant that the time was right for a new and shocking style of magic. The sawing illusion was pivotal in creating the cliché of the pretty female assistant subjected to torture and mutilation by magicians. Before Selbit, male and female assistants had both been used in illusions.

In Victorian times the bulky nature of female clothes often precluded the use of a female assistant in illusions which required a performer to get into a confined space. By 1920, fashions had changed and it became not only acceptable but desirable to have a cast of attractive women displaying shapely limbs. Steinmeyer has noted that, "beyond practical concerns, the image of the woman in peril became a specific fashion in entertainment".

Other magicians rapidly attempted to emulate and improve upon Selbit's trick. Within months, American magician Horace Goldin presented a version in which the assistant's head, hands and feet were seen in full view throughout the trick. Goldin was aggressive in the use of legal measures to try to prevent anyone from competing with him. When Selbit arrived in America to tour with his sawing illusion he found that Goldin had registered many possible titles for the act with the Vaudeville Managers' Protective Agency. Selbit was thus forced to bill his act as "The Divided Woman", which had less dramatic impact than the idea of sawing through a woman. Selbit tried to sue Goldin for stealing his idea but the action failed when it was ruled that Goldin's illusion was sufficiently different.

The sawing illusion went through many developments after Selbit and other performers achieved fame and great commercial success for particular variants. Goldin later produced sawing illusions that dispensed with a covering box and ultimately used a large buzzsaw.

Another variant, which owed something to Selbit's original, has been attributed to Alan Wakeling. However Selbit retains his place in history as the first to present a sawing trick, and thus as a figure who shaped popular perceptions of stage illusions for decades.

=== Revival ===
In the 1990s, the renowned English magician Paul Daniels performed a homage to Selbit on his television series Secrets. Describing the origins of the trick, Daniels performs the sawing a woman in half illusion in its original form, in the style of Selbit, also including Selbit's development of using panes of glass, giving the effect that the woman also has her head and legs cut off and her body cut in half vertically.

== Subsequent career and illusions ==
Following his court battles in America, which effectively prevented him achieving the same level of success there as he had in Britain, Selbit returned home in 1922. He turned his attention to developing new illusions in the hope of creating something that would repeat the impact of sawing. He is credited with devising Girl/Man without a Middle (1924), Through the Eye of a Needle (1924), The Million Dollar Mystery, Stretching a Girl, and Avoiding the Crush, Selbit's Blocks and possibly also the Siberian Chain Escape. Although some effects were highly ingenious and several were sufficiently successful that they continued to be performed by subsequent generations of magicians, none achieved the fame of sawing.

In 1928 Selbit went to the aid of Morritt, the magician from whom he had surreptitiously learned so much at the start of his career. Morritt had been arrested and charged with "obtaining money under false pretences" as the result of a misunderstanding over the way he was scraping a living from an act titled "Man in a Trance". Selbit and Will Goldston helped to fund Morritt's defence and he was eventually acquitted.

== Published work ==
- The Magician's Handbook (1901)
- The Magical Entertainer (1906)
- Conjuring Patter (1907)
- The Magic Art of Entertaining (1907)
- From 1905 to 1910, he edited a magic magazine called The Wizard, which, under another editor, later became The Magic Wand.
