= Jim Steinmeyer =

Magical illusion designer

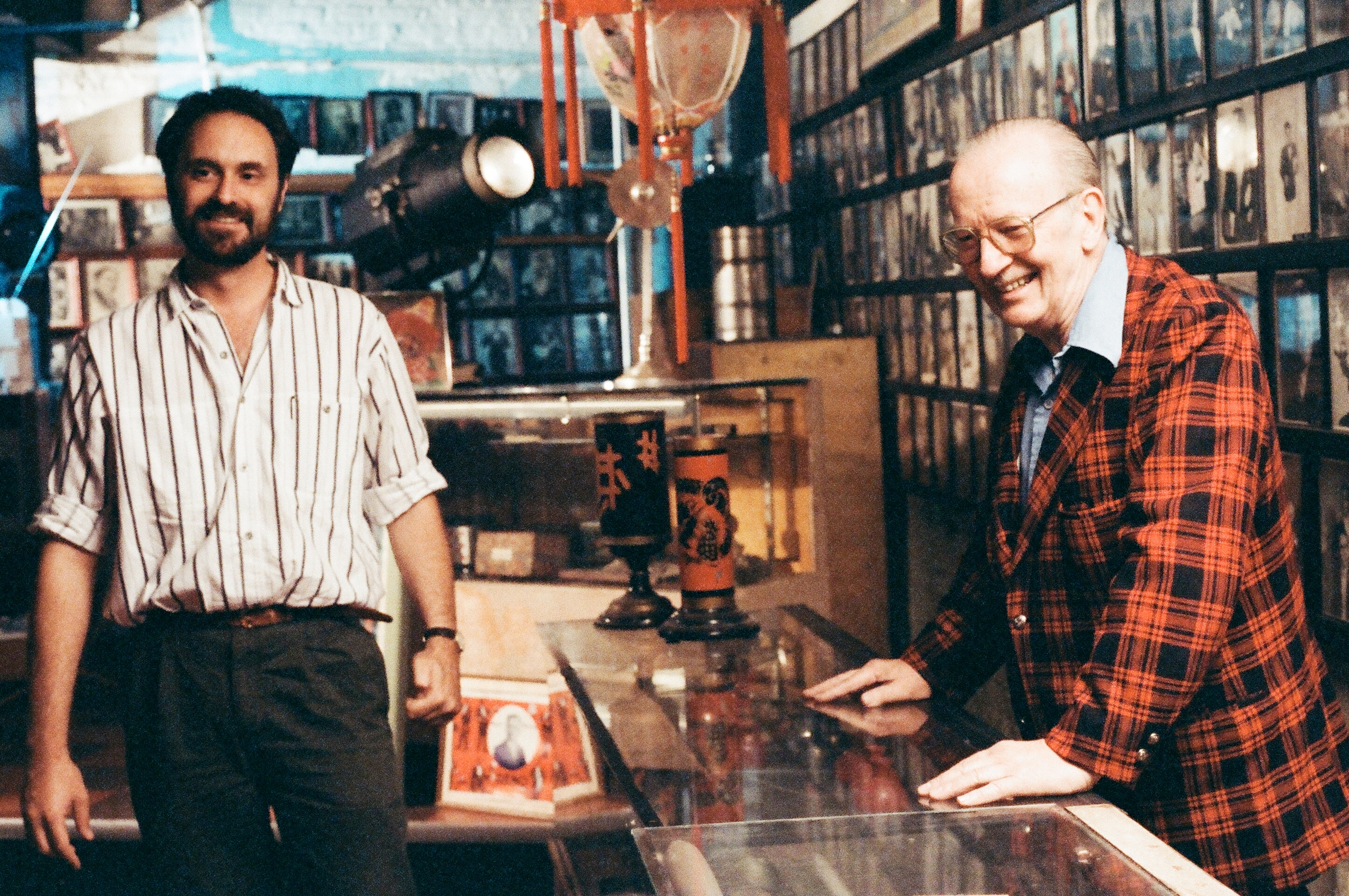
- Working on British TV series The Secret Cabaret (with, right, Jay Marshall)
- Born: November 1, 1958 (age 67); Oak Park, Illinois
- Education: Loyola University Chicago
- Occupation: Illusion designer

Jim Steinmeyer (born November 1, 1958) is an American author, inventor, and designer of magical illusions and theatrical special effects. He holds four US patents in the field of illusion apparatus, including a modern version of the Pepper's Ghost illusion. Steinmeyer has consulted for many famous magicians, including David Copperfield, Doug Henning, Siegfried and Roy, and Lance Burton.

Steinmeyer is also known for his work on Broadway, and received two Drama Desk nominations for his effects in Merlin and Into the Woods. He has also designed illusions for Disney's stage productions of Aladdin, Beauty and the Beast, and Mary Poppins.

Steinmeyer has written multiple books on the history of magic, including the Los Angeles Times bestseller Hiding the Elephant.

== Early life ==
Steinmeyer was born in Oak Park, Illinois. He grew up in Hinsdale, Illinois and attended Loyola University Chicago.

== Magic career ==
=== Illusion design ===
For a number of years, Steinmeyer was the magic designer to Doug Henning, and invented illusions for Henning's television specials and two Broadway shows. He has served as a magic consultant to Siegfried and Roy, David Copperfield and Lance Burton, as well as creating magic effects for Orson Welles, Harry Blackstone, The Pendragons, Simon Drake, Ricky Jay, Jason Bishop, and many others.

For Copperfield, Steinmeyer created the illusion of the Vanishing Statue of Liberty, which was featured on a live television special in 1983. Musician Alice Cooper used a Steinmeyer-designed effect in his 2009 tour, where at one point he is confined inside a polished metal torture device, then impaled with a rack of sharp spikes.

Other notable stage illusions designed by Steinmeyer include:

- Origami – an effect performed by both Henning and Copperfield and which has since been widely imitated. It was performed by an America's Got Talent contestant in 2010. An oriental-themed box is seen on a thin table, backed by a mirror. The magician's assistant steps into the box, which folds down into a small cube, 12 inches square. The cube is penetrated by three swords before being unfolded, allowing the assistant to emerge unharmed.
- Interlude – originally titled Permeability, this illusion was performed by The Pendragons for many years as Interlude and is now commonly known as such. The magician is held in a metal frame and the magician's assistant passes through from back to front, appearing to pass through the magician's torso.
- Modern Art – in which the magician's assistant enters a cabinet, the top half of which then slides across a blade, appearing to cut the performer in two through the waist.
- Osmosis – in which a performer seems to disappear inside the magician.
- Op-Art – the magician's assistant seems to gradually disappear behind a number of square panels, leaving only the head visible.
- The Lady in the Puzzle – comprises a number of large puzzle pieces which are inserted into an empty frame and rearranged several times to display different images. Finally they are removed to reveal the magician's assistant.

=== Theatre ===
As a researcher of magic history and a designer of special effects for the theatre, Steinmeyer's work has been featured in theatrical shows such as Beauty and the Beast, Into the Woods, Mary Poppins and Aladdin. He also created several enhanced effects for the Las Vegas production of Phantom of the Opera, including a special version of Christine's dressing room mirror in Act I and Raoul's torture cage in Act II.

=== Television and other media ===
Steinmeyer has worked as a producer and magic consultant for many magic television shows, and as a consultant and concept designer for Walt Disney Imagineering, where he developed theme park attractions for The Walt Disney Company.

He was the writer and producer of the A&E Network's The Story of Magic, a documentary on the history of magicians.

In 1986 Steinmeyer served as technical advisor for the NBC crime drama series Blacke's Magic, starring Hal Linden as magician Alexander Blacke.

In 2014 Steinmeyer served as a magic trick consultant/ghostwriter on Neil Patrick Harris's book Choose Your Own Autobiography.

In 2025 he received a magic credit on the feature film Now You See Me: Now You Don't.

=== Lectures ===
Steinmeyer lectures on magic and creating other theatrical effects at a variety of places including The Magic Castle, The Magic Circle in London, FISM, and TED (1998) Conference in Monterey, California.

=== Awards ===
In 1991 the Academy of Magical Arts (The Magic Castle) awarded Steinmeyer The Creative Fellowship, recognizing his continuing inventions. The Fellowship awards were created in 1968, and are the magic industry's equivalent of the "Oscars". At that time Steinmeyer was 32 and was the youngest person to ever win a fellowship.

In 1996 Steinmeyer received the Milbourne Christopher award in recognition of contribution to magic design and in 2002, he received his second Fellowship award from the Academy of Magical Arts, this time collecting the Literary Fellowship Award.

In 2020, Steinmeyer received the Allan Slaight Lifetime Achievement Award.

== Books ==
He has written many books on magic's history and technical books on techniques of illusions. Recent works include:

- The Complete Jarrett, Hahne (2001) ASIN: B0014JAOXO
- Jim Steinmeyer's Impuzzibilities Strangely Self-Working Conjuring, Hahne (2002) ASIN: B000HAUEH2
- Hiding the Elephant – How Magicians Invented the Impossible and Learned to Disappear, Carroll & Graf (2004) ISBN 0-7867-1401-8
- The Glorious Deception: The Double Life of William Robinson, Aka Chung Ling Soo, the "Marvelous Chinese Conjurer" Carroll & Graf Publishers (2005), ISBN 0-7867-1512-X
- The Magic of Alan Wakeling: The Works of a Master Magician, Carroll & Graf (Nov 2006), ISBN 0-7867-1807-2
- Art and Artifice: And Other Essays of Illusion, Carroll & Graf (Nov 2006), ISBN 0-7867-1806-4
- Charles Fort: The Man Who Invented the Supernatural, Heinemann (May 2008), ISBN 0-434-01629-2
- Technique and Understanding. Hahne. 2009.
- The Last Greatest Magician in the World: Howard Thurston Versus Houdini & the Battles of the American Wizards. New York: Jeremy P. Tarcher/Penguin, a member of Penguin Group. 2011. ISBN 978-1-58542-845-8. OCLC 646111788.
- Who Was Dracula? – Bram Stoker's Trail of Blood, Jeremy P. Tarcher (2013) ISBN 978-0-14-242188-8

== Patents ==
- Hologram Illusion, Issued March 1, 1994, US Patent No. 5,291,297.
- Origami Illusion, Issued March 29, 1994, US Patent No. D345,595.
