= Harry Blackstone =

Harry Blackstone may refer to:

- Harry Blackstone Sr. (1885–1965), American magician known as "The Great Blackstone" and father of Harry Blackstone, Jr.
- Harry Blackstone Jr. (1934–1997), American stage magician and television performer of the late 20th century

== See also ==
- Harry Blackstone Copperfield Dresden, fictional detective and magician
