= Tom Mullica =

American magician and comedian

- Born: Thomas Blaine Mullica; August 19, 1948; Waupun, Wisconsin, U.S.
- Died: February 18, 2016 (aged 67); Las Vegas, Nevada, U.S.
- Occupations: Magician, comedian, ventriloquist, mime artist, actor, clown
- Years active: 1970–2016
- Known for: Television and stage appearances as a magician and comedian
- Partner: Stephen Mullica (1984-2016)

Thomas Blaine Mullica (August 19, 1948 – February 18, 2016) was an American comedy magician, impressionist and actor who performed on television specials and appeared on Late Night with David Letterman, The World's Greatest Magic, Viva Variety and Penn & Teller's Sin City.

Mullica appeared on Late Night with David Letterman, where he performed his signature effect of the manipulation and vanishing of several cigarettes in his mouth.

He also performed at the Just for Laughs Comedy Festival and toured the United States and Canada with RED: A Performance Tribute, a Red Skelton tribute show which Mullica wrote and starred in as Skelton and his characters.

== Personal life ==
Mullica was born in Waupun, Wisconsin, on August 19, 1948. When he was five years old, he wanted to be a clown. On his seventh birthday, his mother bought him a "Sneaky Pete Magic Kit" for Christmas.

In 1966, Mullica graduated from Waupun High School, after which he enlisted in the US Army at age 18. He served three years in Korea and Germany. Once he had finished his military service he moved to Colon, Michigan, where he built illusions and demonstrated magic for Abbott's Magic Company.

Mullica then moved to Atlanta, Georgia, where he attended bartending school. In 1976, he opened his own nightclub called The Tom-Foolery Magic Bar Theater.

Entertainer Red Skelton visited the Tom-Foolery in 1980 and they became fast friends. The Tom-Foolery closed in 1987. Mullica asked Skelton for his advice after the closure, and Skelton suggested that he take his best material and perform it as a pantomime with music. This would eliminate any language barrier and could be performed anywhere in the world. Mullica took Skelton's advice and rehearsed for six months. He then moved to Paris, France where he worked at the Crazy Horse Saloon.

In 1984, Mullica met his life time partner Stephen Mullica. At the same year, he won the Siegfried & Roy Golden Lion Award at the Magic Desert Seminar in Las Vegas.

In 1991, he returned to the United States to continue his comedy magic career. He began writing RED (A Performance Tribute) in 1996, which he performed in theatres throughout the US and Canada.

In 2010, Mullica was diagnosed with acute myelogenous leukemia and underwent a successful stem cell transplant. In 2015 he announced he had been five years cancer-free.

In July 2013, Mullica helped dedicate the Red Skelton Museum & Education Center.

== Death ==
On February 15, 2016, Mullica was placed in an induced coma following complications stemming from a routine hernia operation, which caused him to have several strokes. He subsequently suffered from organ and liver failure. On February 18, it was decided to take Mullica off life support. He was 67 years of age.

== Awards ==
- Siegfried & Roy Golden Lion Award, Magic Desert Seminar (1984 in Las Vegas, United States)
- Baird/Foster Award for Manipulation, Abbott's Magic Get Together (1992 in Colon, United States)
