= Bellamie Blackstone =

American television producer

- Born: January 8, 1980 (age 46); San Bernardino, California, U.S.
- Education: University of Southern California
- Occupations: Television producer; executive producer
- Years active: 2004-present
- Known for: Executive producer of Wheel of Fortune (2022-present)
- Spouse: Shane Pritchett (m. 2019; died 2023)
- Children: 1
- Relatives: Harry Blackstone Sr. (grandfather); Harry Blackstone Jr. (father); Gay Blackstone (mother)

Bellamie Blackstone (born January 8, 1980) is an American television producer and executive producer. She is best known as the executive producer and showrunner of Wheel of Fortune and its spin-off Celebrity Wheel of Fortune since 2022. Her other credits include executive producing roles on the shows @midnight (2013–2017), I Love You, America with Sarah Silverman (2017–2018), and History of Swear Words (2021).

== Early life ==
Bellamie Blackstone was born on January 8, 1980, in San Bernardino, California, coming from a family deeply rooted in the history of entertainment and magic, being the granddaughter of legendary illusionist Harry Blackstone Sr., known for his pioneering contributions to stage magic including grand illusions and theatrical performances, as well as the daughter of famed magician Harry Blackstone Jr., who carried on the family legacy in magic and entertainment, and Gay Blackstone. During her early childhood, she traveled approximately 250 days a year with her parents' touring magic show. She graduated from the University of Southern California with a degree in theater.

== Career ==
=== Early career ===
Blackstone's earliest credit came in 2004 as production manager on the television series Score. She continued in similar capacities over the next few years, including as production manager on My Own in 2006 and on the game show 1 vs. 100 in 2006 for five episodes. By 2007, Blackstone transitioned into line producing roles, beginning with Deal or No Deal, where she served as line producer across numerous episodes from 2007 to 2009.

=== Comedy and late night series ===
From 2013-2017, Blackstone worked as a producer on Comedy Central's @midnight, a late-night comedy game show hosted by Chris Hardwick that featured improvisational challenges and celebrity panels discussing internet culture and trending topics. For 2017-2018, she served as a producer on the Hulu series I Love You, America with Sarah Silverman, which featured host Sarah Silverman exploring political and cultural issues through comedic segments and conversations with guests. For 2019-2021, she held a producer role on the ABC revival of Kids Say the Darndest Things, a family-oriented comedy series hosted by Tiffany Haddish that captured humorous and unfiltered responses from children during interviews.

=== Netflix projects ===
In 2021, Bellamie Blackstone served as executive producer, showrunner, and writer on the Netflix documentary comedy series History of Swear Words, which premiered on January 5 of that year. The six-part series, hosted by Nicolas Cage, examines the etymology, cultural usage, scientific aspects, and societal impact of various curse words through interviews with comedians, linguists, and historians. As showrunner, Blackstone oversaw the project's creative direction and production, describing the experience of developing a series about profanity amid the unpredictability of 2020 as "cathartic." Her writing contributions helped shape the series' blend of educational content and comedic exploration of language.

=== Wheel of Fortune ===
In March 2022, Bellamie Blackstone was named executive producer of Wheel of Fortune, as the syndicated game show prepared to enter its 40th season. She assumed the role following the departure of Mike Richards, with Steve Schwartz promoted to supervising producer. In addition, Blackstone also serves as executive producer on the spin-off Celebrity Wheel of Fortune, a position she has held since its third season.

As showrunner and executive producer, Blackstone oversees the creative direction, production, and day-to-day operations of Wheel of Fortune, guiding the series through a period of significant transition including host changes (from Pat Sajak to Ryan Seacrest) and efforts to maintain the show's enduring popularity. In an October 2024 interview with Deadline Hollywood, she discussed her approach to the role, emphasizing the balance between preserving the series' classic elements and adapting to contemporary viewing habits.

== Personal life ==
On August 10, 2019, Bellamie Blackstone married Shane Pritchett, whom she met in early 2018. In 2021, she gave birth to a daughter, Lilette. The couple shared a mutual love of travel, adventure, entertaining, and family. Pritchett died on May 25, 2023 at the age of 51 due to complications from a degenerative lung condition following two lung transplants.
