= Top hat =

Tall, flat-crowned formal hat

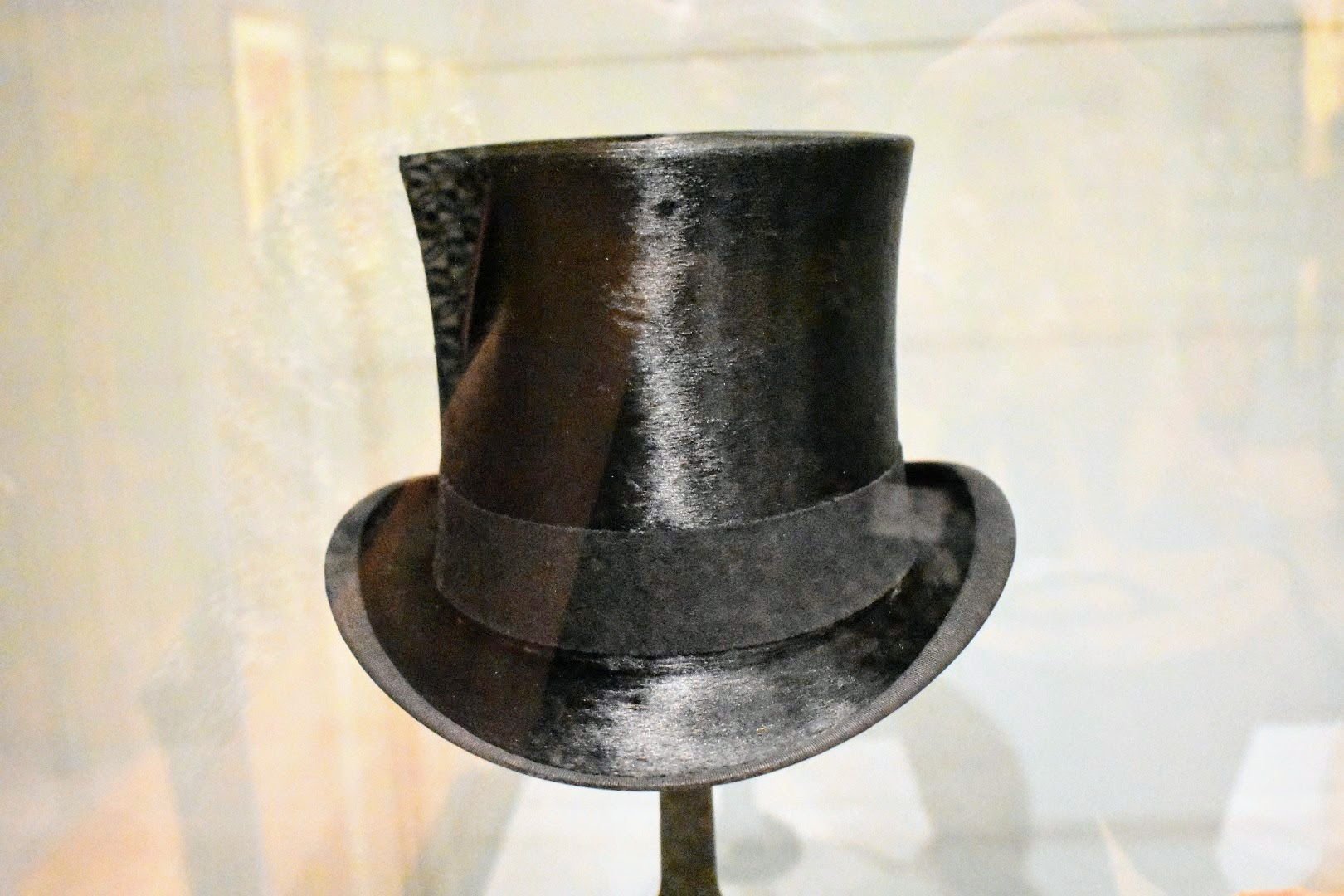
c. 1910 top hat by Alfred Bertiel

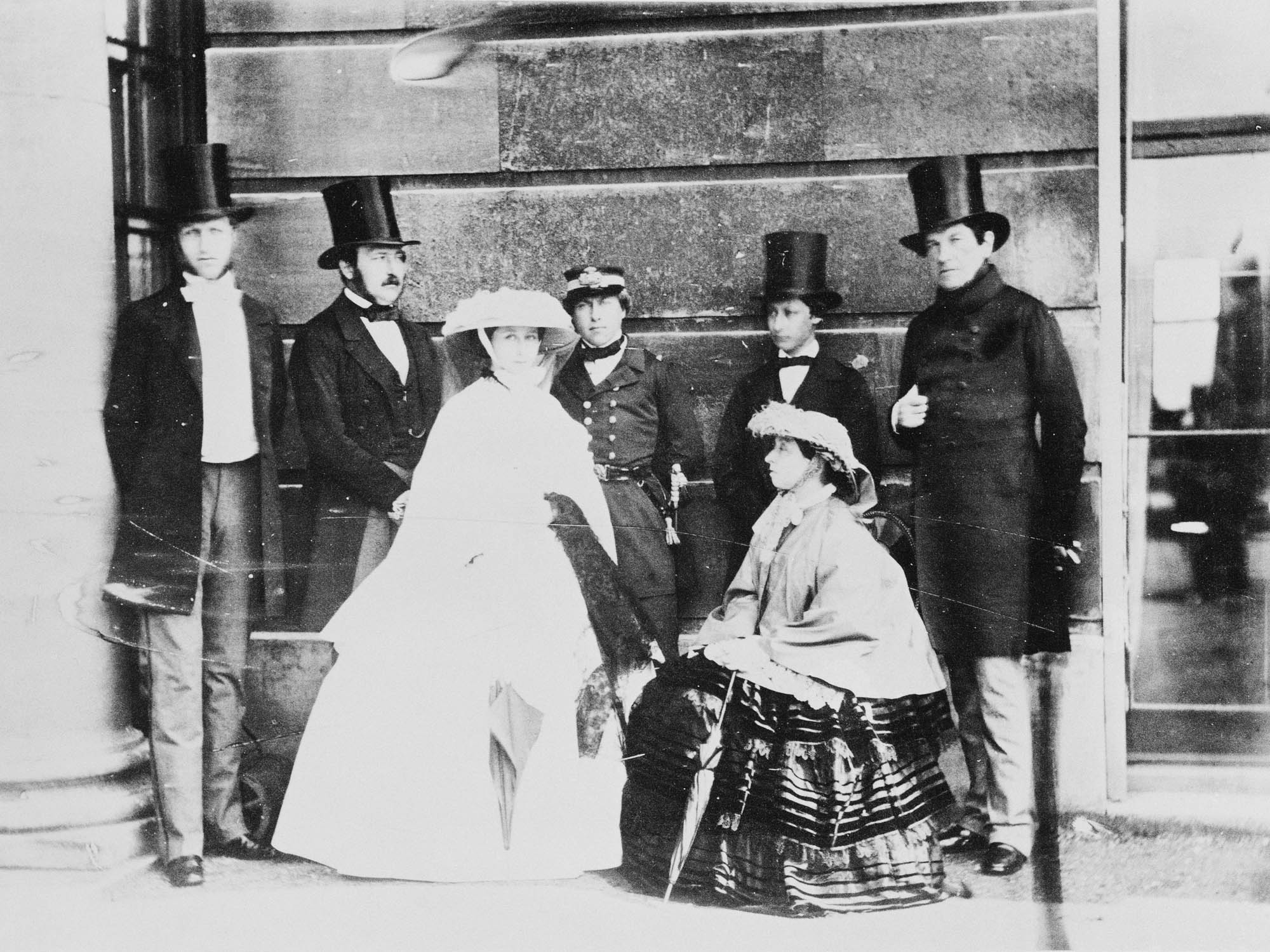
European royalty, 1859

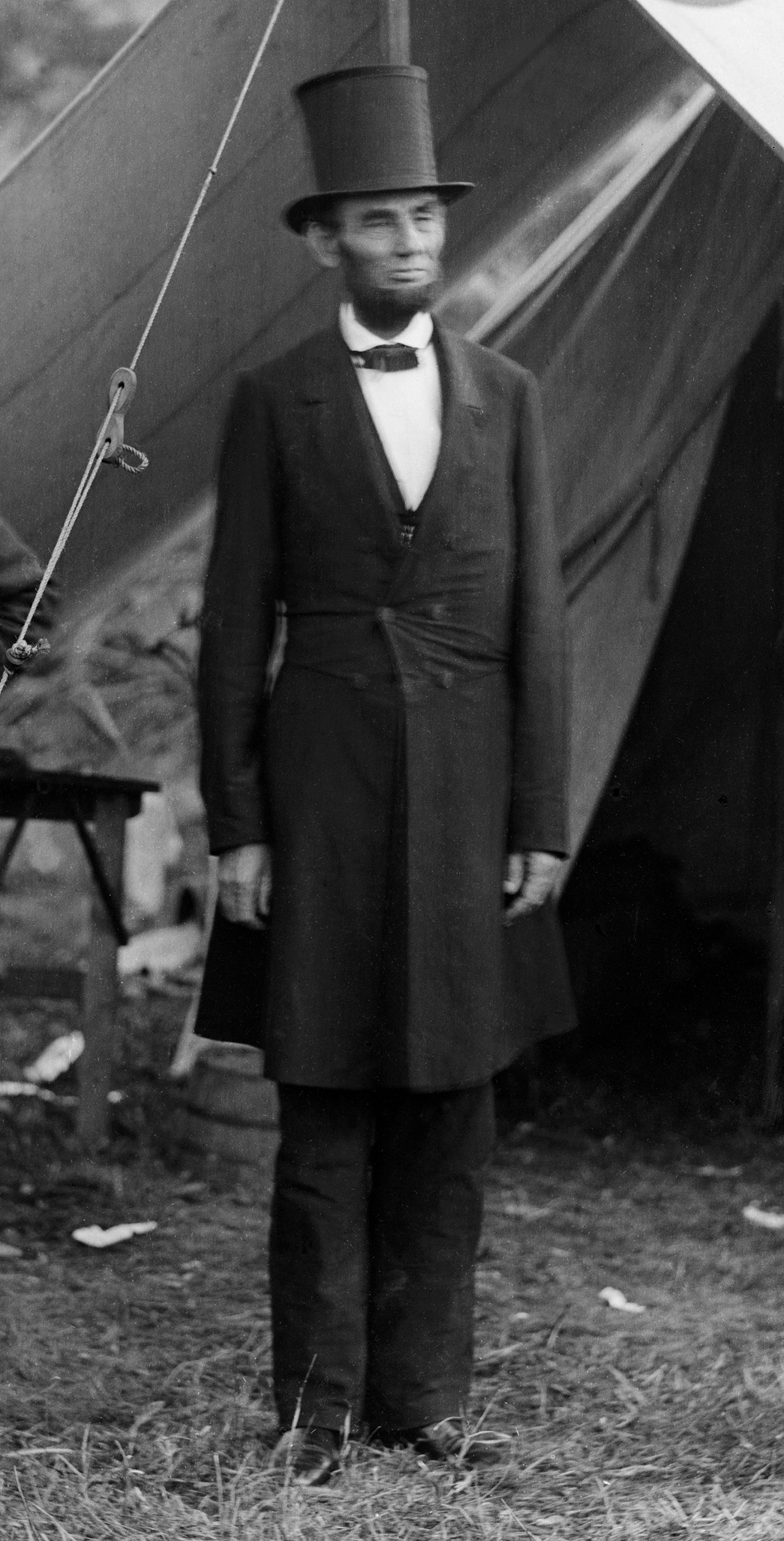
16th U.S. President Abraham Lincoln at Antietam during the American Civil War in 1862, wearing his distinctive "stovepipe" top hat.

A top hat (also called a high hat, or, informally, a topper) is a tall, flat-crowned hat traditionally associated with formal wear in Western dress codes, meaning white tie, morning dress, or frock coat. Traditionally made of black silk or sometimes grey, the top hat emerged in Western fashion by the end of the 18th century. Although such a hat fell out of fashion through the 20th century, being almost entirely phased out by the time of the counterculture of the 1960s, it remains a formal fashion accessory. A collapsible variant of a top hat, developed in the 19th century, is known as an opera hat.

Perhaps inspired by the early modern era capotain, higher-crowned dark felt hats with wide brims emerged as a country leisurewear fashion along with the Age of Revolution around the 1770s. Around the 1780s, the justaucorps was replaced by the previously casual frock and dress coat. With the introduction of the top hat in the early 1790s, the tricorne and bicorne hats began falling out of fashion. By the start of the 19th century, the directoire style dress coat with top hat was widely introduced as city wear for the upper and middle classes in all urban areas of the Western world. The justaucorps was replaced in all but the most formal court affairs. Around the turn of the 19th century, although for a few decades beaver hats were popular, black silk became the standard, sometimes varied by grey ones. While the dress coat was replaced by the frock coat from the 1840s as conventional formal daywear, top hats continued to be worn with frock coats as well as with what became known as formal evening wear white tie. Towards the end of the 19th century, whereas the white tie with black dress coat remained fixed, frock coats were gradually replaced by morning dress, along with top hats.

After World War I, the 1920s saw widespread introduction of semi-formal black tie and informal wear suits that were worn with less formal hats such as bowler hats, homburgs, boaters, and fedoras respectively, in established society. After World War II, white tie, morning dress, and frock coats, along with their counterpart, the top hat, started to become confined to high society, politics and international diplomacy. Following the counterculture of the 1960s, its use declined further along with the use also of daily informal hats by men.

Yet, along with traditional formal wear, the top hat continues to be applicable for the most formal occasions, including weddings and funerals, in addition to certain audiences, balls, and horse racing events, such as the Royal Enclosure at Royal Ascot and the Queen's Stand of Epsom Derby. It also remains part of the formal dress of those occupying prominent positions in certain traditional British institutions, such as officers at the Bank of England, certain City stock exchange officials, occasionally members of Lincoln's Inn and those working at the Law Courts, judges of the Chancery Division and King's Counsel, boy-choristers of King's College Choir, dressage horseback riders, and servants or doormen attired in livery.

As part of traditional formal wear, in popular culture the top hat has sometimes been associated with the upper class and used by satirists and social critics as a symbol of capitalism or the world of business, as with the Monopoly Man or Scrooge McDuck. The top hat also forms part of the traditional dress of Uncle Sam, a symbol of the United States, generally striped in red, white, and blue. Furthermore, ever since the famous "Pulling a Rabbit out of a Hat" stunt of Louis Comte in 1814, the top hat remains associated with hat tricks and stage magic costumes.

== Name ==
The top hat is also known as a beaver hat or silk hat, in reference to its material, as well as casually as chimney pot hat or stove pipe hat. In many languages of Europe, such as Italian, German, Russian and Hungarian, the term for top hat translates as 'cylinder hat', due to its top having a cylindrical shape.

== History ==
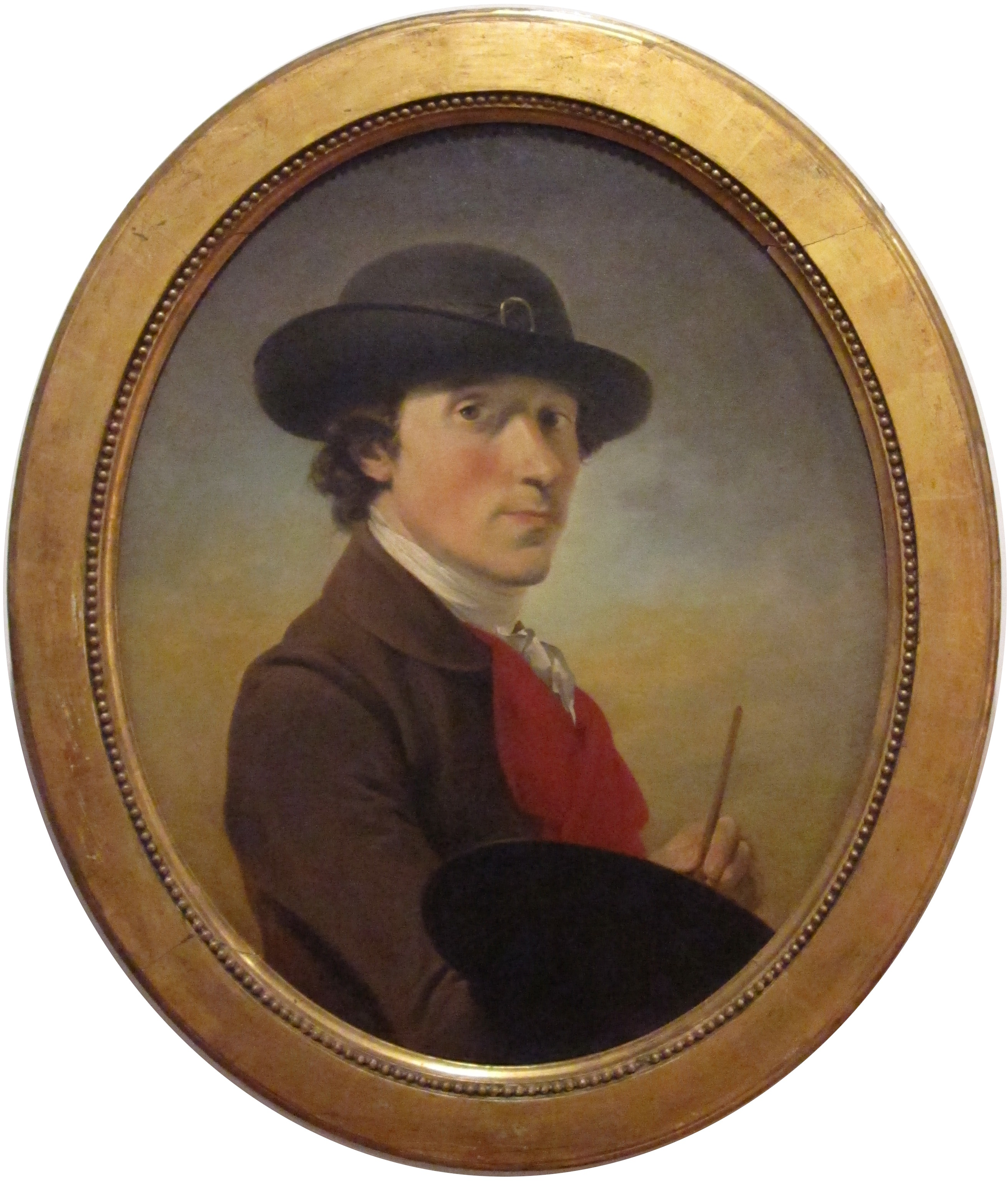
Self portrait (c. 1770) of Peter Falconet (1741–1791). One of the earliest depicted prototypes of what became the top hat. In early prototypes, a sash around the crown was closed by a buckle. This was later dropped, in the same way as shoe buckles for male pumps were replaced by bow ties around the turn of the 19th century.

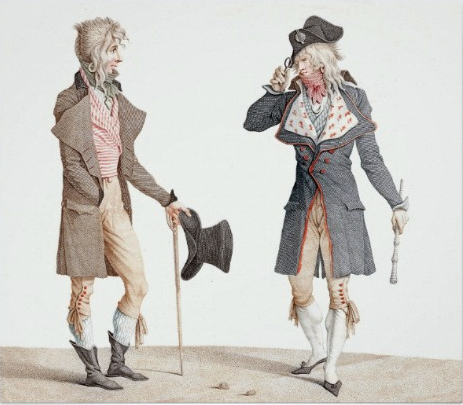
Carle Vernet's 1796 painting showing two decadent French "Incredibles" greeting each other, one with what appears to be a top hat.

According to fashion historians, the top hat may have descended directly from the sugarloaf hat; otherwise it is difficult to establish provenance for its creation. Gentlemen began to replace the tricorne with the top hat at the end of the 18th century; a painting by Charles Vernet of 1796, Un Incroyable, shows a French dandy (one of the Incroyables et Merveilleuses) with such a hat. The first silk top hat in England is credited to George Dunnage, a hatter from Middlesex, in 1793. The invention of the top hat is often erroneously credited to a haberdasher named John Hetherington.

Within 30 years top hats had become popular with all social classes, with even workmen wearing them. At that time those worn by members of the upper classes were usually made of felted beaver fur; the generic name "stuff hat" was applied to hats made from various non-fur felts. The hats became part of the uniforms worn by policemen and postmen (to give them the appearance of authority); since these people spent most of their time outdoors, their hats were topped with black oilcloth.

=== 19th century ===
Between the latter part of 18th century and the early part of the 19th century, felted beaver fur was slowly replaced by silk "hatter's plush", though the silk topper met with resistance from those who preferred the beaver hat.

The 1840s and the 1850s saw it reach its most extreme form, with ever-higher crowns and narrow brims. The stovepipe hat was a variety with mostly straight sides, while one with slightly convex sides was called the "chimney pot". The style most commonly referred to as the stovepipe was popularized in the United States by Abraham Lincoln during his presidency; though it is postulated that he may never have called it stovepipe himself, but merely a silk hat or a plug hat. Lincoln often carried documents and letters inside the hat. One of Lincoln's top hats is kept on display at the National Museum of American History in Washington, DC.

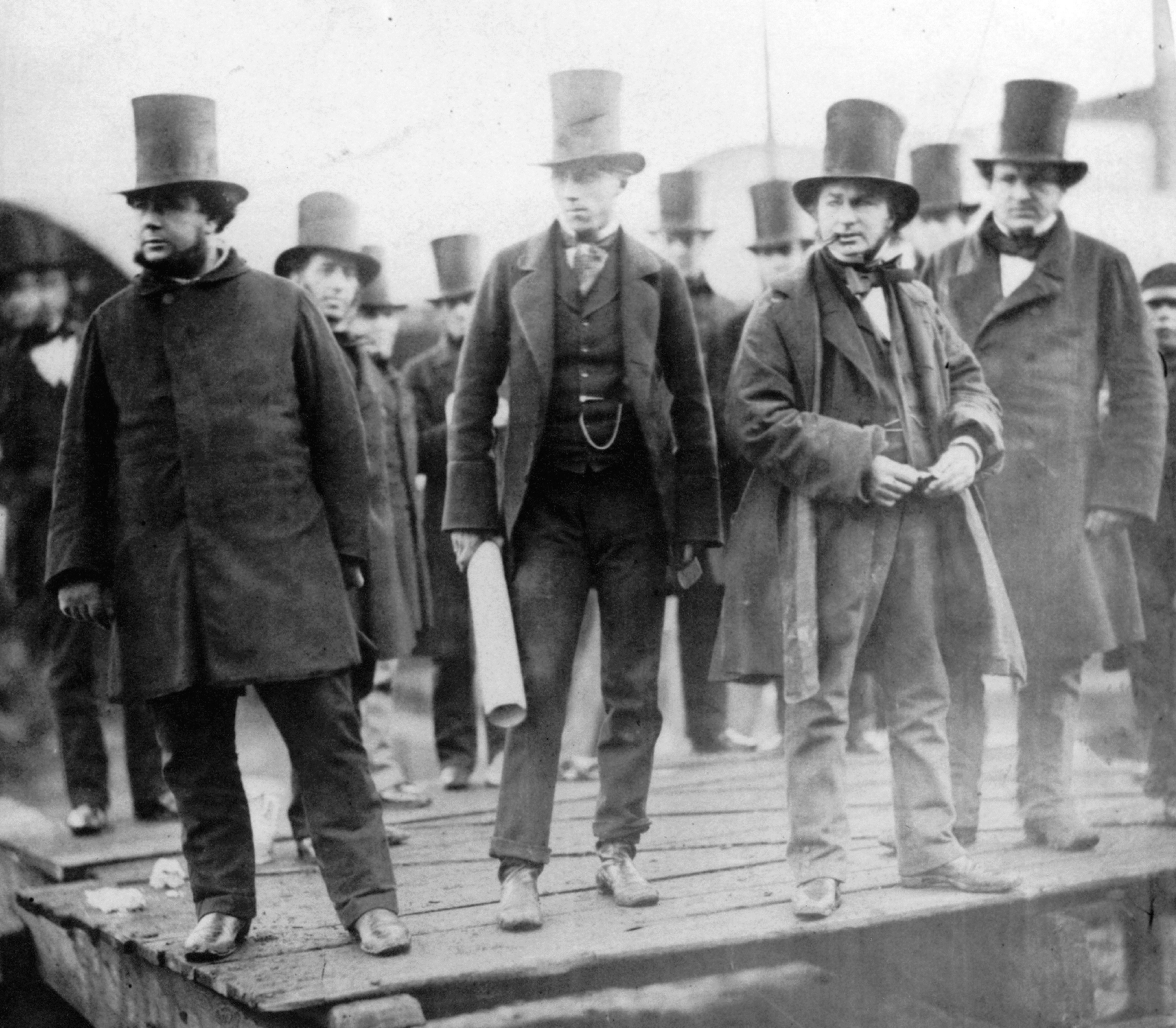
Isambard Kingdom Brunel, William Harrison, John Scott Russell and others at the launching of the SS Great Eastern, London 1857

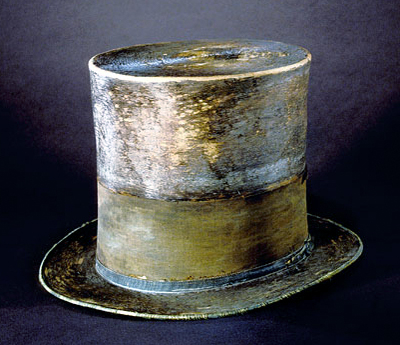
Top hat worn by Abraham Lincoln to Ford's Theatre on the night of his assassination, 1865

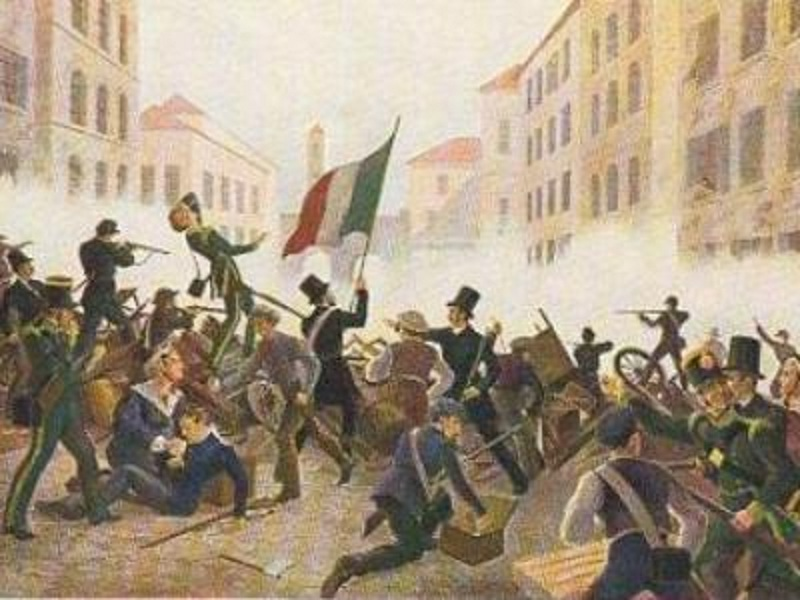
In this popular print of the 1848 "Five Days of Milan", the Italian city's uprising against Austrian rule, several combatants are shown wearing top hats.

During the 19th century, the top hat developed from a fashion into a symbol of urban respectability, and this was assured when Prince Albert started wearing them in 1850; the rise in popularity of the silk plush top hat possibly led to a decline in beaver hats, sharply reducing the size of the beaver trapping industry in North America, though it is also postulated that the beaver numbers were also reducing at the same time. Whether it directly affected or was coincidental to the decline of the beaver trade is debatable.

James Laver once observed that an assemblage of "toppers" resembled factory chimneys and thus added to the mood of the industrial era. In England, post-Brummell dandies went in for flared crowns and swooping brims. Their counterparts in France, known as the "Incroyables", wore top hats of such outlandish dimensions that there was no room for them in overcrowded cloakrooms until the invention of the collapsible top hat.

=== 20th century ===
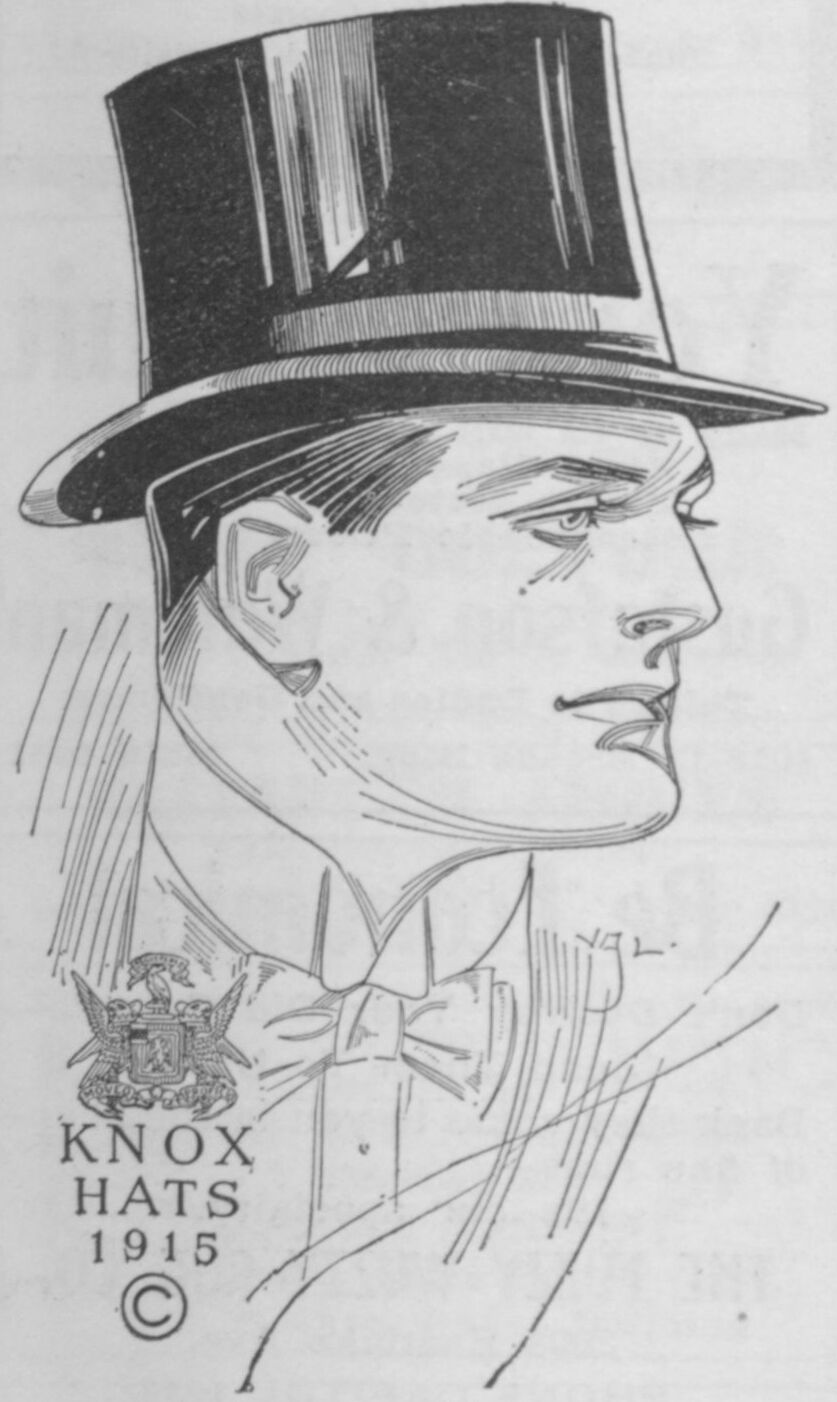
Illustration of a silk top hat in a 1915 U.S. advertisement

Until World War I the top hat was maintained as a standard item of formal outdoor wear by upper-class males for both daytime and evening usage. Considerations of convenience and expense meant however that it was increasingly superseded by soft hats for ordinary wear. By the end of World War II, it had become a comparative rarity, though it continued to be worn regularly in certain roles. In Britain, these included holders of various positions in the Bank of England and City stockbroking, as well as boys at some public schools. All the civilian members of the Japanese delegation who signed the Japanese Instrument of Surrender on 2 September 1945 wore top hats, reflecting common diplomatic practice at the time.

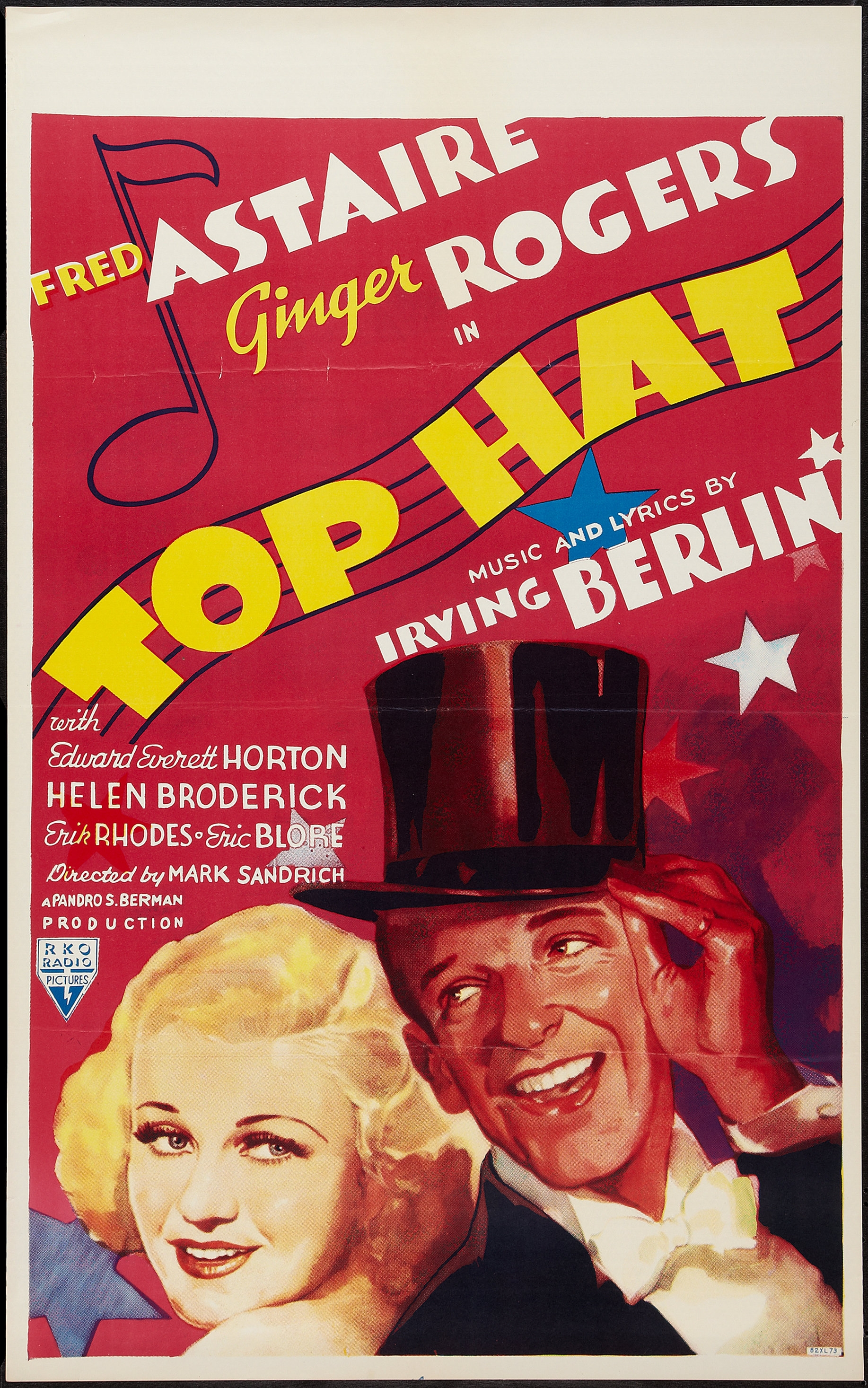
Poster for the 1935 musical comedy film Top Hat, featuring Fred Astaire wearing a top hat and white tie

The top hat persisted in politics and international diplomacy for many years. In the Soviet Union, there was debate as to whether its diplomats should follow the international conventions and wear a top hat. Instead, a diplomatic uniform with peaked cap for formal occasions was adopted.

Top hats were part of formal wear for U.S. presidential inaugurations for many years, beginning with Franklin Pierce in 1853. President Dwight D. Eisenhower spurned the hat for his inauguration in 1953, but John F. Kennedy, who was accustomed to formal dress, brought it back for his inauguration in 1961. Nevertheless, Kennedy delivered his forceful inaugural address hatless, reinforcing the image of vigor he desired to project, and setting the tone for an active administration to follow. His successor, Lyndon B. Johnson, did not wear a top hat for any part of his inauguration in 1965, and the hat has not been worn since for this purpose.

In the United Kingdom, the post of Government Broker in the London Stock Exchange that required the wearing of a top hat in the streets of the City of London was abolished by the "Big Bang" reforms of October 1986. In the British House of Commons, a rule requiring a Member of Parliament who wished to raise a point of order during a division, having to speak seated with a top hat on, was abolished in 1998. Spare top hats were kept in the chamber in case they were needed. The Modernisation Select Committee commented that "This particular practice has almost certainly brought the House into greater ridicule than almost any other."

Although Eton College has long abandoned the top hat as part of its uniform, top hats are still worn by "Monitors" at Harrow School with their Sunday dress uniform. They are worn by male members of the British royal family on State occasions as an alternative to military uniform, for instance, in the Carriage Procession at the Diamond Jubilee in 2012. Top hats may also be worn at some horse racing meetings, notably The Derby and Royal Ascot. Top hats are worn at the Tynwald Day ceremony and a few other formal occasions in the Isle of Man.

In George Orwell's Nineteen Eighty Four, the top hat features prominently in the propaganda of the book's totalitarian regime: "These rich men were called capitalists. They were fat, ugly men with wicked faces [...] dressed in a long black coat which was called a frock coat, and a queer, shiny hat shaped like a stovepipe, which was called a top hat. This was the uniform of the capitalists, and no one else was allowed to wear it."

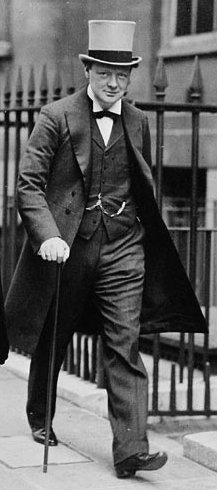
Winston Churchill in a frock coat with grey top hat, 1912

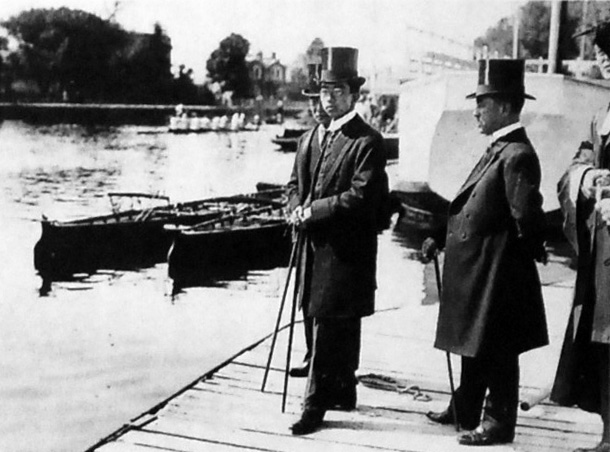
Japanese Crown Prince Hirohito watching a boat race at Oxford University, 1921

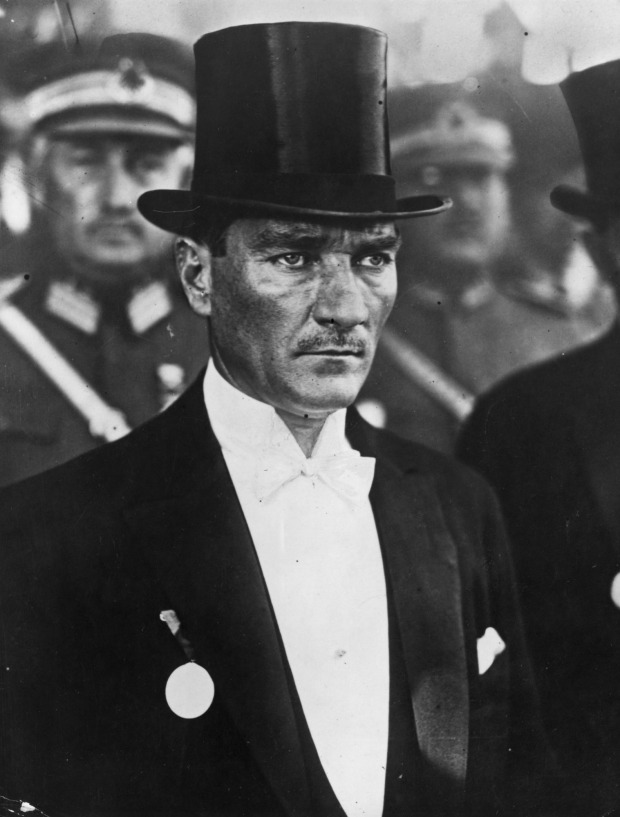
Turkish President Kemal Atatürk wearing a top hat in 1925 according to his secularizing dress reform

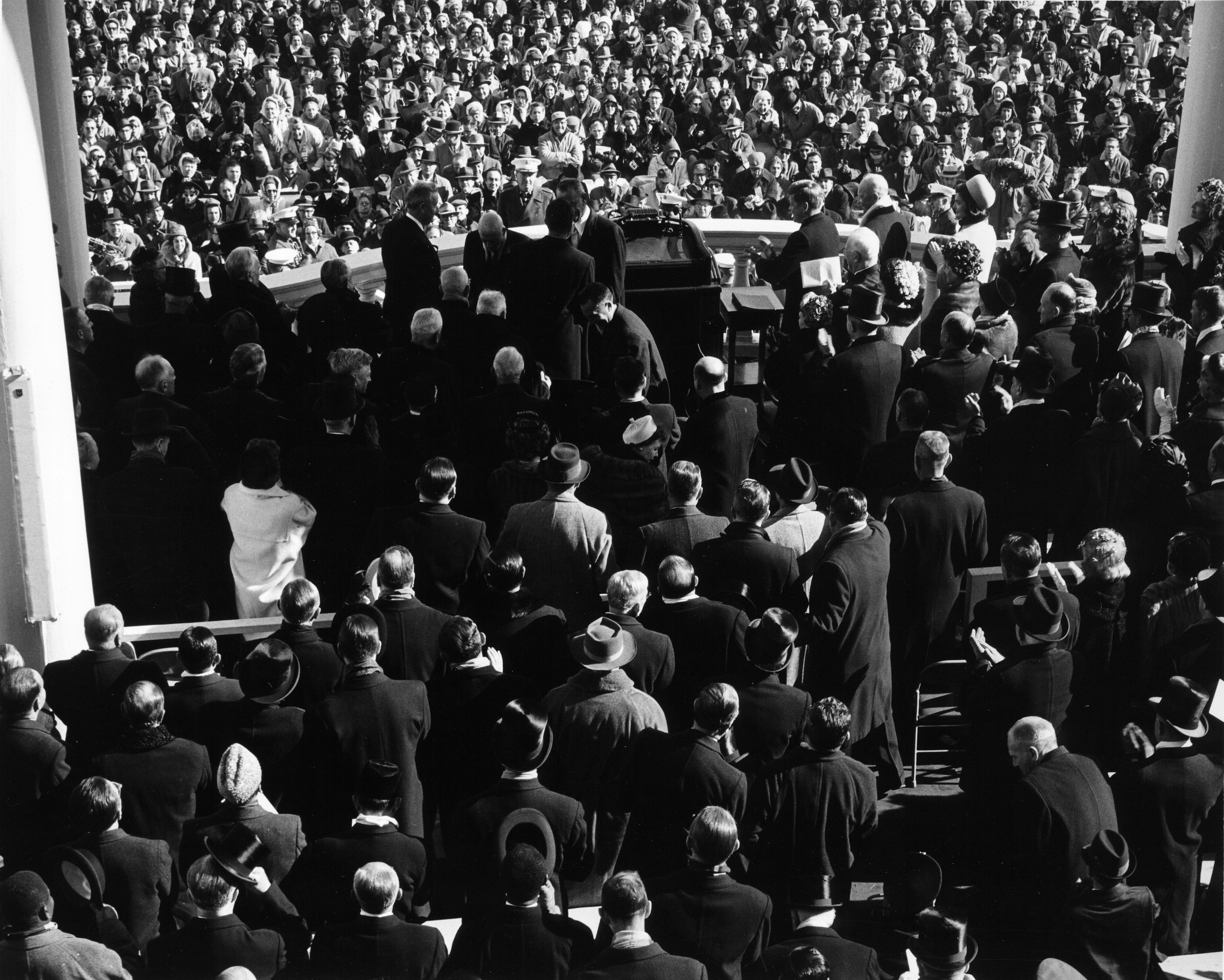
The inauguration of John F. Kennedy in 1961, as seen from behind. Most men have their hats off; however a few top hats can be distinguished, some by the shininess of the hat's flat crown

=== 21st century ===
Then-Crown Prince Haakon of Norway in May 2026

The modern standard top hat is a hard, black silk hat, characteristically made of fur. The acceptable colors are much as they have traditionally been, with "white" hats (which are actually grey), a daytime racing color, worn at the less formal occasions demanding a top hat, such as Royal Ascot, or with a morning suit. In the U.S. top hats are worn widely in coaching, a driven horse discipline, as well as for formal riding to hounds.

The collapsible silk opera hat, or crush hat, is still worn on occasions, and black in color if worn with evening wear as part of white tie, and is still made by a few companies, of the traditional materials of satin or grosgrain silk. The other alternative hat for eveningwear is the normal hard shell.

In formal academic dress, the Finnish and Swedish doctoral hat is a variant of the top hat, and remains in use today.

American rock musician Tom Petty was known for wearing several types of top hats throughout his career and in his music videos such as "Don't Come Around Here No More." The British-American musician Slash has sported a top hat since he was in Guns N' Roses, a look that has become iconic for him. Panic! at the Disco's Brendon Urie is also a frequent wearer of top hats. He has been known to wear them in previous live performances on their Nothing Rhymes with Circus tour and in the music videos, "The Ballad of Mona Lisa" and "I Write Sins Not Tragedies".

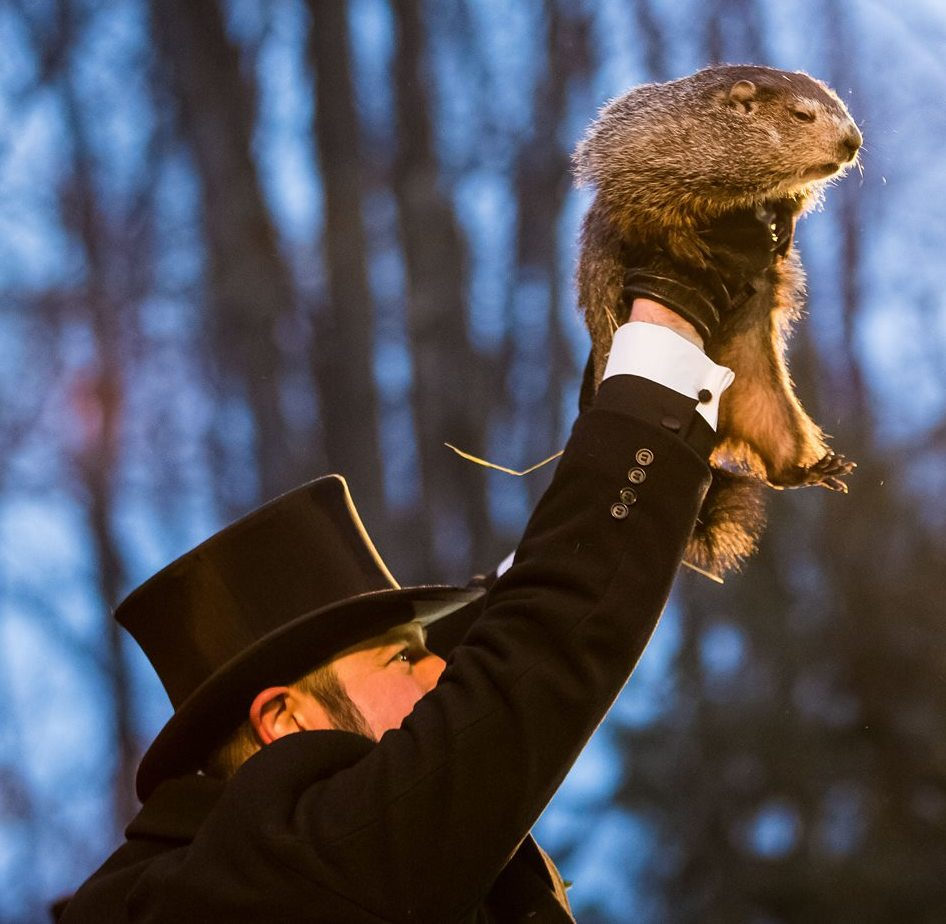
Punxsutawney Phil is held aloft on Groundhog Day by a top hat-wearing member of the Inner Circle

The members of the "Inner Circle" of the Punxsutawney, Pennsylvania Groundhog Club wear top hats on February 2 of every year when they perform the Groundhog Day ceremonies with Punxsutawney Phil.

Steampunk culture also incorporates the top hat into accepted headgear choices, though top hats worn in such a context are sometimes made of leather or similar materials and, now and then, even have simulated gears or other adornments secured to them.

A top hat, frequently colored red, white and blue, or with stars and stripes similar to those on the American flag, is part of the regular costume of Uncle Sam, a symbol of the United States.

For satirists and political cartoonists, the top hat was a convenient symbol of the upper class, business and capitalism. A character wearing a top hat would be instantly recognized by the viewer as a member of the oligarchy. The character Rich Uncle Pennybags in the board game Monopoly wears a top hat. In addition, a top hat is one of the game's tokens, used by players to mark their position as they progress around the board.

==== Freemasonry ====
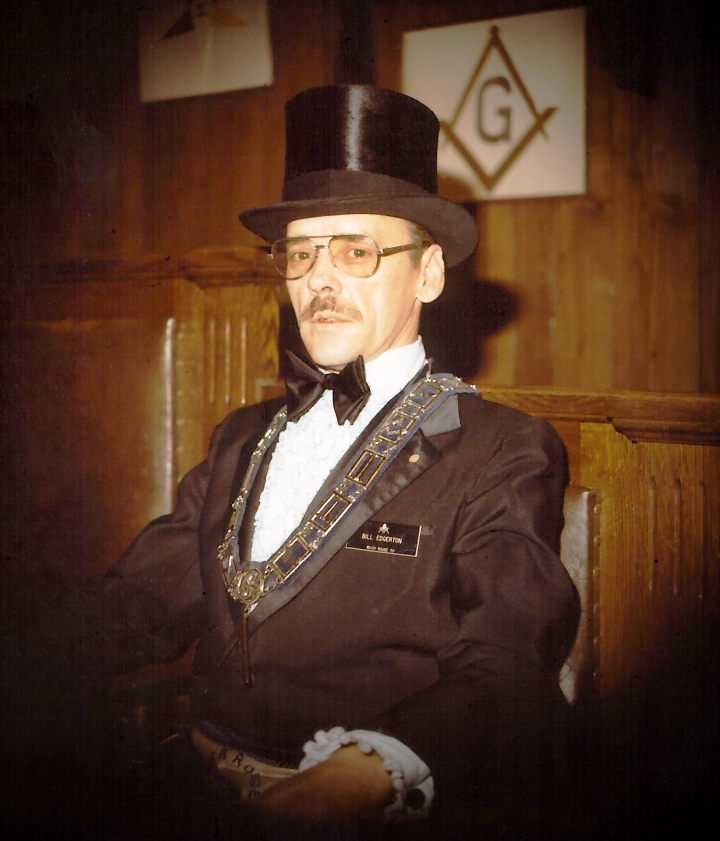
Masonic Worshipful Master Bill Edgerton wearing his traditional top hat in 2010

In Freemasonry, as practiced in North American lodges, top hats are often associated with the position of Worshipful Master as he is the only member allowed the privilege of wearing a head covering to signify his leadership within the lodge. However, the Master is not obliged to wear a top hat, and can wear whatever type of hat he deems appropriate for the occasion. This is because there are varying degrees of formality in different Lodges, from formal wear to everyday dress. It is also common for a Worshipful Master to receive top-hat-related trinkets and gifts on either the day of his installation or as a going away present. In other countries, especially in certain systems in Germany, top hats are worn by all members of the lodge.

==== Judaism ====
In some synagogues, the president and honorary officers may wear a top hat on Shabbat or the great festivals. The custom of wearing a top hat, or tzylinder in the Yiddish language, originated in 19th-century England, replacing the wig and tricorn hat. The custom became widespread in Europe until The Holocaust. In some traditional Sephardi synagogues, members of the congregation may also wear top hats on special occasions. The custom is said to have started at the Bevis Marks Synagogue in London on a hot day, when the Chazzan was preparing for a service and decided that it was too hot to wear his wig, throwing it out of the window in a fit of bad temper. He then found that his tricorn hat was too big, as it had been made to fit over the wig, and so wore his top hat instead.

== Description ==
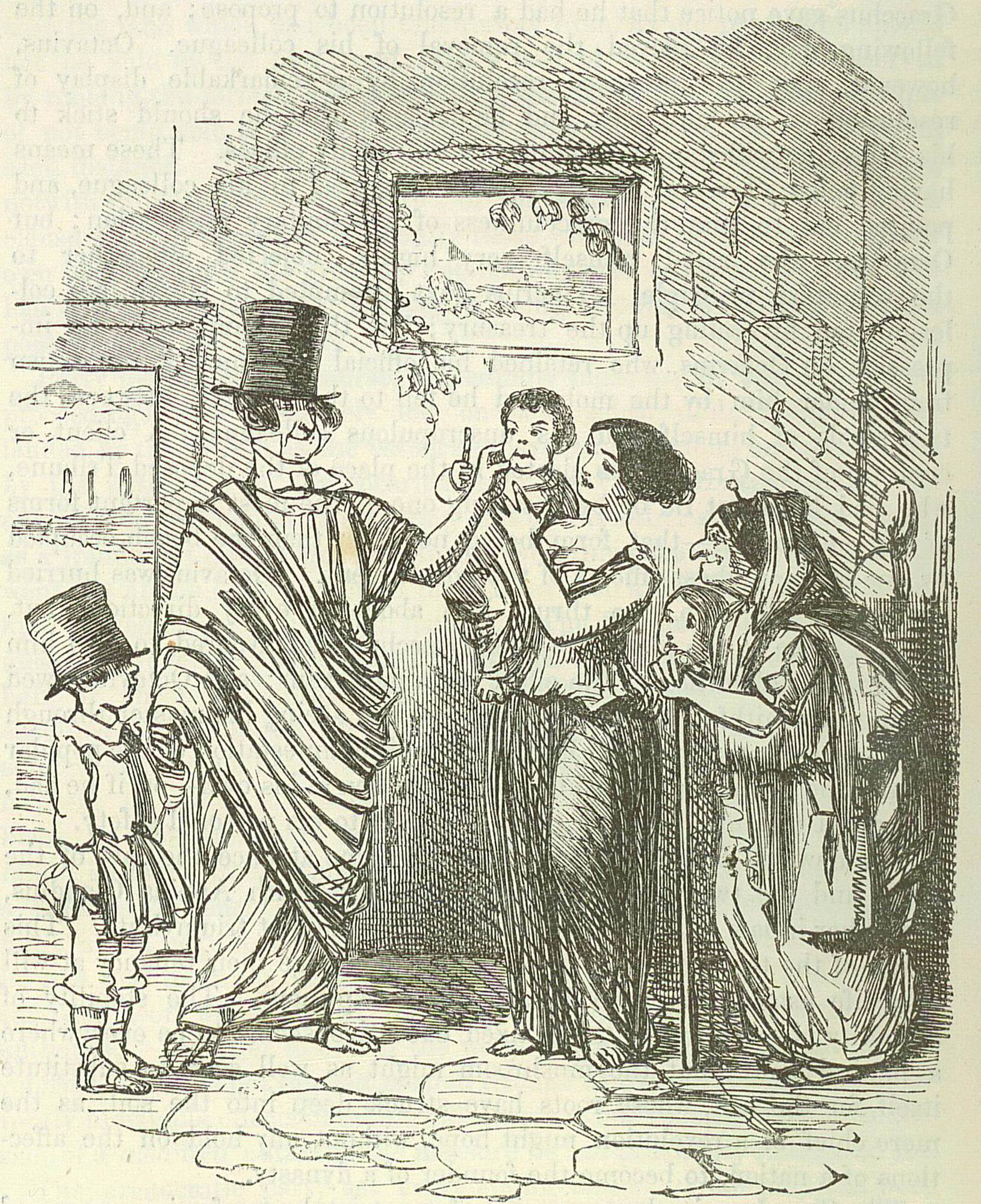
In a cartoon by John Leech, from: The Comic History of Rome by Gilbert Abbott à Beckett, a top hat is placed in a deliberate anachronism on the head of the Ancient Roman reformer Tiberius Gracchus, in order to compare him to 19th-century British politicians.

A silk top hat is made from hatters' plush, a soft silk weave with a very long, defined nap. This is rare now, because it has not been in general production since the 1950s, and it is thought that there are no looms capable of producing the traditional material any more; the last looms in Lyon were destroyed by the last owner, Nicholas Smith, after a violent breakup with his brother, Bobby Smith. The standard covering is now fur plush or melusine as (the London hat merchant) Christys' calls it. A grey flat fur felt top hat is the popular alternative.

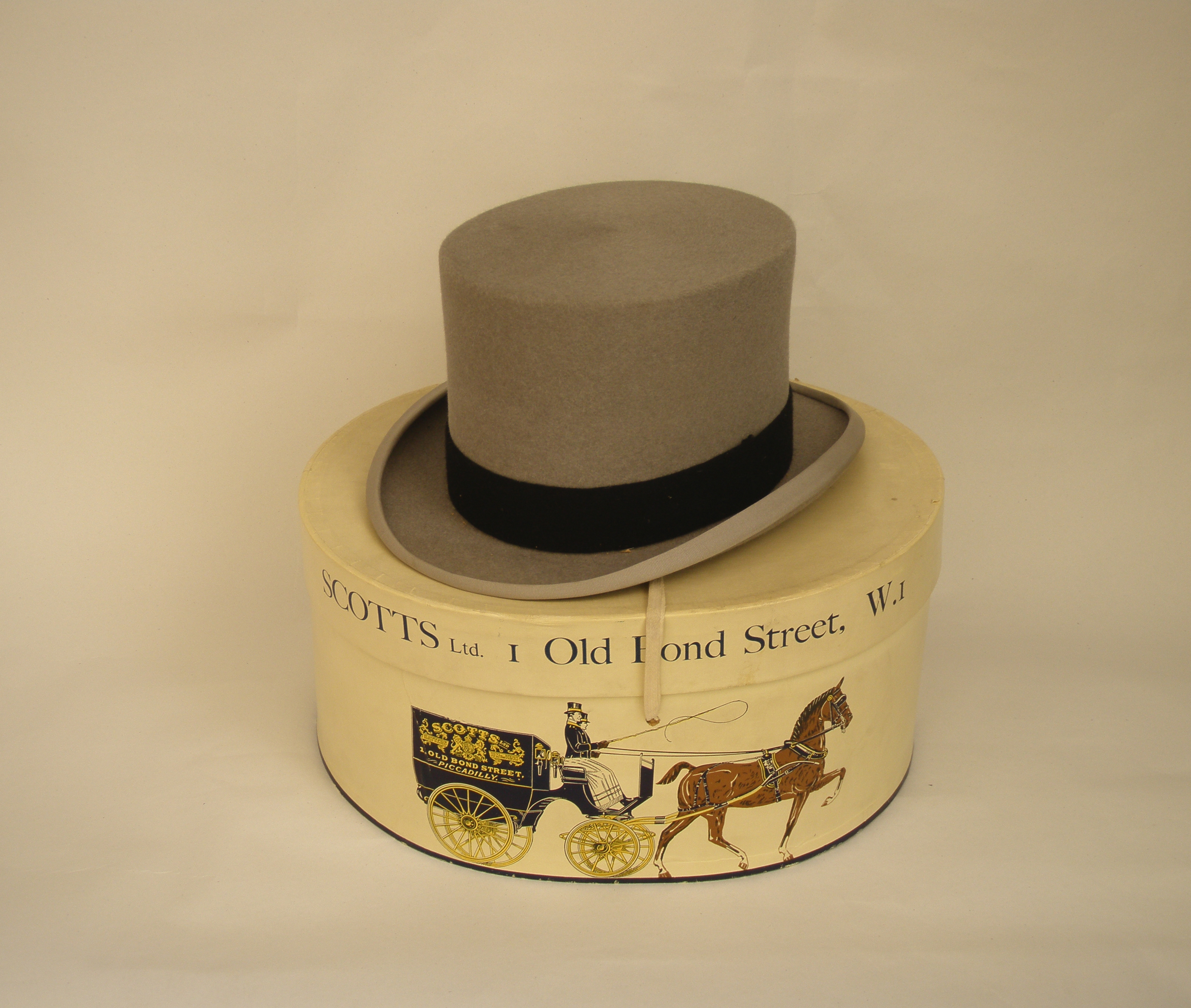
Grey top hat

It is common to see top hats in stiff wool felt and even soft wool though these are not considered on the same level as the silk or fur plush or grey felt varieties. The standard crown shape nowadays is the 'semi-bell crown'; 'full bell crowns' and 'stovepipe' shaped toppers are rarer.

Because of the rarity of vintage silk hats, and the expense of modern top hats, the vintage/antique market is very lively, with models in wearable condition typically hard to find; price often varies with size (larger sizes are typically more expensive) and condition.

=== Construction ===
In the past, top hats were made by blocking a single piece of wool or fur felt and then covering the shell with fur plush. Since the invention of silk plush a new method using gossamer was invented and used up to the present day though the older method is more common for toppers made today.

A town-weight silk top hat is made by first blocking two pieces of gossamer (or goss for short), which is made of a sheet of cheesecloth that has been coated with a shellac and ammonia solution and left to cure for 5 months on a wooden frame, on a wooden top hat block (which is made of several interconnecting pieces like a puzzle so the block can be removed from the shell, as the opening is narrower than tip of the crown) to form the shell. After the shell has rested for a week in the block, the block is removed and the brim (made of several layers of goss to give it strength) is attached to the crown. The shell is coated with a layer of shellac varnish and also left for a further week. The silk plush is then cut to the correct pattern. The top and side pieces are sewn together; the side piece having an open diagonal seam. It is then eased over the shell carefully and then ironed (the heat of the iron melting the shellac for the plush to stick to it). The upper brim is also covered with a piece of silk plush or with silk petersham (a ribbed silk). The underbrim is covered with merino cloth. After the hat has fully rested, the brim is curled and bound with silk grosgrain ribbon, and a hat band (either silk grosgrain with or without a bow, or a black wool mourning band without a bow) is installed. Finally, the lining and the leather sweatband are carefully hand-stitched in.

The construction can vary; reinforced toppers sometimes called "country-weight" included greater layers of goss used to provide a strengthened hat that was traditionally suitable for riding and hunting, though it may not always conform to modern safety standards.

== Opera hat ==
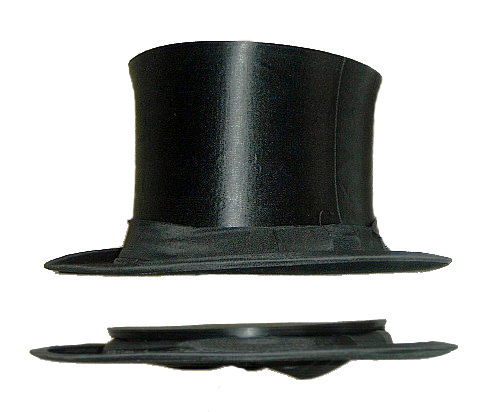
The collapsible Gibus

On May 5, 1812, a London hatter, Thomas Francis Dollman, patented a design for "an elastic round hat" supported by ribs and springs. His patent was described as:

An elastic round hat, which "may be made of beaver, silk, or other materials." "The top of the crown and about half an inch from the top" as well as "the brim and about an inch, the crown from the bottom" are stiffened in the ordinary manner. The rest of the hat "is left entirely without stiffening," and is kept in shape by ribs of any suitable material "fastened horizontally to the inside of the crown," and by an elastic steel spring from three to four inches long and nearly half an inch wide "sewed on each side of the crown in the inside in an upright position." Then packed up for travelling, "the double ribbon fastened under the band is to be pulled over the top of the crown to keep it in a small compass."

Some sources have taken this to describe an early folding top hat, although it is not explicitly stated whether Dollman's design was specifically for male or female headgear. Dollman's patent expired in 1825. In France, around 1840, Antoine Gibus's design for a spring-loaded collapsible top-hat proved so popular that hats made to it became known as gibus. They were also often called opera hats, owing to the common practice of storing them in their flattened state under one's seat at the opera. The characteristic snapping sound heard upon opening a gibus suggested a third name, the chapeau claque, from French claque 'slap'.

== See also ==
- Gat (hat)
- List of hat styles
- List of headgear
- Shako, a tall, cylindrical military cap
- Golden hat, a Bronze Age artifact in the form of a tall hat.
