= Abbott's Get Together =

Abbott's Get Together is a long-running annual convention for magicians held in Colon, Michigan, United States. It was founded in 1934 by Percy Abbott and his business partner, Recil Bordner. The Get Together is well known within the magician industry as an event to gather and share information with their peers. There are routinely multiple stage shows, a close-up magic gala, lectures, contests, and a dealer's room. The 88th Abbott's Magic Get-Together takes place on August 5–8, 2026.

The event was cancelled in 2020 due to the COVID-19 pandemic, but resumed in 2021.

== History of the Get-Together ==
=== Abbott Magic Company ===
Percy Abbott, an Australian-born magician who owned several magic supply companies in Australia in the early 1900s, co-founded the Blackstone Magic Company in Colon, Michigan, with Harry Blackstone Sr. in 1927. Eighteen months later, the two parted ways. In 1934, Abbott reopened the business as the Abbott Magic Company with a new partner, Recil Bordner, and in an attempt to boost poor sales, they decided to hold an open house. Eighty magicians from the area of Michigan, Indiana, and Ohio came to watch as Bordner performed with other magicians while Abbott was the emcee. This event was closed to the public, but boosted sales so much that another event was held the following year to even more success. In 1937, it was opened to the public and moved to Colon High School's gymnasium.

== See also ==
- Magic convention
- Martinka (company)
