= Percy Abbott (magician) =

Australian magician and magic dealer

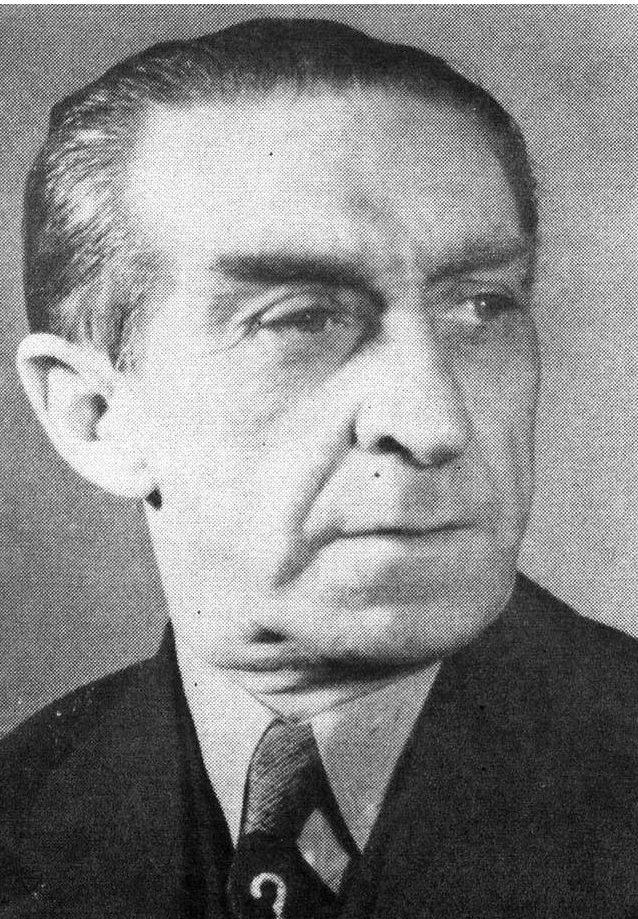
- Born: May 3, 1886; Braidwood, Australia
- Died: August 26, 1960 (aged 74); Colon, Michigan
- Known for: Abbott Magic & Novelty Co.

Percy Abbott (May 3, 1886 – August 26, 1960) was an Australian magician and magic dealer who founded Abbott's Magic Novelty Company in Colon, Michigan. Abbott's business was once the largest manufacturer and retailer of magic tricks and stage illusions in the world.

== Biography ==
Abbott was born in Braidwood, Australia on May 3, 1886 as one of four children. Orphaned as a youngster, Abbott and his siblings moved in with an aunt who charged the children for room and board.

His early interests included theater and magic. He took part in amateur theatrical productions as a boy. He discovered magic which he would devote most of his life along with its allied art, ventriloquism. In his early 1920s, Abbott found himself performing regularly in Sydney and other Australian towns, eventually taking a position with a firm that supplied magicians with the tricks of their trade, the New York Novelty Co. Abbott would eventually open his own supply house for conjurers, called the Abbott's Magic Novelty Co., on Pitt St. in downtown Sydney. He continued performing and was reportedly one of the first magicians to perform the Sawing a woman in half illusion in Australia.

Abbott turned the reins of his magic shop over to his brother Frank to leave Australia permanently. He toured the Orient and eventually landed in America, where in 1926 attended the first annual convention of the International Brotherhood of Magicians.

Abbott met Harry Blackstone Sr. and the two men agreed to form a partnership to establish the "Blackstone Magic Co." in the small village of Colon, Michigan in 1928, but the company only lasted for 18 months. Four years later, after working on Coney Island with Jean Hugard, playing school shows throughout the Midwest, and getting married, Abbott opened another magic shop in Colon, Michigan, "The Abbott Magic Novelty Company" and began advertising in trade journals in 1933. Recil Bordner, a magic enthusiast and son of successful farmers from Edon, Ohio, joined the firm as a partner in 1934.

The shop moved into larger premises in Colon, at 124 St. Joseph St., and celebrated the event by hosting the first annual Abbott Magic Get-Together that fall. The event became an annual tradition that continues to this day. He also founded the Abbott Magic Co.'s magazine called "Tops", in January 1936, editing it for several years before turning it over to the Abbott company's staff artist, Howard Melson.

By the end of 1945, Percy Abbott's business was spread over seven buildings and employed over 54 workers with Abbott branch stores established in Detroit, Indianapolis, New York, Los Angeles, and Chicago. Abbott's issued the largest magic catalog of all time, some 832 pages long, and featuring over 1800 different products, most manufactured at the Abbott factories.

Abbott maintained an active interest in the magic business until his retirement in 1959. At that time, he sold his share of the company to longtime partner Bordner.

In 1959 Abbott wrote his memoir, "A Lifetime in Magic" which was published just months before he died, on August 26, 1960, from a heart attack at the age of 74. Percy Abbott's life, including personal details of his years in Australia, is subject of website

== Bibliography ==
=== Books ===
==== Written or contributed to ====
- Percy Abbott: Magical Years, Biography of Percy Abbott Written by Rick Fisher (2016)
- Abbott's Magic for Magicians, Secrets of Occidental and Oriental Magic (1934).
- Abbott's Practical Patter (1935)
- Comedy Magic (Abbott) (1937)
- A Lifetime in Magic (1960)
- Abbott's Encyclopedia of Rope Tricks, Vol. 1 (1941) compiled by Stewart James
- Rice's Encyclopedia of Silks, Vol. 1, (1948) by Harold Rice
- Abbott's Cigarette Magic compiled by Tom Zeno (1936)

==== Published ====
- Hat Loading Methods, compiled by U. F. Grant and Stewart James (1941)
- Illusions! Illusions! (n.d.)
