= Capotain =

Tall, conical hat of the 16th–17th centuries

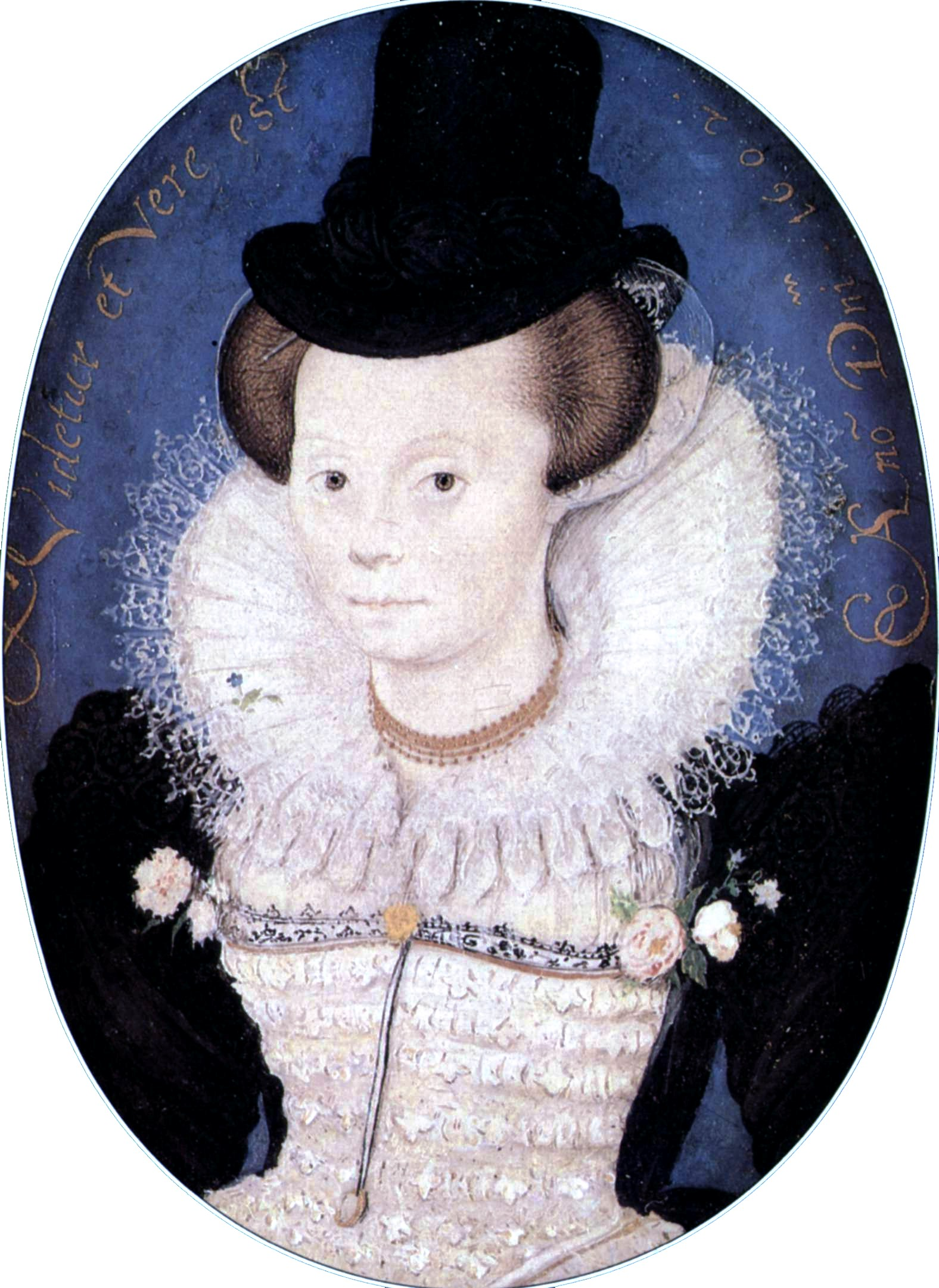
Woman in a Capotain by Nicholas Hilliard, 1602

A capotain, capatain, copotain, copintank or steeple hat is a tall-crowned, narrow-brimmed, slightly conical "sugarloaf" hat, usually black, worn by men and women from the 1590s into the mid-seventeenth century in England and northwestern Europe. Earlier capotains had rounded crowns; later, the crown was flat at the top.

The capotain is especially associated with Puritan costume in England in the years leading up to the English Civil War and during the years of the Commonwealth. It is also commonly called a flat-topped hat and a Pilgrim hat, the latter for its association with the Pilgrims who settled Plymouth Colony in the 1620s. Contrary to popular myth, capotains never included buckles on the front of them; this image was created in the 19th century.

It has been theorised that the capotain inspired the top hat.

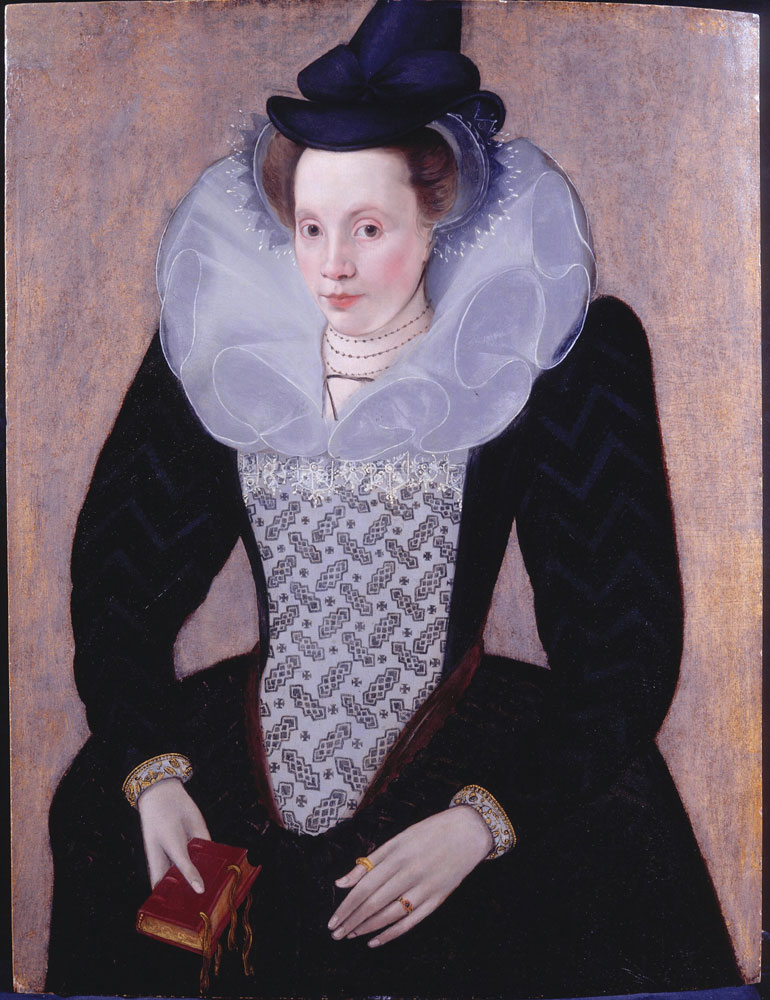
England, 1592
(Portrait of an Unknown Lady, attributed to Robert Peake the Elder)

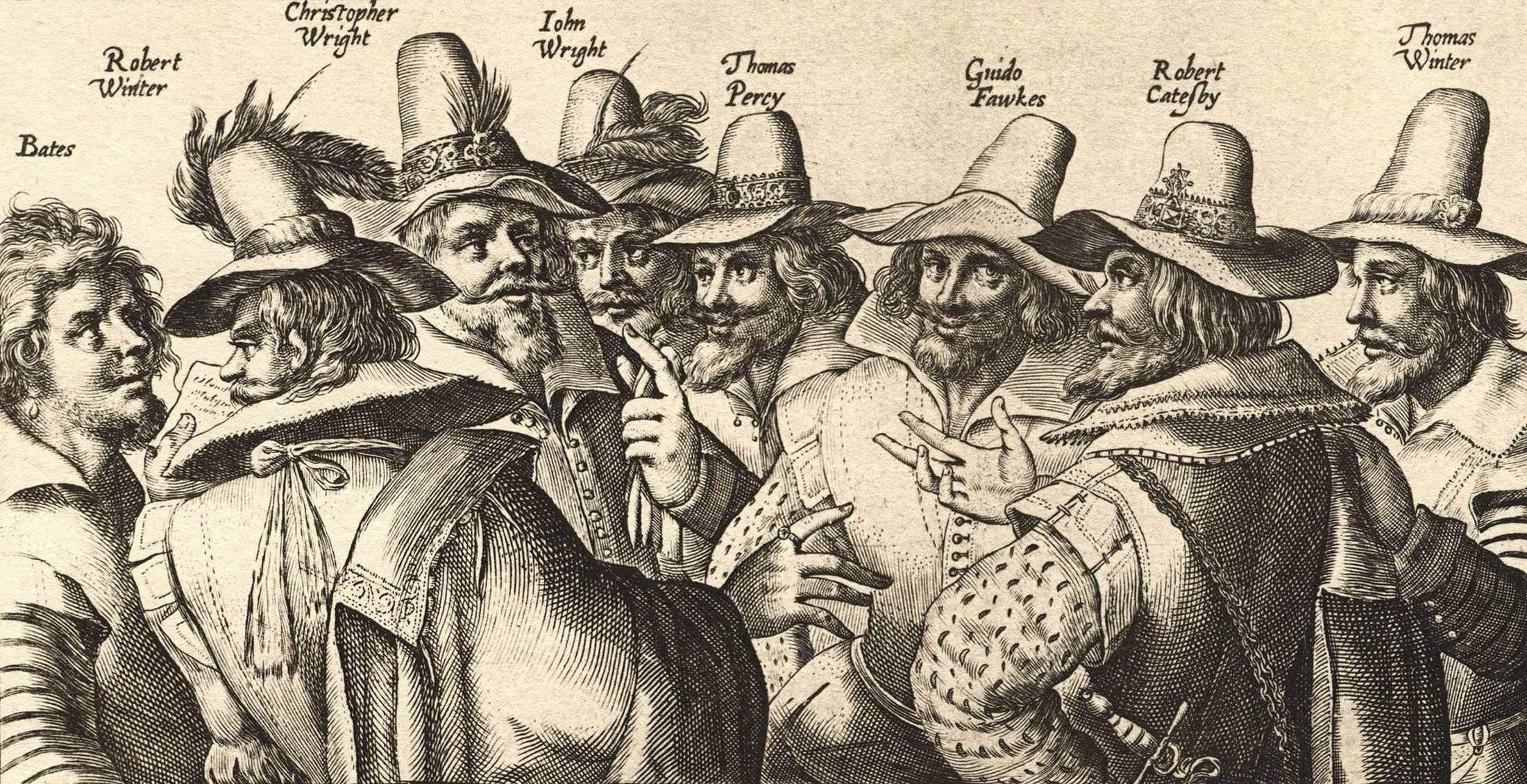
England, 1600s
(Detail from an engraving of the Gunpowder Plotters)

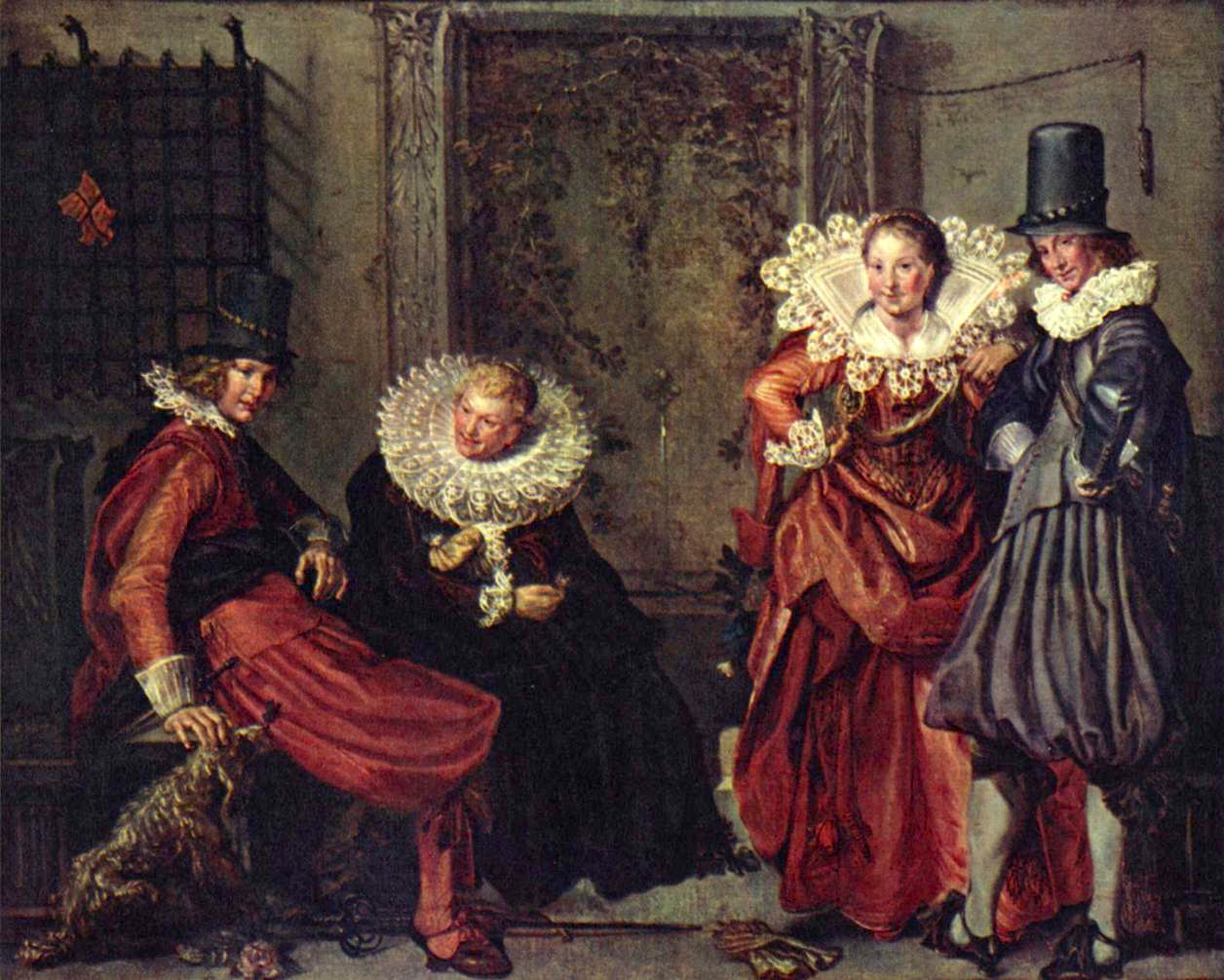
Holland, 1615 (Elegant Couples Courting by Willem Pieterszoon Buytewech)

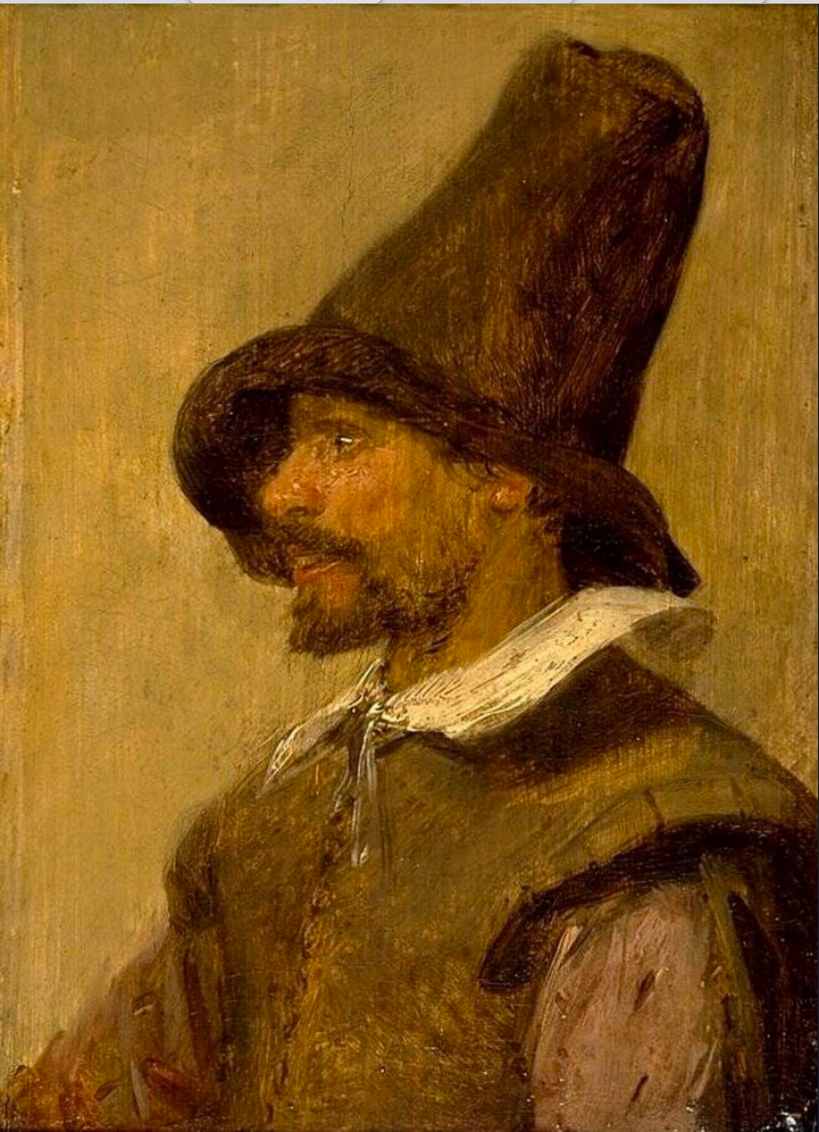
Flanders, 1630s
(Man with a Hat painting by Adriaen Brouwer)

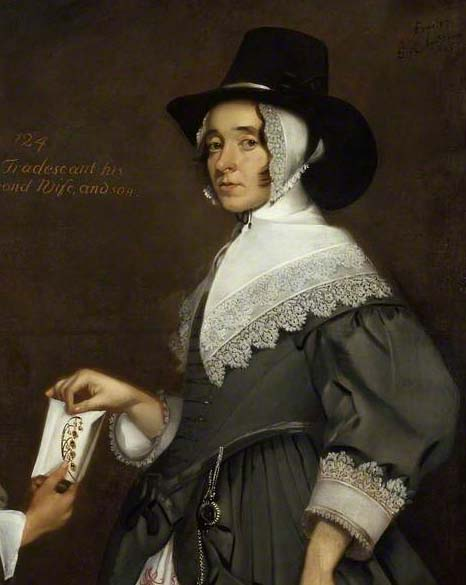
England, 1640s
(Ester Tradescant and Son, attributed to Thomas de Critz)

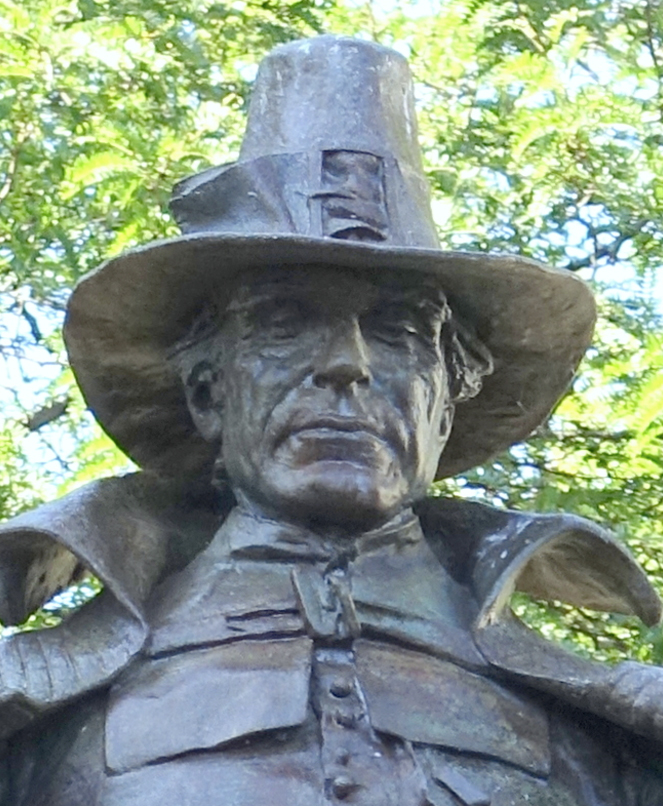
A spurious buckled capotain, as carved by Augustus St. Gaudens on The Puritan and The Pilgrim, 1887

== See also ==
- 1550–1600 in fashion
- 1600–1650 in fashion
- 1650–1700 in fashion
- List of hat styles
- List of headgear
- Toque
- Pilgrim's hat
