= Gay Blackstone =

American magician and producer

- Born: Arla Gay Blevins; March 27, 1952 (age 74)
- Occupations: Magician; television producer; stage producer; director; consultant; lecturer; author
- Spouse: Harry Blackstone Jr. (m. 1974; died 1997)
- Children: 4, including Bellamie Blackstone
- Relatives: Harry Blackstone Sr. (father-in-law)
- Website: www.blackstonemagic.com

Arla Gay Blevins (born March 27, 1952), known professionally as Gay Blackstone, is an American television and stage producer, director, consultant, lecturer and author. She was president of the Academy of Magical Arts and was named one of "2007 Hollywood's Women of Distinction" by the Hollywood Chamber of Commerce. She is also the international ambassador of the International Brotherhood of Magicians. Blackstone was the executive producer for the 2013 revival of the television show Masters of Illusion.

The second wife of Harry Blackstone Jr., she was married to him for 23 years. Her daughter, Bellamie Blackstone, is a television producer.
