= Colon High School =

High school in Michigan, United States

Coordinates: 41°57′35.3″N 85°19′1.5″W

Location
- 400 Dallas Street; Colon, (St. Joseph County), Michigan 49042; United States

Information
- Type: Public high school
- Principal: Jenny J. Wielenga
- Staff: 14.10 (FTE)
- Enrollment: 271 (2023-2024)
- Student to teacher ratio: 19.22
- Colors: Red and white
- Athletics conference: Southern Central Athletic Association
- Nickname: Magi
- Website: https://www.colonschools.org/

Colon High School is a public high school in northeastern St. Joseph County, Michigan. It serves the residents of Colon and the surrounding community including Leonidas Township and other rural areas. Its high school mascot is Magi, a rabbit (sometimes depicted as a rabbit in a hat). Colon chose this mascot because Colon, Michigan, is the "magic capital of the world". Every year, Colon hosts "Magic Week" where many performers put on displays, skits, and magic tricks for the town and surrounding areas.

Colon High School won the MHSAA Division 1 state championship in eight-man football in 2019.
