= Colon, Michigan =

- Village
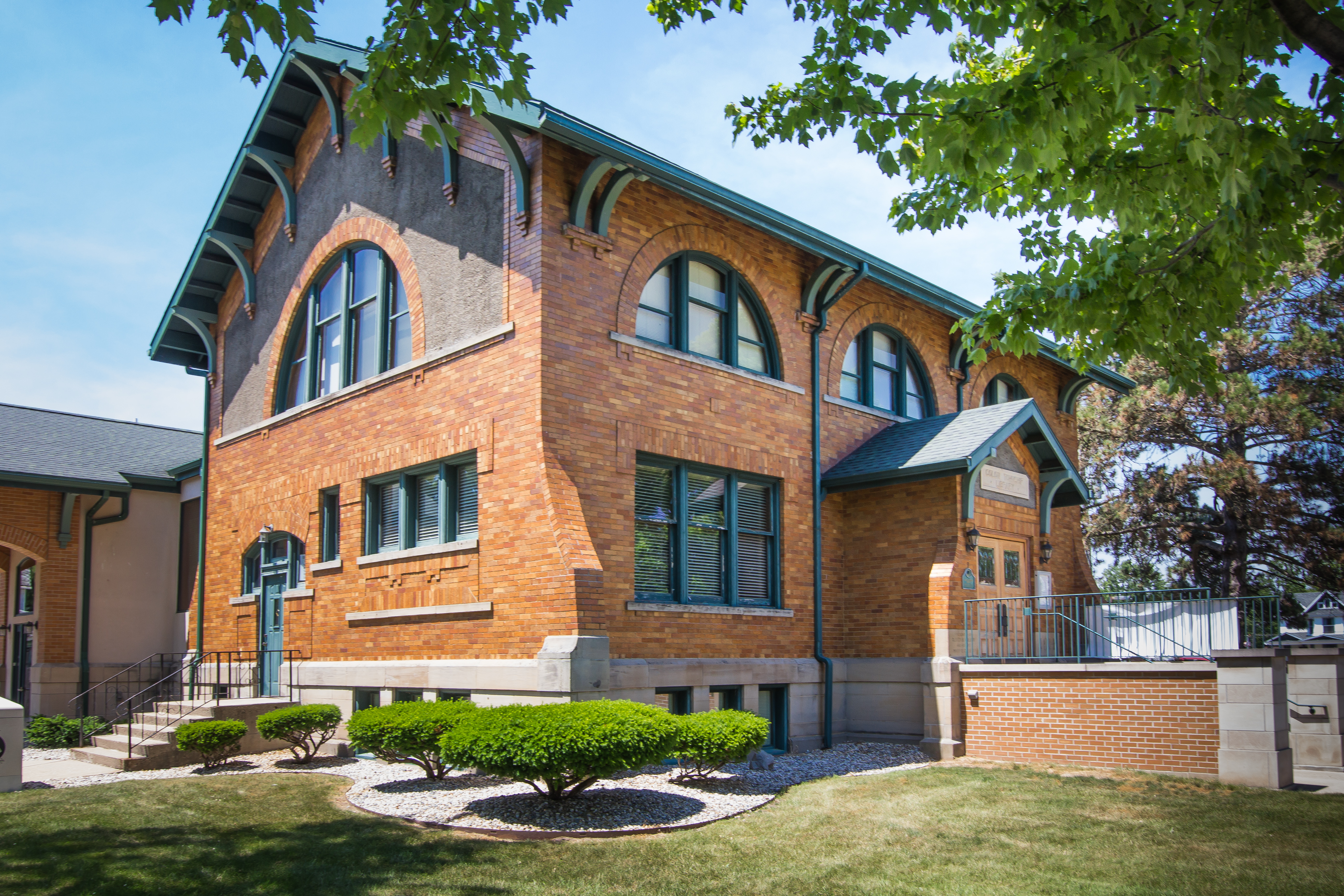
- Colon Public Library
- Motto: "Magic Capital of the World"
- Location of Colon, Michigan within St. Joseph County
- Coordinates: 41°57′21″N 85°19′21″W
- Country: United States
- State: Michigan
- County: St. Joseph

Area
  - Total: 1.74 sq mi (4.50 km^{2})
  - Land: 1.37 sq mi (3.56 km^{2})
  - Water: 0.37 sq mi (0.95 km^{2})
- Elevation: 863 ft (263 m)

Population (2020)
  - Total: 1,199
  - Density: 872.9/sq mi (337.04/km^{2})
- Time zone: UTC-5 (Eastern (EST))
  - Summer (DST): UTC-4 (EDT)
- FIPS code: 26-17360
- GNIS feature ID: 1624462
- Website: Village website

Colon is a village in St. Joseph County in the U.S. state of Michigan. The population was 1,199 at the 2020 census. The village is located within Colon Township. It is known as "The Magic Capital of the World", as it is the home of the Abbott Magic Company, the site of the annual Abbott's Magic Get-Together, and the former home and burial site of the famed stage magician Harry Blackstone, Sr.

== History ==
Colon was platted in 1844. It was incorporated as a village in 1904.

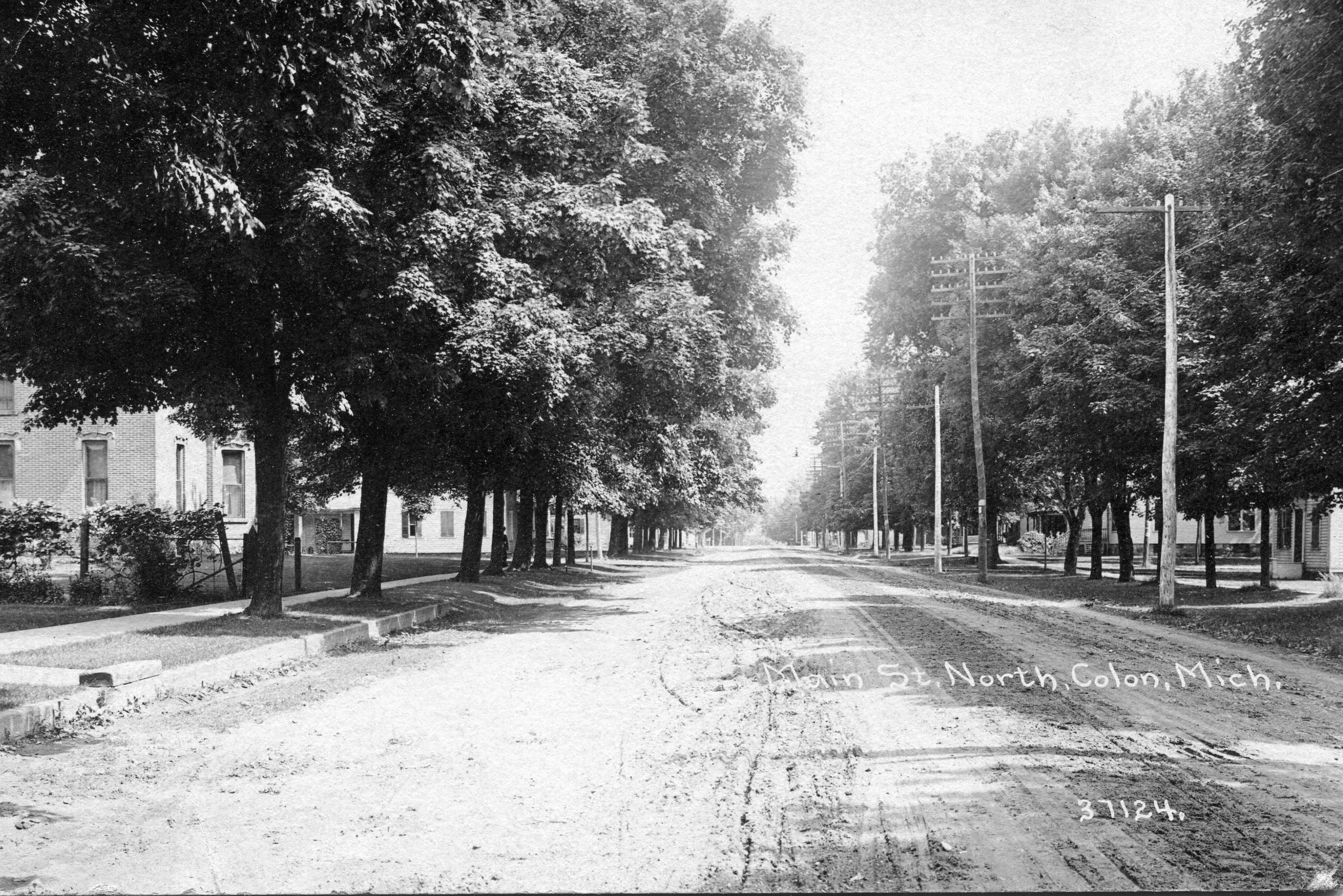
Main St., North, Colon, MI

== Geography ==
According to the United States Census Bureau, the village has a total area of 1.73 square miles (4.48 km^{2}), of which 1.37 square miles (3.55 km^{2}) is land and 0.36 square miles (0.93 km^{2}) is water. The town is flanked by Sturgeon Lake and Palmer Lake, which are connected by a narrow channel. Additionally, the St. Joseph River is located nearby.

== Demographics ==
Historical population
| Census | Pop. | Note | %± |
|---|---|---|---|
| 1860 | 311 | | — |
| 1870 | 398 | | 28.0% |
| 1880 | 422 | | 6.0% |
| 1890 | 489 | | 15.9% |
| 1910 | 853 | | — |
| 1920 | 745 | | −12.7% |
| 1930 | 781 | | 4.8% |
| 1940 | 896 | | 14.7% |
| 1950 | 1,000 | | 11.6% |
| 1960 | 1,055 | | 5.5% |
| 1970 | 1,172 | | 11.1% |
| 1980 | 1,190 | | 1.5% |
| 1990 | 1,224 | | 2.9% |
| 2000 | 1,227 | | 0.2% |
| 2010 | 1,173 | | −4.4% |
| 2020 | 1,199 | | 2.2% |
U.S. Decennial Census

=== 2010 census ===
As of the census of 2010, there were 1,173 people, 485 households, and 299 families living in the village. The population density was 856.2 inhabitants per square mile (330.6/km^{2}). There were 650 housing units at an average density of 474.5 per square mile (183.2/km^{2}). The racial makeup of the village was 97.3% White, 0.3% African American, 0.3% Native American, 0.2% Asian, 0.1% from other races, and 1.8% from two or more races. Hispanic or Latino of any race were 1.3% of the population.

There were 485 households, of which 31.5% had children under the age of 18 living with them, 47.0% were married couples living together, 10.9% had a female householder with no husband present, 3.7% had a male householder with no wife present, and 38.4% were non-families. 32.0% of all households were made up of individuals, and 14.8% had someone living alone who was 65 years of age or older. The average household size was 2.42 and the average family size was 3.04.

The median age in the village was 39.7 years. 23.9% of residents were under the age of 18; 10.6% were between the ages of 18 and 24; 21.6% were from 25 to 44; 27.1% were from 45 to 64; and 16.7% were 65 years of age or older. The gender makeup of the village was 48.2% male and 51.8% female.

=== 2000 census ===
As of the census of 2000, there were 1,227 people, 521 households, and 339 families living in the village. The population density was 882.0 inhabitants per square mile (340.5/km^{2}). There were 639 housing units at an average density of 459.3 per square mile (177.3/km^{2}). The racial makeup of the village was 97.96% White, 0.16% African American, 0.08% Native American, 0.41% Asian, 0.16% from other races, and 1.22% from two or more races. Hispanic or Latino of any race were 0.90% of the population.

There were 521 households, out of which 30.7% had children under the age of 18 living with them, 47.6% were married couples living together, 13.1% had a female householder with no husband present, and 34.9% were non-families. 30.7% of all households were made up of individuals, and 16.5% had someone living alone who was 65 years of age or older. The average household size was 2.36 and the average family size was 2.91.

In the village, the population was spread out, with 27.4% under the age of 18, 7.3% from 18 to 24, 24.0% from 25 to 44, 23.5% from 45 to 64, and 17.8% who were 65 years of age or older. The median age was 38 years. For every 100 females, there were 90.5 males. For every 100 females age 18 and over, there were 87.2 males.

The median income for a household in the village was $29,417, and the median income for a family was $35,536. Males had a median income of $33,056 versus $21,375 for females. The per capita income for the village was $14,502. About 12.5% of families and 15.1% of the population were below the poverty line, including 19.6% of those under age 18 and 8.9% of those age 65 or over.

== People and culture ==
Colon is the former home and burial site of several famous magicians including, Harry Blackstone, Sr. (The Great Blackstone). The United States Congress recognizes Colon as "The Magic Capital of the World". It is the home of the Abbott Magic Company, founded in 1934 by magicians Percy Abbott, an Australian and friend of Blackstone's, and Recil Bordner, originally from Eaton, Ohio. The company has a local store, showroom, and a factory where magicians' supplies and new tricks are manufactured. Abbott Magic is well known among professional stage acts, with customers around the world. FAB Magic Company and the Sterlini Magic Manufacturing Company are also based in Colon. Weekly magic shows are performed during the summer at the Abbott Magic Company. Each August, more than 1,000 magicians and lovers of magic gather in Colon for "Abbott's Magic Get-Together", a 4-day magic convention, doubling the local population, to share magic tricks and recount their knowledge of the famous occupation. The convention concludes each day with an evening show at Colon High School.

The Colon High School teams are known as the "Magi", and the high school mascot is a white rabbit wearing a black top hat. Also, a few of the local shops exploit the "magic" theme in their titles.

Colon also has a small Amish farming community.

== Notable people ==
- Ima Winchell Stacy (1867-1923); American educator

== See also ==
- American Museum of Magic
