= Harry Blackstone Jr. =

American magician (1934–1997)

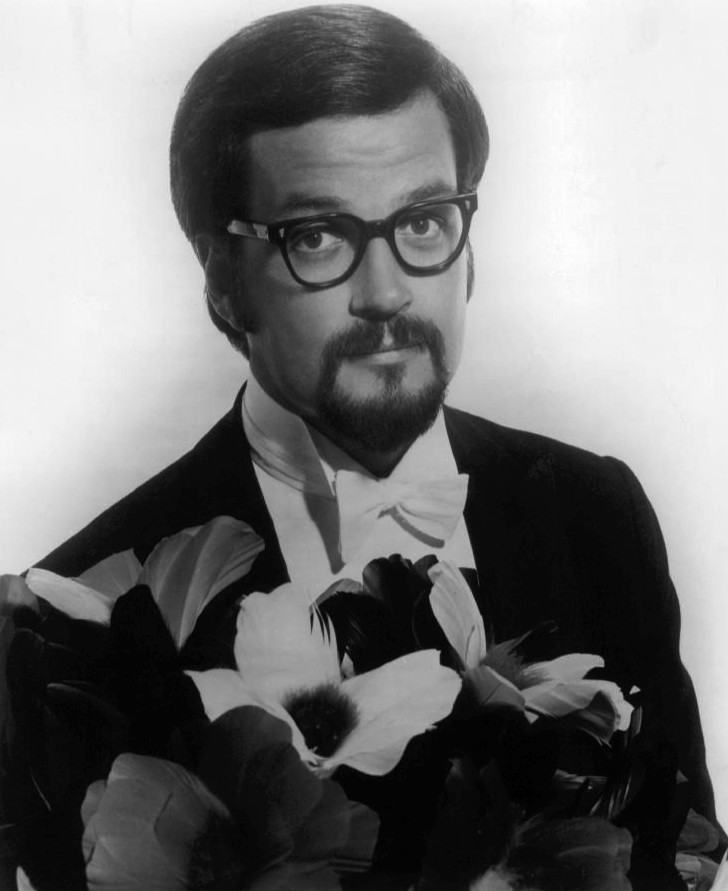
- Blackstone in 1976
- Born: Harry Bouton Blackstone Jr. June 30, 1934; Three Rivers, Michigan, U.S.
- Died: May 14, 1997 (aged 62); Loma Linda, California, U.S.
- Occupations: Stage magician, author, performer
- Spouse: Gay Blackstone (m. 1974)
- Children: 4, including Bellamie Blackstone
- Father: Harry Blackstone Sr.

Harry Bouton Blackstone Jr. (June 30, 1934 – May 14, 1997) was an American stage magician, author, and television performer. He is estimated to have pulled 80,000 rabbits from his sleeves and hats.

== Early life ==
Blackstone was born in Three Rivers, Michigan and was the son of noted stage magician Harry Blackstone Sr. (also known as the Great Blackstone). As an infant, he was used as a prop in his father's act.

== Career ==
In his performances, Blackstone used several of his father's tricks and illusions, including the "floating light bulb", "sawing a woman in half", and the "dancing handkerchief". His wife, Gay Blackstone, was his magician's assistant, keeping his performances running smoothly onstage and offstage.

Blackstone created four levels (beginner to advanced) of magic kits that were the best selling in the field. In the early 1970s, he promoted a "PF Magic Wedge Kit" on a television commercial for PF Flyers sneakers, and he appeared on several commercials for Jiffy Pop popcorn.

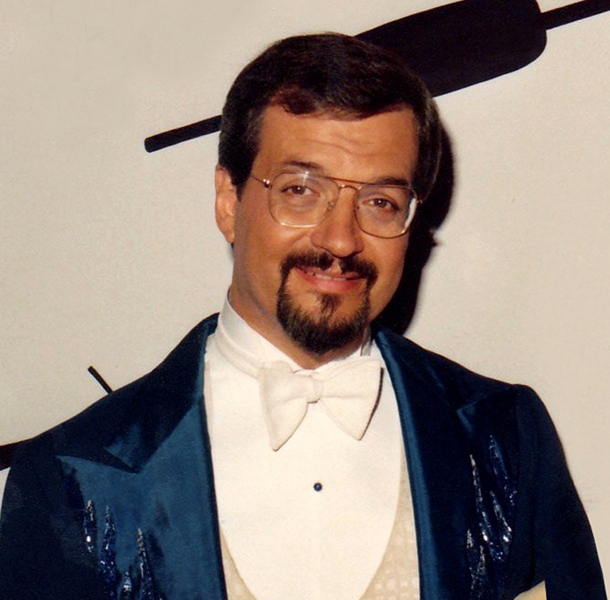
Harry Blackstone Jr., Pittsburgh, 1981

In 1985, on the 100th anniversary of his father's birth, Blackstone donated to the Smithsonian Institution in Washington, D.C. the original floating light bulb – designed and built by Thomas Edison – and the original Casadega Cabinet, used in the "Dancing Handkerchief" illusion. This was the first donation accepted by the Smithsonian in the field of magic.

Blackstone appeared as a guest on The Tonight Show, Donahue, The Today Show, Reading Rainbow, The Super Mario Bros. Super Show! and 3-2-1 Contact. He also made occasional appearances as the mysterious Dr. Mephisto on the TV soap opera Santa Barbara and as fictitious magician Marcus the Magnificent on Hart to Hart in 1981. Of his several TV specials, the PBS two-hour special was unique due to the intros by some of The Muppets. Blackstone's "Backstage with Blackstone" appearances on PBS's Square One TV, where he used magic tricks to teach mathematics to young people, were some of his favorites. He was a regular host of ABC Weekend Specials in the 1980s.

Blackstone designed the illusions used on SeaWorld's water show featuring the DC Comics superheroes. They included The Joker cutting Batgirl up into multiple pieces, a variation of a classic multi-box illusion, and the first use in many years of the Jarrett pedestal to vanish Wonder Woman.

Blackstone and his wife Gay created and produced the special effects for "The Magic Summer Tour" for New Kids on The Block, as well as their "No More Games Tour". He also did special effects for Alice Cooper, Michael Jackson ("The Victory Tour"), Earth, Wind and Fire, and Jane's Addiction with Perry Farrell.

During his career, Blackstone toured the U.S. extensively. Notably, his Blackstone! The Magnificent Musical Magic Show played in 156 U.S. cities and Broadway at the Majestic Theatre from May 13 to August 17, 1980. It played 118 performances.

Blackstone received the Academy of Magical Arts Magician of the Year Award in 1979 and 1985.

== Death and legacy ==
Blackstone lived in Redlands, California. He died on May 14, 1997, in Loma Linda, California at the age of 62 due to pancreatic cancer.

After his death, much of his performance equipment was sold off in two highly publicized auctions held by Sotheby's and Darien Julian. Many of the pieces went to collectors scattered around the world, and numerous props have made it into actual shows. Las Vegas performer Scarlett now owns and uses his Topsy Turvy. David Copperfield houses the Tire Vanish (performed by Harry Blackstone Sr.) in his museum of magic. Touring illusionist Aaron Balcom uses the Owen-built Clown Jammer. Washington state performer John Walton uses his menacing Buzz Saw. Dutch illusionist Hans Klok and Darren Romeo perform the famous "Blackstone Floating Light Bulb" illusion under a licensing agreement with Blackstone Magik Enterprises Inc. (It is one of only two magic illusions to be protected as intellectual property.)

The Performing Arts Theater at Redlands East Valley High School is named in his honor.

His third wife and widow, Gay Blackstone, is the former president of The Magic Castle in Hollywood. Their daughter, Bellamie Blackstone, is a television producer; Harry and Gay's other children include son Harry Bouton Blackstone III.

Gay Blackstone appeared in the season 10 episode 14 Pawn Stars episode "Tricky Ricky", in 2014, and sold a vanishing birdcage prop used by both Harry Sr. and Harry Jr. to Rick Harrison for $2,600.

== Books ==
- Blackstone, Harry Jr., and Charles Reynolds and Regina Reynolds. The Blackstone Book of Magic and Illusion (1995) 248 pages. ISBN 978-1557041777. (New York: Newmarket Press, 2002). ISBN 1557044929
- Blackstone, Harry Jr. There's One Born Every Minute Los Angeles, Calif.: Jeremy P. Tarcher, Inc, 1976. Softcover. ISBN 0874770564.
- Blackstone, Harry Jr. My Life As A Magician Paperback (Aladdin: 1992-05-01) ISBN 978-0671644369.
- He also re-edited his father's Blackstone's Secrets of Magic. Paperback ISBN 978-0879802608
