= My Own (TV series) =

Television series

My Own is an American dating reality television series that aired on MTV in 2006. The show features a person obsessed with a celebrity, and a group of six contestants competing to win a date with the obsessed person.

== The show ==
The show starts with the introduction of the person who is seeking his/her singer. Then, two friends of him/her introduce themselves and the chooser, afterwards they head to the "My Own" studio, where they meet the six challengers. Then the trivia round starts. In this round the contestants have to answer trivia questions about the singer, followed by a mini singing and dancing round. After this round, the "chooser" chooses four contestants to pass to the next round. In the second round, the contestants show their houses and talk a bit about their hobbies and tastes, followed by a competition that involves something that has to do with the celebrity in cause. Afterwards the chooser eliminates one contestant. The final three contestants perform their favorite song of the artist in cause while dressed like in the music video.

The choreographer for the show was Chantal Robson.

== Artists featured ==
Celebrities who were featured in searches for a partner include:

- 50 Cent
- Ashanti
- Natasha Bedingfield
- Beyoncé
- Mary J. Blige
- Mariah Carey
- Ciara
- Kelly Clarkson
- Hilary Duff
- Fergie
- Brandon Flowers
- Dave Grohl
- Nick Lachey
- Avril Lavigne
- Adam Levine
- Jennifer Lopez
- Joel Madden
- Nelly
- Omarion
- P.Diddy
- Pink
- Rihanna
- Nicole Scherzinger
- Ashlee Simpson
- Jessica Simpson
- Shakira
- Britney Spears
- Justin Timberlake
- Kanye West
- Deryck Whibley
