= Louis Comte =

French magician (1788-1859)

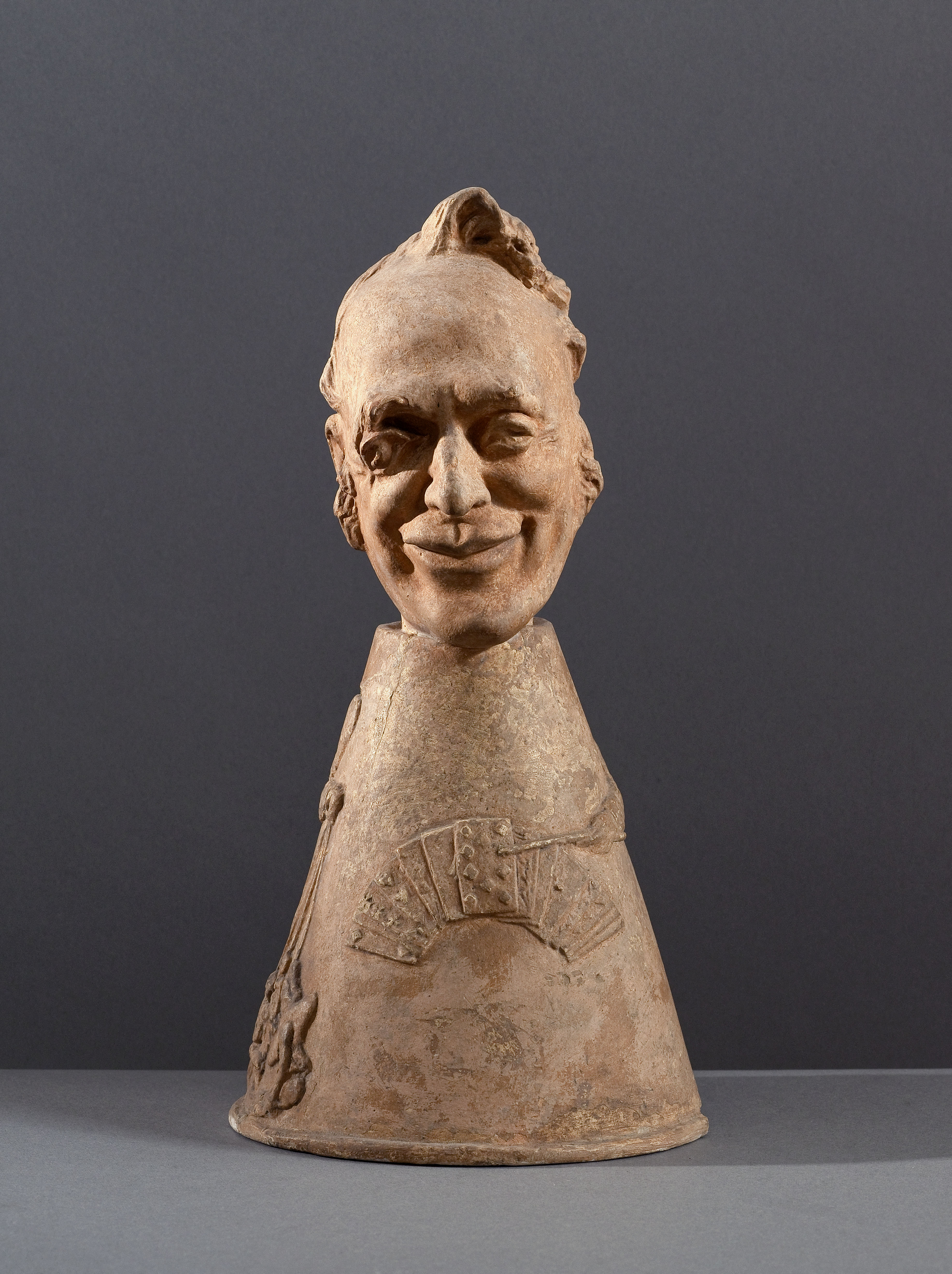
Statuette of Louis Comte by Jean-Pierre Dantan (Musée Carnavalet).

Louis Apollinaire Christien Emmanuel Comte "The King's Conjurer" (born Geneva, 22 June 1788 – Rueil, 25 November 1859), also known simply as Comte, was a celebrated nineteenth-century Parisian magician, greatly admired by Robert-Houdin.

He performed for Louis XVIII at the Tuileries Palace and was made a Chevalier de la Légion d'Honneur by Louis-Philippe. He was sometimes called "The Conjurer of the Three Kings" (Louis XVIII, Charles X, and Louis-Philippe). In 1814, Comte became the first conjurer on record to pull a white rabbit out of a top hat though this is also attributed to the much later John Henry Anderson.

Comte owned the Théâtre Comte passage des Panoramas of the 2nd arrondissement of Paris and another one in the Passage Choiseul.

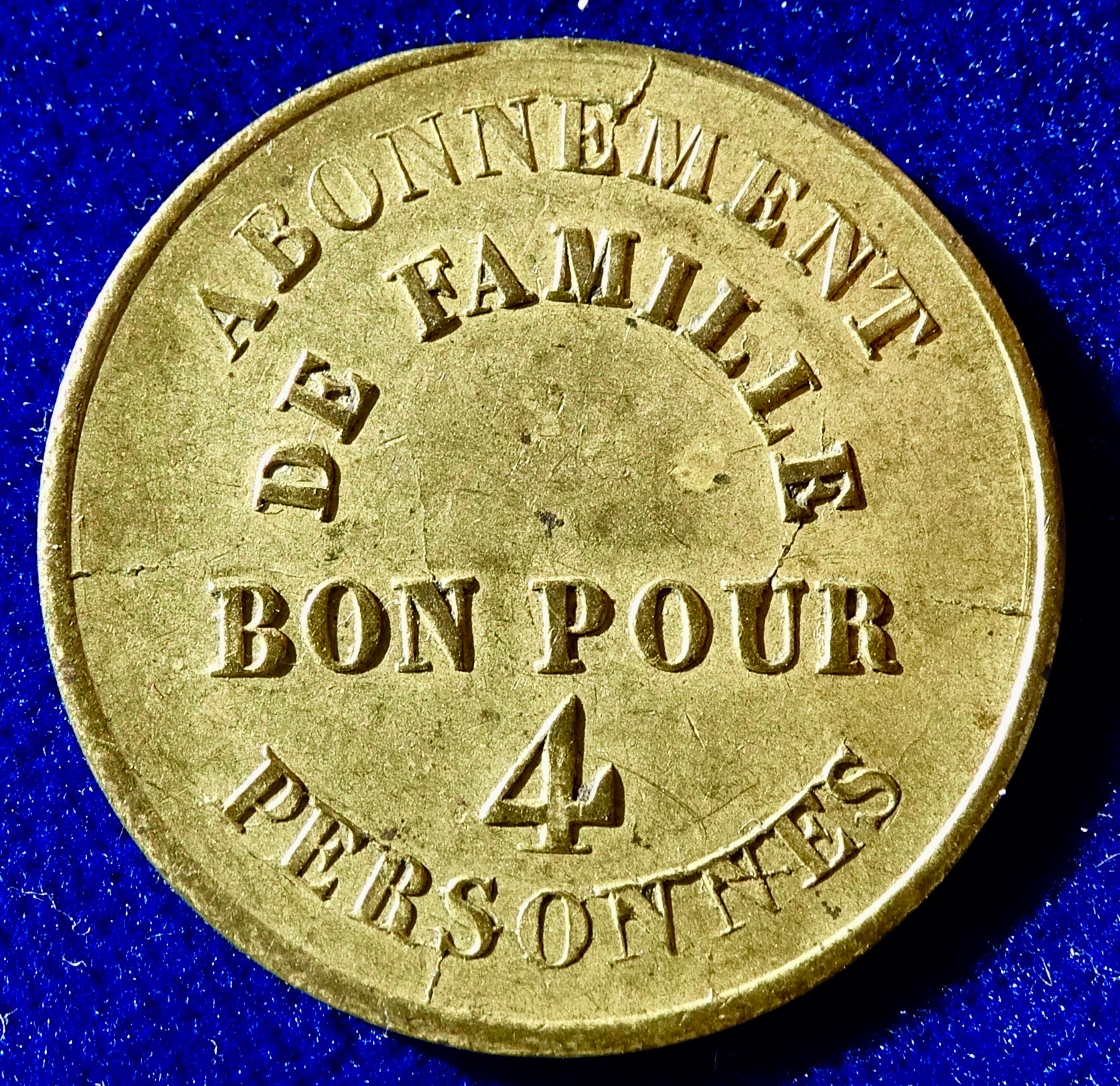
Admission token Théâtre Comte, passage Choiseul, for a family of 4, reverse.

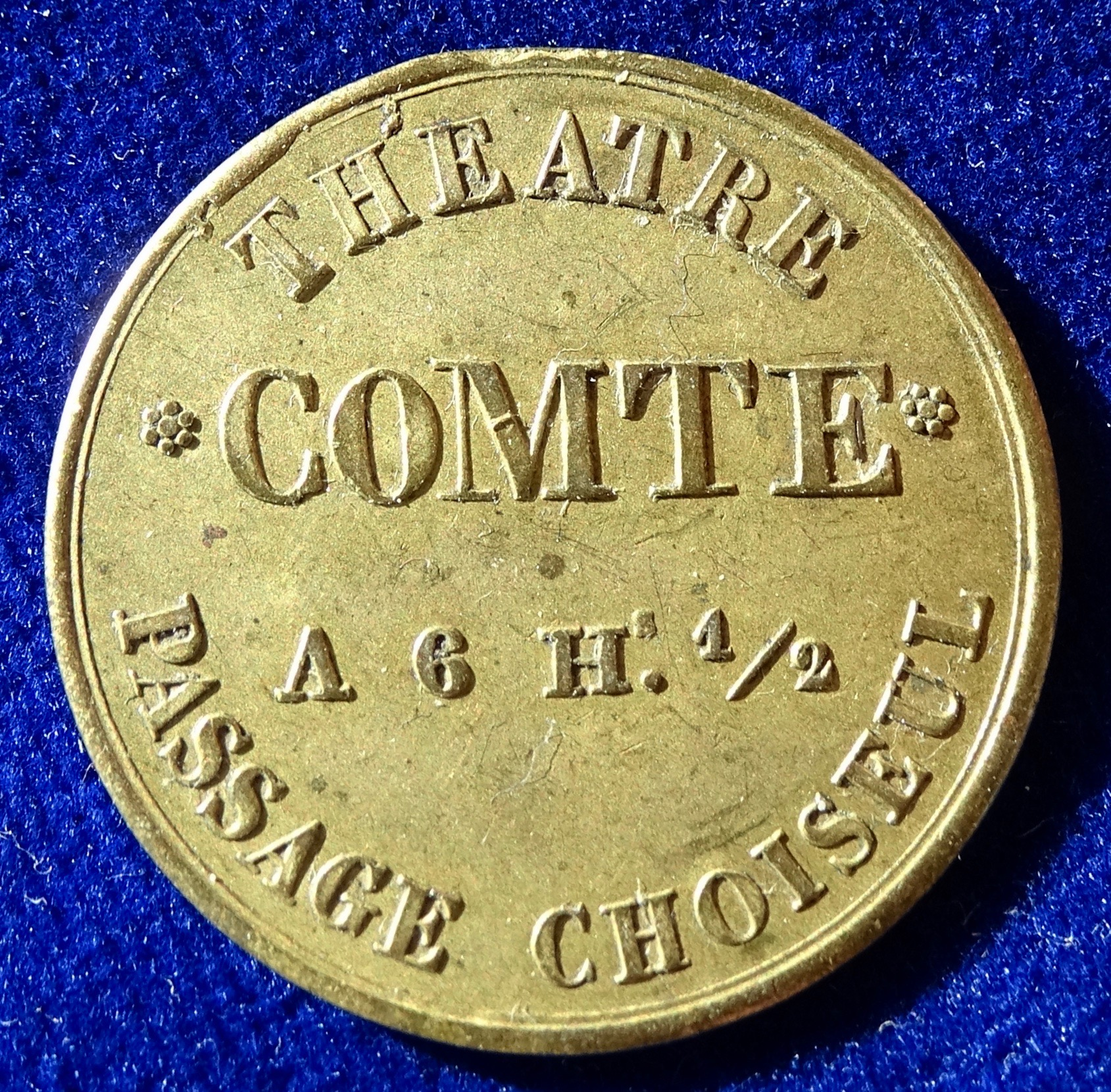
Admission token Théâtre Comte, passage Choiseul, for a family of 4, obverse.

== Bibliography ==
- Milbourne Christopher, David Copperfield, The Illustrated History of Magic, 2005, p. 133. ISBN 0-7867-1688-6.
- Henry Ridgely Evans, The Old and the New Magic, Chicago, 1906. Reprinted 2006, ISBN 1-4286-3672-2. p. 150ff.
- Paul Courville, Magic Tokens 2020, p. 32-33, ISBN 1727158539 @ www.magictoken.org
