= Harry Blackstone Sr. =

American magician and illusionist

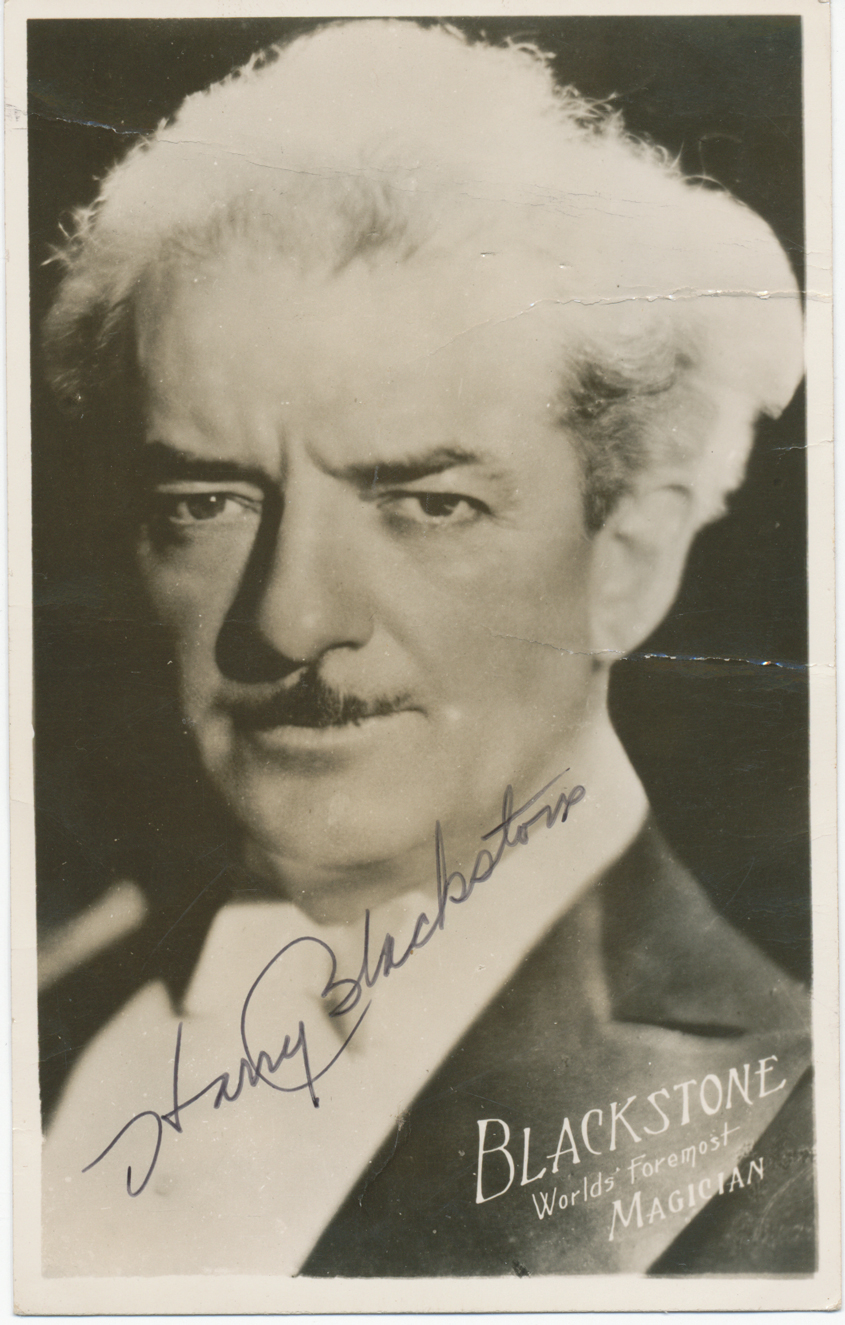
- Harry Blackstone on a 1944 postcard
- Born: Henry Boughton; September 27, 1885; Chicago, Illinois, U.S.
- Died: November 16, 1965 (aged 80); Hollywood, California, U.S.
- Other names: Harry Bouton; Harry Bouton Blackstone
- Occupation: Magician
- Spouse: Mildred Rose Phinney (m. 1933; div. 1941)
- Children: Harry Blackstone Jr.
- Relatives: Gay Blackstone (daughter-in-law); Bellamie Blackstone (granddaughter)

Harry Bouton Blackstone (born Henry Boughton; September 27, 1885 – November 16, 1965) was a famed stage magician and illusionist of the 20th century. Blackstone was born Harry Bouton in Chicago, Illinois. He began his career as a magician in his teens and was popular through World War II as a USO entertainer. He was often billed as The Great Blackstone. His son Harry Blackstone Jr. also became a famous magician. Blackstone Sr. was aided by his younger brother, Pete Bouton, who was the stage manager in all his shows. Blackstone Sr. was married three times. Blackstone Jr. was his son by his second wife.

== Performance style and career ==
Blackstone was in the model of courtly, elegant predecessor magicians like Howard Thurston and Harry Kellar, and the last of that breed in America. He customarily wore white tie and tails when performing, and he traveled with large illusions and a sizable cast of uniformed male and female assistants. For a number of years he toured in the Midwest, often performing throughout the day between film showings.

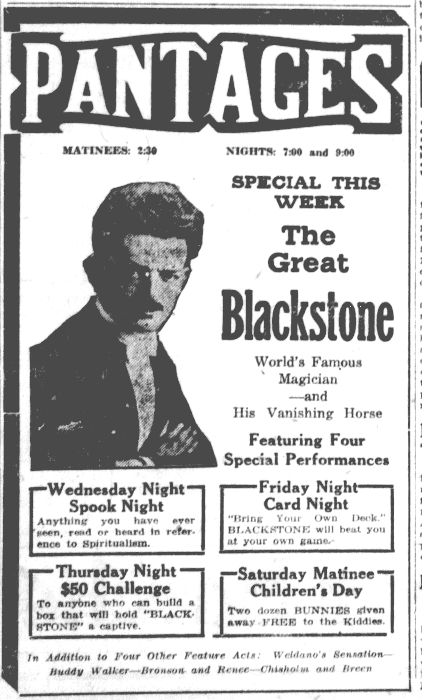
Image of the Great Blackstone in an ad for a performance in Seattle, 1922.

Blackstone remained silent during much of his big stage show, which was presented to the accompaniment of an organist or pit orchestra and such lively tunes of the time as "Who", "I Know That You Know", and "Chinatown".

Among his especially effective illusions was one in which a woman lay on a couch uncovered unlike the versions others performed in the day. It was called the Kellar Levitation which Blackstone called "The Dream of Princess Karnac". In another illusion, a woman stepped into a cabinet in front of many bright, clear, tubular incandescent light bulbs. When the magician suddenly pushed the perforated front of the cabinet backward the light bulbs protruded through the holes in the front of the box (to the accompaniment of the lady's blood-curdling scream). The cabinet was then revolved so that the audience seemed to see the lady impaled by the blinding filaments.

His "Sawing a woman in half" involved an electric circular saw some three to four feet in diameter mounted in an open frame. Blackstone's version differed from others in that the lady lay on a table that was pulled by a motor through the saw blade. Blackstone demonstrated the efficacy of the device by sawing noisily through a piece of lumber. Then a female assistant was placed on the saw table in full view, as wide metal restraints were clamped upon her midsection. The blade whirred and appeared to pass through her body, as ripping sounds were heard, the woman shrieked, and particles were scattered by the whirring blade. When the blade stopped she, of course, rose unharmed.

In a gentler turn was his "Vanishing bird cage", an effect in which a score or more of children were invited to join him on the stage and all "put their hands on" a tiny cage holding a canary. Blackstone lowered the cage and then seemed to toss it into the air: bird and cage "disappearing" in the process to the astonishment and delight of the surprised children.

Among his lovelier effects was "The Enchanted Garden", in which countless bouquets of brilliant feather flowers appeared from under a foulard and on tables and stands until the stage was a riot of color. "The Floating Light Bulb", was perhaps his signature piece. In a darkened theatre, Blackstone would take a lighted bulb from a lamp and float it, still glowing, through a small hoop. He would then come down from the stage and the lamp would float out over the heads of the audience. Dutch illusionist Hans Klok became the custodian of Blackstone Sr.'s famous "floating light bulb" illusion after the death of Blackstone Jr.

When not on tour, Blackstone lived on an island he called Blackstone Island. It was near Colon, Michigan, where he had a brief stint as co-owner of the Blackstone Magic Company. His partner in the business – which lasted only 18 months – was an Australian magician named Percy Abbott. After Blackstone and Abbott dissolved the company, Abbott, five years later, restarted his own magic manufacturing business in Colon. Called Abbott's Magic Novelty Company, the enterprise shipped simple, inexpensive tricks (with mimeographed instructions) to young boys and professional magicians over the world, while also building large illusions.

== Comic books and radio series ==
In 1941, Street & Smith made Blackstone the star of Super-Magician Comics, starting with issue #2 (May 1941). The comic was scripted by Blackstone's friend, magician Walter B. Gibson. In the comic, Blackstone traveled the world, performing amazing feats of magic and battling exotic villains. In issue #5, Blackstone rescues a young woman named Rhoda from pirates, and she becomes his regular sidekick. Blackstone appeared in the comic published monthly until February 1946 (Vol. 4, issue #10). The following month, he was replaced by another lead character, "Elliman, Ace of Magic".

In 1946, E.C. Stoner created a short-lived comics series, Blackstone, Master Magician, for Vital Publications. The comic ran for three issues, and was later revived for a single issue by EC Comics.

The comic was adapted in 1948 into a radio series, Blackstone, the Magic Detective, broadcast on WOR-Mutual. The show starred Ed Jerome as Harry Blackstone, with Ted Osborne and Fran Carlon as Blackstone's friends John and Rhoda. Each episode included a description of a magic trick that the youngsters in the audience could try at home. The syndicated mystery show aired from October 3, 1948, to April 3, 1949.

== Later years and death ==
Blackstone spent the last years of his life performing at The Magic Castle, a magical attraction in Hollywood, California. He died November 16, 1965, in Hollywood at the age of 80. He was interred close to his former home in Colon, Michigan, where the main street was renamed Blackstone Avenue in his honor.

== Legacy and tributes ==
In 1985, on the 100th anniversary of his father's birth, Harry Blackstone Jr. donated to the Smithsonian Institution in Washington D.C. the original floating light bulb – Thomas Edison designed and built it – and the original Casadega Cabinet, used in the "Dancing Handkerchief" illusion. This was the first ever donation accepted by the Smithsonian in the field of magic.

Harry Blackstone Sr. is memorialized in two official Michigan Historical markers:

- American Museum of Magic
- Colon, Michigan / Harry Blackstone
