= Hat-trick (magic trick) =

Magic trick where something is produced out of an apparently empty hat

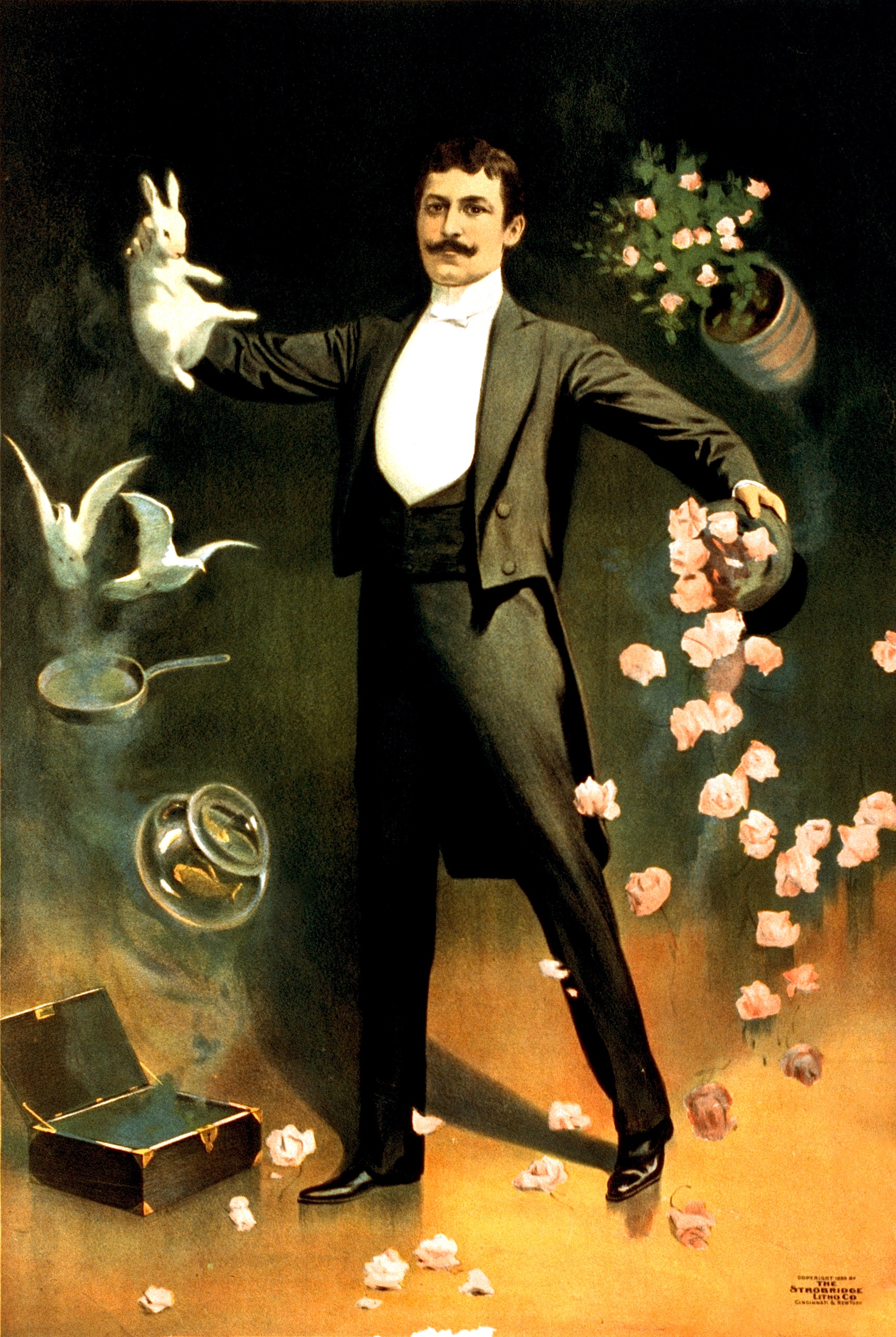
A 1899 advertising poster for a magician prominently featuring the hat-trick

The hat-trick is a classic magic trick where a performer will produce an object (traditionally a rabbit or a bouquet of flowers) out of an apparently empty top hat.

== Method ==
In its simplest form, the trick works by placing the hat on a specially made table or chest, often a hole in both the hat and the table. Both the hat, and the surface it is placed on, will have a hidden opening in them, through which an object stored in a compartment in the table or chest can be pulled. Alternatively, the performer can produce an item hidden in their sleeve using sleight of hand and misdirection. This eliminates the need to place the hat on a surface, and also allows the performer to give the hat to an audience member for inspection. However, producing a rabbit from a hat using nothing but sleight of hand is a much more difficult trick.

This trick is also traditionally performed for children, since it is a basic trick with basic props.

It is said that the earliest magician to pull a rabbit out of a hat was Louis Comte, in 1814, though this is also attributed to the much later John Henry Anderson.

== Popular culture ==
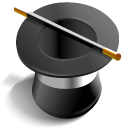
Top hat as an icon for magic

This magic clever trick is so well known that it has been referenced in a wide variety of media. The top hat used for the trick has become almost synonymous with stage magicians, and is commonly used as an icon to represent magic (such as the example on the right). Likewise, rabbits are so commonly associated with the trick that rabbits are often used to represent magic in general.

== See also ==
- Glossary of magic
