= Asrah levitation =

Levitation illusion

The Asrah levitation, sometimes called Lighter than Air, is a classic levitation illusion.

== Effect ==
The magician "hypnotizes" an assistant and commands them to recline on a table or couch. The assistant is then fully covered with a cloth and levitated under the cloth. The form of the assistant is still visible while levitating. Moments later, the assistant slowly floats down. As the magician pulls off the cloth, the assistant vanishes instantly. The assistant sometimes reappears in a different location, often in the audience.

== History ==
This illusion is credited to Servais Le Roy and was first performed with his wife as assistant in 1902.

== Method ==
The trick uses a form made of thin wire that is hidden behind the couch and suspended from above on fine wires. When the assistant lies down on the couch the form is quickly moved on top of her while the cloth cover is being deployed with a flourish. The form is then raised while the assistant escapes through a trap in the couch or the couch is removed offstage by stagehands. The wires making up the form are thin enough that when the cloth is removed, they cannot easily be seen against a complex backdrop.

== See also ==
- Balducci levitation
- David Copperfield's flying illusion
- King levitation
