= Max Malini =

Slavic-American magician

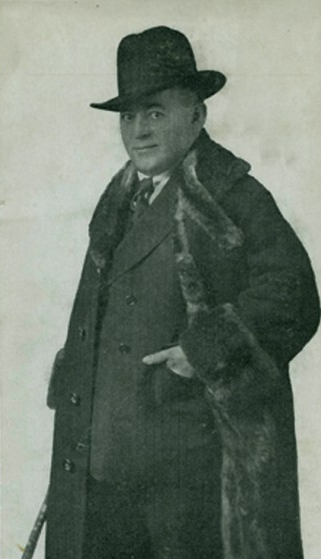
- Malini in 1925
- Born: Max Katz Breit; 1875; Ostrów, Poland
- Died: October 3, 1942; Honolulu, United States
- Occupation: Magician

Max Malini (born Max Katz Breit; 1875 – October 3, 1942) was a magician who at his peak performed for several US Presidents and at Buckingham Palace, receiving gifts from monarchs across Europe and Asia. Many magicians, such as Dai Vernon and Ricky Jay, have held him in high esteem for his skill and bold accomplishments.

== Career ==
Max Malini was born in the small town of Ostrow on the borders of Russia and Austria. At a young age, he immigrated to the US with his Jewish family, settling in New York City. He studied juggling at age twelve, but under the tutelage of a fire-eater, ventriloquist, and magician, "Professor" Frank Seiden, Max began his studies of magic when he was fifteen.

As he grew older, he began performing in bars. As his reputation grew, he would sell tickets to see a private show in his hotel room. He specialized in close-up magic, performing with coins and card magic.

Malini was part of that rare breed of performer, the itinerant magician, and even rarer breed of magician in that he performed magic based on sleight of hand rather than large illusions. (It made traveling much easier.)

His performance style was marked by great audacity. For instance, according to magician Paul Daniels in his show "The Magic of Max Malini," Max, speaking in a heavy Yiddish accent, would often walk up to a celebrity and, unannounced, bite a button from their cuff and magically restore it. He would also borrow a gentleman's hat for a coin effect, where he would cover the coin and attempt to make it flip over. This he would fail to do, but would finish by lifting the hat to reveal a block of ice under the hat, barely large enough to fit.

One of Malini's signature routines was the blindfold card stab, which operated as follows. On a table a pack of cards were mixed and swirled around by a lady from the audience. The audience would blindfold Max with handkerchiefs. Malini then requested the name of a playing card, and when someone called out a card, he would stab a knife into the cards, then raise it up in the air, thereupon it was seen that he had impaled the correct card.

After performing one of his tricks on Senator Mark Hanna without warning, Malini was later invited to perform for Hanna and his associates, which ultimately led to Malini performing at the White House. Over his career, Malini met or performed for Warren G. Harding, Theodore Roosevelt, Al Capone, John D. Rockefeller, and European royalty. Malini referred to himself as the "Napoleon of Magic".

He died in Honolulu, Hawaii, on October 3, 1942. He had been in poor health for some time and his last performances were done sitting in a chair.

== Other references ==
- Malini was referenced in the Season 7 episode of The X-Files titled "The Amazing Maleeni".
- The TV show The Cape had a regular character by this name, played by Keith David.
- The Magic of Max Malini starring Paul Daniels (DVD 2004)
- GENII magazine Oct.2012
- "Max Malini: King of Magicians, Magician of Kings," authored by Steve Cohen, Squash Publishing, 2022

== See also ==
- List of magicians
