= Platform magic =

Magic done for larger audiences than close-up magic

Platform magic (also known as parlor magic, stand-up magic or cabaret magic) is magic that is done for audiences larger than close-up magic but smaller than stage magic. It is more intimate than stage magic because it does not require expensive, large-scale stage equipment, and can thus be performed closer to the audience and without a stage. Many of the tricks performed by platform magicians are sufficiently angle-sensitive as to make them impossible to perform as close-up magic. Most working magicians are parlor/platform magicians.

Many magicians consider the term "parlor" to be old-fashioned and limiting, since this type of magic is often done in rooms much larger than the traditional parlor, or even outdoors. According to the Encyclopedia of Magic and Magicians by T.A. Waters, "The phrase [parlor magic] is often used as a pejorative to imply that an effect under discussion is not suitable for professional performance."

Parlor, or stand-up, magicians generally work without assistants (unlike stage magicians, who may have several in their crew – both backstage and on stage – and may travel thousands of miles between jobs). Performances of this category of magic include civic and fraternal organizations, business groups, private parties, youth groups, church societies, public dinners, and similar venues.

== Common types ==
Common platform magic tricks include:

- The "Miser's Dream" – a seemingly endless supply of coins is produced from thin air
- Sucker tricks, like the "die box", where a giant die is put in a two-compartment box. The magician makes it vanish but the audience believe he simply shifts it to the other compartment. Eventually the magician opens both sides of the box and the die is gone. It has appeared in a previously-empty hat.
- Audience participation tricks, like the breakaway wand, where a wand remains rigid for the magician but falls apart every time the volunteer touches it
- Production effects, like the square circle, in which a bottomless, topless box with a screened front encloses a bottomless, topless cylinder. Both are shown empty and put together again. The magician then produces large quantities of silk scarves, fruit, bottles, and so on from the "empty" cylinder, inside the square box

Many other effects could be considered to fit into this classification.

== Platform magicians ==
Platform magicians are not as well known to the general public as stage magicians such as David Copperfield and Penn & Teller. Some better-known ones include:

- David Abbott
- Steve Cohen
- Black Herman
- Fred Kaps
- Jeff McBride
- John Mulholland
- Channing Pollock
- Alan Shaxon

== See also ==
- American Museum of Magic
- Black box
- Bizarre magic
- Card magic
- Card throwing
- Cardistry
- Children's magic
- Coin magic
- Escape magic
- Hat-trick (magic trick)
- Flourish
- Gospel magic
- Illusionist
- List of magic tricks
- Magic Castle
- Mental magic
- Sleight of hand
- Street magic
- Terms
- Trick deck
- Tarbell Course
- The Magic Circle
- Timeline
- Theatrical séances
