= Neil Tobin =

American magician & entertainer (born 1966)

- Born: July 7, 1966 (age 60); Chicago, Illinois, United States
- Occupation: Magician
- Website: http://necromancerevents.com

Neil Tobin (born July 7, 1966) is a magical and psychic entertainer, mentalist, theatre producer and playwright, and a writer on related subjects. Since his performance material often involves themes of mortality and spirit contact—in addition to demonstrations of telepathy, precognition, magic, and even divination—he often performs as "Neil Tobin, Necromancer."

== Live performances ==
Tobin performed an original interactive theatre show about mortality as site-specific theatre at the historic Rosehill Cemetery in the Joseph Lyman Silsbee-designed May Chapel in spring of 2018, and reprised it in fall 2018. Entitled Neil Tobin, Necromancer: Near Death Experience, it previewed at Indianapolis Theatre Fringe Festival in August 2017, where it received the Audience Choice Award. He plans to bring the show to funeral homes and cemetery chapels in New York and Los Angeles.

In November and December 2015, Tobin played Erik Jan Hanussen in the premiere of his original play Palace of the Occult. Its first performance was on a Friday the 13th at Chicago's Prop Thtr, where a portion of the proceeds benefited the Illinois Holocaust Museum and Education Center.

He periodically appears as narrator with live orchestra, performing Peter and the Werewolf, his original narration of Prokofiev's Peter and the Wolf accompanied by magical effects.

Starting on Friday the 13th of February 2004, Tobin began performing Supernatural Chicago at the Excalibur nightclub in Chicago. He was the show's writer, producer, director and sole performer. The show, which was "popular with out-of-towners looking for a Chicago experience" and with "fans of theatrical magic", closed February 28, 2014 after a 10-year run.

Tobin was a Medium of the Houdini Seance at Excalibur nightclub annually from October 2001 to October 2014. The event was presented on behalf of the Chicago Assembly of the Society of American Magicians during the last week of October to commemorate the late magician's death. Houdini helped found the Chicago Assembly in 1919.

For private and corporate engagements, Tobin performs psychic-themed feature-length shows. He also entertains at private parties with his "Strolling Psychic Sorcery", featuring his abilities as a palmist, tarot reader and mentalist.

== Performances in other media ==
Tobin has performed on broadcasts for WBEZ-FM, WGN-AM with Jonathon Brandmeier, WCKG-FM, KISS-FM, and WGN-TV (opposite Gary Sinise). He has appeared on "Forbidden History" on The Science Channel, "Ghost Adventures" and "Haunted Places" on The Travel Channel, and "Dead Famous" on The History Channel. He can also be seen in the documentary feature "Hearing Is Believing" on the DVD release of the film White Noise. His original Halloween-themed narrative for Prokofiev's Peter and the Wolf, entitled Peter and the Werewolf, appears on a CD with the Melbourne Symphony Orchestra.

== Service ==
Outside his darker performing persona, Tobin helped empower hospitalized children through magical performance during his time as Assistant Director of Magic and Community Development for the nonprofit Open Heart Magic.

== Writing ==
Books: Tobin contributed two academic research papers to Magic, Magicians and Detective Fiction: Essays on Intersecting Modes of Mystery edited by Rebecca Josephy and Published by McFarland in January 2025, which has been hailed as a "groundbreaking study" and "the first major scholarly work to make an extended and explicit connection between magic and detective fiction" providing "vital contributions to the emerging field of magic studies." He is writer and photographer of the art book Near Death Experience: Cemetery Resolutions. He is also co-writer and editor of the biography, Unspeakable Acts: Three Lives and Countless Legends of Tom Palmer/Tony Andruzzi/Masklyn ye Mage.

Museum exhibits: Tobin wrote "Magical History Tour," an exhibit on Chicago's contributions to the world of magical performance, which ran from June 2010–January 2011 at the Elmhurst Historical Museum; it was awarded a Certificate of Excellence from the Illinois Museum Association. He was also a consultant for "Magic", a temporary exhibit running June 2012-January 2013 at the Chicago History Museum.

Periodicals and plays: Tobin has contributed material to several magicians' publications, including Genii (magazine), M-U-M, Vibrations, Magicol, and Oracle. He has written three plays (in which he has also performed): Neil Tobin, Necromancer: Near Death Experience, Palace of the Occult and Supernatural Chicago.

== Consulting ==
Theatre companies have hired Tobin to provide technical assistance, design magical sequences, create specialized props, and teach performance techniques to their actors. These productions have included "Ingmar Bergman's The Magician" for National Pastime Theater; "The Days Are Shorter" for Pride Films and Plays; and two acclaimed productions at Chicago's Mercury Theater: the Jeff Award-nominated production of "Barnum" and the Jeff Award-winning production of The Addams Family.

== Affiliations ==
Tobin is recipient of the Lederman Award for Creativity from the Psychic Entertainers Association (PEA), and two Presidential Citations from the Society of American Magicians (SAM). He has been the subject of a cover story for the SAM national magazine M-U-M (February 2014); served on the Board of Directors for the PEA, and is past president of the Chicago Assembly of the SAM, where he founded and chaired the Chicago Magic Competition at the Peggy Notebaert Nature Museum, the Chicago History Museum, and a run of five summers at Navy Pier.

== Bibliography ==
- Tobin, Neil (Spring 2026). "'Magical red herrings' : personalized experience and specialized knowledge in Clayton Rawson's The Footprints on the Ceiling". Clues : a journal of detection. 44 (1): 28–37.
