= Burling Hull =

Magician

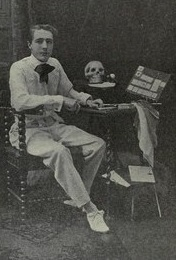
- Born: September 9, 1889
- Died: November 1982 (aged 93)
- Occupation: Magician

Burling Hull (September 9, 1889 – November 1982) was an inventive magician, self-styled "the Edison of magic," specializing in mentalism and sleight of hand effects. During the greater part of his life he lived in DeLand, Florida. His aliases and stage names included: "Volta the Great", "The Man with the Radar Mind", "The White Wizard," and "Gideon ('Gid') Dayn."

== Career ==
Hull claimed to be — and is generally credited as — the inventor of the Svengali deck of cards, which he patented in 1909. He claimed to have invented more than 500 magical effects and he was a prolific writer, with 52 published books to his name, including Sealed Mysteries and Sleights, The Encyclopedia of Stage Illusions, Sealed Mysteries, and How to Answer Questions for Crystal Gazing and Mind Reading Acts. He wrote on a wide variety of magical subjects, including card tricks, mentalism, escapes, razor blade swallowing, sightless vision, billiard ball manipulation, silk magic, second sight acts, publicity, and showmanship.

Hull not only produced many titles about magical effects, he also performed and taught magic for more than 80 years. In his earlier "White Wizard" years, he performed an act dressed entirely in white in which he made billiard balls and silks vanish, multiply, and reappear. In later years he gave talks to magic conventions on business methods for entertainers.

Hull was active in the movement to recognize that there are intellectual rights to magic methods and he was a strong advocate for the protection of magic trade secrets by both patents on the gimmicks and copyright on the texts, as applicable. However, he undercut his own ethical stance against plagiarism by publishing secret material from other magicians who had stolen ideas from him, in order to get revenge for having been plagiarized.

In the late 1950s, Hull published a newsletter, The G_d D__n Truth About Magic, mainly for the purpose of criticizing the equally famous mentalist Robert A. Nelson, known on stage as "Korda RaMayne." Hull used the pseudonym Gideon ("Gid") Dayn to expose Nelson's effects under the pretense of "reviewing" them.

Hull's weighty three-volume Encyclopedic Dictionary of Mentalism, published in 1961, was the largest compilation of mentalism sleights, gimmicks, effects, patter, and illusions in one collection up to that date. This work was also notable as the venue in which Hull continued to carry out his excoriating feud with Robert Nelson, whom Hull accused in print of teaching mentalism to gamblers and racketeers in order that they might commit what Hull called "thievery of the public." He also criticised Nelson for selling hoodoo folk magic curios that Hull said were used in rituals of "black magic and Devil worship".

In his final years, Hull lost his eyesight, a loss he never learned to accept. He died at the age of 93 in a nursing home. Hull's life and his impact upon the world of stage magic were described in a 1977 biography, The Edison of Magic and His Incredible Creations, written by Samuel Patrick Smith. Both his Svengali Deck of 1909 and his 33 Rope Ties and Chain Releases, written in 1915, are still popular today. While living in DeLand, the same town as Herbert L Becker, Burling and Becker worked together on illusions for Becker's tour with Alice Cooper

== Correspondence with Harry Houdini ==
Hull was the author of 33 Rope Ties and Chain Releases (1915). It was alleged that the magician Harry Houdini had borrowed information for his own Magical Rope Ties and Escapes (1921). However, a 1947 edition of Hull's book has an introduction titled "Houdini Did Not Steal This Book". According to Hull:

"It is true that a book DID appear with the name of Houdini listed as the 'author', which did steal the entire contents of my original book. It purloined the original 'Patter" and the original presentations for the tricks and even reproduced exactly several of the illustrations. In addition this counterfeit book deliberately changed the names of the original tricks bearing my name and avoided giving any credit to the original author and inventor ... But Houdini explained away the matter [and] paid me a fair but moderate sum ... I accepted his explanation as plausible and ... we remained good friends."

Similar to Houdini, exposing the tricks of spiritualist mediums interested Hull. His writings on this subject were collected and published in 1977 under the title The Billion Dollar Bait.

== Publications ==
- Expert Billiard Ball Manipulation (1910)
- Sealed Mysteries (1911)
- A Modern Handkerchief Act (1914)
- Bulletin Of Latest Sleights And Tricks (1914)
- Great East Indian Rope Trick (1914)
- Master Sleights With Billiard Balls (1914)
- The Art of the Stage (1914)
- Sleights (1914)
- 33 Rope Ties and Chain Releases (1915)
- The Challenge Handcuff Act (1916)
- The Real Secret of the Stage Second Sight Act (1916)
- How to Answer Questions for Crystal Gazing and Mind Reading Acts (1927)
- The World's Cut and Restored Rope Tricks (1927)
- Expert Manipulation (1928)
- Sealed Message Reading Acts (1929)
- The Volta System For The Feat Of Reading Sealed Messages (1929)
- The Miracle of Floating Light (1931)
- The Last Word Blindfold Methods (1932)
- Thirty One Man Mind Reading (1935)
- Burling Hull's Three Wow Card Hits (1939)
- Annemann's Card Miracles And Annemann's Mental Mysteries (1940)
- The Dictionary of Mentalism (1961)
- The Billion Dollar Bait (1977)
- The Edison of Magic and His Incredible Creations (1977)
