= Wittus Witt =

German magician, author and publisher (born 1949)

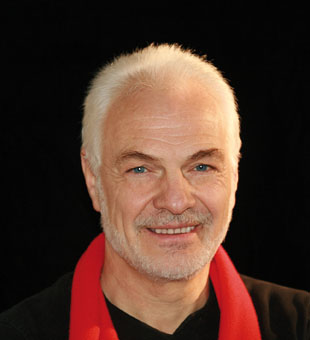
- Wittus Witt
- Born: Hans-Günter Witt; 7 August 1949; Versmold, West Germany
- Occupation: Magician
- Website: http://www.wittuswitt.de/

Wittus Witt (born 1949) is a German magician, author, museum director and publisher.

== Biography ==
Witt went to the State Art Academy in Dusseldorf to study an art teacher. Afterwards, he moved to the College of Design in Dusseldorf in 1976 and earned his degree as a designer.

From 1993 to 1995 he appeared regularly on the radio and has performed over two hundred times on television. From 1994 to 1997 he had his own television series: "Tele-spell with Wittus Witt" in which he performed interactive magic tricks every second week live with a spectator.

Witt is one of the founding members of the association of full-time magicians "The Professionals", which met for the first time in autumn 1989.

Since 1977 Witt has published the well-known magic directory "International Magic Yellow Pages" which appear in a 3-years cycle. The publication contains currently more than 1,300 names from all over the world. Since 2006 it is also available as an E-book version.

In 2000 he took over Germany's magic magazine Magische Welt, in which he previously published articles and a column. He has also developed the German language version of Magicpedia.

In 2011 Witt founded the annual Hamburg magic nights, in which several magicians show their full evening shows during one weekend.

In 2012 he opened Germany’s first art gallery dedicated to the art of magic and visual art connected with magic. After ten years he closed down the gallery and opened Germany’s first cultural museum for the art of magic, named "Bellachini", December 18, 2022.

== Awards ==
- First Prize Comedy Magic 1976, Vienna, FISM World Congress of Magic

== Books ==
- 1977 Die Zauberwelt, DIN-A-5-Format, Adressen von Zauberhändlern, Sammlern, Fachzeitschriften etc.
- 1978 Der Zaubergesell, Zauberkasten, Nürburg-Spiele, Franz Dumke
- 1978 Der Zauberjunior, Zauberkasten, Nürburg-Spiele, Franz Dumke
- 1979 Gelbe Zauber-Seiten Nr. 2, Adressen von Zauberhändlern, Sammlern, Fachzeitschriften etc.
- 1980 A-B-C of Magic Sets, Periodikum über die Entwicklung des Zauberkastens, (in englischer Sprache) bis 2004, 73 Ausgaben
- 1980 Katalog zur Ausstellung „ZAUBER-Kästen und Plakate“, Ulrich und Ulrike, Düsseldorf
- 1980 Ted aktiv Bastelmappe #1, Flaschenwanderung, Schreiber Verlag, Esslingen
- 1980 Ted aktiv Bastelmappe #2, Das Becherspiel, Schreiber Verlag, Esslingen
- 1981 Faksimile-Zauberkasten „Der kleine Zauberer“ nach einem Original von 1880, Franz-Josef Holler, München
- 1981 Hokus Pokus Bastelei, ein Bastel- und Zauberkasten, Spear-Spiele, Nürnberg
- 1982 Gelbe Zauber-Seiten Nr. 3
- 1982 Ted aktiv Bastelmappe #3, Würfelwanderung, Schreiber Verlag, Esslingen
- 1982 Katalog zur Ausstellung „Zauberwelt der Taschenspieler“, Clemens-Sels-Museum, Neuss
- 1982 Ted aktiv Bastelmappe #4, Würfelpokal, Schreiber Verlag, Esslingen
- 1983 Faksimile-Zauberschachtel Der Zauberer nach einem Original von 1920, Franz-Josef Holler, München
- 1984 Ted aktiv Bastelmappe #5, Der blühende Kaktus, Schreiber Verlag, Esslingen
- 1984 Gelbe Zauber-Seiten Nr. 4, International Yellow Magic Pages
- 1984 Katalog zur Ausstellung „Zauberwelt der Taschenspieler“, Städtische Galerie im Park, Viersen
- 1985 Wittus Witt Zaubershow, ein Bastel- und Zauberkasten, ASS Verlag
- 1986 Taschenspieler-Tricks, Heinrich Hugendubel Verlag, München, ISBN 3-88034-273-3.
- 1987 Gelbe Zauber-Seiten Nr. 5, International Magic Yellow Pages,
- 1987 Zauberkästen, Heinrich Hugendubel Verlag, München, ISBN 3-88034-338-1.
- 1988 Wunder Wochen, Informationen über Wittus Witts Aktivitäten, alle 12 Wochen, insgesamt 4 Ausgaben
- 1988 FISM FINALE, eine Zusammenfassung des 17. Weltkongresses der Zauberkunst in Den Haag, Holland, (in Englisch)
- 1988 Taschenspieler-Tricks, 2. Auflage
- 1988 Zaubertricks, SIMEX Basteln, Richard Simm&Söhne
- 1988 Faksimile-Zauberkasten „L’Escamoteur“ nach einem Original von 1920, Franz-Josef Holler, München
- 1990 Gelbe Zauber-Seiten Nr. 6, International Magic Yellow Pages
- 1990 Cortini - Monographie eines deutschen Zauberkünstlers, Eigenverlag
- 1990 Zaubermappe 1, Schreiber-Modellbau-Bogen, Esslingen
- 1990 Zaubermappe 2, Schreiber-Modellbau-Bogen
- 1991 Wittus Witts gewitzte Zauber-Spiele, 21 Tricks in der Streichholzschachtel, Eigenverlag
- 1991 A-B-C of FISM ’91, eine Zusammenfassung des 18. Weltkongresses in Lausanne, Schweiz, (in Englisch) 8 Seiten
- 1991 Canon Zaubertricks, Die Magie der Farben: CLC 300, ein Zauberset für Canon, Auflage 350 Exemplare
- 1991 Taschenspieler-Tricks, 3. Auflage
- 1991 A-B-C of Faxic, gefaxtes Mitteilungsblatt für Profizauberer, (in Englisch) bis 1994 56 Ausgaben
- 1993 Gelbe Zauber-Seiten Nr. 7, Intern. Magic Yellow Pages, ISBN 3-499-18934-8.
- 1994 Zaubertricks - Tips und Techniken für Taschenspieler, rororo
- 1996 Gelbe Zauber-Seiten Nr. 8, International Magic Yellow Pages
- 1997 A-B-C of FISM ’97, eine Zusammenfassung des 20. Weltkongresses in Dresden, (in Englisch)
- 1997 Kuk-Tele-Zauber, Video plus Heft, 12 x 20 cm, sic!-Verlag
- 1999 Gelbe Zauber-Seiten Nr. 9, Inter. Magic Yellow Pages
- 1999 The Goodliffe Memorial Lecture, 10 x 21 cm
- 2000 A-B-C of FISM 2000, eine Zusammenfassung des 21. Weltkongresses in Lissabon, Portugal, (in Englisch)
- 2001 Werry – Ein Leben rund um die „magische“ Welt, Eigenverlag, ISBN 978-3-00-037040-3.
- 2003 Gelbe Zauber-Seiten Nr. 10, International Magic Yellow Pages
- 2003 A-B-C of FISM 2003, eine Zusammenfassung des 22. Weltkongresses in Den Haag, Holland, (in Englisch)
- 2006 Gelbe Zauber-Seiten Nr. 11, International Magic Yellow Pages
- 2008 Zaubern und Verzaubern, Verlag Eppe, ISBN 3-89089-862-9.
- 2008 Zaubergaukeleien, Verlag Eppe, ISBN 978-3-89089-860-5
- 2014 65 Zauber-Geschichten, Magische Welt, ISBN 978-3-00-045949-8
- 2014 Buch-Zauber-Buch, Galerie-W, ISBN 978-3-00-046585-7
- 2014 Karten für Zauberer, Galerie-W, ISBN 978-3-00-047548-1
