= Mechanical magic =

Class of illusion magic which is performed for an audience

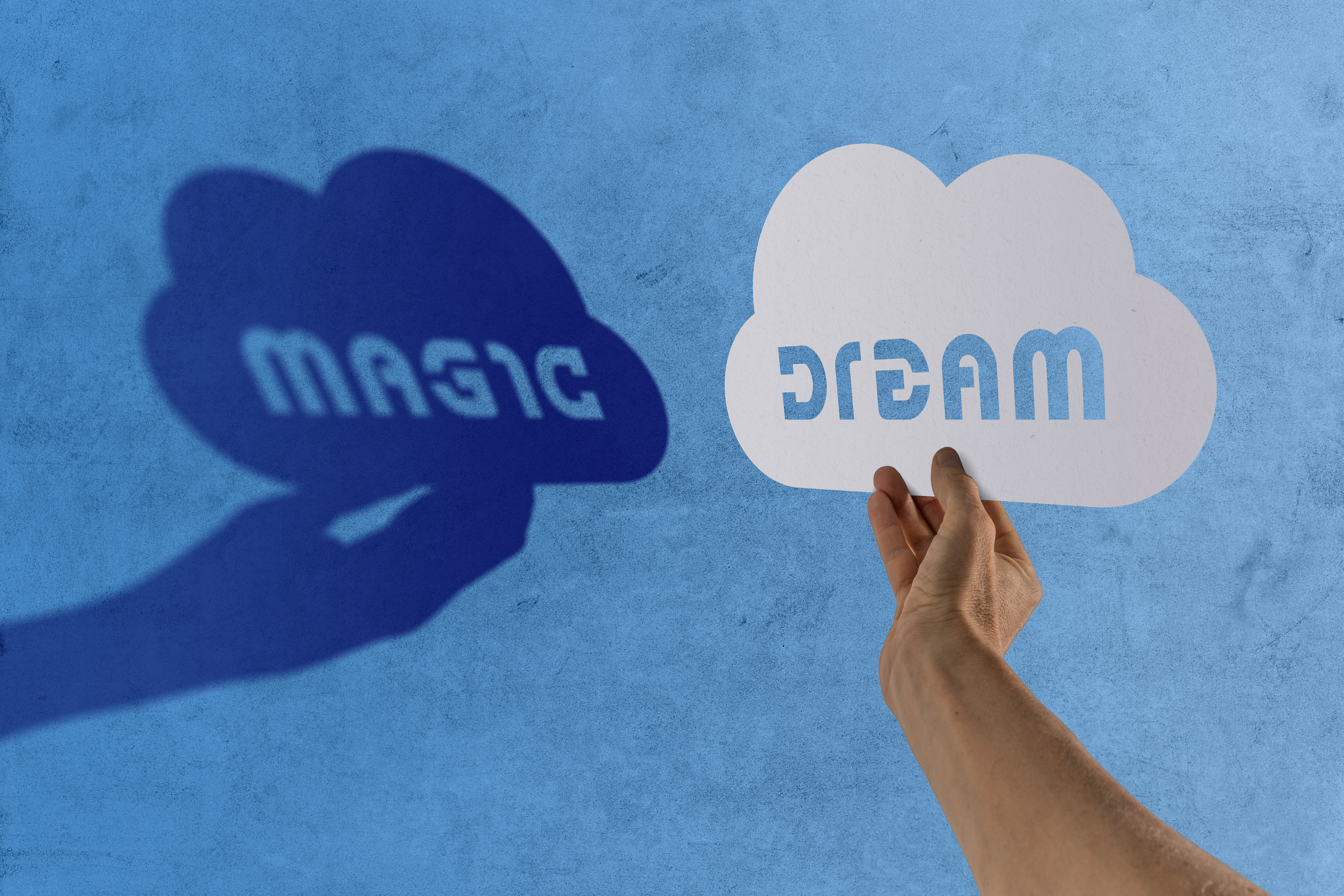
Mechanical magic using a card with holes as letter shapes. Ambigram Magic / Dream with a handheld pattern giving a reversed shadow by mirror symmetry. There is an expression, "it's all done with smoke and mirrors", used to explain something baffling.

Mechanical magic constitutes a class of illusion magic which is performed for an audience, often in a theater or upon a stage. In this form of magic, the magician appears to perform a series of seemingly impossible feats aided by various hidden mechanical devices which are operated without the audience detecting their action. It was popular during the late 19th and early 20th centuries.

An example of this kind of magic is called "The Flight of the Timepieces": in this trick one or more watches are placed into a mortar having a false bottom and chute. The magician then appears relocate these watches to a separate wooden frame some distance away through a pair of silk scarves.

This class of magic also includes various automata which are operated by internal mechanisms, but which appear to behave as living animals or as people, with moving limbs, eyes, and heads.
