= Theatrical séance =

Aspect of mentalism

A theatrical séance is an aspect of mentalism that purports to give its audiences the feeling of contacting the spirits of the dead, as might be experienced in a successful Spiritualist séance.

Theatrical séances are usually performed in either total or partial darkness to replicate the atmosphere of a traditional seance, to set the mood for the performance, and to hide the methods of the performer. Performance-goers may be treated to a variety of mentalism demonstrations during a theatrical séance, including examples of clairvoyance, ESP, precognition and telekinesis, in addition to or in preparation of apparent mediumship.

== Popular examples ==
Theatrical séances are very popular at Halloween and are often offered for fright value. Private magic cabarets may offer this type of performance, including:

The Dorothy Dietrich and Dick Brooks Psychic Theater in Scranton in the Poconos offers theatrical séances year round. Its production of "Haunted! Mysteries of THE Beyond!" is one of the longest running performances of its type having started in 2003. The Fall 2008 issue of the Pennsylvania Pursuits Magazine put out by the Pennsylvania Tourism Office of the Commonwealth of Pennsylvania picked the location of Psychic Theater at 1433 N. Main Avenue in Scranton, Pennsylvania as one of the 10 most haunted places in Pennsylvania, placing it at number 9.

The Houdini Museum offers yearly Houdini séances geared specifically toward "contacting Houdini." The original Houdini séances were done by Houdini's wife Beatrice (Bess) for ten years after Houdini died. She found doing the Houdini séance each year very stressful, possibly hoping against hope that if anyone could escape from the other side and return in a séance, it would be Houdini. At the end of ten years she passed the honor, legacy and tradition of doing the Houdini seances to friend, confidant and Houdini ghost writer Walter B. Gibson. She announced "ten years is long enough to wait for any man!" Gibson was also writer of The Shadow series that became a series of pulp novels, comic books, a radio show, a TV show and a movie that starred Alec Baldwin. From the 1970s on Gibson would attend the Houdini seances at New York's Magic Towne House, run by Dorothy Dietrich and Dick Brookz. Before Walter died, he passed on the tradition to Dietrich, who continues to do the Houdini Séance each year.

A Houdini seance has been presented by Neil Tobin, Necromancer at the Excalibur nightclub annually since October 2001. This event is presented on behalf of the Chicago Assembly of the Society of American Magicians during the last week of October to commemorate the late magician's death; Houdini helped found the Chicago Assembly in 1919.

A short theatrical seance also concludes Supernatural Chicago, a popular interactive theater show by Neil Tobin. It is currently in its seventh straight year of performances.

During the 2020 pandemic, virtual seances became popular. Popular practitioners of the theatrical virtual séance format have included Todd Robbins and Vince Wilson. Vince Wilson has performed thousands of seances since 1998 and lectures on the topic regularly, often appearing on television, radio, and podcasts as an authority on the topic.

Los Angeles' Magic Castle has a separate room dedicated to theatrical séances. Their evening séance program entitled, "Demons" is a recreation of a Victorian-era séance replete with mediumistic staples such as table-rapping, slate (writing), spirit photography, eerie inexplicable sounds and many other "psychic" experiments.

Another popular theatrical séance, this one touring theatrical stages and smaller venues, entitled Phantoms, was presented by mentalist Gregory Bishop (Edmonds). Phantoms employed items associated with, and actually belonging to, Sir Arthur Conan Doyle and Harry Houdini. First presented in 1995, it was designed for presentation in two versions: the larger, and more family-friendly stage version, and the smaller (somewhat "scarier" version), presented in private homes and in club settings. The larger, stage version of the show included the spirit cabinet illusion, along with a spirit trumpet, floating table and various other mainstays of the Victorian séance scene.

== Ethics and legality ==
Theatrical séances are not intended to be "real" séances and should only be seen as entertainment; hence the adjective, theatrical. According to Houdini, if the séance leader is honest and admits his trickery, he is a theatrical performer; if not, he is a charlatan and a fraud. Ethically, a paying audience should be notified beforehand that they will be experiencing a work of interactive theater rather than an actual Spiritualist seance. Once the audience is inside the performance space, however, the performer's primary responsibility is to create a convincingly realistic theatrical experience, just as in other forms of theater. Additionally, the ambiguity of whether every manifestation is the result of deception or not may be part of the enjoyment that a theatrical seance provides.

== Spiritualistic and mediumistic performers ==
- Eugene Burger (creator and performer of "Hauntings")
- Dorothy Dietrich & Dick Brooks (entertainer) (co-creator and performer/Psychic Theater)
- Harry Houdini (prior to becoming a debunker of Spiritualist frauds)
- Harry Kellar (With the Davenport Brothers and later in his own illusion shows)
- Matt the Knife (creator and Medium of the seance "Epitaph")
- Neil Tobin, Necromancer (creator of Supernatural Chicago and Medium for The Houdini Seance at Excalibur (nightclub)
- Paul W. Draper (creator and performer of "Seance") at historic theaters and haunted houses seasonally
- Anthem And Aria (creator and performer of "The All American Haunting" and “3 Ghosts”) at museums, private venues, haunted houses, and colleges nationwide.
