= Exposure (magic) =

Revelations about magic tricks

Exposure in magic refers to the practice of revealing the methods of magic tricks.

The practice is generally frowned upon amongst magicians, who believe that it ruins the experience of magical performances for audiences.

Exposure is uniquely impactful to magicians, as magic relies heavily on the elusive nature of secrets and methods in order to create mystery.

== Background ==
Magic effects have been exposed by both professional and amateur magicians. Some magic effects have been exposed in stage shows, and in other public media including television, the Internet, certain video sharing interfaces, discussion forums, and blogs.

One notable case of exposure on network television involved Val Valentino, performing as the "Masked Magician" in the Fox series Breaking the Magician's Code: Magic's Biggest Secrets Finally Revealed, which ran between 1997 and 1998. Valentino was ostracized by the magic community and received much criticism from magicians for contravening the joint International Brotherhood of Magicians and Society of American Magicians ethics statement.

Penn & Teller have often exposed their own tricks for the purposes of entertainment. Penn Jillette has stated that while the duo show the audience how a trick is done, it is often done so quickly or with different mechanics that the audience is unable to follow. This highlights the need to distinguish apparent exposures performed by magicians during an act, which often turn out to be illusions in their own right.

== Arguments ==
=== Supporting exposure ===
Reason	Argument	Counter-argument
Education	New magicians need to learn somewhere. Exposure enables young magicians to develop their skills across a wide range of magical methods.	There are many accepted methods of teaching magic that target those who want to perform, rather than those who just want to know the secret.
Innovation	Exposure of old tricks forces magicians to develop new ones.	Developing new tricks is a difficult, time-consuming process. Rather than encourage innovation, exposure may discourage the process. Moreover, innovation is encouraged through competition and collaboration between magicians.
Appreciation of skill	Exposure allows spectators to fully appreciate the range of skills involved in performing magic tricks.	The entertainment provided in magic is heightened by not knowing how the trick is achieved - unlike, e.g., juggling, where appreciation of the skill of the juggler adds to the experience.
Audience satisfaction	Exposure allows the audience to feel "complete" after watching the performance, instead of being left with an unsatisfactory, nagging cliffhanger.	The cliffhanger is key to the performance; not knowing how it is achieved keeps the trick magical and mysterious, instead of rendering it a simple step-by-step "how-to do this" exercise.

=== Opposing exposure ===
Reason	Argument	Counter-argument
Devaluation of tricks	Exposure devalues magic tricks by removing their potential to surprise audiences. Exposures are oversimplified to the degree that they cheapen the art.	The dangers of exposure are easily exaggerated. Many magic tricks which have been exposed in the past remain popular with audiences. In addition, many members of the public are indifferent to exposures and will neither seek them out nor remember the details for long. Finally, there exist strategies that allow a magician to continue to fool an audience even if they've been exposed to secrets for similar, or even identical, effects.
Intellectual property	Exposure violates the intellectual property rights of the creator of the trick. Whilst magical secrets cannot be protected by the law, the moral code of practising magicians respects the innovator of any particular secret.	In most cases, intellectual property law does not protect magic methods. Most tricks rely on sleight of hand and knowledge of psychological principles, neither of which are patentable in the capacity that scientific methods and processes are.
Potential for disruption	Exposures provide ammunition for hecklers and saboteurs at the point of performance.	These individuals will damage performances either way. A good performer should be able to cope with this.
Harms new magicians	It is the simpler, cheaper tricks that young magicians rely on, which are most likely to be exposed. Exposure also encourages experienced magicians to avoid discussing methods with newcomers for fear that their methods will be revealed.	Exposure aids new magicians by providing them with an easy, cheap source of new tricks.
Magic and criminality	The skills and secrets of a magician can be used to harm the public, by creative cheats and emotional persuasion. Exposure may furnish those with criminal intent the skills needed to attempt such deception.	Exposure allows members of the public to become more keenly aware of the possibility of deception, and how it works.

== See also ==
- Intellectual rights to magic methods
- List of magic tricks
- Magicians' Alliance
