= King levitation =

Levitation illusion

The King Rising levitation is a levitation illusion developed by and named after Corey King sold exclusively through Ellusionist. The King Rising was the first original magic effect to be released by the company, paving the way for many inventors to come. Some consider it to be a variation of the Balducci levitation.

== Effect ==
The performer is viewed from the side. The performer's legs may be covered (commonly with a jacket) at the beginning of the effect. At this point the performer may patter, saying something like, “You may have seen other magicians levitate behind a jacket...". This is a reference to the Superman levitation. The obstruction (jacket, etc.) would then be removed. The performer's whole body is clearly visible. The performer suddenly appears to levitate a few inches above the ground. Both feet are clearly seen to be in the air. The levitation usually lasts just a few seconds. When both feet return to the ground, the performer's legs may again be momentarily obscured. The performer may again make a comparative reference to the Superman levitation. Immediately afterwards the effect is complete, and the performer (particularly the performer's clothing) and the area around the performer can be thoroughly examined.

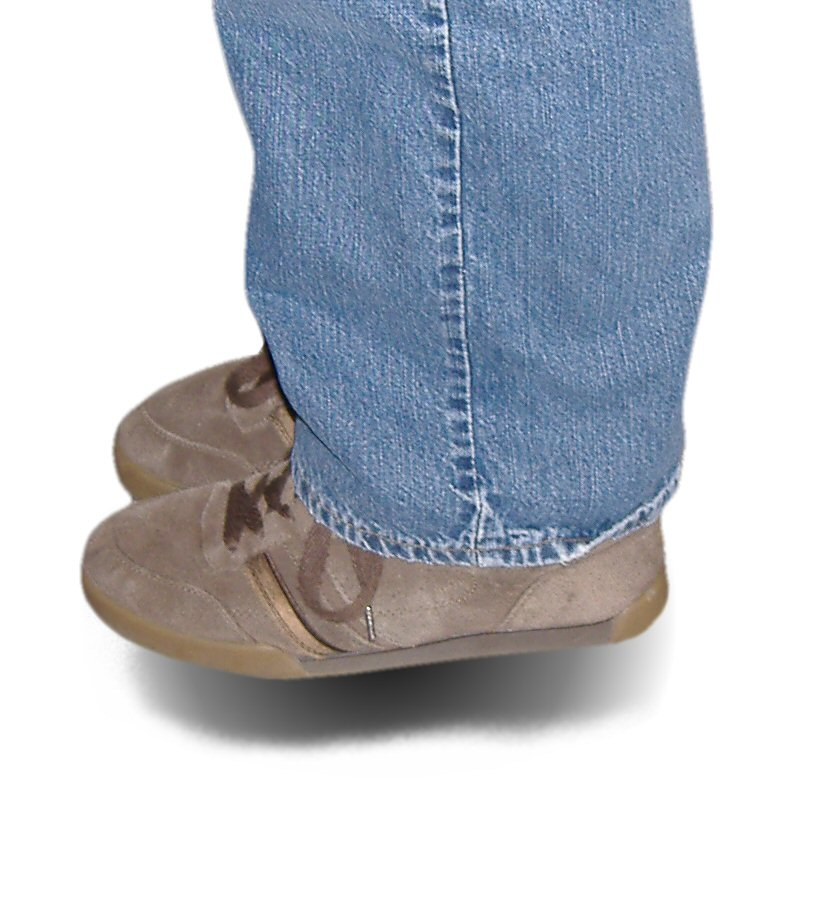
The King Rising levitation being performed

The biggest advantage of this levitation effect is that it is (like the Balducci levitation) impromptu. It can be performed anytime, anywhere, as long as the performer is wearing pants and shoes. It is more believable than the Balducci levitation because both feet are clearly seen in the air. However, it does require a small set-up that must be done under some kind of cover (an obstruction or misdirection). It is also considerably more difficult to perform than the Balducci levitation.

== Method ==
The performer stands so as to be viewed from the side. Under cover, the performer removes his or her foot from the far shoe and positions it at a right angle to that shoe, with the heel of the foot placed against the side of the shoe. After the obstruction is removed, the front of the performer's body can be seen. From the spectator's perspective it is impossible to tell that the performer's foot is out, because it is hidden by the leg closest to the viewers. The performer's weight is shifted to the leg, and the empty shoe is pinched between the angled foot and the shoe closest to the audience. The performer stands on the tip of the foot. Again, the foot remains hidden behind the shoes, which are both physically in the air, creating the impression of genuine levitation. To end the effect the process is simply reversed.

The key to this illusion is that the spectators assume that there is a foot inside of each shoe, which is a natural assumption. When both shoes are seen above the ground, it is then assumed that both feet are above the ground, and thus that the performer is levitating.

An obstruction is generally used to hide the performer's action of removing, and replacing the foot in its shoe. It is possible however to perform the effect without ever covering the legs, by using misdirection.

=== Alternative method ===
An alternative method, which is simpler and requires no preparation is to ensure that the spectators are positioned to one side of and behind the performer, so that they cannot see the offside toe. The performer simply uses the obscured toe to lift the offside heel and the entire nearside foot, giving the impression that both feet have lifted off the floor.

== See also ==
- Magic (illusion)
