= Steve Cohen (magician) =

American magician who specializes in parlor magic

- Born: February 1, 1971 (age 55); Yonkers, New York, United States
- Education: Cornell University (BA)
- Occupations: Magician, illusionist, writer, television host
- Known for: Parlor magic performances at the Lotte New York Palace hotel
- Height: 5 ft 8 in (173 cm)
- Website: www.chambermagic.com

Steve Cohen (born February 1, 1971) is an American magician who specializes in parlor magic. Sometimes called the "millionaires' magician", he performs regularly at the Lotte New York Palace Hotel in Manhattan and at private parties in other places.

== Biography ==
Steve Cohen was born in Yonkers, New York on February 1, 1971, and raised in Yorktown Heights and Chappaqua in the northern portion of Westchester County, New York. He attended Horace Greeley High School in Chappaqua and Cornell University, and also participated in a foreign exchange program at Waseda University in Tokyo. He is fluent in the Japanese language, and has attained Level One certification in the Japanese Language Proficiency Test. Since 1997, the Japanese magic manufacturer Tenyo Co, Ltd. has appointed Cohen to translate the instructional booklets for their international line of magic products from Japanese to English.

Cohen lived in Tokyo for five years, where he worked as a society entertainer at the Park Hyatt Tokyo hotel in Shinjuku. For the last two years of his stay in Tokyo, Cohen entertained guests weekly at the New York Bar & Grill, the setting of Sofia Coppola's film Lost in Translation.

In 2005, HarperCollins published his first book, Win the Crowd: Unlock the Secrets of Influence, Charisma and Showmanship in which he highlights the psychological secrets of magicians and how people can use these secrets in their everyday lives. The book has been translated into seven languages, including Turkish, Japanese, Spanish, Korean, and Indonesian.

Cohen holds the rank of MIMC (Member of the Inner Magic Circle) with Gold Star, awarded by The Magic Circle in London.

Cohen regularly presents his Chamber Magic show at the homes and events of wealthy individuals, with notable hosts including Warren Buffett, Michael Bloomberg, Barry Diller, Martha Stewart, Jack Welch, Michael Eisner, Stephen Sondheim, André Previn, Anne-Sophie Mutter, and the Crown Prince of Saudi Arabia.

Cohen starred in, and as a co-executive, produced Lost Magic Decoded, a two-hour documentary that premiered on the History Channel on October 18, 2012.

== Work ==
=== Chamber Magic ===
Chamber Magic has been presented by Cohen since April 2001; its creative director is magician, author and positioning expert Mark Levy. The show's title was inspired by the term chamber music, the intimate form of classical music typically performed in sophisticated and smaller venues. Cohen has recreated the intimacy of 19th century parlor magic performances by performing in the close quarters of a private suite. His show is strongly influenced by the Viennese magician Johann Nepomuk Hofzinser (1806–1875), the father of parlor magic, who entertained an elite audience of invited guests three or four times a week. Chamber Magic shows are held five times weekly, previously in the Waldorf Astoria, now at the Lotte New York Palace Hotel, but have also been presented for public groups at The Willard InterContinental Washington (District of Columbia), Beverly Wilshire Hotel (Los Angeles), Drake Hotel (Chicago), Beau-Rivage (Geneva), Langham Hilton (London), Four Seasons (Houston), Harvard Faculty Club (Boston), and the Ritz Carlton (San Francisco).

=== Miracles at Midnight ===
In March 2009, Cohen launched a show titled Miracles at Midnight which is billed as the world's most exclusive magic show. Audiences are limited to only twenty guests, and the show is held only once monthly, at midnight on the last Saturday of each month. Like Chamber Magic, this presentation also takes place in a private suite at the Waldorf Astoria.

=== Theater of Wonder ===
On January 12, 2012, Cohen debuted his stage show Theater of Wonder at Carnegie Hall in New York City. The two-hour solo performance was the first magic show to appear in the famous music hall in 38 years. The performance took place in the 268 seat Weill Recital Hall.

=== Lost Magic Decoded documentary ===
Cohen created, starred in and co-executive produced a two-hour television special for The History Channel, titled Lost Magic Decoded. The special premiered on October 18, 2012 to critical acclaim. In Lost Magic Decoded, Cohen traveled across three continents to locate vintage magic tricks that have not been seen for hundreds of years. Amongst others, he demonstrated such classic tricks as: The Turk (a chess-playing automaton), Think-a-Drink (a kettle that pours any beverage called for), the Light and Heavy Chest, the Indian rope trick, and the Bullet catch.

=== Confronting Magic art book ===
In collaboration with Assouline Publishing, Cohen released an art book in January 2021 titled Confronting Magic, a retrospective of his twenty-year public career. The book's foreword was written by film director Guillermo del Toro.

== Television appearances ==
Cohen has appeared on numerous talk show and news programs, including Late Show with David Letterman, CNN, Martha Stewart Living, CBS Sunday Morning, The History Channel, The Morning Show with Mike and Juliet, The Richard and Judy Show, and Night Talk on Bloomberg Television.

== Awards ==
Steve Cohen was awarded the 2024 Performing Fellowship from the Academy of Magical Arts, at the Magic Castle.

He has also received the 2019 Allan Slaight Sharing Wonder award and the 2019 Masters Award from the Milbourne Christopher Foundation.
