= Intellectual rights to magic methods =

Whether magic is intellectual property

Intellectual rights to magic methods refers to the legal and ethical debate about the extent to which proprietary or exclusive rights may subsist in the methods or processes by which magic tricks or illusions are performed. It is a subject of some controversy.

On one side, many magicians argue that methods represent "intellectual property" and that publication or sharing of methods should be subject to strict codes developed by magicians' organizations. On the other side, a range of people argue that publication of information about methods should not be subject to restrictions because knowledge should be freely available. The sharing of magic methods with non-magicians or the open publication of methods is referred to in the magic community as "exposure".

== Possible legal protection ==
There are a number of areas of law that might provide a basis for magicians to claim ownership of certain pieces of knowledge and to prevent exposure. Copyright, patent, trade secret and trademark law, are the primary sources of legal protection at issue on the topic. Each type of protection has its own limitations and loopholes.

=== Copyright ===
Under the Berne Convention, member states are free to prescribe in their national legislation that copyright is automatically granted to a work only when it is "fixed", that is, written or recorded on some physical medium. In the U.S., copyright law only protects works that are fixed in a tangible medium of expression. Accordingly, some argue, the processes or movements required for a trick are not copyrightable within the U.S., but recordings, written descriptions, or photographs of such a performance may be copyrightable themselves.

The idea–expression dichotomy specifies that mere ideas are not entitled to copyright; only the expression of those ideas are granted protection. For example, if a magician writes a description of how a trick works, the description will generally be subject to copyright.

Another potential area of copyright protection for magic creators is through a choreography or pantomime copyright. This was successfully employed by Teller in 2014 in a case against Belgian entertainer Gerard Dogge, who had posted a YouTube video of an illusion called The Rose & Her Shadow.

Magic illusion inventor and magician Hessel Bos also registered a magic trick as a copyright with the United States Copyright Office (registration is not essential for copyright protection but it offers additional advantages for rights holders). Bos registered his tricks by describing every movement of the magic tricks via text and photographs and then submitted these documents to the copyright office. They were approved under the Performance Art section and a certificate of registration was granted. In September 2008 Bos successfully filed a complaint under the Digital Millennium Copyright Act against America Online to remove a video from their website.

=== Patents ===
An invention or process which facilitates the performance of a magic trick is potentially patentable in the U.S. However, applying for patent protection requires the public release of information about how the device or process works. Furthermore, when a patent is obtained, it can only be used to prevent a third party from making or using the subject matter of the patent. This prevents other magicians from performing the trick but cannot be used to prevent anyone from revealing how the trick works.

Notably, in 1938, R. J. Reynolds Tobacco Company was sued by magician Horace Goldin over an ad campaign which revealed one method for a Sawing a woman in half trick. The case was eventually dismissed by a federal court and Goldin then gave up on patenting his methods.

Examples of patented inventions for conjuring include:

- The Svengali card deck, patented by Burling Hull in 1909
- A device to perform the quick-change magic trick under U.S. patent 6,308,334
- The theatrical effect of Pepper's ghost from the 1800s
- John Gaughan's levitation apparatus, filed in 1993
- David Merlini escape artist's Hyberna -frozen in ice- effect, patent filed in 2001, for the method of "freezing" an alive being in a tank of water.
- Horace Goldin applied for a patent for Sawing a woman in half in September 1921 and was awarded U.S. patent number 1,458,575 on 12 June 1923. Although the patent blocked other magicians using his ideas it also aided people seeking to expose the method to the trick.

=== Trade secret and contract law ===
Magic methods are effectively forms of trade secret and share many characteristics of trade secrets in other business sectors. As such there is a significant body of law that falls under the headings of "confidentiality" and "contract law" that might be used to control or protect them. These measures can effectively allow a perpetual monopoly in secret information – i.e. it does not expire as would a patent or copyright.

A company or individual can protect their confidential information through non-disclosure contracts with employees or business associates. A magician might therefore ask a partner or fellow magician to sign a non-disclosure agreement before sharing magic methods. That contract could then be enforced through the courts. The terms of such contracts might be subject to constraints of employment law (for example including only restraint that is reasonable in geographic and time scope). As with law generally, there will be variations across jurisdictions.

Information which a magician has intentionally kept confidential and which is not in the public domain may also be deemed to have a legally enforceable quality of confidentiality. The exact legal definitions of circumstances in which such protection applies vary across jurisdictions, as do the remedies available.

== Court cases ==
Court cases provide the ultimate test for any of the possible rights outlined above and, indeed, often establish law in the form of case law. There have been a number of court cases in which magicians have sought to assert rights to magic methods and prevent publications or broadcasts. These include:

- 1920s–1930s: Horace Goldin was involved in many legal actions related to the Sawing a woman in half illusion, including a successful unfair competition claim in 1922 against the makers of a film that exposed the method, and an unsuccessful unfair competition claim in 1938 against the R. J. Reynolds Tobacco Company for exposing the secret in an advertisement for cigarettes. The latter case was dismissed because Goldin's 1923 patent on the illusion revealed its mechanism to the public.
- 1943: Charles "Think-a-Drink" Hoffman sued Maurice Glazer for violation of his copyright and trademark rights in his "Think-a-Drink" act. The Supreme Court of Florida upheld the trademark decision for Hoffman, but held that Hoffman's act was not "dramatic" enough to qualify for Copyright Protection under the 1909 definition.
- 1998: Joseph Harrison and a number of other magicians filed an unsuccessful class-action lawsuit against SF broadcasting and Fox Broadcasting for exposing the secrets to a number of illusions on their Masked Magician special. They sought relief for violation of the magicians' honor code under Louisiana's abuse of rights doctrine, but were denied because the doctrine only applies to contracts and property.
- 1998: André Kole tried to sue the makers of the Masked Magician television specials to prevent exposure of the Table of Death trick.
- 2007: Japanese magicians sued local TV networks for exposing coin tricks.
- 2014: Teller sued Gerard Dogge for copyright infringement. U.S. District Judge James Mahan sided with Teller.

== Codes of practice ==
The most effective protection against the public exposure of magic methods may be a matter of ethics or peer pressure. One of the largest societies of magicians in the world, the International Brotherhood of Magicians, has a Code of Ethics which states:

All members of the International Brotherhood of Magicians agree to oppose the willful exposure to the public of any principles of the Art of Magic, or the methods employed in any magic effect or illusion.

The Brotherhood advises that any individual who is a professional or amateur magician should be aware that "exposing" the methods of an illusion may result in damage to their relations among other magicians.

However, such codes don't extend to selling magic, though magicians consider the seller of a magic trick should prove that the purchaser intends to learn and perform the trick for others, thereby becoming a magician, rather than simply wanting to know how a magic trick is done out of curiosity.
