= Cortini =

Cortini is a surname. Notable people with the surname include:

- Alessandro Cortini (born 1976), Italian musician
- Davide Cortini (born 1977), Italian para-cyclist
- Eleonora Cortini (born 1992), Italian actress
