= Children's magic =

Form of entertainment for children

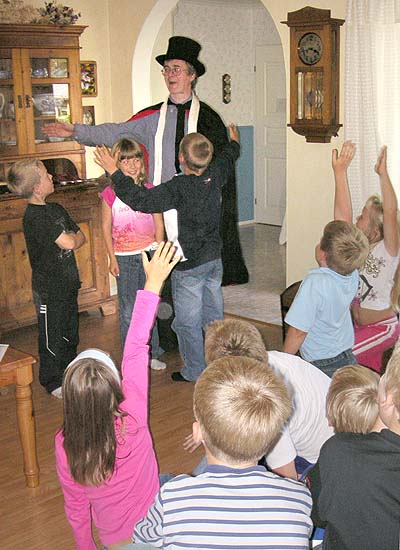
An amateur magician performing "children's magic" for a birthday party audience.

Children's magic is a specialized aspect of parlor magic and is meant to entertain children. It is typically performed at birthday parties, churches, preschools, elementary schools, Sunday Schools or libraries. It is often the only type of magic most Westerners experience other than that seen on television. This type of magic is usually comedic in nature.

A distinction should be made between Children's magic and "young magicians." The former is meant for audiences made up of mostly children while the latter refers to performers who are under-aged. The later has organizations dedicated to them including Society of Young Magicians, Magic Youth International and Young Magicians' Club.

Not every magician is interested in performing for children both artistically and in terms of patience. When Br. John Hamman, sm, was honored in 1995 during the first St. Louis Magical Heritage Awards, he explained in his acceptance speech the key to a successful magic performance:

"The object of magic is misdirection. Audiences are more apt to believe what they hear than what they see, and intelligent people are the easiest to fool because they don't expect me to use some childish gimmick to deceive them. On the other hand, children are hard to fool, because they watch closely and don't listen." (bold letters added)

Since children do not have the social filters adults have in such situations, they have no compunction against pointing out every error or inconsistency a magician makes during his performance. This makes performing for children exceedingly difficult.

Children's magicians often use certain gambits while performing for children. Some performers use their knowledge to intentionally misdirect the children in a given audience. One form of this type of misdirection is referred to as "Magician-in-Trouble" wherein a performer pretends to have made a mistake.

The style used for children's magic is often comical and frequently uses props that are large and colorful. It is not uncommon for magicians to dress as clowns or in wild and outlandish costumes while performing.

Generally, children's magicians are reluctant to use tricks that focus on the use of playing cards, however magic with coins (see Coin magic) or paper money are frequently popular with children. Movement and action are preferable to patter. Buffoonery is a better vehicle than "mystery" for children.[1] These performers commonly use as many audience members as impromptu assistants as possible.[1] Common Children's Magic Props include: Run Rabbit Run, Hip Hop Rabbits, Change Bag Routines, Breakaway Wand, Tipsy Turvy Bottles, and Spongeballs. Older children (from 7 upwards) tend to have a far greater logic and less traditional and more innovative magic effects can be performed.
