= Balducci levitation =

Levitation illusion

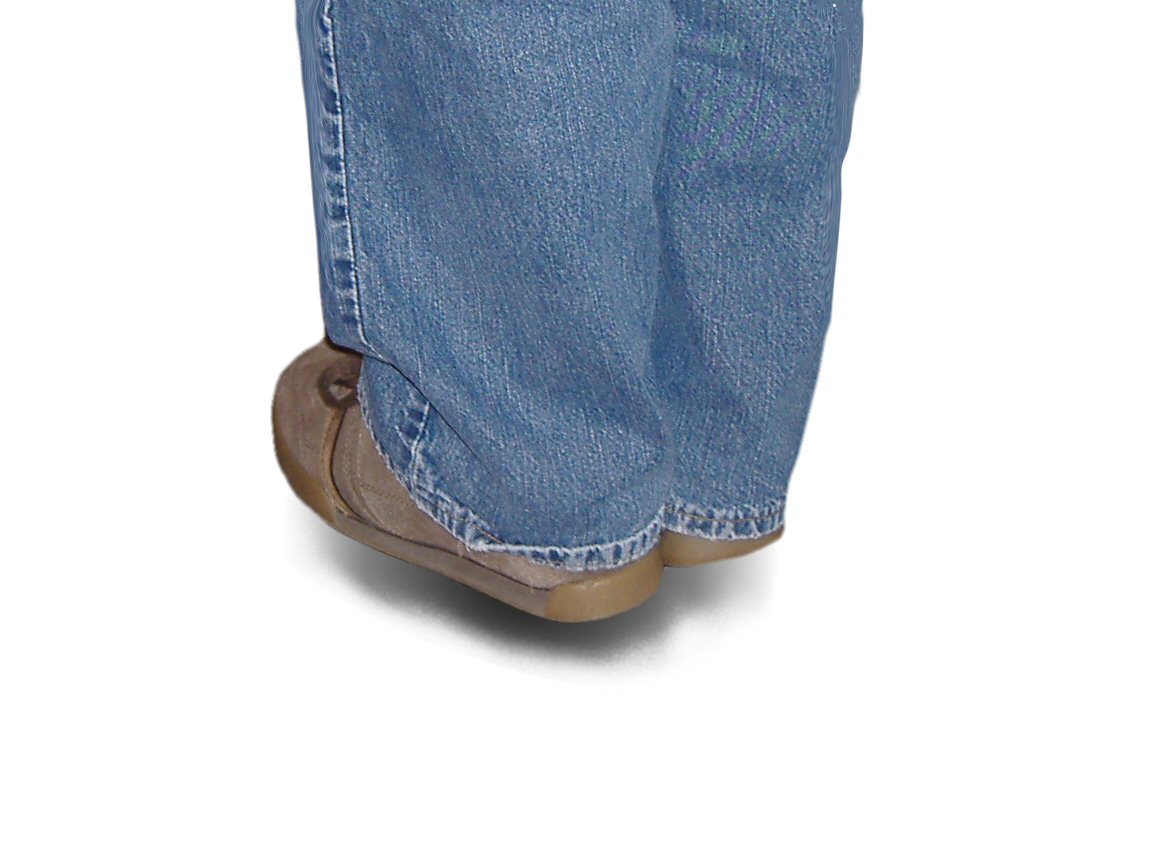
Artist's rendition (with background removed) of Balducci levitation

The Balducci levitation is a levitation illusion first described by American magician Ed Balducci. Its inventor is unknown. It is an impromptu magic trick, which has been popularized by many magicians, such as David Roth, Paul Harris, and David Blaine.

== Effect ==
The performer stands at an angle facing away from the spectators. The performer appears to levitate a few inches above the ground. The effect generally does not last for more than five seconds. The performer's feet return to the ground, and the effect is complete.

== Advantages and disadvantages ==
Other methods of levitation allow for greater heights, longer durations, and better viewing angles (see definition of angles from List of conjuring terms) for performance; however, most of these methods can only be performed on a stage because they require special equipment or setups (such as wires). The Balducci levitation requires no preparation of any kind, and so it can be performed impromptu – anytime, anywhere. Although variations have been made to improve the illusion of genuine levitation, they are generally harder to perform, and some require gimmicks or setups that make them less practical than the Balducci levitation.

== Misdirection ==
Like many magic effects, this illusion relies mostly on subtle misdirection and acting on the part of the performer.

These psychological subtleties increase the probability that spectators will believe the illusion:

- The spectators are informed ahead of time the performer intends to levitate.
- The performer pretends to put a good deal of care in choosing a place to perform the levitation.
- The performer acts as if performing the levitation is difficult and physically straining.
- The performer emphasizes the fact that there are no gimmicks (wires, etc.) used, and encourages that the area and the performer's clothing be examined.
- The performer provides a reason for the audience's position: a warning he may fall and require them to catch him.

These physical subtleties make the levitation seem more amazing:

- The spectators are misdirected from the performer's method because they are concentrating on the movement of the feet and the space that appears between the feet and the ground.
- When "landing", the performer will make a point of hitting the ground hard with the feet, and bending the knees to convince the spectators that the performer's feet were higher in the air than they actually were.

The effects of these subtleties can be seen in David Blaine's television performances of this illusion. For example, one spectator is asked how high Blaine levitated. She gestures a height that is obviously a few inches higher than the illusion is capable of producing, demonstrating that subtleties can often cause a spectator's interpretation of an effect to be better than the effect itself.

== Method ==
The magician positions themself at an angle to their audience, a little distance away, in such a way that the audience can only see the rearward portion of one foot and most of the other foot – concealing the toe end of the "far" (upstage) foot. The audience group must be small enough that they can be grouped close together. The magician, with the rearward portion of their feet held together, lifts the "near" foot off the ground, standing on only the front part of their "far" foot (the one which is partially concealed) while lifting the rearward part of the "far" foot and all of the "near" foot and keeping their ankles together. The audience sees only one foot and the heel of the other (the "far" foot), which appear to rise off the floor. The hidden part of the "far" (upstage) foot supports the weight of the magician as they appear to levitate one or two inches.

Simply put: the magician stands on the front of one foot, while raising the one foot and the visible part of the other foot, blocking the view of the front of the supporting foot with the other foot and rear part of the supporting foot.

The reverse Balducci illusion is similar to the Balducci illusion, but the magician faces towards the audience at a 90-degree angle rather than facing away. The magician slowly stands on the heel of their "far" foot as they lift the "near" foot and the front of the "far" foot. To improve the appearance of the effect, the magician will try to maintain the near foot parallel to the ground.

Another variation that is sometimes shown on TV shows is done by performing a normal "Balducci", filming the audience reaction, then later returning and performing the illusion with the aid of wires to get more height or to get a shot from the front or underneath. These shots will be edited into the footage of the original performance, thus allowing the levitation effect to be exaggerated, while still using genuine onlookers in the shot.

There is a principle in theatrical magic that "the audience will often remember or describe an exaggerated effect" – so the audience members may not notice the increased height caused by the "faked second shot" (if the additional height is not more than a few extra centimeters) when watching the combined footage later, believing that they are seeing a genuine recreation of the performance. This is even more likely if, during the original performance, cameras are positioned in the same place as those from which the "faked" footage was later shot.

== History ==
Ed Balducci published the first known description of the illusion in July 1974 in The Pallbearer's Review (Volume 9, Number 9, pp 755) under the name "Impromptu Levitation". Balducci ended his description by saying, "Originator unknown. It was shown to me many years ago by one of the Harmonicats, a cousin of mine, Erwin Levine, known as the Baron."

Despite Balducci's disclaimer, the illusion has since been known as the "Balducci levitation".

== Known variations ==
- Antigravity boots by Peter Marvey
- King levitation by Corey King
- Criss Angel's Levitation by Criss Angel
- Sooperman by Paul Harris
- Zero Gravity by Mike Bent

== Appearances in popular media ==
- The "Reverse Balducci" is performed by Wade's crew members in the film You Got Served.
- The "Reverse Balducci" is performed and mentioned by name in issue 25 of the comic book series Y: The Last Man.
- Hotel Babylon S3E7 features a character (Dan Black) loosely based on David Blaine, who performs the illusion in the lift; later one of the main characters (Anna) shows the other hotel staff (but not the viewer) how the illusion is performed.
- In the movie John Dies at the End, when Dave goes to a party and hears a girl gasp that a man just levitated off the ground, he asks how high and scoffs, "Let me guess, about six inches above the grass right? Balducci levitation?"
- In House S8E18, Dr. Gregory House performs the illusion for his team after they tell him they witnessed a patient levitating over his hospital bed.
- Bridget Christie performs Balducci Levitation in Taskmaster S13E2 outtakes.
