= Ostrów, Przemyśl County =

Ostrów
- Village
- Location within Poland
- Coordinates: 49°47′44″N 22°43′8″E
- Country: Poland
- Voivodeship: Subcarpathian
- County: Przemyśl
- Gmina: Przemyśl
- Population: 1,400

Ostrów [ˈɔstruf] is a village in the administrative district of Gmina Przemyśl, in Przemyśl County, Subcarpathian Voivodeship, in south-eastern Poland, near the border with Ukraine.
