= Former Chicago Historical Society Building =

- Old Chicago Historical Society Building
- U.S. National Register of Historic Places
- Chicago Landmark
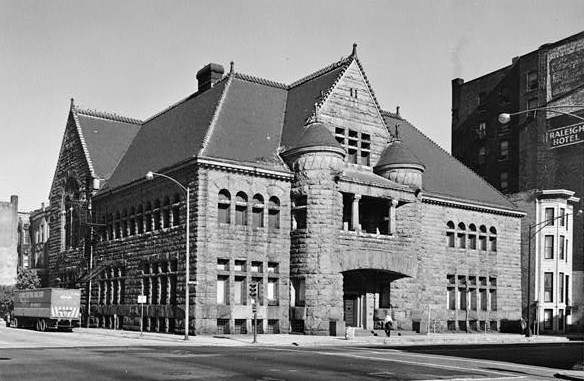
- HABS image from 1963

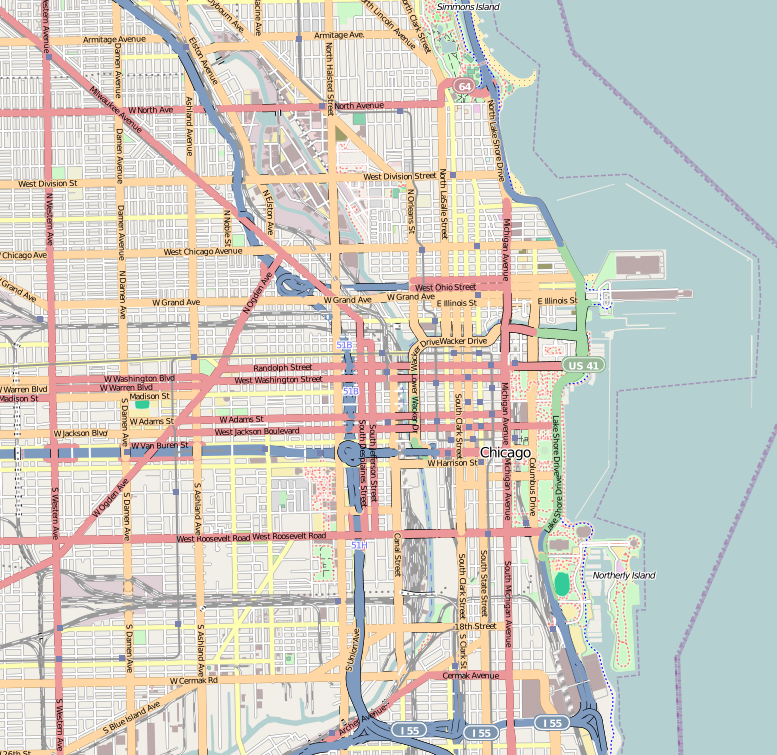
- Location within Central Chicago Location within Illinois Location within the United States
- Location: 632 N. Dearborn Street; Chicago, Illinois
- Coordinates: 41°53′36.92″N 87°37′47.85″W
- Built: 1892
- Architect: Henry Ives Cobb
- Architectural style: Romanesque, Gothic
- NRHP reference No.: 78001126

Significant dates
- Added to NRHP: November 28, 1978
- Designated CHICL: February 26, 1997

The Former Chicago Historical Society Building is a historic landmark located at 632 N. Dearborn Street on the northwest corner of Dearborn and Ontario streets near downtown Chicago. Built in 1892, the granite-clad building is a prime example of Henry Ives Cobb's Richardsonian Romanesque architecture. Henry Cobb designed this home for Walter Loomis Newberry, founder of the Newberry Library in Chicago. The building was designated a Chicago Landmark in 1997. It was listed on the National Register of Historic Places in 1978, under the name, Old Chicago Historical Society Building.

The building was the home of the Chicago Historical Society after its original headquarters burned down in the Great Chicago Fire, and prior to its relocation to Lincoln Park in 1931. Afterwards, the building housed a magazine publisher, the Works Progress Administration, the Loyal Order of Moose, the Chicago Institute of Design (1946–1956), and recording studios (1950s and 1960s). Since 1985 it has been the location of a series of nightclubs, and presently is the location of Tao Asian Bistro's Chicago location.

== Nightclubs ==
From 1985 to 1989, nightclub entrepreneur Peter Gatien operated The Limelight nightclub in the building, one of his chain of nightclubs under that name; at some point he bought the building. In January 1989, Gatien sold the building to Fred Hoffman for $3.5 million. Hoffman spent $1 million renovating the building, and in 1989 opened Excalibur and Vision, two "sister clubs". At the time of their openings in 1989, the two clubs were the largest non-hotel entertainment facility in Chicago.

The northern portion of the building was Vision, which had its own entrance. Vision was a large multi-level, multi-room nightclub that catered to fans of hip-hop, trance, and or house music. Notable guests who played at Vision included Rihanna, MSTRKRFT, Moby, Paul van Dyk, Benny Benassi, Cosmic Gate, Armin Van Buuren, Tiësto, Gabriel & Dresden and Gareth Emery.

On April 24, 2001, it was reported that a waitress for Excalibur, Colleen Gallagher, was tipped $11,000 by a customer who had run up a $60 bar tab.

Excalibur and Vision closed in mid-2012.

On December 31, 2012, after six months of remodeling, the club was re-launched as "Castle Chicago". With a three million dollar remodel replacing decor, lighting, and sound systems, the multi-venue Castle contains three nightclubs, a restaurant, a lounge and a craft cocktail bar, as well as private party facilities.

The building was purchased by Four Corners Tavern Group Inc. in May 2014 and ceased operation as the Castle nightclub in early January 2015.

Most recently the Tao Group opened its signature Hybrid Asian Cuisine/ Nightclub in the location in September 2018.

== See also ==
- Chicago architecture
