= Levitation (illusion) =

Illusion is one in which a person appears to float in the air

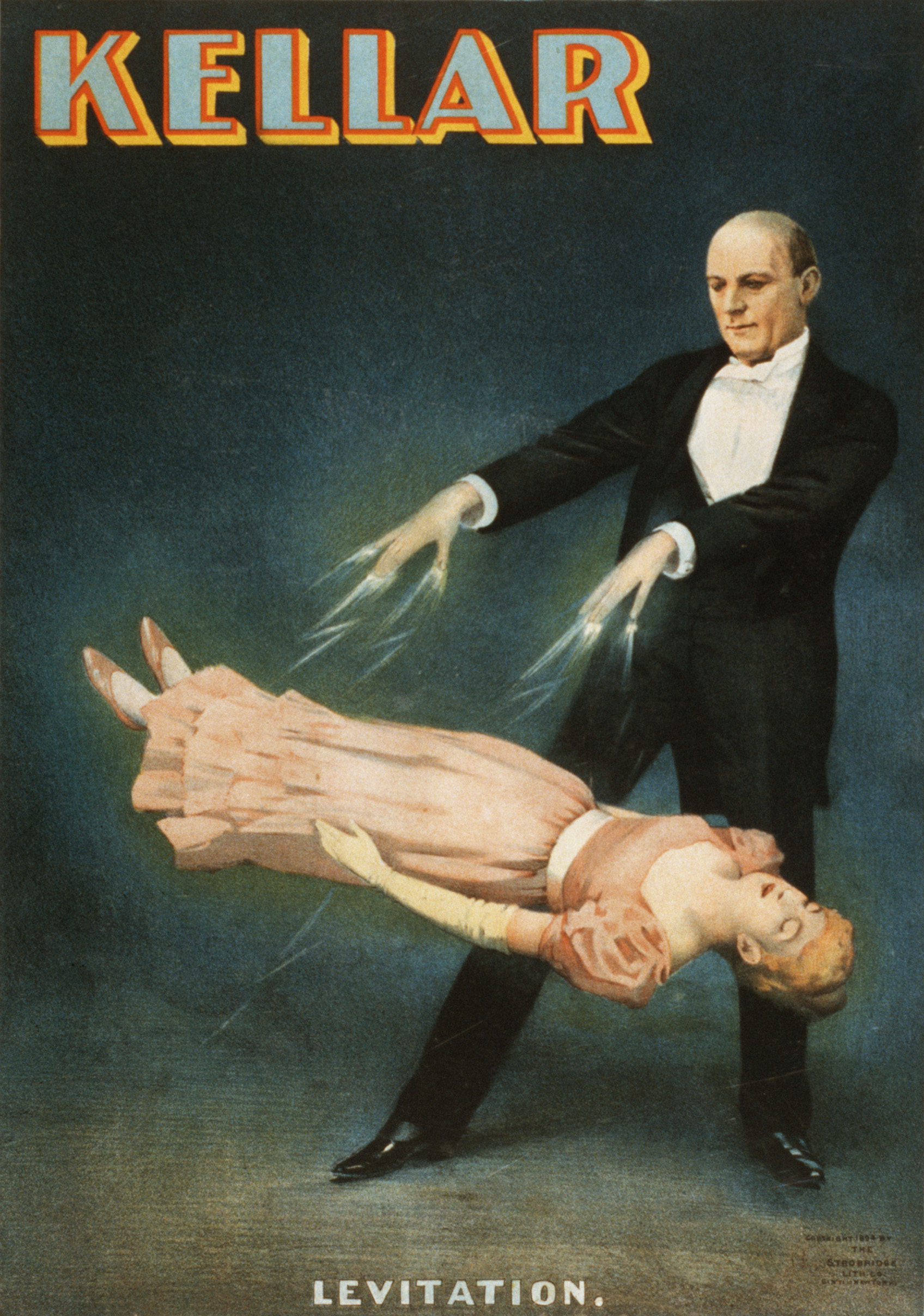
A poster for Harry Kellar's "Levitation of Princess Karnac"

A levitation illusion is one in which a magician appears to defy gravity by making an object or person float in the air. The subject may appear to levitate unassisted, or it may be performed with the aid of another object (such as a silver ball floating around a cloth) in which case it is termed a "suspension".

Various methods are used to create such illusions. The levitation of a magician or assistant can be achieved by a concealed platform or hidden wires, or in smaller-scale illusions by standing on tiptoe in a way that conceals the foot that is touching the ground.

== Of people ==
=== Asrah levitation ===
In Asrah levitation, an assistant lies down and is fully covered with a cloth. The assistant then appears to levitate beneath the cloth, before slowly floating down. As the magician pulls the cloth away, the assistant is seen to have vanished.

The trick uses a structure of thin wire that is placed over the assistant at the same time as the cloth. The wire structure can be raised while the assistant escapes unseen.

This illusion is credited to Servais Le Roy and was first performed with his wife as assistant in 1902.

=== Balducci levitation ===
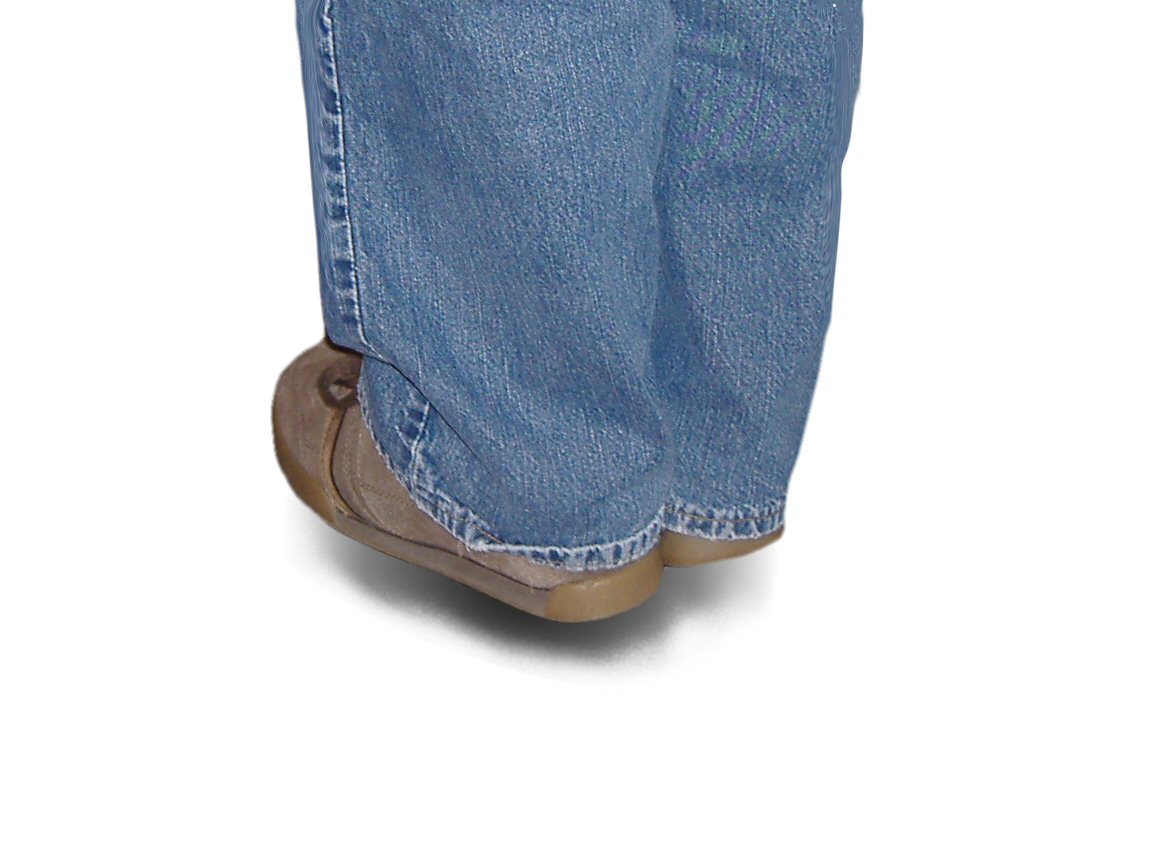
The Balducci levitation

The performer stands at an angle facing away from the spectators and appears to levitate a few inches above the ground. The effect generally does not last for more than five seconds. The performer's feet return to the ground, and the effect is complete.

The trick is performed by standing on the front of one foot, while raising one foot and the visible part of the other foot, blocking the view of the front of the supporting foot with the other foot and the rear part of the supporting foot.

This illusion was first described by Ed Balducci in 1974. Its inventor is unknown.

=== King levitation ===
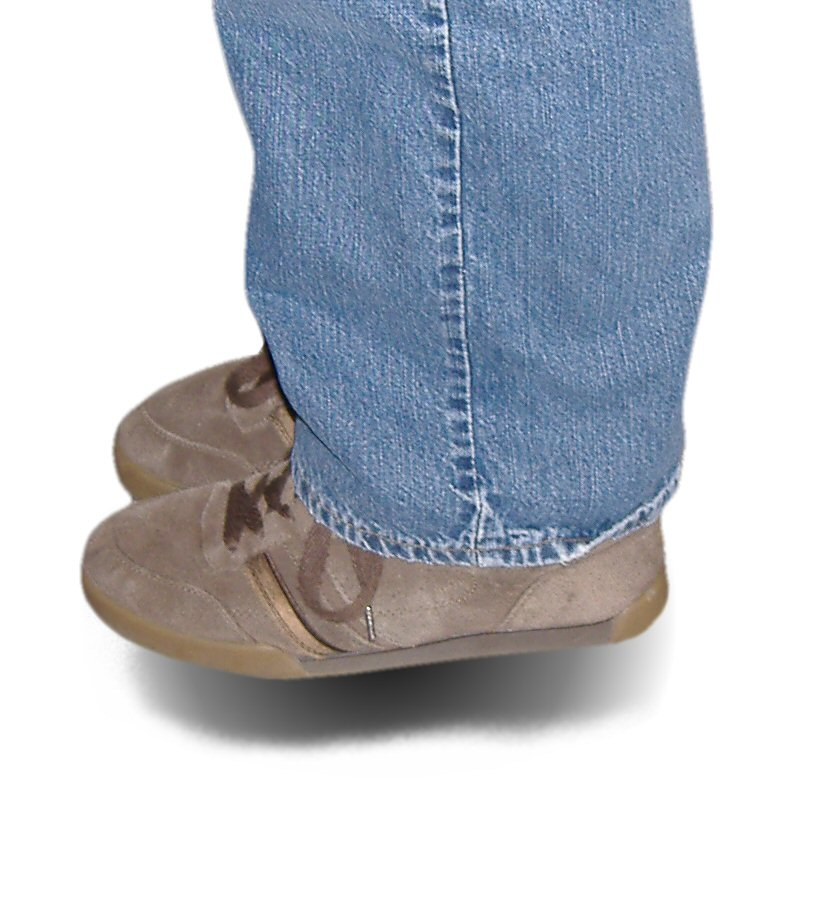
The King levitation

The performer is viewed from the side. The performer's legs are commonly covered for a moment at the beginning of the effect, perhaps by a jacket. The performer's whole body is clearly visible. The performer suddenly appears to levitate a few inches above the ground. Both feet are clearly seen to be in the air. The levitation usually lasts just a few seconds.

The trick is performed by removing the shoe furthest from the audience, and turning that foot 90 degrees away from the audience, with the empty shoe clamped between both feet. When the performer stands on the tip of the hidden foot, the two shoes are raised together, and the audience assumes that these are both of the performer's feet.

This illusion is also known as the King Rising levitation.

=== Chair suspension ===
The chair suspension is an illusion where a person appears to float in midair, supported only by the back of a fold-up chair.

=== "The Levitation of Princess Karnac" ===
Use of a goose-necked support bar to pass a hoop around a body in Harry Kellar's levitation illusion

American magician Harry Kellar performed a trick where his assistant, introduced as a Hindu princess, was brought onto the stage apparently sleeping on a couch. He would then levitate her, passing a hoop back and forth along her body to show that she was not being suspended.

Kellar supposedly developed this trick by abruptly walking onto the stage during a levitation show by John Nevil Maskelyne, seeing what he needed to know, and leaving. The Buffalo writer John Northern Hilliard wrote that the levitation was a marvel of the twentieth century and "the crowning achievement of Mr. Kellar's long and brilliant career."

The trick was done by having the assistant rest on a flat board concealed inside her dress, connected to a metal bar going out the side into the backstage which was hidden by the assistant's dress and the stage curtain. The other end of the bar was connected to a machine which could raise and lower the woman. To allow Kellar to "prove" with the hoop that she was floating, the bar was formed as a rough "S" shape, which would allow him move the hoop through the length of her body in either direction.

=== David Copperfield's flying illusion ===
Magician David Copperfield has performed an illusion in several magic shows since 1992 in which he appears to fly on stage for several minutes, while surrounded by audience members. During the trick, Copperfield flies acrobatically on the stage, performs a backflip in midair, and then has spinning hoops passed around him, supposedly to prove that he is not suspended by wires. Copperfield then descends into a glass box, which is covered with a lid, and continues to float inside it.

The method was created by John Gaughan, who described how the trick works in US Patent #5,354,238. The illusion utilises a series of wires controlled by a complex computer-controlled rig above the stage. In the glass box demonstration, the top of the box is threaded between the two sets of wires in a vertical position.

== Of objects ==
=== Blackstone's Floating Light Bulb ===
Harry Blackstone, Sr. was famous for performing a "Floating Light Bulb" illusion, in which an illuminated lightbulb – supposedly made by Thomas Edison – was produced and illuminated in Blackstone's hands with no visible means of power. The bulb would then be extinguished and levitated into the air, where it would be illuminated again, before being floated out over the audience, still lit. Dutch magician Hans Klok became the custodian of the illusion after the death of Blackstone, Jr.

=== Hummer card ===
The Hummer card is a levitation trick in which a regular playing card floats, hovers, spins and flies around the body of the magician in a seemingly impossible manner.

=== Fearson's floating cigarette ===
A trick in which a cigarette floats around the performer, moving from hand to hand before suddenly dropping down near the floor. As it moves up again it passes through a ring formed by the performer's fingers, as proof that there is no external support, and ends up in the performer's mouth.
