= Frank Eugene Eliason =

American illusionist, magician, and shadowgraphy artist

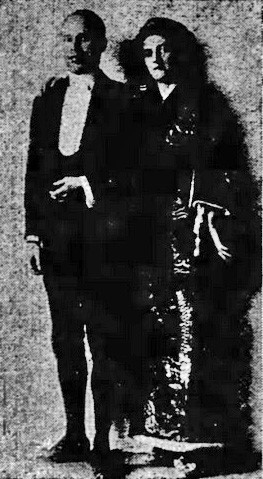
Frank Eliason and his wife Kathleen in 1911, performing as The Dantes

Frank Eugene Eliason (1878-?), was an American illusionist, magician, and shadowgraphy artist, who used stage names including Dante, Dante the Marvellous, and Frank Frazee.

== Early career ==
Born in Salt Lake City, Utah, on 9 January 1878, Franklin (Frank) Eugene Eliason was the son of Mormon pioneer migrants from Sweden, Olof Larsson Eliasson (1836-1920) and Ingar Emma Andersson (1838-1893). An elder brother, Oscar Eliason (1869-1899), who used the stage name Dante the Great, claimed that a maternal ancestor was the Scottish professional magician, John Henry Anderson, (1814-1874) known as “Professor Anderson” and the “Wizard of the North”, but produced no known evidence of a direct link.

After Oscar turned professional in about 1892, Frank began performing alongside him while he was still a teenager. One performance by Oscar in Salt Lake City in October 1894 included a segment by Frank, giving an exhibition in shadowgraphy, a form of entertainment involving the use of hand shadows that would become a mainstay of Frank's later career. Along with Oscar's wife, Virginia Edmunda Hammer (1873–1946), Frank was many times Oscar's assistant in his shows.

== On tours with Oscar and Edmunda Eliason ==
In 1897, Frank went on tour with Oscar and Edmunda to Cuba. The following year he joined the couple on a tour that began in Canada, then continued to New Zealand and Australia, where Oscar was promoted as Dante the Great. Frank continued to support his brother on stage during the tour. For example, in a “Simla Séance” act, he played the part of a medium who was purportedly helped by an Indian spirit called “Silverlight”. Audiences were left mystified how he was able to ring bells and blow harmonicas, despite appearing to remain securely tied inside a cabinet, with his mouth full of water. The Australasian tour was highly successful. Oscar received positive press reviews at virtually every stop of many along the way, with a record 101 performances at Sydney's Palace Theatre and a record 11 weeks at Melbourne's St George's Hall. He was on a “farewell” tour of New South Wales when he died after being accidentally shot in November 1899 near Dubbo.

In January 1900, Frank and Edmunda decided to comply with a dying wish expressed by Oscar for his show to continue, and went on a month-long tour to New Zealand, where Frank was promoted as Dante, brother to Dante the Great, with Edmunda as his assistant. Almost certainly without any basis, New Zealand press reports at the beginning of the tour claimed that Frank had taught Oscar the art of conjuring, and most of Oscar's main tricks were the work of Frank's “inventive brain”. Nevertheless, Frank had worked alongside Oscar long enough to know how to perform well, and the show received positive reviews. “While regretting the death of Dante the first, who made himself very popular in Auckland, we must express our satisfaction that his work is so ably carried on by Dante the second,” wrote one reviewer.

== Performances in Australia and Asia ==
Back in Australia, for several months Frank was engaged to perform “feats of magic and mystery” at a new entertainment complex in Adelaide called The Pantheon. In his shows, Frank reproduced tricks his brother had often performed with Edmunda, like “suspending” a woman in mid-air with no visible means of support. However, he also introduced shadowgraphy into the program. From Adelaide, Frank performed a season at Brisbane's Theatre Royal before beginning a period being a travelling performer across Australasia.

From 1901 to mid-1905, Frank would promote himself as Dante the Marvellous and mention in advertising that he was the “brother of the late Dante the Great”. Again, he reproduced many tricks previously performed by Oscar Eliason, including the famous “bullet catch”. and incorporated shadowgraphy. Frank managed to draw good audiences in many locations in Australia from 1901-1904 and then in New Zealand in the first half of 1905. But despite touring for longer, he was never as successful as his brother had been.

Throughout his Australian tour, advertisements for Frank's shows always stated that he was assisted by a “Mademoiselle Camille”. Her identity was not disclosed, but she may have been Sydney-born Elsie Kathleen Caldwell (1882-1914), who travelled overseas with Frank and married him in Madras (now Chennai) in southern India in December 1906. Frank had been performing in India as Dante the Wonderful after putting on shows in Manila and Shanghai that included shadowgraphy. In the western Indian city of Pune, he was reported to have been hospitalised with “enteric” (typhoid fever) before he proceeded to Rangoon and the British Straits Settlements. Frank and his wife, apparently preferring to use the name Kathleen, also went to Manila before sailing to the US from Yokohoma in Japan in June 1909.

== On tour in the US with The Dantes ==
When Frank returned to the US with Kathleen, they would begin touring as The Great Dantes, English Wonder Workers. A major component of their show would be derivations of the “Simla Séance” that Frank had performed many times with his brother. At first, they called it an “Australian Simla Séance” but soon changed it to a “Fujiyama Séance”. According to one reviewer, the act presented by the “mysterious” Dantes was “weird, creepy and beyond even the investigative curiosity of stage hands and house attaches”. Another reported that the Dantes’ show was “a continuous source of wonder”. Years later, fellow American magician Eugene Laurant (1875-1944) would pay tribute to their performance. “It was a beautiful act, thoroughly mystifying,” he wrote. “Even today I can say I have never seen the Séance more artistically presented.”

== As a solo shadowgraphy artist ==
In late 1910, Frank appears to have begun using the stage name “Frank Frazee” as a solo shadowgraphy artist. It was a name that he would keep using for more than a decade, perhaps for the rest of his life. Often at this time he presented his shadowgraphy as part of a vaudeville company. At the Nesbitt Theatre in Pennsylvania in January 1912, for example, he was described as “the human picture machine” who was presenting a cartoon offering in a variety program. Later that year, he made a brief Canadian tour. By then, Frank and Kathleen had given up performing together as the Dantes. They had apparently been living in San Francisco when, at the age of 29, she died in January 1914.

Frank continued with shadowgraphy performances after Kathleen's death, but perhaps demand for his act dwindled as moving pictures became more popular, and he also got a job as a day watchman for the New York printing press manufacturing company, R. Hoe & Co. During World War I, Frank was drafted into the US Army in 1917 as Frank Eliason Frazee. In April 1919, in New York, he married Margaret E. Gordon (1884-?) from Grantown-on-Spey, in the highlands of Scotland. About two years later, Frank was performing in a vaudeville show in New York when he fell, fracturing his skull, and was taken to hospital in a serious condition. This is the last known reference to Frank. His place and date of death has not been traced. Shipping passenger records show that Margaret Eliason-Frazee was still travelling between New York and Britain under that name at least until 1953, describing herself as a married “housekeeper”. However, it seems she always travelled unaccompanied and none of the known records gives any indication whether she was either widowed or divorced at the time. No record has been found of Frank having had any children.
