= John Wyman (magician) =

American magician

John Wyman Jr.
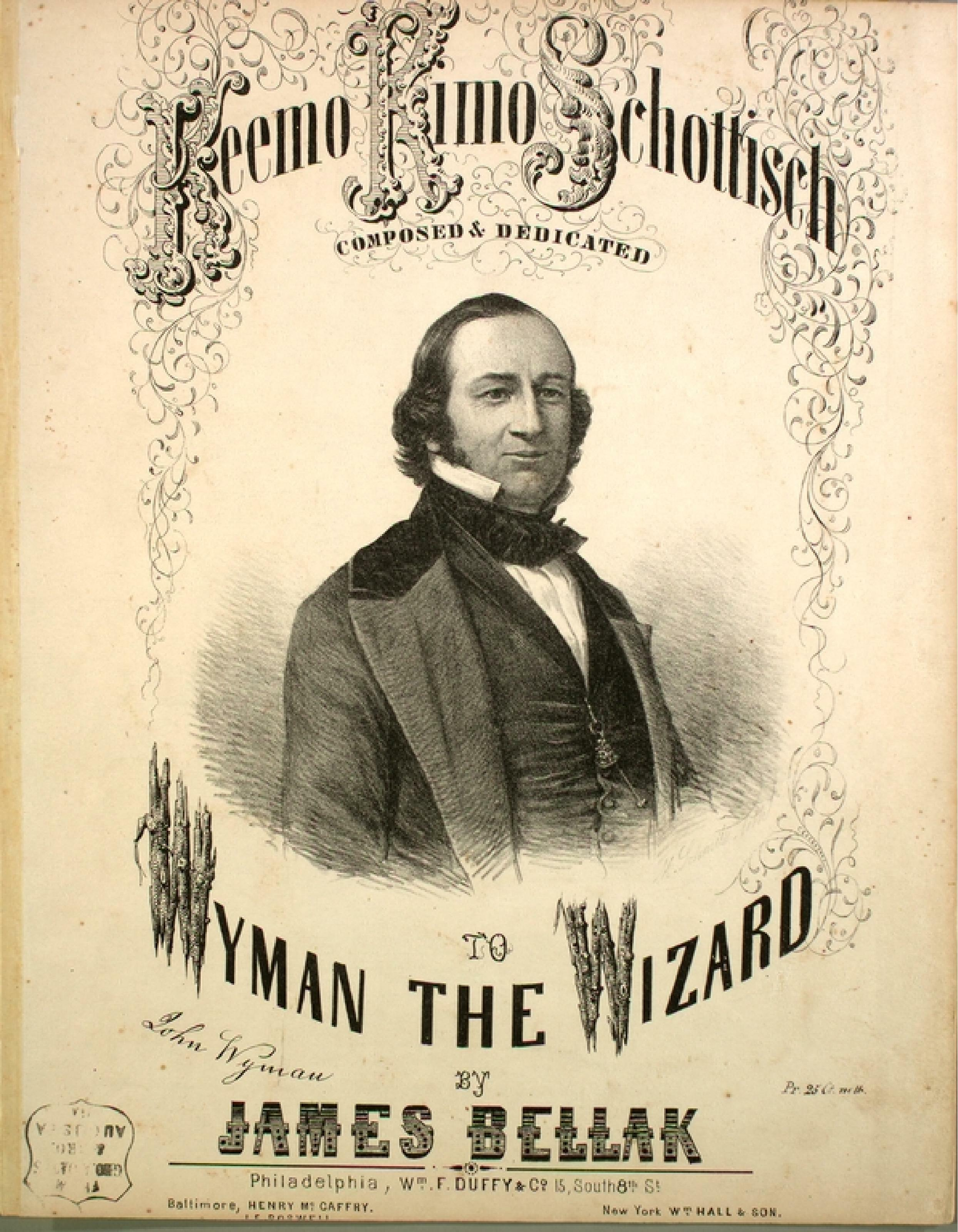
- Cover of musical composition by James Bellak dedicated to "Wyman the Wizard," 1854
- Born: January 19, 1816; Albany, New York
- Died: July 31, 1881 (aged 65); Burlington, New Jersey
- Other names: Wyman the Wizard

John Wyman Jr. (January 19, 1816 – July 31, 1881), known professionally as Wyman the Wizard, was a magician and ventriloquist who was popular in the United States during the mid-19th century.

== Biography ==
Wyman was born in Albany, New York. His father, a merchant, planned a business career for him, and after attending Albany Academy Wyman found work in a Baltimore auction house. His interest in magic and ventriloquism, however, led him to begin his performing career with a show at the Baltimore Museum. According to a possibly apocryphal account related to Harry Houdini, Wyman managed his own career and never had a manager except for a single 1850 appearance in New York City, managed by P. T. Barnum. However, other records indicate that he made his 1836 Baltimore debut under the management of Charles D. Selding, and for sixteen years was under the professional management of George Wood.

Wyman's early skills improved after a journey abroad, during which time he likely made purchases from Voisin's Repository, a shop in Paris which sold magical novelties. He also bought a number of techniques from the Scottish magician John Henry Anderson, including the secret to performing the "Magic Cauldron," "Nest of Boxes," "Aerial Suspension," "Inexhaustible Bottle," and "Gun Trick."

During his career, Wyman made a regular circuit of smaller cities and towns, which he tended to prefer over large cities. He is recorded as having performed at Lynchburg in 1855 and at Richmond in 1857, where he made use of a ventriloquist dummy and an "egg-bag." It was in 1857 that Wyman joined the committee convened to investigate the Fox sisters on behalf of the Boston Courier, eventually concluding that the sisters were fraudulent. Wyman also had the honor of performing for three U.S. presidents: Martin Van Buren, Millard Fillmore, and Abraham Lincoln. During his performance with Lincoln, Wyman produced an illusion by which several copper pennies were made to pass through the president's hand; those pennies are now among the collection of artifacts owned by David Copperfield.

Wyman apparently suspended his magical performances upon the outbreak of the Civil War and his assistant at the time, one Ebenezer Mason, enlisted with the Union Army Balloon Corps. He resumed his usual shows after the war. Historian of magic Henry R. Evans recorded fond childhood memories of seeing Wyman perform. In 1867, Wyman started doing "gift shows" as a promotional tactic. He would distribute prizes including Bibles, table sets, canes, silverware, and $40 watches to members of his audience, and unlike many of his contemporaries Wyman was scrupulously honest. On at least one occasion, Wyman gave away title to building lots in New Jersey as a grand prize.

Magic tricks attributed to Wyman include a "second sight" illusion, where he would describe objects hidden by a handkerchief (having secretly stolen a glance and rapidly memorized the contents), and an illusion where a borrowed watch was apparently smashed, but in actuality had been removed by an assistant to be discovered unharmed among the audience. His shows at one point included a pie-eating contest for children and a talking dog allegedly capable of 113 different tricks.

In his later years, Wyman lived at 612 North Eleventh Street in Philadelphia before moving to Burlington, New Jersey where he bought a country estate. He compiled a scrapbook chronicling his magic career which has since been lost. Wyman predicted his own death in July 1881, stating to his friend Thomas W. Yost: "You will not see me again. This is the last of Wyman." He died a few days later. Wyman had been performing magic up until about a year before he died.

John Wyman was married to Jane Wyman (née Prout), and much of their correspondence survives. He was buried in Fall River, Massachusetts among his wife's family.

Wyman was regarded highly by Harry Houdini and by Henry R. Evans, who chronicled his life. Both men considered him a talented magician but noted that he had largely faded from the popular consciousness by the early 1900s.
