= Inexhaustible bottle =

Classic magic trick performed by stage magicians

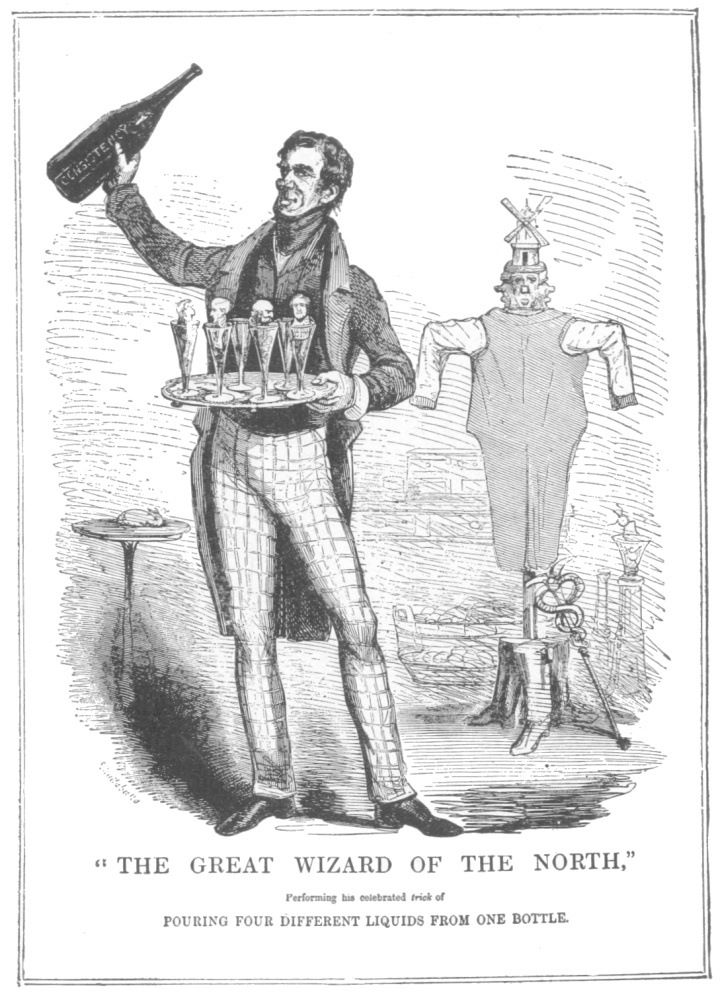
John Henry Anderson demonstrates the Inexhaustible Bottle trick on the playbill for an 1843 performance.

The Inexhaustible Bottle is a classic magic trick performed by stage magicians. It dates to the 17th century and has since inspired many variations; well-known examples include Any Drink Called For, The Bar Act, Satan's Barman, Assassin's Teapot and Think-a-Drink. During the temperance movement it became The Obliging Tea Kettle, and the modern Magic Tea Kettle remains a common prop available at most magic stores. A slight variation is the Magic Funnel. Today, the trick is normally performed for children, although some stand-up shows retain a variation.

== Effect ==
The magician produces a bottle or kettle and asks the audience to name any sort of drink: water, beer, tea, or any other liquid. The magician tips the bottle and pours out a glass of that drink. He then asks for another example, and another, with the bottle producing the drinks on demand, seemingly forever. At the end of the performance the bottle is broken open to reveal various objects. Kettles generally reveal a number of colored handkerchiefs inside, which are said to give the kettle its magical powers.

== History ==
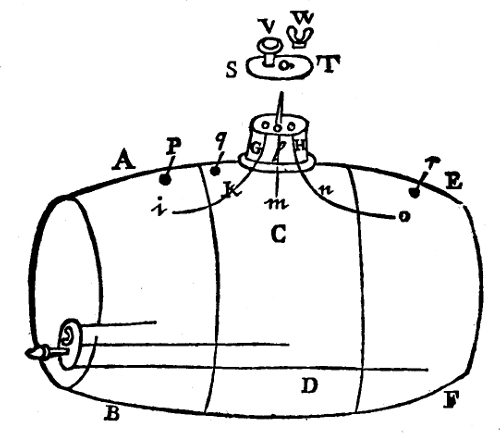
The earliest known example of the "Inexhaustible Bottle", described in 1635.

The trick has been dated to 1635, when it appeared in Hocus Pocus Junior: The Anatomie of Legerdemain in London. In this version, a barrel can produce three different drinks on command. Hocus Pocus Junior is a collection work, so the trick must be even older, but no earlier references are known. Harry Houdini found another early mention from 1707, and another in 1712 when part of the "famous water-works of the late ingenious Mr. Henry Winstanly" were demonstrated by his wife. By the late-18th century the trick was so well known that in 1780, John Theophilus Desaguliers used the trick to demonstrate hydrostatics. It remained a standard demonstration for the next century at least.

The barrel changed to a bottle in the early-19th century, when "Herr Schmidt" introduced "The Bottle of Sobriety and Inebriety" around 1821. The trick was next seen in London in 1835 by "Falck of Koenigsberg"'s "Infernal Bottle". Phillippe used a variety of this trick between 1836 and 1838. Phillippe's assistant, Macallister, claimed to have invented it. Similar acts were performed by many, including the well-known Ludwig Leopold Döbler, who is seen performing it on a poster in 1842.

When Jean Eugène Robert-Houdin of Paris arrived in London to perform, he found that almost all of his répertoire was being performed by Compars Herrmann at the Théâtre Royal. Nevertheless, Robert-Houdin continued to use the trick at his opening show on 1 December 1847, and heavily promoted himself as the trick's inventor. Henri Robin, a Dutch magician, took to the same act as well, performing Robert-Houdin's répertoire and likewise claiming that he had invented the inexhaustible bottle. Robert-Houdin's popular autobiography tipped the balance in his favour; physicists using the bottle to demonstrate hydrostatics were soon referring to it as the "Robert-Houdin bottle".

John Henry Anderson, the "Wizard of the North", had begun using the act while performing in Europe. A variation appears on advertising for a performance at the Victoria Rooms in Hull in April 1838. In 1849 he toured North America, where it was quickly copied. It spread so rapidly that it was soon available in toy shops across the country. The December 1880 issue of Scribner's Monthly mentions the trick dismissively.

Magicians looking to re-invigorate what was then a widely performed and well understood trick started to make modifications. Scribner's describes one version by "Senior Patrizio" where the performer is able to pour beer for everyone in the hall, along with a failed attempt by another would-be magician who changed this to champagne and ended up drenched head to toe.

A more common modification was introduced by English magician David Devant as "The Obliging Tea Kettle", at the suggestion of his wife. Kettles became a common variety of the act, and are widely used today. Devant explained the trick in detail in Secrets of My Magic.

Charles Hoffman, known as "Think-a-Drink Hoffman", performed one of the best known examples as a vaudeville act. His show used a small bar and a series of cocktail shakers which he used to produce any drink the audience asked for, up to eighty different drinks according to his own press materials. During Prohibition, he would produce alcoholic drinks at private shows, and became known as "The Highest Paid Bartender in the World".

By the late-1930s the same act had been copied by a wide variety of magicians, and in 1943 Hoffman sued a number of them, proceeding with a suit against Maurice Glazer. In a landmark 1943 ruling, the Supreme Court of Florida agreed that Hoffman held the trademark rights to the name "Think-a-Drink", but that the act itself was not entitled to protection. This has been used as a standard piece of precedent when discussing intellectual rights to magic methods.

== Method ==
The concept includes two different tricks, the original "any drink" where a single container can pour multiple drinks, and the "endless pour" in which a seemingly large or continuous amount of liquid is poured from a container that is too small to hold it.

=== Any drink ===
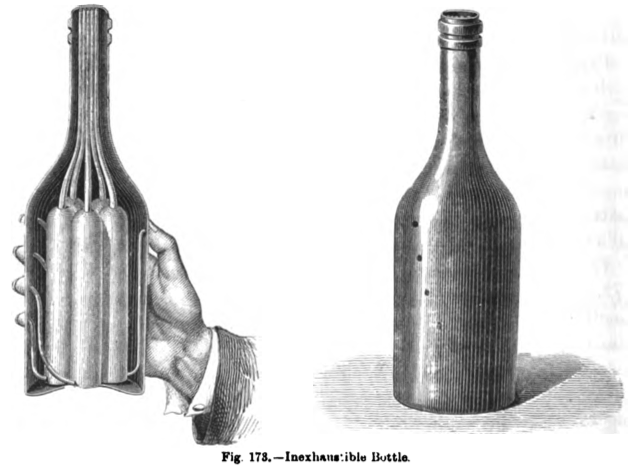
Privat-Deschanel's "Elementary treatise on natural philosophy" explains the use of the Inexhaustible Bottle as a way to cleverly demonstrate the basic principles of hydrostatics.

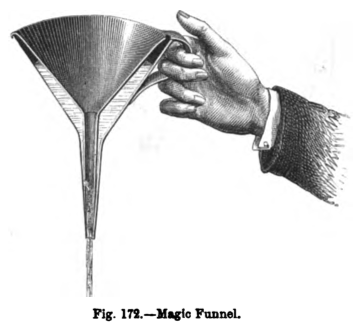
The Magic Funnel variation.

The original method from Hocus Pocus Junior was a single large barrel that is modified with internal baffles to create three sections. A single spigot on one of the flat ends of the barrel is extended with three pipes, one leading into each of the different partitions. The flow is controlled through a bunghole on the top that is likewise modified to run to three hoses, one into each partition. By turning the stopper in the bunghole to uncover one of the pipes, air can flow into the selected partition. When the spigot is opened, only the liquid from the selected partition can flow out, the partial vacuum in the other chambers prevents the flow.

The original "any drink" methods using bottles were similar to Hocus Pocus, simply on a smaller scale. Most variations used what appeared to be a bottle but was actually a tin container japanned (lacquered) green to appear like glass. The internal area is divided into sections and each one empties into a tube that ends just short of the neck. Very small holes drilled into the bottle allow them to be selected in the same fashion as Hocus Pocus, with the magician's hand holding the bottle so their fingers cover the holes; lifting one starts the pour. The tea kettle varieties simply moved the holes to the handle. A slight variation on the theme is the Magic Funnel, which uses a two-walled funnel holding liquid between the walls. The magician pours a small amount of liquid through the funnel as normal, but it continues to pour when they lift their finger from a hole on the handle.

A very different variation on the any drink method uses small packets of dried flavouring or color that can be dropped into the cups before the pour begins. "Think-a-Drink" used this at least for some performances, and prior to one show the seemingly dirty cups were polished by a stage hand and had to be re-prepared. In spite of Hoffman's attempts to protect the act, or perhaps because of it, this is now the basis for the simplest version, the Magic Tea Kettle. This version uses small beads of colouring that are dropped into the cup, preferably during the pour, and the container itself holds water. Most versions contain water only in the bottom of the kettle, the upper portion is a separate container that can be used for a reveal. Other versions may use various simple chemistry to produce the colors. These variations are simple to distinguish because the fluid coming out of the bottle is always the same color (normally clear), while the original method actually has different fluids inside.

=== Endless pour ===
The seemingly inexhaustible amount of liquid is even simpler; it relies on special "essence glasses" which appear about the size of an aperitif glass, but are mostly glass with little open space for the liquid. This not only helped the illusion (until lifted to the lips) but also reduced the cost of performing the act if the glasses were handed out. For very large audiences, sleight of hand can be used to switch bottles during the act; Modern Magic suggests doing this while calling for more glasses to be brought onstage.

Scribner's describes a very different method in which a beer barrel was placed under the stage and piped to a hole in the floor where it ended in some sort of coupling. The performer would walk to the hole and press their shoe onto the coupling to connect to rubber hosing running through his clothes to a bottle, where he would begin to pour.

Many acts added two flourishes. One was to rinse the bottle with water at the start of the act, which is accomplished simply by covering all of the holes and pouring water into the mouth. Unable to travel up the tubes into the bladders, it falls into the space between them and can be emptied back out the same way. Most acts also included an ending where the bottle was broken open. This was actually a cut line along the bottom of the "bottle" which could be pulled apart by applying a little effort.

== Physics ==
The inexhaustible bottle is a simple demonstration of hydrostatics, specifically Pascal's law. Pascal's law states that any pressure applied at any point in a continuous fluid is applied equally throughout the fluid. For example, if you squeeze the top of a disposable water bottle, the entire bottle inflates evenly. A corollary of Pascal's law is that a negative pressure is also equally distributed throughout the fluid, meaning that if one applies a partial vacuum at any point, the entire surface sees the same drop in pressure.

In the case of the inexhaustible barrel, the container has a very large surface area in comparison to the relatively small tube leading from the bunghole. When the tube is sealed and the pouring cock at the bottom opened, a tiny amount of fluid will drain out until a vacuum is produced in the tube. At that point the entire surface of the fluid is also under vacuum. The difference in pressure from ambient atmospheric at the spigot to the partial vacuum at the top of the liquid counteracts the force of gravity and the flow stops. To start the flow, the hole at the top is uncovered to allow air into the chamber, equalizing the pressure on the top and bottom. The inexhaustible bottle works identically in physical terms, and simply removes the spigot and uses the physical inversion of the bottle to allow flow when the finger holes are uncovered.

Modern magic tea kettle variations may or may not have a similar apparatus to control flow. Because the trick in this case takes place in the cups, not the kettle, there is no real need to control the flow. Nevertheless, most variations do include a similar finger hole to allow the magician to control the flow and create various pouring effects like streams of water that start and stop mid-pour.
