= Doc Cunningham =

American illusionist, stunt performer, and showman

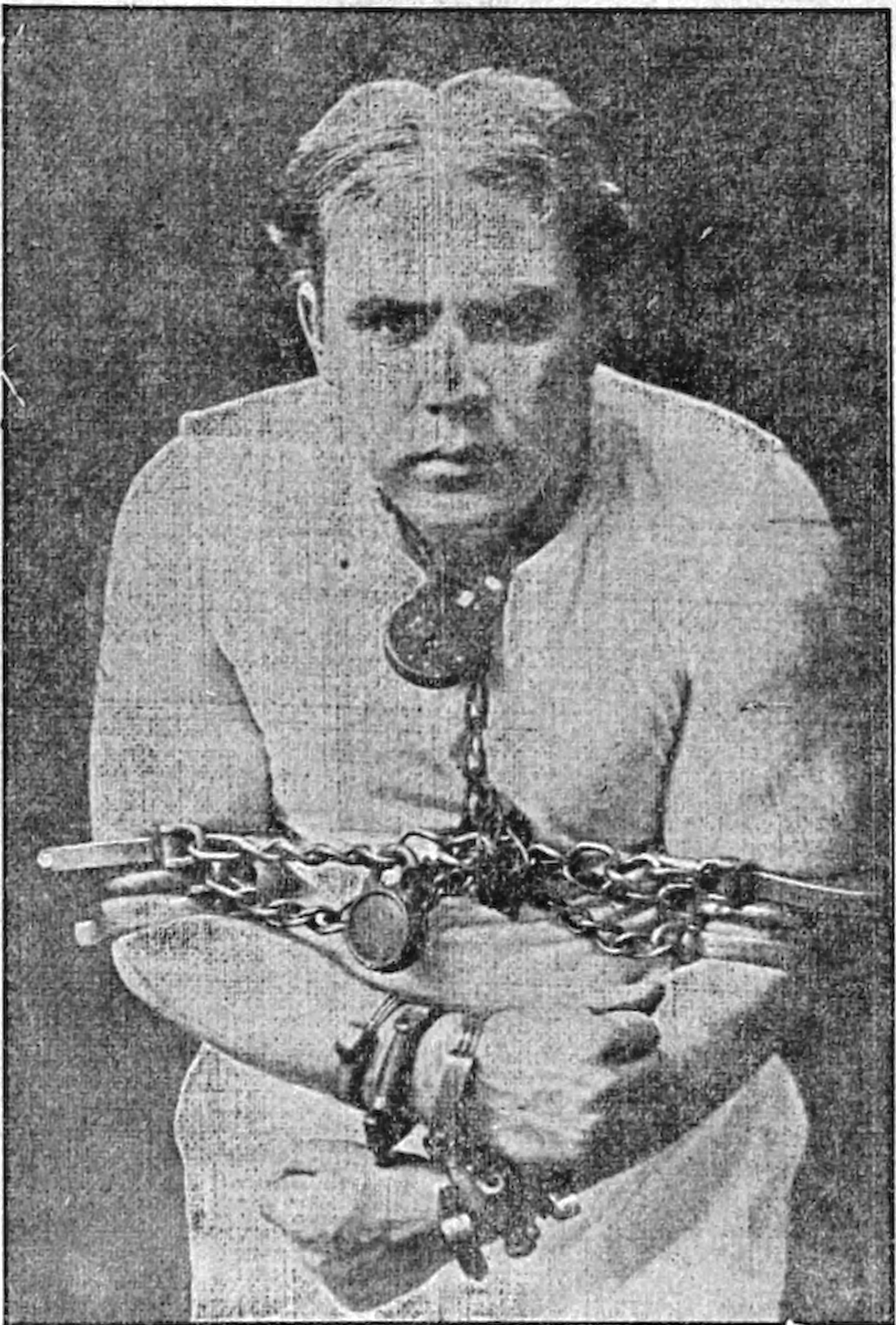
Robert "Bob" Cunningham, as Cunning The Jail Breaker

Robert Marion "Doc" Cunningham (1873–1951), was an American illusionist, stunt performer, and showman whose stage names included Zante, Cunning the Jail Breaker, Cunning the Handcuff King, Doc Cunning, The Mental Miracle Man, and Cunning the Supermind.

== Early career and Australasian tour ==
Robert (Bob) Marion "Doc" Cunningham was born in Provo, Utah, on 12 April 1873. He began public performances as a magician under the name Zante, perhaps mimicking the stage name of another prominent Utah-born illusionist, Oscar Eliason, who had achieved considerable popularity in the US and Australasia as Dante the Great. By late 1899, after touring Montana, Idaho and California, Cunningham was being compared to Eliason, who had recently been accidentally killed during a highly successful Australian tour. Cunningham was even performing the same “bullet catch” trick which had become one of Eliason's trademark acts. On his first tour beyond North America, Cunningham showed his respect for Eliason by visiting his grave and meeting his widow, Edmunda (born Virginia Edmunda Hammer), between performances in Sydney in April 1902. In Australia, advertisements for Cunningham's show declared him to be “America's greatest and most popular magician”, assisted by a company of “clever American vaudeville artists”. But Cunningham made an unfortunate decision to open his Australian tour in New South Wales, just as Oscar Eliason's younger brother, Frank, was making a tour of the same state as “Dante the Marvellous”. Days before Cunningham's tour began, one reviewer had labelled Frank Eliason as the “king of modern magic”, noting that he had been performing before large audiences. After less than a month, Cunningham left for New Zealand, blaming “especially slack” show business conditions in Australia for disappointing ticket sales. In New Zealand, Cunningham was again promoted as “America's greatest magician” in programs featuring a company of vaudeville performers. Though he was rarely top-billed, there he won acclaim as he focused on sleight-of-hand tricks, touring for most of the rest of 1902.

== Escape stunts and competition with Houdini ==
Soon after returning to the US from his Australasian tour, Cunningham began almost a decade of making escape stunts the focus of his performances, styling himself Cunning the Jail Breaker or Cunning the Handcuff King. His interest in escape acts had reportedly been sparked as a boy by his parents’ friendship with the county sheriff in Provo. Prior to his botched execution in 1879, convicted murderer Wallace Wilkerson had made a hole in the wall of the Provo Jail, and though he hadn't escaped, it had left a lasting impression on young Cunningham when he'd been allowed to crawl through it. Numerous times while on tour in the US in the early 1900s, he would urge local police to use their best handcuffs and other devices to secure him, then confound them by setting himself free. The resulting publicity helped boost ticket sales for Cunningham's stage act, in which he freed himself after having been shackled and handcuffed inside a locked steel cage, all the locks and other restraints having been carefully checked by audience members, often police officers. By early 1905, some reports were referring to Cunningham as a rival to the famous Harry Houdini (1874-1926) In one incident at Hurtig and Seamon's Music Hall in Harlem in May 1905, Houdini's elder brother, William Weiss, emerged from the audience and handed Cunningham a pair of handcuffs, challenging him to put them on and take them off within seven minutes. After struggling to open them, Cunningham declared them “fixed” and wouldn't return them. In an ensuing scuffle, Weiss was arrested and charged with disorderly conduct. One of Cunningham's managers, J. M. Howard, would later recall “a great deal of professional rivalry” between his client and Houdini. “If either used a new publicity stunt, the other would soon adopt it,” he stated. However, according to Howard, Cunningham did not have the diving and swimming skills to match Houdini's ability to free himself from under water while handcuffed and leg shackled. For several months in 1907, beginning in New York, Cunningham toured in a melodrama called “From Sing Sing to Liberty” by Harry Clay Blaney. According to one report, Cunningham's handcuff work was made “the feature of the play”. In 1908 he toured Mexico, still focusing on escape acts, but also performing sleight-of-hand tricks.

== Transition to mentalism and competition with Alexander ==
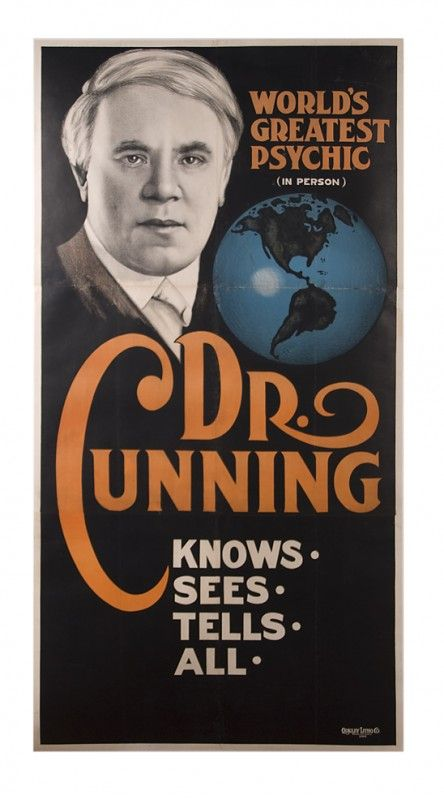
Poster of Robert "Bob" Cunningham as Dr Cunning the "world's greatest psychic"

While continuing to perform escape acts, and using the stage name Cunning, from 1909 Cunningham began a transition in emphasis in his shows towards mentalism. It appears that during the first stage of this transition, the probable source of many of his new ideas was Oscar Eliason's widow, Edmunda. Between 1909 and 1912, Cunningham's main on-stage assistant was identified only as “Mademoiselle Edmunda”, the same name Eliason's wife had used when she worked with him. His new assistant was described as the “psychic wonder of the world”. New acts that soon comprised a large part of Cunningham's show would mirror those commonly performed either by Eliason or his widow, including in her own shows after his death. These included making his assistant's body rise horizontally in mid-air with no apparent means of support, and demonstrations of purported “mind reading” and other mental powers. After parting from “Mademoiselle Edmunda”, for a time Cunningham went back mainly to escape acts but by 1916, he had resumed the move towards mentalism, appearing on the same programs as one of the best-known mentalists of the era, Claude Alexander Conlin (1880-1954), who performed as Alexander the Man Who Knows. Cunningham delivered a separate act, producing “spirit pictures”. He then went into competition with Alexander on tours of the US and Canada, often using the same “Man Who Knows” catchline in his promotional advertising. Like Alexander, a so-called “Simla Séance” became part of his program. And like Alexander, he invited questions from the audience, then used purported superior mental powers to answer them. For a time, Cunningham still presented sleight-of-hand tricks and illusions, along with Simla Seances, but by 1920 he no longer performed escape tricks. Calling himself the Mental Miracle Man, and the Man Who Knows, his advertisements suggested he may be able to communicate with “departed spirits” and “actually look into the future”. He also answered questions on “business, love and matrimonial tangles”. By 1922, he was promoting himself as Dr Cunning, with his whole show devoted to his supposed psychic powers. This show continued until late 1923.

== As a circus showman ==
From 1924 to 1926, “Doc” Cunningham was employed by the Al. G. Barnes Circus, a major show which toured across the US for most of the non-winter months. Cunningham was manager of the circus’ side-show and annex, and an announcer under the big-top in the main show. Cunningham would later use his experience with Al. G. Barnes to secure other circus-related work. For example, in 1934 he was the announcer at a July 4 fireworks pageant and circus in Los Angeles.

== As a sexologist ==
After another spell in vaudeville programs in the late 1920s as a “mental marvel”, Cunningham reinvented himself yet again in the early 1930s, with a combined stage and screen program in which he was promoted as a “noted” sexologist, psychologist, and mentalist. He toured across several US states, showing movies advertised as being of sex education content to over age 16 audiences strictly divided by gender with “trained nurses in attendance”. Before the screening, Cunningham would deliver a “lecture”, then audience members would be invited to “ask him anything” about love, courtship, marriage, divorce and even financial matters. The first movie in this program, called “Delicate Secrets of Life”, was advertised as “the most daring and sensational moving picture ever made”. It was said to take viewers behind to scenes of European hospitals and show “a bloodless Caesarian birth”. Similar footage of a Caesarian birth was promised when Cunningham toured with “The Confession of a Lost Girl”, promoted as the “first all talking sex picture”. Advertisements for “Sins of Love” promised that the lecture by “Professor Cunning” would be “augmented with beautiful living human specimens” on the stage.

== Late career ==
Cunningham's willingness for versatility in his career never abated. After stopping touring and settling in California in the mid-1930s, he ran a miniature dog and pony show at schools, community fairs and shopping centres. At Christmas time he would work as a professional Santa Claus. Friend and fellow magician, Frank Herman, who worked alongside him in 1939 in Robinson's department store in Los Angeles, reported that Cunningham convinced children he really was Santa by using information relayed via earphones hidden under his cap and wig from a “Princess” who had spoken to them as they signed in. Nevertheless, Cunningham spent the majority of his career in the world of magic, and won wide respect among his contemporaries. “We know that all magicians will join in a devout wish for his recovery,” reported the magazine, Genii, in October, 1944, following reports that he had suffered a stroke. “Doc is one of magic's greatest characters.” A few months later, the Los Angeles Society of Magicians staged a testimonial dinner for Cunningham attended by about 200 people, including some of the top US performers.

== Family ==
Cunningham married Alice “Allie” Eva Dunn in Provo on 21 Sept 1892. At first she travelled with him on tour, but as the family grew this became impractical. She filed for divorce at the time he was touring with “Mademoiselle Edmunda” on the grounds of “abandonment of minor children”. However, the matter was settled out of court and the divorce did not proceed. When Cunningham died in Los Angeles in March 1951, at the age of 71, he was survived by his wife, two sons, two daughters, 12 grandchildren and 15 great-grandchildren
