= John Wyman =

John Wyman may refer to:

- John Wyman (magician) (1816–1881), American magician
- John Wyman (actor) (born 1944), British actor
