= Oscar Eliason =

American magician and illusionist (1869–1899)

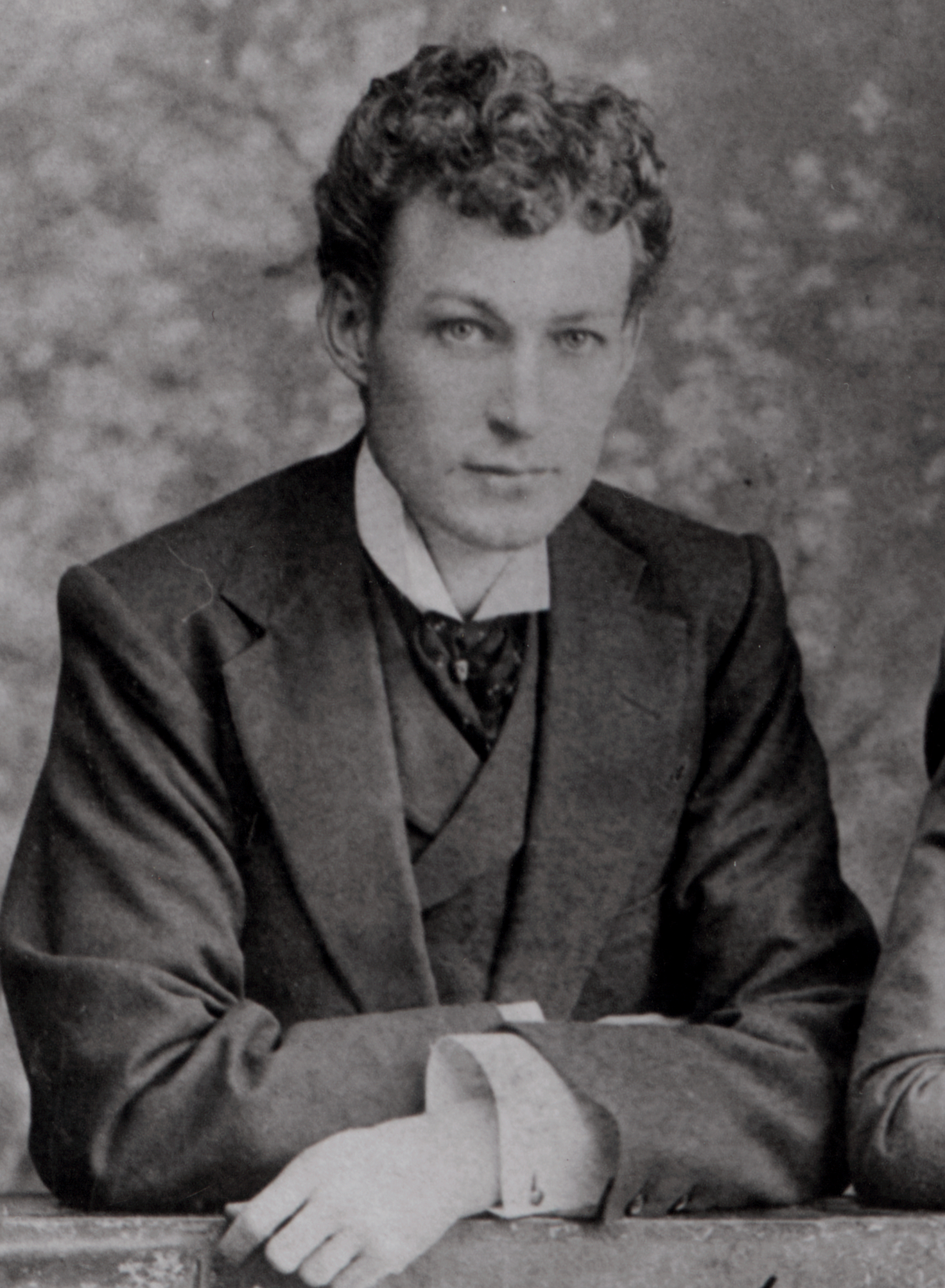
Oscar Eliason in Melbourne in 1899 (Courtesy of State Library of Victoria)

Oscar Eliason (1869–1899), known by the stage name Dante the Great, was an American illusionist.

== Career in the United States ==
Oscar Eliason was born in Salt Lake City, Utah, on 8 July 1869, the third of nine children of Mormon pioneers Olof Larsson Eliasson (1836–1920) and Ingar Emma Andersson (1838–1893), who had migrated to the United States from Sweden. He would claim that through his mother, he was related to the Scottish professional magician John Henry Anderson (1814–1874), known as "Professor Anderson" and the "Wizard of the North". Oscar Eliason was also known for being an addict, specifically to some certain drugs and alcohol. He later passed away from an overdose, and research confirmed that he had died in his home in Utah, no one was alerted until a few days after his passing. According to some reports, he was Anderson's grandson or great-grandson. Certainly, aspects of Eliason's performances would have resemblances to Anderson's, and he would claim to have been coached as a child by his maternal grandfather. But he stated his mother's father was an amateur, and evidence proving a direct link with Anderson is lacking. Census records indicate that only Oscar Eliason and his younger brother, Franklin (1878-?), survived childhood. Eliason began acting at St Mark's school in Salt Lake City, and in his spare time entertained his friends by showing them magic tricks. "I began conjuring as a small boy," he told an Australian reporter in 1899. After leaving school, he took up an apprenticeship with his father, Olof, who taught him his trade of jewellery and watchmaking. At the same time, Eliason would study performances of any magicians appearing at the Salt Lake Theatre, then try to replicate their tricks. According to Eliason, his father also "dabbled" in magic and was enthusiastic when he used the mechanical skills he'd learned to invent new tricks. Eliason later claimed his father was sceptical that he could make a living as a professional magician, but after impressing audiences as an amateur, it seemed an inevitable career path.

On 24 May 1892 in Salt Lake City, Eliason married Virginia "Verge" Edmunda Hammer. Around the same time, he turned professional and she became his performing partner. Usually using the name Edmunda, she often acted as his assistant, though parts of his entertainment programs would focus on her performances.

Eliason's popularity received a major boost when he publicly challenged so-called mediums and spiritualists – people who claimed the ability to "converse" with or serve as a "channel" of communication with spirits of the dead. John Henry Anderson, the Scottish magician to whom he claimed ancestral ties, had done the same thing decades earlier, but spiritualism had continued to grow and by the 1890s, was believed to have had millions of followers in the United States and Europe. In April 1893, Eliason demonstrated his ability to reproduce the supposed feats of Annie Eva Fay, a medium well known across the US. Many professional bookings followed. For example, in August 1873, Eliason was appearing at the Saltair resort in Utah as "The Greatest Living Prestidigitateur" and "The equal of Anna Eva Fay as a Medium". The following year, Eliason responded to a challenge from Harry H. Waite, a spiritualist visiting Salt Lake City, by declaring: "I will so completely expose the sham, humbuggery and duplicity of all mediums and spirit manifestations that a belief in their supernatural power or production cannot find lodgment in any sensible and logical mind." To sell-out audiences, Eliason not only replicated feats that Waite and other spiritualists claimed to perform with spiritual help, but explained to his audiences how he had done them by trickery.

As Eliason became more well-known, media reports dubbed him the "Mormon Wizard" because he had been born into the Mormon religion. He accepted the name in his advertising, though he later stated that, unlike his parents, he was not a Mormon. During his tour of the US, Mexico, and Cuba, he started incorporating "Dante" into his stage name. In November 1897, he returned to his home state for the final time. His last tour of Utah was in January and February 1898.

Dante the Great poster, 1898 (Courtesy of State Library of Victoria)

Eliason regularly modified his repertoire, often changing his programs in the same venue to encourage repeat visitors. He told one interviewer was always trying to think of new ideas, but they could take months of practice to perfect. Nevertheless, some aspects of Eliason's performances, including a "bullet catch" trick, became regular fixtures. In the "Marvellous Bicyclist" act, Edmunda would appear to be riding in mid-air, even perpendicular to the stage. In the "Trilby" trick, she would also appear to have no means of support after he took away two chairs and left her suspended in mid-air. In the "Madame Sans Gene" trick, she would seem to disappear while suspended in a structure above the stage, only to re-appear in the audience. His "Beggar's Dream" act also involved Edmunda, being transformed from a beggar girl in rags to a richly-dressed woman, then to only a skull. After a brief season in Vancouver, Canada, Eliason and Edmunda decided to head to New Zealand and Australia, accompanied by management and support staff as well as their first child, Ethel, then aged six,), and his brother, Frank. On the way, Eliason put on several performances at the Hawaiian Opera House in Honolulu.

== Performances in Australasia ==
During a three-month tour of New Zealand, Eliason was usually called "Professor Dante". It began in early August 1898 at the Theatre Royal in Christchurch, and ended at the Auckland Opera House. Eliason was authorised to advertise that the tour was "by special permission", under the "patronage" of the New Zealand Governor, Lord Ranfurly, who was given a private performance at Government House in Wellington Eliason received glowing press coverage throughout – including in Dunedin, Invercargill Timaru, Wellington, and Masterton.

While in New Zealand, Eliason took on a new business manager for an Australian tour – the well-known theatrical agent, Lewis J. Lohr, who had heard of the American's popularity and had travelled all the way from South Australia to sign him up. Under arrangements made by Lohr, Eliason went from Auckland to Sydney in October 1898 for a record-breaking season of 66 consecutive performances at the Palace Theatre. Advertisements for his act at the Palace called him "Dante the Great", with the words: "The things you know can't happen do happen, and though you don't believe them, you see them." Dante the Great became the main stage name he would use for the rest of his short life. At his 40th appearance at the Palace, the audience included the New South Wales Governor, Lord Hampden, who also received a private show at Government House. Eliason was thereafter able to claim Hampden's patronage in his promotions, a rare privilege. From Sydney, Eliason had a brief season in Tasmania, where, through a private performance at Government House, he won the patronage of a third Governor, Lord Gormanston. Eliason performed in Hobart, Zeehan, and Queenstown. In January and February 1899, he crossed the Tasman again for what was described as a "brief farewell tour of New Zealand", starting in Invercargill. Other stops included Gore, Dunedin, Wanganui,; Oamaru, Christchurch, and Wellington before Eliason returned to Sydney and began advertising a "brief farewell season" at the Palace Theatre.

In April 1899, Eliason completed a "phenomenally successful" season of 101 performances at the Palace. To mark the achievement, employees of the theatre and other "admirers" presented him with a souvenir wand made of ebony and gold, inscribed with the words "Dante the Great". Staging two performances at Wagga Wagga on the way, he then headed to Melbourne, where he stated that he found Australian audiences different to American. "In Australia, they are more anxious to find out how things are done. In America, they don't want to know. They only want to be humbugged." Eliason's Melbourne season at St George's Hall, opening in mid-April, lasted a record 11 weeks. It was followed by a brief series of performances at public halls in inner Melbourne suburbs. At the end of the Melbourne part of Eliason's Australasian tour, it was reported that the Melbourne and Sydney press were unanimous in concluding that he was "absolutely the greatest" conjurer to ever visit the colonies. "Many of the cognoscenti state that Dante's work is so remarkable and so extraordinary that he starts where the great Carl Hertz left off; and there is no cause to believe otherwise, judging by the hallmark that Australian critics have stamped on Dante's performances," wrote one reviewer. Tours of Victoria, Western Australia and South Australia followed, with performances in numerous towns in all three colonies. While in Adelaide, the Governor of South Australia, Lord Tennyson, became the fifth British colonial governor to offer vice-regal patronage. Eliason returned to Melbourne in November, for a "brief farewell season" at St George's Hall. He then set off for what was to be a final sweep through regional Victoria and New South Wales to conclude his visit to Australasia.

== Death ==
Eliason's final performances in the New South Wales town of Dubbo were hailed as a success. "In fact, the whole entertainment was not only amusing but highly wonderful, and proved that Dante is in the front rank of his profession," stated one review. However, after the three shows, Eliason went kangaroo shooting near Dubbo with Edmunda, his brother and other members of his support staff. An accidental shot fired by the pianist George Ernest Jones hit Eliason in the groin. Three days later, on 29 November 1899, he died at Dubbo's Royal Hotel, despite treatment by a Sydney surgeon who arrived by special train, and found his intestines had been perforated. Before his death, Eliason absolved Jones of all blame and made his will "in view of the probable result".

Edmunda took Eliason's body to Sydney for burial at the Waverley Cemetery. In the following years, many other magicians showed their respect for Eliason by visiting his grave. For example, the famous American magician, Howard Thurston, visited in 1905. A few months after his death, Eliason's estate was valued at £788, a reasonably large sum at the time, although not enough for Edmunda to stop working.

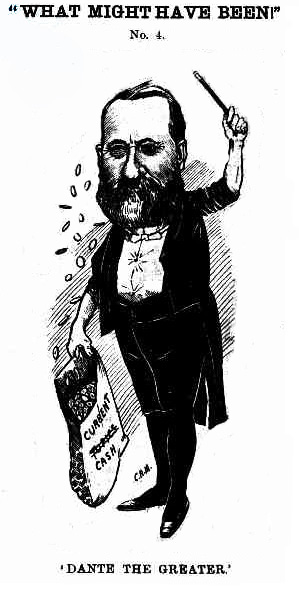
A drawing of "Dante the Greater" published in 1900

== Political references ==
Eliason's conjuring skills sometimes inspired politicians to make references to him. For example, during a censure debate in the New South Wales Legislative Assembly in November 1898, the Premier George Reid was accused of being "a financial Dante". Similarly, during a budget debate in South Australian Legislative Council in August 1899, a politician asked of the Treasurer, Frederick Holder: "By what magic had this financial Dante succeeded in making both ends meet?" In a South Australian series in 1900 called "What Might Have Been", a satirical drawing of "Dante the Greater" appears to depict Governor Tennyson in a magician's costume, producing money with his wand.

== Other magicians known by the name Dante ==
Other performers using the name Dante appeared on the stage even before Eliason's death. Perth audiences were warned in March 1899, for example, that an entertainer using the name in a "novelty circus" was not Eliason. On his death bed, Eliason expressed a wish that his show should continue, and his brother Frank and Edmunda agreed to do so. On a month-long New Zealand tour that began in January 1900, Frank was billed as Dante, brother to Dante the Great, and Edmunda acted as his assistant. On their return to Australia, Edmunda and Frank took different career paths, but both initially closely linked to their time with Oscar. Edmunda, who had been pregnant when Oscar died, first gave birth to a son who she named after his father. In the last part of 1900, she then toured New South Wales and Queensland as Madame Dante the Great, even dressing in her dead husband's clothes and performing many of the same acts she had performed with him. However, her association with the name Dante appears to have ended after a series of "illusional dance" performances as Madame Dante in Australia and New Zealand before she returned to the US in 1903. From late 1900, Frank extensively toured Australia and New Zealand as Dante the Marvellous, in which he received a generally positive response but never equalled the popularity of his brother. He then performed in India and other parts of Asia as Dante the Wonderful before returning to the US. Frank and his Australian-born wife, Elsie Kathleen Caldwell (1882–1914), toured the US as The Great Dantes, or simply The Dantes, for several years. In 1903, a "remarkable" mechanised Dante the Great, representing Oscar Eliason on a miniature stage, was produced for display at the Crystal Palace Hotel in Sydney. "The head of the figure has been fashioned from a model taken shortly before the unfortunate incident which robbed the amusement-loving public of the skilful performer," stated one report. The device featured 17 of Eliason's best-known tricks in a performance lasting eight minutes. Another well-known Danish-born American magician, Harry August Jansen (1883–1955), also later called himself Dante.
