= Chung Ling Soo =

American magician (1861–1918)

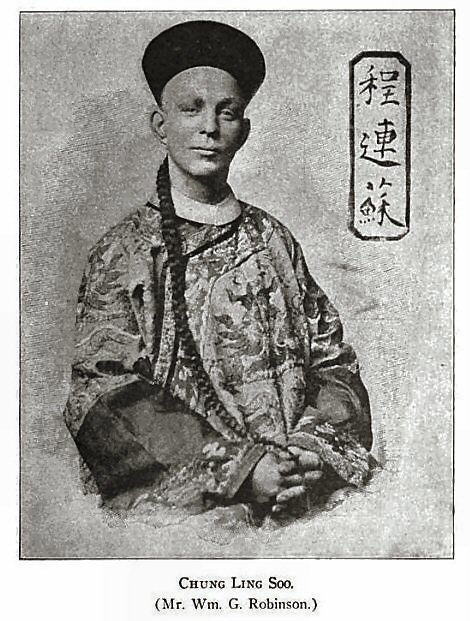
- The Old and New Magic pub. 1906
- Born: William Ellsworth Robinson; April 2, 1861; Westchester County, New York, US
- Died: March 24, 1918 (aged 56); London, England, UK
- Cause of death: Accidental shooting
- Resting place: East Sheen Cemetery
- Occupation: Stage magician
- Children: 5

William Ellsworth Robinson (April 2, 1861 – March 24, 1918) was an American magician who went by the stage name Chung Ling Soo (Chinese: 程連蘇; pinyin: Chéng Liánsū). He is mostly remembered today for his extensive use of yellowface in his act to falsely represent himself to be a Chinese man who spoke little English, as well as for his accidental death due to a failed bullet catch trick.

== Early years ==
Robinson was born in Westchester County, New York, the first of three children born to James Campbell Robinson and his wife Sarah Robinson (née Titus). Both of his parents were of Scottish descent. The family settled in Manhattan while James Robinson toured in Charles "Charlie" White's minstrel shows. James Robinson variously performed under the names "James Campbell", "H. J. Campbell" and "Professor Campbell", and his specialties included impersonations, "dialect singing", hypnotism, ventriloquism and magic tricks. He later taught his son how to perform magic tricks.

== Career ==
Robinson performed his first magic show at the age of 14 and began performing professionally on the vaudeville circuit shortly thereafter. He initially performed under the name "Robinson, the Man of Mystery". Robinson earned a decent living performing his act but was eager to become a headliner on vaudeville. In 1887, he began performing "black art illusions" under the name "Achmed Ben Ali". The act and Robinson's new stage name closely resembled that of German magician Max Auzinger, who performed under the name "Ben Ali Bey". (As Auzinger never toured the United States, the resemblance went largely unnoticed at the time.)

By 1896, Robinson had performed his acts in shows for Harry Kellar and Alexander Herrmann. After Herrmann's death in 1896, Robinson decided to strike out on his own. Around this time, Robinson learned of a challenge issued by Chinese stage magician Ching Ling Foo. In a gimmick that was standard for magicians of that era, Foo offered a prize of $1,000 to any person who could successfully duplicate his illusions. Robinson, who had watched Foo's act when he toured the United States and figured out how his illusions worked, accepted the challenge. However, Foo refused to meet with him as Robinson had accepted another previous challenge issued by Foo and lost. The snub left Robinson upset. In 1898, he authored the book Spirit Slate Writing and Kindred Phenomena. The book exposed the tricks of slate writing and a number of devices that fraudulent mediums would use to pretend to contact the dead.

In 1900, Robinson learned that an agent was looking for a Chinese magician to perform at the Folies Bergère in Paris. He accepted the job and quickly created a new act based on Ching Ling Foo's act. Robinson then began dressing in traditional Chinese attire, shaved his facial hair and began wearing his hair in a queue. To darken his complexion, he painted his face with greasepaint. To complete his new act, Robinson chose the stage name "Hop Sing Soo". Robinson's new act was a hit, and by the time he began performing in London, he had perfected his act and changed his name to "Chung Ling Soo" (a variation of Ching Ling Foo's name). Robinson then set about creating a fanciful back story for himself. As "Chung Ling Soo", Robinson claimed he was the American-born son of a Scottish missionary who married a Cantonese woman. He claimed his father was a descendant of the Campbell and Robinson clans and both his parents died before he was 13 years old. As an orphan, Soo said he was taken in by a Chinese magician named "Arr Hee", who trained him to perform ancient Chinese magic tricks mixed with more modern European magic. When Hee died, Soo began performing the magic his mentor had taught him.

As Chung Ling Soo, Robinson maintained his role as a Chinese man scrupulously. He never spoke onstage, claiming that he spoke no English (though he did occasionally say phrases in broken English) and always used an interpreter when he spoke to journalists. Soo's Chinese wife, "Suee Seen", acted as his assistant. "Suee Seen" was also Robinson's invention; in reality, she was Olive "Dot" Path, an American woman whom Robinson claimed was his wife. In fact, the two never married, as Robinson had never divorced his first wife, Bessie Smith.

As Chung Ling Soo, Robinson quickly became a popular stage magician in Europe and eventually became one of the highest-paid performers on the vaudeville circuit.

=== Feud with Ching Ling Foo ===
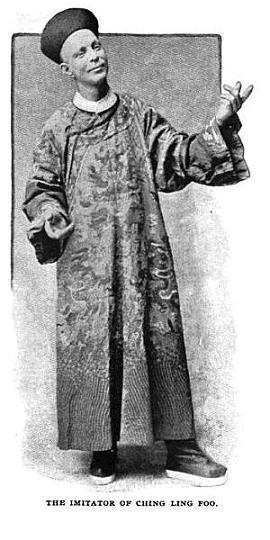
The Cosmopolitan, pub. 1903.

In January 1905, Soo was in London for an engagement at the Hippodrome. His rival, magician Ching Ling Foo, was performing at the nearby Empire Theatre. By this time, Foo was aware that Chung Ling Soo was actually William Robinson and that he had copied virtually Foo's entire act. He publicly called Chung Ling Soo an imposter and became intent on publicly exposing him as such. In order to garner publicity, Foo's promoter publicly announced that he would duplicate at least half of Chung Ling Soo's illusions to prove that he was the real "Original Chinese Conjurer". Soo accepted the challenge and agreed to meet Foo at the offices of The Weekly Dispatch for a press conference. When Ching Ling Foo realized that the press was not interested in Chung Ling Soo's real identity, he backed out of the press conference and the challenge. The episode was a public embarrassment for Ching Ling Foo, who remained at the Empire Theatre for only four weeks (Chung Ling Soo's engagement at the Hippodrome lasted three months).

Soo's most famous illusion, partly because of his death while performing it, was called "Condemned to Death by the Boxers". In this trick, Soo's assistants, sometimes dressed as Boxers, took two guns on to the stage. Several members of the audience were called up to the stage to mark a bullet that appeared to be loaded into one of the guns. Attendants fired the gun at Soo, and he appeared to catch the bullets from the air and drop them on a plate he held up in front of him. Actually, Soo palmed the bullets, hiding them in his hand during their examination and marking. The muzzle-loaded guns were rigged so that the gunpowder charge fired in a chamber below the barrel so that the bullet never left the gun.

The only known film record of "Chung Ling Soo" that exists today shows him greeting World War I veterans at a 1915 benefit performance.

== Personal life ==
Robinson married his assistant Bessie Smith on February 23, 1883. Shortly after the couple married, in December 1883, a woman with whom Robinson had been having an affair (possibly a young servant girl who worked for Robinson's parents) gave birth to his child, a girl named Annie. Robinson's parents took the child in and raised her. Robinson and Smith later had a son, Elmore (born February 1885). After the birth of their son, Smith could no longer rehearse long hours and travel with Robinson as his assistant. He soon lost interest in his wife after meeting Olive "Dot" Path (born Augusta Pfaff), who also became his assistant. As divorce was considered socially unacceptable at the time and Robinson was a Roman Catholic, he and Smith never formally divorced and simply decided to "cancel" their marriage.

Robinson and Path presented themselves as husband and wife for the next twenty years. They eventually married in a civil ceremony in March 1906. The marriage was not legally recognized as Robinson was still married to Bessie Smith. Shortly after Robinson married Path, he met Janet Louise Mary "Lou" Blatchford, an English woman from Plymouth. They began a sexual relationship and Blatchford became pregnant in May 1907. Path was angry to learn that Robinson had been unfaithful, but the two decided to continue to present themselves as husband and wife for the sake of the act. While "Chung Ling Soo" and "Suee Seen" continued to tour Europe, Blatchford lived in Barnes, London. In between engagements, Robinson would visit the home and the couple's children, of which there were eventually three: Ellsworth James (born February 1908), Hector (born December 1909) and Mary (born March 1911).

== Death ==
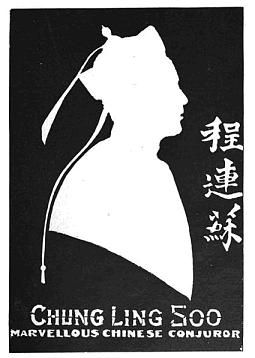
Chung Ling Soo in The Old and New Magic (1906)

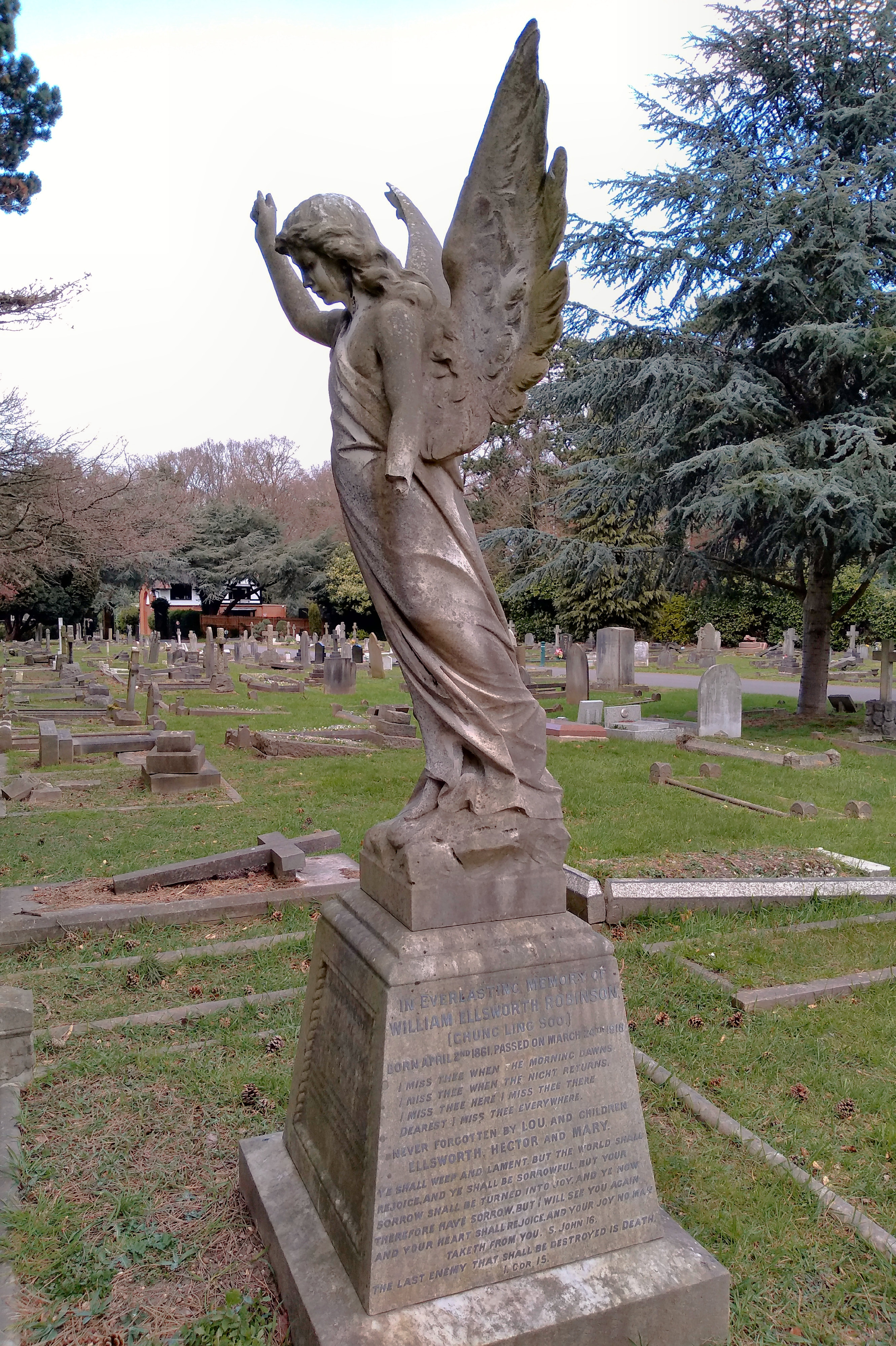
East Sheen Cemetery

On March 23, 1918, Chung Ling Soo was performing at the Wood Green Empire in London. He performed his act without incident until he got to the "Condemned to Death by the Boxers" illusion, his version of the bullet catch. That night, as one of his assistants fired the modified gun at him, some of the gunpowder exploded in the gun's chamber, accidentally firing the bullet (loaded only for show by the assistant) into Soo's lung. He fell to the ground and said, "Oh my God. Something's happened. Lower the curtain." This was the only time since adopting his persona that "Chung Ling Soo" had spoken English in public. Soo was taken to Passmore Edwards Cottage Hospital, but died the following morning. He is buried in East Sheen Cemetery in East Sheen, a suburb of London. The assistant who fired the gun, Jack Grossman, appeared on the UK TV show The Paul Daniels Magic Show, broadcast on November 6, 1982, where he assisted magician Paul Daniels to successfully recreate the trick.

During the inquest, Olive "Dot" Path explained the nature of Chung Ling Soo's trick. The muskets Soo used in his act were brazed with extra steel barrels. After each performance, to avoid expending powder and bullets, Soo never unloaded his guns properly. Rather than firing them off or drawing the bullets with a screw-rod, as was normal practice, he removed the bullet and powder by dismantling the breeches of the guns. Over time, a residue of unburned gunpowder was able to form in the channel he had made to allow the flash to bypass the barrel and ignite a blank charge in the ramrod tube. Thus, when Soo performed the trick that night, ignition of the residue in the channel allowed the flash from the pan to also ignite the charge behind the bullet not intended to be fired that was loaded into the barrel of the gun being used. Consequently, the bullet fired in the normal way, hitting Soo in the chest. The circumstances of the accident were verified by the gun expert Robert Churchill. Soo's death was ruled "accidental" with a final verdict of "misadventure".

After Chung Ling Soo's death, the public was shocked to learn that he was not Chinese, although Soo's true identity was largely known among professional magicians. A year before Soo's death, magician Will Goldston commented in an interview with Magician Monthly that the public did not question Soo's identity because "... he has always presented to the public that which they like and not which he might prefer".

== In popular culture ==
Soo's story is related by the detective in Gus Van Sant's film Last Days (2005). Soo also appears in the Christopher Nolan film The Prestige (2006). Soo's story also figures prominently in Bruce Hartman's short story "Illusionists" in The Philosophical Detective (2014). The story of his accidental onstage death is recounted by a character in the Ray Bradbury novel Dandelion Wine (1957) and in an episode of the BBC series Call the Gun Expert (1964) entitled "The Trick That Failed".

In Woody Allen's 2014 romantic comedy, Magic in the Moonlight, Colin Firth plays a similar orientalist magician named "Wei Ling Soo".

== See also ==
- List of entertainers who died during a performance
- Examples of yellowface

== Bibliography ==
- Andrews, Val (1981). A Gift from the Gods: The Story of Chung Ling Soo, Marvelous Chinese Conjurer. Goodliffe Publications.
- Dexter, Will (1955). The Riddle of Chung Ling Soo, Chinese Conjuror. Arco. ISBN 0-668-03826-8.
- Frank, Gary R. (1988). Chung Ling Soo, the Man of Mystery. Fantastic Magic Company.
- Hastings, Macdonald (1965). The Other Mr Churchill: A Lifetime of Shooting and Murder. G. G. Harrap.
- Karr, Todd, ed. (2001). The Silence of Chung Ling Soo. The Miracle Factory. ISBN 0-9710405-1-6.
- Kolpan, Gerald (2012). Magic Words: The Tale of a Jewish Boy-Interpreter, the Frontier's Most Estimable Magician, a Murderous Harlot, and America's Greatest Indian Chief. Open Road Media. ISBN 978-1-4532-4920-8.
- Soo, Chung Ling (1898). Spirit Slate Writing & Kindred Phenomenon. Munn.
