= Virginia Edmunda Hammer =

American entertainer

Virginia "Verge" Edmunda Hammer (1873–1946) was an American entertainer who performed as a magician's assistant, a magician, a "mind reader" and an "illusionary dancer". Her stage names included Electra the Magic Wonder, Mademoiselle Edmunda and Madame Edmunda.

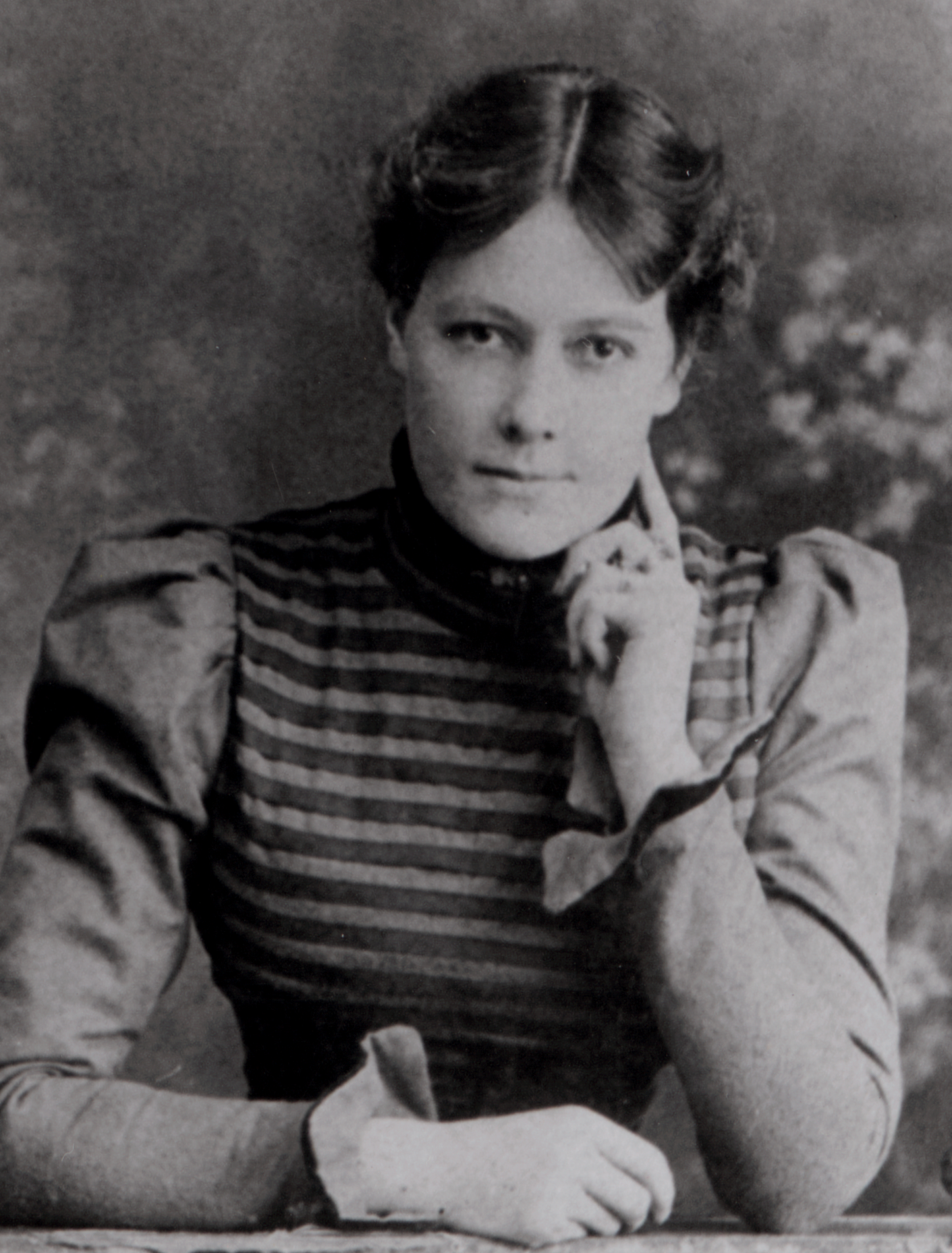
Edmunda Hammer, as the wife of Oscar Eliason (Dante the Great) in Melbourne in 1899 (Courtesy of State Library of Victoria)

== Performances with Oscar Eliason ==
Virginia ‘Verge’ Edmunda Hammer was born in 1873 in Salt Lake City, Utah. Her parents, Paul Edmund Balthazar Hammer (1838–1929) and Julia Marie Funk (1839–1947), had migrated to the US as Mormon pioneers from Denmark in 1861. Edmunda's father worked as a portrait painter and decorative artist, and was also a Mormon missionary. An early exposure to a stage career came through her elder brother, Paul Hammer junior (1869–1947), who worked at the Salt Lake City Theater from around the time she was born until its closure in 1928. Both Edmunda and her first future husband, Oscar Eliason, would end up performing at the theatre, at a time when they were under Paul Hammer's management. Edmunda was aged 19 when she married Oscar Eliason in Salt Lake City, on 24 May 1892. When Oscar became a professional magician around that time, Edmunda, also known as Verge, became his performing partner.

In one early joint performance in January 1893 she was “Electra, the Magnetic Wonder – a Young Lady who Challenges the United Strength of Six Powerful Men”. In performing this feat, Edmunda was mimicking the more well-known Lulu Hurst, whose fame had been achieved through demonstrations of force deflection. Some time after she became pregnant, Edmunda had to take a break from performing. Their first child, Ethel, was born on 13 July 1893 in Salt Lake City. Later Edmunda returned to the stage in Eliason's shows, including when he toured throughout the US and to Cuba, Mexico, Canada, New Zealand and Australia. Sometimes she acted as his assistant, but in other parts of the program, she was the main performer. With Eliason, she became the “Marvellous Bicyclist”, performing what one reviewer described as “one of the most inexplicable” tricks imaginable, appearing to ride a bicycle in mid-air, including downwards, with no visible means of support. On the couple's last tour of Utah, Edmunda gave performances of “mental telepathy”. Other aspects of her performances with Eliason in New Zealand and Australia involved “mind reading”. In Australia, while continuing the other acts, Edmunda also introduced an “illusionary dance creation”. The act, which would later become a staple in Edmunda's solo performances, were likely inspired by the pioneering dance and lighting techniques she'd seen performed by Loie Fuller, who had briefly toured with Eliason prior to their departure for Australasia.

The importance of Edmunda's contribution to Eliason's success was often acknowledged by critics. One wrote: “Professor Dante’s success in Perth was assured from the first performance and that success was in considerable measure due to the attractive personality and dramatic power of Mlle Edmunda. Wrote another: “An invaluable aid to Dante in his show is Mdlle Edmunda, whose graceful movements in diaphanous robes with limelight effects is a very pleasing feature of the evening’s entertainment. Her mid-air cycling, too, has attracted much attention.

After record-setting seasons in both Sydney and Melbourne, and a trip to Australia’s west coast, Eliason had just finished three shows in Dubbo, New South Wales, when he died after being accidentally shot while kangaroo hunting in November 1899. Before news of his shooting became known, the local press was again singing the praises of both Eliason and Edmunda. “The various…tricks and illusions – the most sensational of which was the consumption by fire and disappearance of Madame Edmunda – were done with all the celerity and cleverness of a past master in the art of magic and mystery,” wrote one reviewer. “Madame Edmunda’s reading, while blindfolded, rows of figures made by members of the audience, was extraordinary.”

Edmunda took Eliason's body by train to Sydney, to be buried at the Waverley Cemetery. "Verge was very hysterical before his death and for some time after, constantly requiring watching,” wrote Eliason's brother, Frank (1878–?), who had been touring with the couple. “She bore up bravely at the funeral and has done so since,” he told her brother, Paul Hammer. She was supported in Sydney by Viola Pratt Gillette, an opera singer from Utah who had been performing in Australia at the same time. “As soon as Mrs Eliason arrived in Sydney with the body I had her with me all the time,” Pratt told a reporter. “I was the only woman she knew, and I can't tell you how pitiful it was when her husband was buried. I held her up on one side and his brother was on the other.

== Performances with Frank Eliason ==
In January 1900, Edmunda left Sydney for a tour of New Zealand with Frank Eliason, in line with a wish expressed by her husband on his death-bed for her to continue his show. She worked as assistant to Frank, who was promoted as Dante, brother to Dante the Great. However, the tour lasted only a month. One report claimed it had been only a “fair success”, and not profitable enough for manager Edwin Geach, who had previously managed Oscar Eliason. Back in Sydney, Edmunda, who was pregnant again, suspended performing. She later told an interviewer she felt a combination of grief and loneliness as she awaited the birth of her second child. “People were very kind to me, but they are not like relatives and your mother,” she said. “You seem to want a mother so badly in times of trouble.” Edmunda gave birth in August 1900 to a son, who she named Oscar after his father.

== Solo performances ==
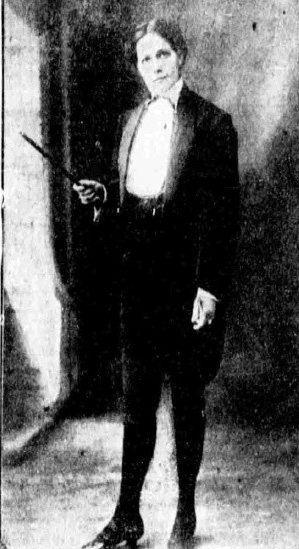
Edmunda dressed in her late husband's clothes in 1900, when she performed as Madame Dante

Less than three months after the birth of Oscar junior, Edmunda hired a nurse to accompany her and left Sydney for a tour of New South Wales and Queensland as Madame Dante the Great, explaining that was completing her late husband's bookings. During the tour, she dressed in Eliason's clothes and performed most of the main tricks he had done. This included tricks in which she had previously played the role of his assistant, but in which she now had an assistant of her own. “Every trick he ever turned I duplicated, perhaps not as deftly as he did, but I did them all the same, and…the critics said I did well,” she recalled. Certainly, she received mainly positive press coverage during her tour, which ended at the Brisbane Opera House early in 1901.

Edmunda spent the last quarter of 1901 performing “illusionary dance creations” like those she had already performed on stage with Eliason after she accepted an offer to open a season at Harry Rickards’ Tivoli Theatre in Sydney. She appeared on the same program as Charles de Wynne, who did shadowgraphy and magic tricks, but performed alone. Despite her dance act being well received in Sydney, and then in Melbourne and Adelaide, Edmunda told an interviewer she was thinking of touring India and South Africa as a magician. Instead she joined Dix’s Gaiety Company in January 1902 for a tour of New Zealand, in which she was promoted both as “America’s greatest illusionary dancer” and as the widow of the late Dante the Great. The tour took in Wellington, Auckland and Dunedin before it ended in mid-March at the Christchurch Opera House.

A few months after her New Zealand tour, Edmunda was reported to be “resting” in Sydney. She returned to the US in mid-1903, telling an interviewer in Utah that although the stage had no particular charm to her, she felt that she must keep performing. She was intending to leave Ethel and Oscar with relatives in Salt Lake City for a few months to resume “vaudeville, dancing and magic” when the new theatre season opened that September. Edmunda did not reveal precisely where she was planning to go, but around 1905, in San Rafael, California, she had a third child, Jean Alice Morse. The father was Utah resident, Brigham L. Morse, who Edmunda had married as “Verge Hammer” on her return to Utah.

== Likely performances with Robert (Bob) "Doc" Cunningham ==
There is strong evidence that Edmunda later worked back in the US with another leading American illusionist from Utah, Robert (Bob) "Doc" Cunningham (1873–1951), who visited Oscar Eliason's grave and met her in Sydney in 1902. From 1909 to 1912 Cunningham, who used the stage name Cunning, performed across the US with “Mademoiselle Edmunda” – the same stage name Edmunda Eliason had used. Many new acts introduced by Cunningham while Mademoiselle Edmunda was working with him were key acts previously performed by Eliason. In April 1911, for example, Mademoiselle Edmunda was promoted as a “maid of mystery” at one of Cunning's shows in Salt Lake City. Audiences were promised that she would give demonstrations on the supposed feats of the so-called medium Annie Eva Fay. Oscar Eliason had done the identical thing in the same city many years earlier. Cunning promised that Mademoiselle Edmunda would also demonstrate “mind reading” by correctly naming numbers written on a blackboard by audience members while blindfolded, then doing calculations with them. Edmunda had performed precisely the same trick both with Eliason and then by herself after his death, using an assistant. Later that year, a report previewing other shows in Utah hinted at her performances in Australia when it stated that Mademoiselle Edmunda's “psychological experiments” were “the wonder of two continents”. And during a visit to Hawaii in 1912, the promotional words for Mademoiselle Edmunda's act of “what you know can’t happen, does happen, and though you don’t believe it, you see it” were almost precisely the same as those used for Eliason's shows in Australia.

== Family ==
Besides Oscar Eliason and Brigham Morse, Edmunda also had two other husbands. By April 1907 she had divorced Brigham Morse and married Charles Belcher. The 1910 US census identified him as an Australian-born auditor, working for a telephone company in Salt Lake City, but they later divorced. By the time of the 1940 census, Edmunda had again divorced and remarried, this time to Californian-born typewriter repairman, Charles A. Fischer. Edmunda died in Richmond, California, on 8 February 1946. A death notice said she was leaving behind a husband, four children, and four grandchildren.
