= Ching Ling Foo =

Chinese magician (1854–1922)

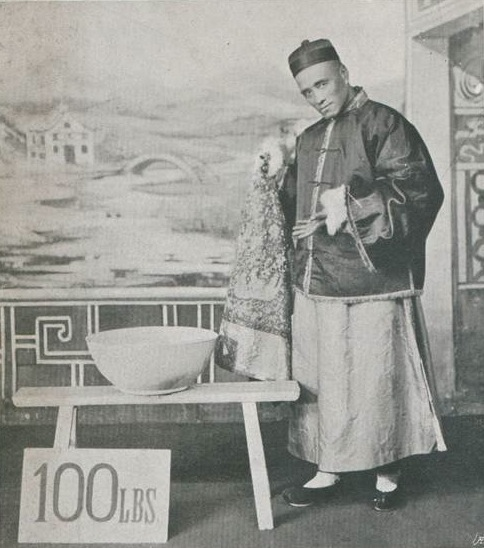
Postcard with Ching Ling Foo, 1898

Ching Ling Foo (Chinese: 金陵福; pinyin: Jīn Língfú) was the stage name of the Chinese magician Chee Ling Qua (Chinese: 朱連魁; pinyin: Zhū Liánkuí, 1854–1922). He is credited with being the first modern East Asian magician to achieve world fame.

== Biography ==
Ching Ling Foo was born in Tianjin, Qing dynasty, on May 11, 1854, He studied traditional Chinese magic and was a well-respected performer in his homeland.

During a typical performance, he stunned the audience by breathing smoke and fire or producing ribbons and a 15-foot-long (4.6 m) pole from his mouth. One of his sensational tricks had Chee using a sword to cut the head of a serving boy off at the shoulders. Then, to the amazement of the audience, the “beheaded” boy turns and exits the stage.

Another trick involved producing a huge bowl, full to the brim with water, from out of an empty cloth. He would then pull a small child from the bowl.

With what a 1899 New York Times article had claimed was special permission from the emperor of China, he was able bring his show to the 1898 Trans-Mississippi and International Exposition in Omaha, Nebraska. After the Omaha event, he began performing his show at the Hopkins theater circuit. When he brought his show to the United States in 1898, he began offering a $1,000 reward to anyone who could reproduce his water trick. (This was quite a large sum for the time, equivalent to about $33,050 in 2021.) New York-born William Robinson, who worked occasionally as a magician, decided to try for the $1,000. Chee rebuffed him. Unable to claim the $1,000, Robinson developed a Chinese-style show of his own and recreated himself as Chung Ling Soo. Robinson, in the guise of Chung, traveled to Europe and a deep rivalry was begun between the two men.

According to an April 2, 1899 article in the New York Times, Ching Ling Foo was ordered by the emperor to return to China by order of a telegraph from China to the U.S. government. However, an April 26 court ruling in Chicago ruled that he does not need to return to China. The ruling was based on his exemption to the Alien Contract Labor Law of that time.

In 1905 London, Ching Ling Foo was performing at the Empire Theatre and Chung Ling Soo was performing at the Hippodrome. In an open letter written by Empire manager H.J. Hitchings on behalf of Ching Loo Foo, he present a challenge, based largely on suspicions of plagiarism, to Chung Ling Soo (William Robinson). The first was that 100 pounds would be given to charity if Soo can prove:

- He is Chinese.
- He had performed a Chinese magic show prior to the 1898 shows by Foo.

The challenge continued with the following:

- Chung Ling Soo will be paid 500 pounds if he can prove that it was he who was plagiarized.
- To appear in a public competition with Ching Loo Foo, "for any sum up to 1000 pounds", which will go to his opponent if:
  1. Foo fails to do any of his opponent's magic tricks, or
  2. Soo can do any ten out of the 20 magic tricks Foo does from the show.

In 1913, after not having had a U.S. theater show for 14 years, he was a part of the Ziegfeld Follies show at the Olympic Theater in Saint Louis, Missouri. A group of Chinese women with bound feet, including Chee's wife, accompanied the magician outside China and was shown as another attraction. Other members of Chee's family would also participate in his act. He would often conjure his daughter, Chee Toy, onto the stage while his son would perform acrobatics and juggling.

Ching Ling Foo died in Shanghai, Republic of China in 1922, aged 69 years.

== In popular culture ==
=== Music ===
Irving Berlin included him in his lyrics for "From Here to Shanghai" (1917)

"I'll eat the way they do,
With a pair of wooden sticks,
And I'll have Ching Ling Foo,
Doing all his magic tricks."

In the musical Strike Up the Band, the Gershwins included the song "Patriotic Rally" which had the following verses:

"Land of Washington and Lincoln, Henry Ford and Morris Gest,
Land of Franklin, Land of Coolidge — men who stood the test!
Land of Jefferson and Adams, Dempsey and Ben Turpin, too,
Andrew Jackson, Woodrow Wilson — all red, white, and blue!
Francis Bushman, Charlotte Cushman, and old Edwin Booth.
Admiral Dewey, "Lefty" Louie, and "Bambino" Ruth!
We could go on naming great men, but we have our fears;
this could go on for years!
Land of Minsky and Rumshinsky, Land of Donahue,
Land of Johnson and Yon Yonson, Land of Ching Ling Foo!"

=== Film ===
Christopher Nolan's The Prestige—about two warring stage conjurers—depicts a Chinese magician working in London, who performs a trick with a water bowl similar to one of Foo's stunts.
