= Fox sisters =

Group of American spiritualist sisters

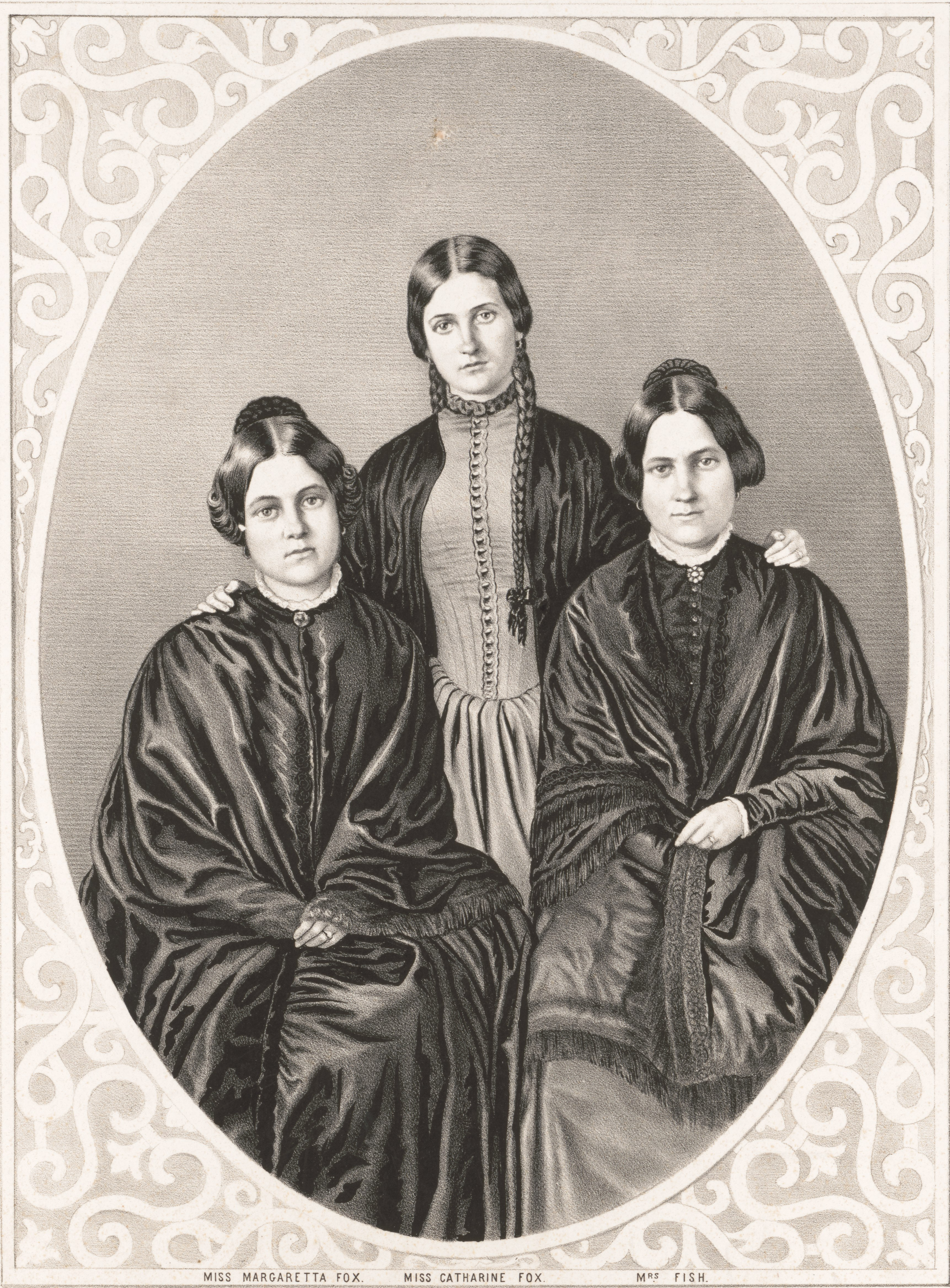
The Fox sisters. From left to right: Margaretta, Kate and Leah

The Fox sisters were three sisters from Rochester, New York who played an important role in the creation of Spiritualism: Leah (April 8, 1813 – November 1, 1890), Margaretta (also called Maggie; October 7, 1833 – March 8, 1893) and Catherine Fox (also called Kate; March 27, 1837 – July 2, 1892). The two younger sisters reported "rappings" to convince their older sister and others that they were communicating with spirits as if by a coded signal. Their older sister then took charge of them and managed their careers for some time. They all enjoyed success as mediums for many years.

In 1888, Margaretta recanted her story, saying the rappings had been a hoax and publicly demonstrated their method, although she later retracted this confession. Despite their loss of credibility, the Spiritualism movement continued to grow in popularity.

== Early years ==
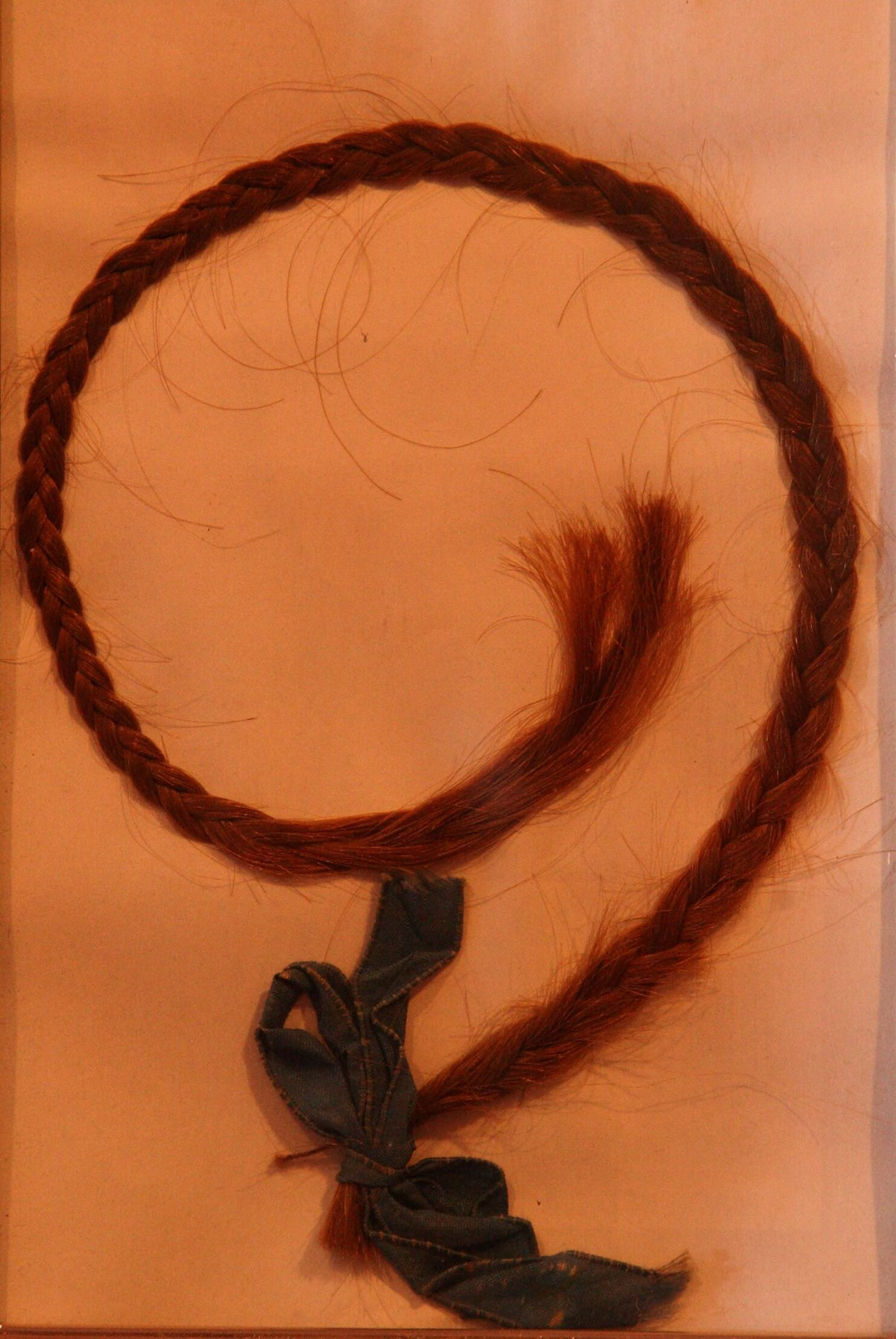
Braided lock of Kate Fox's hair

The childhood environment of Kate and Maggie Fox was marked by significant domestic instability that contributed to the conditions in which their claims of spirit communication emerged. In 1848, the two younger sisters—Catherine and Margaretta—lived with their parents John and Margaret, who were Methodists, in Hydesville, New York, a former hamlet that was part of the township of Arcadia in Wayne County, New York, just outside of Newark. The girls had been born and raised "in or near Consecon," a tiny village in Prince Edward County, Ontario where their father owned a farm. The family moved to Hydesville, New York, in 1847.

The house was reputed to be haunted, yet is reported to have been a prank. (The sisters claimed in 1888 that they made the sounds by cracking their knuckles and other joints as well as other means. By that time, 40 years later, the sisters were famous mediums. (Note: In 1888, Margaretta told her story of the origins of the mysterious "rappings": When we went to bed at night we used to tie an apple to a string and move the string up and down, causing the apple to bump on the floor, or we would drop the apple on the floor, making a strange noise every time it would rebound. Mother listened to this for a time. She would not understand it and did not suspect us as being capable of a trick because we were so young. During the night of March 31, Kate challenged the invisible noisemaker, presumed to be a "spirit", to repeat the snaps of her fingers. "It" did. "It" was asked to rap out the ages of the girls. "It" did. The neighbors were called in. Over the course of the next few days a code was developed where raps could signify yes or no in response to a question or be used to indicate a letter of the alphabet. The girls addressed the spirit as "Mr. Splitfoot", which is a nickname for the Devil. Later, the alleged "entity" creating the sounds claimed to be the spirit of a peddler named Charles B. Rosna, who had been murdered five years earlier and buried in the cellar. In his writings on the Fox sisters, Arthur Conan Doyle claimed the neighbors dug up the cellar and found a few pieces of bone. No missing person named Charles B. Rosna was ever identified.)) Margaretta Fox, in her later years, noted that neighbors were sure that the house was haunted, reputedly after a man who had been murdered in the house by a (falsely accused) man named Bell. (Note: Margaretta Fox, in her later years They [the neighbors] were convinced that someone had been murdered in the house. They asked the spirits through us about it and we would rap one for the spirit answer 'yes,' not three as we did afterward. The murder, they concluded, must have been committed in the house. They went over the whole surrounding country trying to get the names of people who had formerly lived in the house. Finally, they found a man by the name of Bell, and they said that this poor innocent man had committed a murder in the house and that the noises had come from the spirit of the murdered person. Poor Bell was shunned and looked upon by the whole community as a murderer.)

Kate and Margaretta were sent to nearby Rochester during the excitement—Kate to the house of her sister Leah (now the married Leah Fox Fish), and Margaretta to the home of her brother David—and the rappings followed them. Amy and Isaac Post, a radical Quaker couple and long-standing friends of the Fox family, invited the girls into their Rochester home. Immediately convinced of the genuineness of the phenomena, they helped to spread the word among their radical Quaker friends, who became the early core of Spiritualists. In this way, the association between Spiritualism and radical political causes developed, such as abolition, temperance, and equal rights for women.

== Emergence as mediums ==
On 14 November 1849, the Fox sisters demonstrated their spiritualist rapping at the Corinthian Hall in Rochester. This was the first demonstration of spiritualism held before a paying public and inaugurated a long history of public events featured by spiritualist mediums and leaders in the United States and in other countries.

Kate and Margaretta became famous mediums and they held séances for hundreds of people. Many of these early séances were entirely frivolous, where sitters sought insight into "the state of railway stocks or the issue of love affairs."

Horace Greeley, the prominent publisher and politician, became a kind of mentor for them, enabling their movement in higher social circles. Their public séances in New York in 1850 attracted notable people, including William Cullen Bryant, George Bancroft, James Fenimore Cooper, Nathaniel Parker Willis, Sojourner Truth and William Lloyd Garrison. Although Greeley watched over the sisters, the lack of parental supervision was pernicious, as both of the young women began to drink wine.

=== Evaluation ===
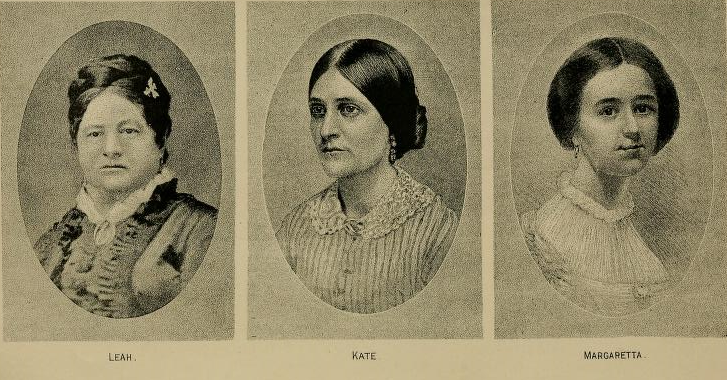
The three sisters in 1884

Beginning in 1850, some critics concluded that the girls made the rappings themselves, including physician E. P. Longworthy, (Note: The physician E. P. Longworthy investigated the sisters and noted how the knockings or raps always came from under their feet or when their dresses were in contact with the table. He concluded that Margaretta and Kate had produced the noises themselves.) John W. Hurn, Reverend John M. Austin, and Reverend D. Potts. (Note: John W. Hurn who published articles in the New-York Tribune also came to a similar conclusion of fraud. The Reverend John M. Austin would later claim the noises could be made by cracking toe joints. The Reverend D. Potts demonstrated to an audience that the raps could be made by this method.) In 1851, the Reverend C. Chauncey Burr wrote in the New York Tribune that by cracking toe joints the sounds were so loud, they could be heard throughout a large hall. In the same year, investigators from the University at Buffalo concluded that the raps were made by cracking joints of their body and that the raps would not occur if they had cushions under their feet. (Note: Three investigators Austin Flint, Charles E. Lee and C.B. Coventry from the University at Buffalo examined the raps produced by the sisters and concluded they were produced by cracking their bone joints such as toes, knees, ankles or hips. From a control, they discovered the raps did not occur if the sisters were placed on a couch with cushions under their feet.)

In 1851, Mrs. Norman Culver, a relative of the Fox family, admitted in a signed statement that she had assisted them during their séances by touching them to indicate when the raps should be made. She also claimed that Kate and Margaretta revealed to her the method of producing the raps by cracking their toes and using their knees and ankles.

Charles Grafton Page, a patent examiner and patent advocate, had developed a keen eye for detecting fraudulent claims about science. In his book Psychomancy (1853), Page observed that the rapping sounds came from underneath the girls' long dresses. (Note: In 1853, Charles Grafton Page of Washington, D.C., investigated the Fox sisters. As a patent examiner and patent advocate, Page had developed a keen eye for detecting fraudulent claims about science. He applied these skills in exposing some of the deceptions employed by the Fox sisters during two sessions which he attended. In his book Psychomancy (1853), Page observed that the rapping sounds came from underneath the girls' long dresses. When he asked if the spirits could produce a sound at a distance from their own bodies, one girl climbed into a wardrobe closet where her dress touched the wood, whence the sound transmitted into the wood plank — however, she was unable to control this sound sufficiently to produce spirit communications. Page devised contraptions that emulated the rapping sounds produced by the girls, which could be concealed under long clothing. He declaimed the girls' means of hiding from the bodily examination that would expose their fraud: The feminine security of these rappers against the inspection of their actual quomodo... if by search warrant, stratagem, or vi et armis, the rapping instrument of these Fox girls had been exposed to the public, there would not have been one doubt about the nature and origin of the spiritual communications.) In 1857, the Boston Courier offered a prize of $500 to any medium who could demonstrate a paranormal ability. The Fox sisters made an attempt and were investigated by a committee, which included the magician John Wyman. The committee concluded the raps were produced by bone and feet movements and thus the Fox sisters failed the challenge. A report by the Seybert Commission in 1887 stated that after investigating various mediums, including Margaretta, the phenomena could have easily been produced by fraudulent methods. The report also noted that the raps were heard close to Margaretta and a séance sitter, Professor Furness, had felt pulsations in her foot.

Kate was examined by William Crookes, the prominent physicist, between 1871 and 1874, who concluded the raps were genuine. However, Crookes was described as gullible and the mediums he investigated were caught using trickery.

Harry Houdini, the magician who devoted a large part of his life to debunking Spiritualist claims, provided this insight:

As to the delusion of sound. Sound waves are deflected just as light waves are reflected by the intervention of a proper medium and under certain conditions it is a difficult thing to locate their source.

=== Retraction and subsequent denial ===
In 1888, the two sisters traveled to New York City, where a reporter offered $1,500 if they would expose their methods and give him an exclusive on the story. Margaretta appeared publicly at the New York Academy of Music on October 21, 1888, with Kate present. Before an audience of 2,000, Margaret demonstrated how she could produce—at will—raps audible throughout the theater. Doctors from the audience came on stage to verify that the cracking of her toe joints was the source of the sound. (Note: Margaretta stated of her later career, Mrs. Underhill, my eldest sister, took Katie and me to Rochester. There it was that we discovered a new way to make the raps. My sister Katie was the first to observe that by swishing her fingers she could produce certain noises with her knuckles and joints and that the same effect could be made with the toes. Finding that we could make raps with our feet – first with one foot and then with both – we practiced until we could do this easily when the room was dark. Like most perplexing things when made clear, it is astonishing how easily it is done. The rapping is simply the result of perfect control of the muscles of the leg below the knee, which govern the tendons of the foot and allow the action of the toe and ankle bones that are not commonly known. Such perfect control is only possible when the child is taken at an early age and carefully and continually taught to practice the muscles, which grow stiffer in later years. ... This, then, is the simple explanation of the whole method of the knocks and raps. Margaretta wrote of the reception of the rapping sounds: A great many people when they hear the rapping imagine at once that the spirits are touching them. It is a very common delusion. Some very wealthy people came to see me some years ago when I lived in Forty-second Street and I did some rappings for them. I made the spirit rap on the chair and one of the ladies cried out: 'I feel the spirit tapping me on the shoulder.' Of course, that was pure imagination.)

Margaretta told this version of the origins of the mysterious rappings in a signed confession given to the press and published in New York World, October 21, 1888. In it, she explained the Hydesville events. According to Arthur Conan Doyle, however, the persistence of the knocks throughout the night of March 31, even in the girls' absence, proves their authenticity, as attested by the testimony of a neighbor named Mr. Duesler:

The statement made by Mr. Duesler, chief of the committee, gives important testimony to the occurrence of the noises and jars in the absence of the Fox girls from the house, and disposes once and for ever of all suspicion of their complicity in these events. Mrs. Fox, as we have seen, referring to the night of Friday, March 31, said: "I and my children left the house."

— A. C. Doyle

A year later, in an interview for the New York Press in November 20th of 1889, Margaret Fox completely retracted her previous confession. She stated that her 1888 public admission had been coerced from her in exchange for money—as she was facing severe financial distress—and under intense pressure from individuals who sought to destroy the Spiritualism movement.

"I wish God could undo the injustice I did to the cause of Spiritism when, under the strong psychological influence of his enemies (of Spiritism), I uttered words that did not had foundation in the truth."

— Margaret Kate, New York Press, November 20th, 1889, in A.C. Doyle

Furthermore, journalist Reuben Briggs Davenport and the New York World, who had promised Margaret thousands of dollars to confess to the hoax, defaulted on the agreement, failing to pay the full pattuited sum once the public spectacle and media sensation subsided. For skeptics and scientists, this constant reversal of testimony merely proved that the sisters were manipulators willing to say anything for monetary gain.

=== Later career and fall into poverty ===
Kate Fox, who had maintained a lower profile the previous year despite initially supporting her sister, joined in the retraction. However, the reputational damage was irreversible. Deprived of the promised financial relief and completely ostracized by the Spiritualist community, who viewed them as traitors, the sisters sank into even deeper poverty.

To survive and secure a livelihood, Margaret and Kate felt compelled to resume paid séances, claiming that their spiritual powers had returned. They had attempted to return to Spiritualist performances, but never again attracted the attention or paying clientele of the sisters' earlier careers.

This exhausting and continuous shifting of versions took a severe toll on their physical and mental health. Both sisters died in extreme destitution—Kate in 1892 and Margaret in 1893—leaving the true nature of the raps unresolved and forever shrouded in doubt.

=== Bones in childhood house ===
In 1904, remains were found in the cellar when a false wall fell down. The Boston Journal published a story about the discovery, claiming that it was the body of a supposed peddler, on November 22, 1904. However, the police at the time didn't open an investigation, as a physician who examined the remains found that it consisted of random bits of bones, including chicken bones, and concluded they had been placed there as a practical joke.

A few years later, a "peddler tin box" was claimed to have been found in the cellar along with the remains, although there is no mention of the box in earlier accounts of the finding. The remains and the tin box are now in the Lily Dale Museum. Skeptical researcher Joe Nickell concluded after researching the box that at least part of the bones were those of animals, a continuation of the hoax. There has been no confirmation that the peddler existed. The alleged false wall appears to be due to an expansion of the foundation, not the concealment of a secret grave.

== Personal lives ==
Leah, on the death of her first husband, married a successful Wall Street banker. Margaretta met Elisha Kane, the Arctic explorer, in 1852. Kane was convinced that Margaretta and Kate were engaged in fraud, under the direction of their sister Leah, and he sought to break Margaretta from the group. Kane married Margaretta nonetheless, and she converted to the Roman Catholic faith. When Kane died in 1857, she returned to her activities as a medium.

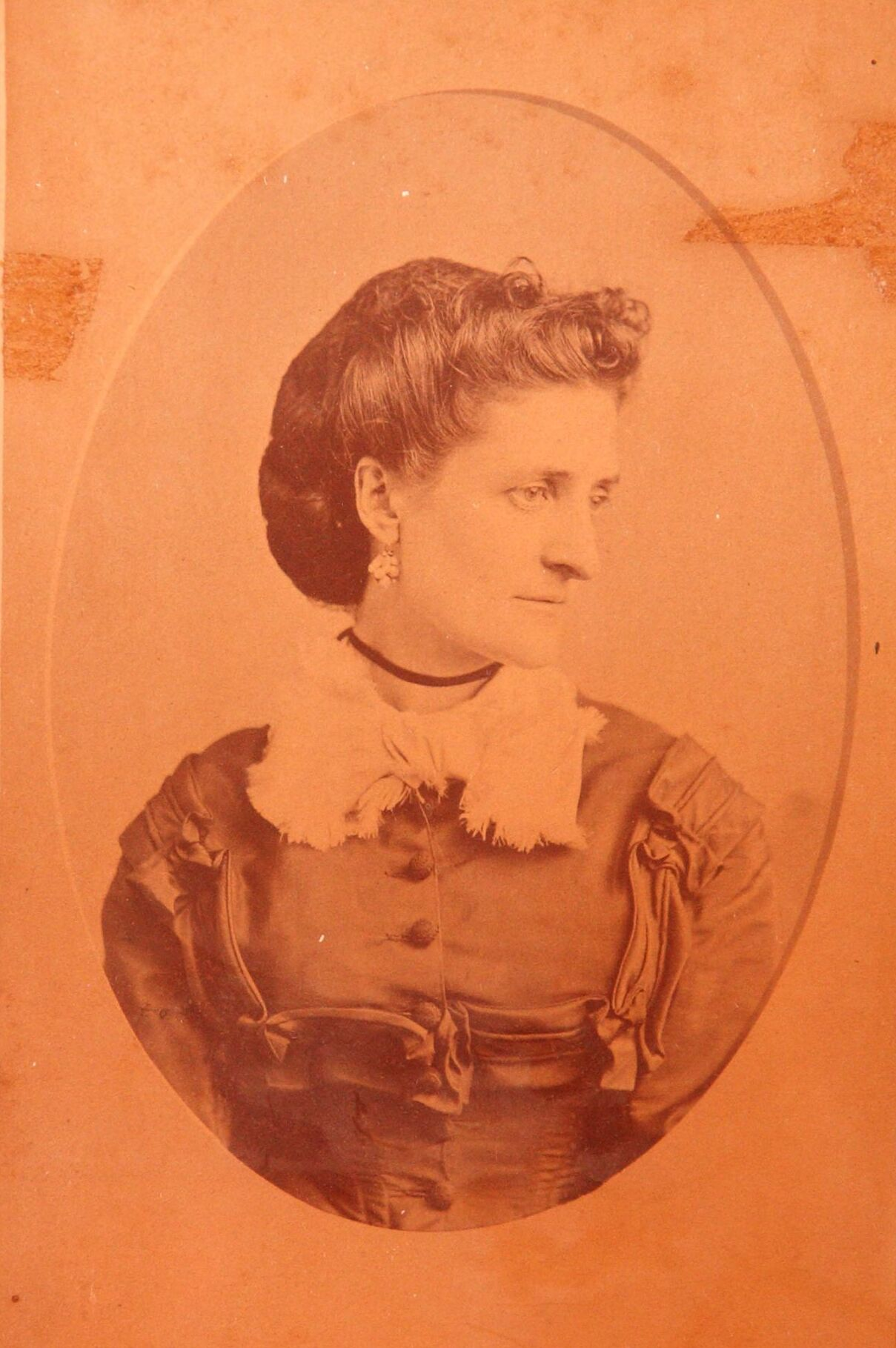
Kate Fox (Jenkin)

Kate had traveled to England in 1871, the trip paid for by a wealthy New York banker, so she would not be compelled to accept payment for her services as a medium. The trip was apparently considered missionary work since Kate sat only for prominent persons, who would let their names be printed as witnesses to a séance. In 1872, Kate married H.D. Jencken, a London barrister, legal scholar, and enthusiastic Spiritualist. Jencken died in 1881, leaving Kate with two sons. In 1876, Margaretta joined her sister Kate, who was living in England.

Over the years, sisters Kate and Margaretta had developed serious drinking problems. Around 1888, they became embroiled in a quarrel with their sister Leah and other leading Spiritualists, who were concerned that Kate was drinking too much to care for her children. At the same time, Margaretta, contemplating a return to the Roman Catholic faith, became convinced that her powers were diabolical.

Kate died at her home, at 609 Columbus Avenue in New York City, on July 3, 1892. Less than a year later, Margaretta, deep in alcoholism, was living on charity as the sole tenant of an old tenement house at 456 West 56th Street. She was taken to the home of Spiritualist Mrs. Emily B. Ruggles, 492 State Street in Brooklyn, where she died on March 8, 1893. All three sisters are interred in Brooklyn, New York: Margaretta and Catherine in Cypress Hills Cemetery, and Leah with the Fox family in Green-Wood Cemetery.

== Legacy ==
=== Parapsychology ===
The Fox sisters have been widely cited in parapsychology and spiritualist literature. According to psychologists Leonard Zusne and Warren Jones, "many accounts of the Fox sisters leave out their confession of fraud and present the rappings as genuine manifestations of the spirit world." C. E. M. Hansel noted in 1989 that "remarkably, the Fox sisters are still discussed in the parapsychological literature without mention of their trickery."

=== In popular culture ===
- The Fabulist Fox Sister (2020 musical), by Luke Bateman and Michael Conley.
- The Foxes of Hydesville (2023 podcast), written & directed by Shawn Christensen and starring Carey Mulligan.
- The story of the Fox sisters was featured in "Siblings", the sixth episode in season four of Drunk History. Catherine and Maggie Fox were portrayed by Sugar Lyn Beard and Sarah Ramos, respectively.
- Maggie and Catherine make a brief appearance in Dan Simmons' 2007 novel The Terror. As protagonist Francis Crozier suffers through an alcohol withdrawal-induced fever dream, he experiences clairvoyant visions of various attempts to locate Franklin's lost expedition. One of these visions is of the Foxes as children, conducting a séance to find the expedition; another is of Maggie as a young woman, conversing with her lover Elisha Kane, a prominent Franklin searcher.
- Kate and Maggie make an appearance in the Supernatural episode "The Mentalists", where Kate is a good ghost and Maggie is a violent spirit.
