= Henri Robin =

French magician and illusionist (1811–1874)

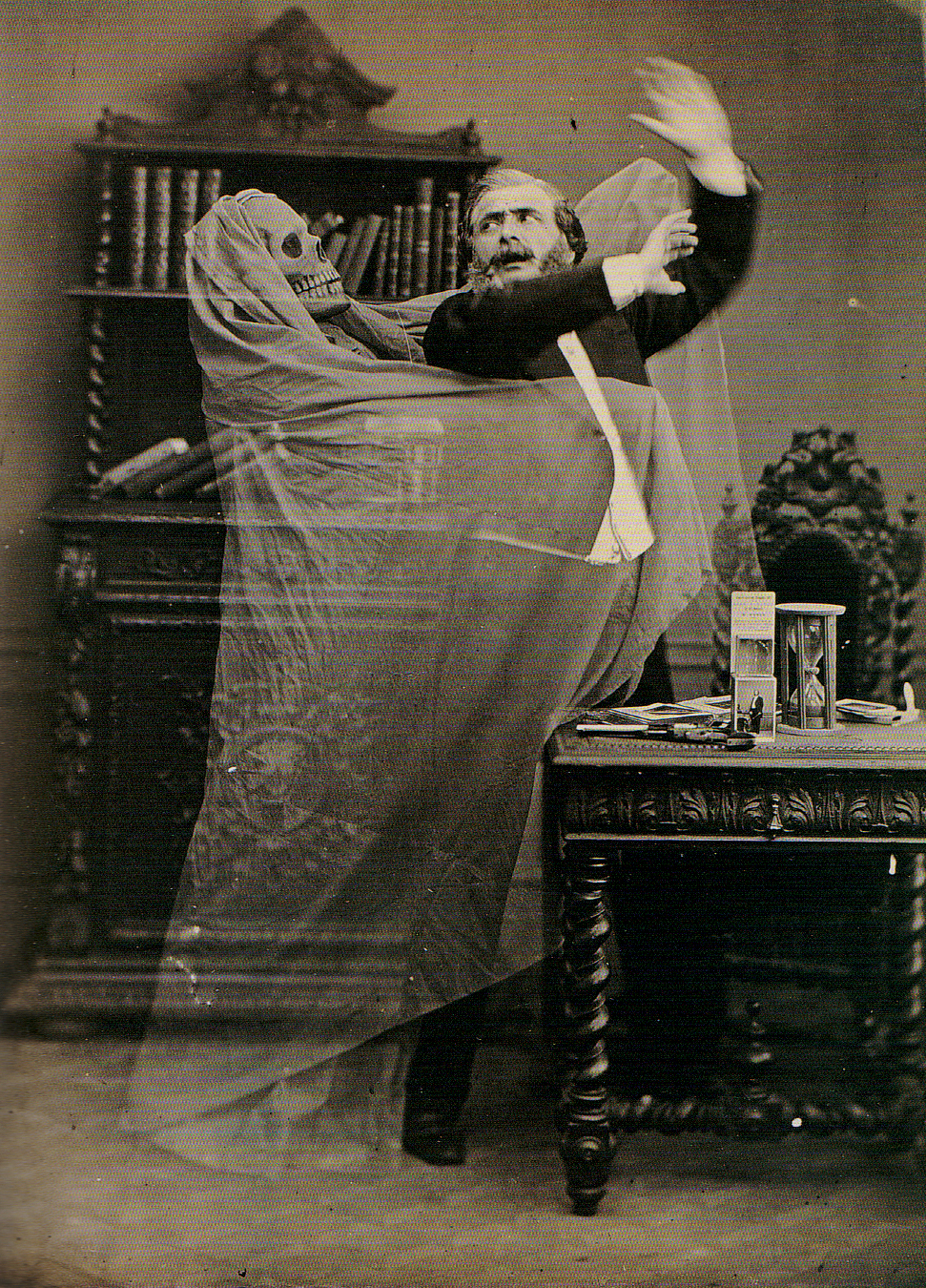
Publicity photography for Henri Robin (1863).

Henri Robin (1811–1874), born Henrik Joseph Donckel, was a French illusionist, born in Hazebrouck. In the early 1850s, he performed at Windsor Castle, at the request of Queen Victoria. In 1861, he became the first illusionist to offer a full programme of magic at Egyptian Hall in London. Between 1862 and 1869, he managed a theatre in the Boulevard du Temple, Paris. His most well-known illusion in these years was "The Medium of Inkerman", in which a drum on stage was apparently struck by an unseen spirit, in response to questions from the audience.
