= Bullet catch =

Stage magic illusion

Dorothy Dietrich (in white) performing her version of the illusion in 1981

The bullet catch is a stage magic illusion in which a magician appears to catch a bullet fired directly at them – often in the mouth, sometimes in the hand or sometimes caught with other items such as a dinner plate. The bullet catch may also be referred to as the bullet trick, defying the bullets or occasionally the gun trick.

== In performance ==
The trick usually involves a gun which is loaded and operated by someone with a knowledge of firearms to convince the audience that no deception is being used. In most instances, the bullet is marked by an audience member so that it can be identified later. Great efforts are usually made to show that the person firing the gun does not come in contact with the person catching the bullet. When magicians Penn & Teller perform the bullet catch, in which each appears to catch a bullet simultaneously shot by the other, a line is drawn down the center of the stage, demonstrating that neither will cross to the other side. When done by Dorothy Dietrich and Ted Annemann, the bullets are purchased by a committee ahead of time, kept under guard until performance time, and the bullets are chosen at random at the time of the performance.

The gun is then fired through a target—usually a pane of glass, which either shatters or is left with a visible hole—to demonstrate that the gun has actually fired a projectile. The performer catching the bullet usually staggers or collapses, apparently as a result of performing such a feat, and then recovers to produce the bullet, often by spitting it onto a plate or tray.

Historical accounts of the bullet catch describe the bullet being caught in a handkerchief, in a bottle, on a plate, or even on the tip of a sword. In more recent times, magicians such as Dorothy Dietrich (1981), and later Criss Angel (2000s) and David Blaine (2008), have appeared to catch the bullet in a metal cup in their mouth. The guns that Penn & Teller use in their effect are fitted with laser sights to add to the suspense and drama of the trick, and the magicians present the bullets still between their teeth, before removing them from their mouths.

== Method ==
As is often the case with magic illusions, there is no single way the bullet catch is performed. The method used varies from performer to performer, and the gun or bullet is rigged in some way. In cases where the bullet is marked by an audience member, the marked bullet is transferred to the performer through sleight-of-hand, or similar markings are made on another bullet by an off-stage assistant, who then transfers it to the performer.

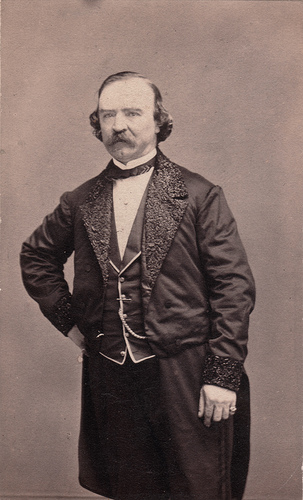
John Henry Anderson, who performed the bullet catch during the 19th century

In the simplest form of the bullet catch, the gun is made to fire blanks, and the pane of glass through which the bullet purportedly passes is set to destruct using a squib. The performer keeps the bullet in their mouth until ready to produce it. Alternatively, if the gun is to be loaded in front of the audience, a wax bullet is loaded into the firearm. The performer uses misdirection to exchange the cartridge containing a genuine bullet with a cartridge containing a wax bullet, and hides the real bullet (which is rigged so it can easily be removed from its brass casing) in their mouth. When the gun is fired, the wax breaks the pane of glass but does not injure the performer.

Another method is to use a muzzle-loading gun, which is loaded by sequentially inserting propellant, wadding, a projectile (normally a lead ball), (Note: "Ball" projectiles used in muzzleloaders are not necessarily round; see for example the Minié ball.) and more wadding into the gun barrel, with the wadding and projectile tamped down with a ramrod. The gun is loaded in front of the audience, often with assistance from an audience member. One variant is based on using a magnetic projectile and a modified ramrod that has a small magnet attached to its tip. The performer uses the ramrod to tamp down wadding and the projectile—the magnet pulls the projectile back out immediately after it has been inserted. The performer then covertly removes it from the ramrod, for display at the end of the illusion. Another method was described in the Chicago Tribune in 1894, in which the ramrod is modified with a small metal tube that is used to capture the projectile while appearing to tamp it down, leaving just propellant and wadding in the gun. As above, the performer then retains the projectile for display after the gun is fired. In another variation of the trick, Scottish magician John Henry Anderson is reported to have exchanged the real projectile with one made from "black lead" (graphite), which was reduced to dust by the action of the ramrod and the firing of the gun. As modern firearms are predominantly breechloading, techniques using a ramrod are virtually obsolete.

Another method was to use an entirely real gun that is genuinely loaded with a lethal projectile, and simply have the shooter intentionally miss the performer, who has previously hidden a bullet in their mouth, as before. This method led to many deaths.

== History ==
One of the earliest documentations of the bullet catch appeared in Jean Chassanion's Histoires mémorables des grans & merveilleux iugements et punitions de Dieu (1586), translated as The Theatre of God's Judgements by Reverend Thomas Beard in 1597. In the source, the magician is considered to have made himself invulnerable by black magic, but a trick by sleight of hand and prepared equipment is clearly being described, despite this misunderstanding. In Beard's version: "It is not long since there was in Lorraine, a certaine man called Coulen, that was overmuch giuen to this cursed Art, amongst whose tricks this was one to be wondred at: that he would suffer Harquebouses or a pistoll to be shot at him, and catch their bullets in his hand without receiving any hurt". God's punishment for this use of the cursed art of black magic follows: "but vpon a certaine time one of his seruants being angry with him, hot him (Note: "hot him" is an obsolete spelling for the past tense of "hit him".) such a knock with a pistoll (notwithstanding all his great cunning) that he killed him therewith".

Throughout the 18th century, variations of the bullet catch were developed by a number of street performers.

In his 1785 book Natural Magic or Physical Amusements Revealed, Philip Astley wrote that he himself had invented the trick in 1762. However, two books published in 1761 mentioned the bullet catch as described by Reverend Beard: The Conjuror Unmasked by Thomas Denton, and La Magie blanche dévoilée by Henri Decremps (the former an English translation of the French text). In fact, Astley's publication plagiarized much of its material from Descremps, including a similar cover illustration, but altered the material to depict conjurers in a more positive light.

Between 1813 and 1818, a troupe known as the 'Indian Jugglers', advertised as being from Seringapatam, included the trick in their shows given in London and Dublin. In 1817 The Times carried a report of a fatal accident in Dublin, allegedly caused when a pistol "actually loaded with powder and ball was, by mistake, substituted for that prepared in the usual way". In a later newspaper item however the chief of the troupe, Mr Ramusamee, denied this story, stating that no-one had ever been killed.

Around 1840, John Henry Anderson began demonstrating the gun trick in theatres throughout Britain. Anderson, or "The Great Wizard of the North" as he was called, performed for P. T. Barnum, Czar Nicholas, Queen Victoria, and Prince Albert and toured in the United States and Australia, thus bringing the bullet catch into mainstream magic illusions. At least four of Anderson's rivals adapted and imitated his trick in their own performances. The American magician John Wyman, also known as "Wyman the Wizard", purchased the technique from Anderson and began performing the trick himself, popularizing it to such a degree that the bullet catch was for a time known as "Wyman's gun trick".

Escape artist and daredevil Harry Houdini announced that he would perform a bullet catch at the New York Hippodrome in April 1918, but did not do so. His decision not to perform the trick is commonly attributed to a letter from Harry Kellar, who wrote to Houdini stating (in part): "And you owe it to your friends and your family to cut out all stuff that entails risk of your life." However, other research attributes Hippodrome management of dissuading Houdini from attempting the illusion. Houdini did claim, during an appearance in Boston in 1922, that he had performed the trick at some point during his career.

=== Injuries and deaths ===
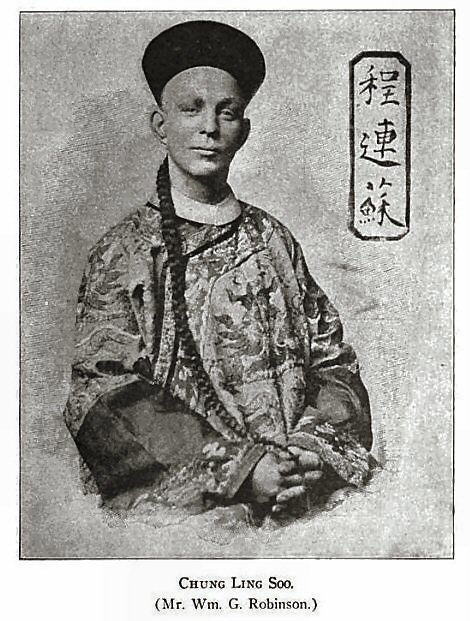
William Ellsworth Robinson as Chung Ling Soo

The bullet catch is arguably one of the most dangerous and daring illusions that a magician can attempt, even when performed in a controlled situation. Legends surround the trick, claiming that at least 12 magicians have been killed while performing it.

Although there are few documented cases of death, there are several accounts of the performer being shot. The number of deaths surrounding the bullet catch has given rise to a story that the trick carries with it a curse to those who attempt to perform it. These magicians often include stories of death, dismemberment and curses as part of the staging of many tricks in order to build up hype.

Thomas Frost in his 1876 book The Lives of the Conjurors wrote of two separate performers in the 1820s, Torrini De Grisy (Note: Count Edmond de Grisy was born in France and performed in Italy under the stage name Torrini.) and De Linsky, who were responsible for the deaths of their son and wife, respectively. In 1869, a performer by the name of Dr. Epstein was killed when the tip of the wand he was using to ram the charge into the gun broke off inside and was subsequently launched at him when the gun was fired.

The best documented instance of a performer being killed while performing the gun trick is the case of Chung Ling Soo (the stage name of the American magician William Ellsworth Robinson), who was killed while performing this trick due to an equipment malfunction. He was fatally injured when a musket altered for use on stage actually fired during a performance in London in 1918. The gun used for the trick was set up to discharge a blank in the ramrod tube below the barrel. However, the gun malfunctioned and the bullet that had been loaded into the main barrel was accidentally fired into Soo's lung. This event ended the popularity of the bullet catch trick for nearly 70 years.

=== Performances in the past century ===
American mentalist Theodore Annemann presented a dramatic outdoor version of the bullet catch throughout his career in the 1930s until his death in 1942.

Ralf Bialla, a German magician, started performing the bullet catch in the 1950s for a fee of 2,000 DM per performance. A .22 caliber rifle was fired, and the bullet appeared to go through a glass pane before Bialla purportedly caught it with his teeth. His safety equipment included protective dentures, glasses, and gloves. He claimed that he was wounded nine times while performing the trick, and that he had two bullets lodged in his body (in his shoulder and back of the throat) as a result. Bialla died in a mountain climbing accident in July 1975, supposedly because of constant dizziness caused by the injuries.

In 1964, Nigel Backhurst (who later performed as Nigel Gordon) developed a version of the bullet catch using a .22 air rifle, which he performed for his membership audition to the Staffordshire Magical Society. He later wrote an article describing the method used in Abracadabra and continued to perform the effect until 2000 with the Theatre of The Damned.

In May 1980, Carl Skenes performed a bullet catch for the That's Incredible! television show. Skenes has asserted that he was "The first performer ever to catch a real bullet with no illusions or gimmicks"—that is, that a .22 caliber bullet really was shot into a metal container he placed in his mouth. Preparation of his version of the bullet catch involved the rifle being supported in a rigid frame, rather than the marksman simply aiming at the performer, as is normally seen. Slow-motion video of Skenes' bullet catch appears to show the path of the bullet into the container in his mouth.

In July 1980, Dorothy Dietrich was booked to perform her version of the bullet catch for the International Brotherhood of Magicians, and to be featured on the TV show Evening Magazine. Her version differed in that she allowed an independent committee to buy and bring the bullets under guard. In 1988, she performed the bullet catch in a performance at Donald Trump's Resorts International in Atlantic City for the casino's 10th anniversary. This was recorded for an Australian television show called Just for the Record, The Best of Everything. On another occasion, she performed the trick on the television show You Asked for It, hosted by Rich Little. On yet another occasion, she performed it for the Canadian Broadcasting Corporation on a show called Autobus du Canada, and received the highest amount ever paid to a magician by Canadian television. She advertised that she was the only woman to perform the bullet catch by catching it in her mouth.

In 2006, the bullet catch trick was tested on the TV show MythBusters. The crew used a slaughtered pig's head to see if it were feasible for a human jaw to withstand the force of a bullet. Despite having stronger teeth than a human, the pig's teeth and jaw were badly damaged. After judging the trick "busted", the crew was challenged to design a precisely timed mechanical bullet catching rig. This device was only modestly successful at catching a bullet, and only after the "jaws" were switched from a human-shaped metal jaw to a longer duckbill one with more surface area. Even with perfect timing aided by ultra-high speed photography, the bullet deteriorated into an almost unrecognizable mass of metal upon impact.

Criss Angel has performed the trick at least twice. In a radio interview with Penn Jillette in February 2006, Angel says there is an unaired performance that was "so believable" that the television network A&E would not broadcast it. In this performance, his musician friend Jonathan Davis appeared to fire a high-powered rifle into a metal cup that was custom-made to fit into Criss' mouth. On episode 3 of Criss Angel BeLIEve, Angel performs a version of the trick using a padded glove.

David Blaine performs a version of the bullet catch in which he purports to catch the bullet in his mouth with a steel shot glass.

=== Notable performers ===
Listed chronologically

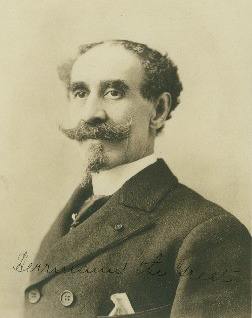
Alexander Herrmann

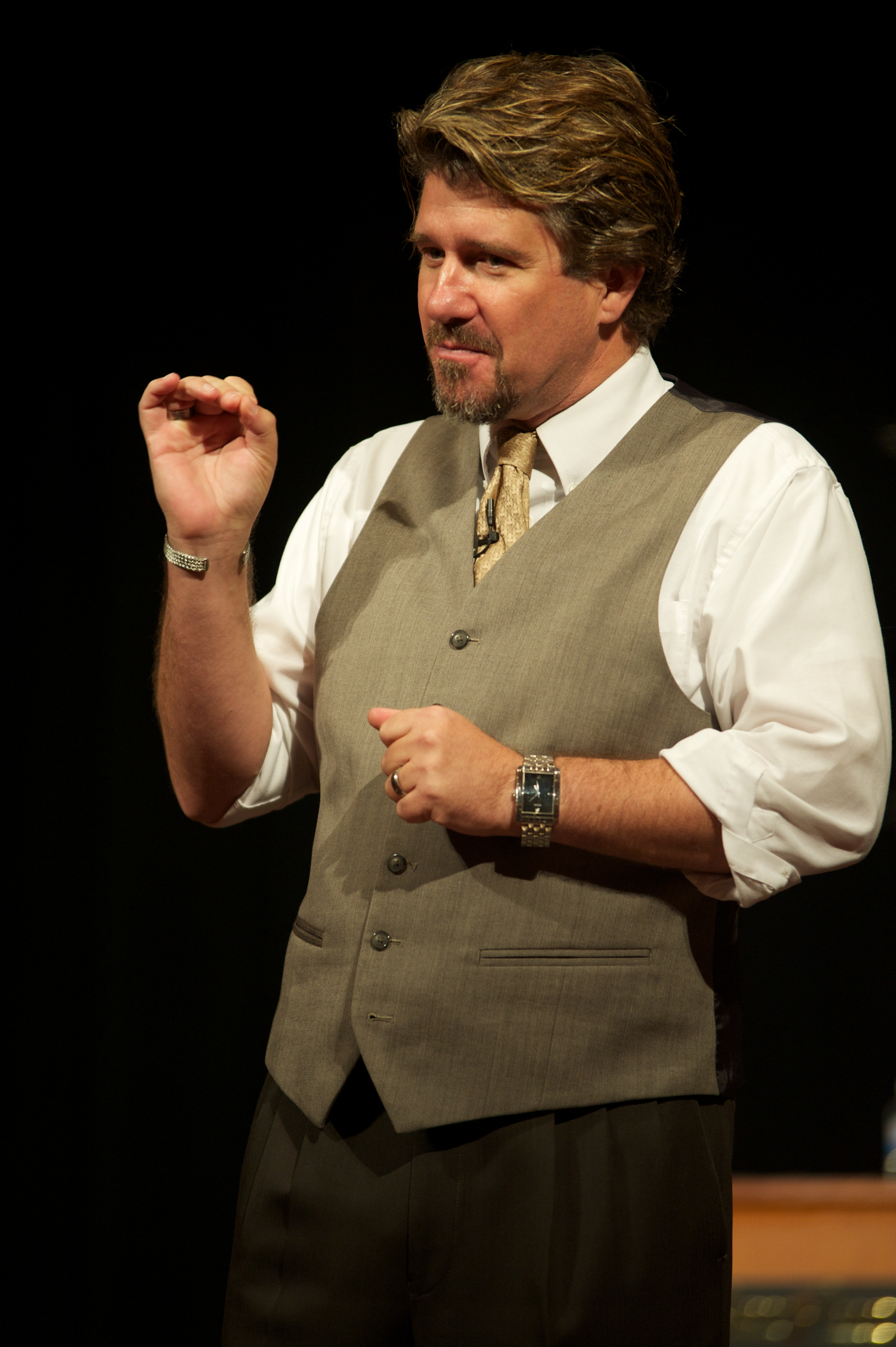
Banachek

- John Henry Anderson (Britain, 1860s)
- Jean-Eugène Robert-Houdin (France, 1860s)
- Alexander Herrmann, stage name Herrmann the Great (United States, 1890s)
- Adelaide Herrmann, stage name the Queen of Magic (United States, 1897)
- Oscar Eliason, stage name Dante The Great (United States and Australasia, 1890s)
- Doc Cunningham (United States, 1890s)
- Chung Ling Soo, real name William Robinson (England, early 1900s), killed while performing in 1918 in London
- Theodore Annemann, stage name Ted Anneman (United States, 1930s)
- Jean Hugard (Australia, 1940s)
- Maurice Fogel (Britain, 1940s–1960s), wounded at least once
- Dorothy Dietrich (United States, 1981)
- Robert Culp and Morgan Fairchild (United States, 1982), on Circus of the Stars
- Paul Daniels (Britain, 1980s)
- Banachek, real name Steven Shaw (United States, 1980s)
- Morgan Strebler (United States, 1990s)
- Val Valentino, stage name the Masked Magician (United States, late 1990s)
- Penn & Teller (United States, 1990s–2010s)
- Joe Labero (Tunisia, 2000s)
- Matt the Knife (United States, 2000s–2010s)
- Criss Angel (United States, 2000s)
- Brock Gill (United States, 2000s)
- David Blaine (United States, 24 September 2008), as a part of "Dive of Death"
- Keith Barry (Ireland, 2010s)
- Steve Cohen (United States, 2012), wounded by a glass shard
