= John Henry Anderson =

Scottish magician (1814–1874)

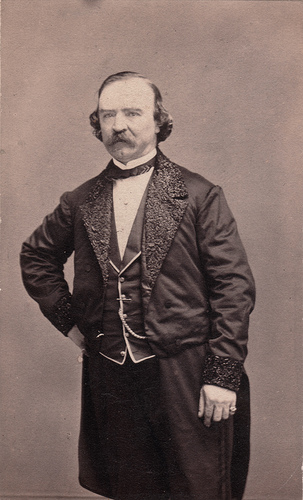
John Henry Anderson, the Wizard of the North

John Henry Anderson (1814–1874) was a Scottish professional magician. Anderson is credited with helping bring the art of magic from street performances into theatres and presenting magic performances to entertain and delight the audience.

== Career ==
Anderson was born near Torphins in Aberdeenshire. Orphaned at the age of ten, he started his career appearing on the stage with a travelling dramatic company in 1830. At seventeen, he began performing magic and in 1837, at the age of twenty-three, he performed at the castle of Lord Panmure, whose endorsement of Anderson inspired him to put a touring show together which lasted for three years. In 1840, Anderson settled in London, opening the New Strand Theatre. Anderson said that Sir Walter Scott gave him the stage name, The Great Wizard of the North.

Anderson's success came from his extensive use of advertising and popular shows which captivated his audience. The Wizard was committed to philanthropy and expert showmanship, making him one of the earliest magicians to attain a high level of world renown. As he declared, "It is the duty of all magicians to give entertainment". He would remove tricks from his performances if they were not enthusiastically received. Anderson is famous for a lifetime of successful performances of the bullet catch illusion. Although he did not invent the trick, he made it widely popular and several of his rivals copied Anderson's version in their own shows. Anderson is also credited to be the first magician to pull a rabbit out of a tophat. The trick had existed before in different forms, yet, Anderson was the first magician that performed this classic trick on stage.

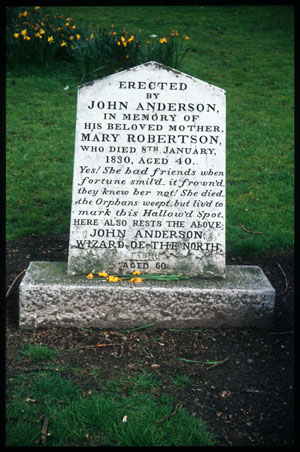
Aberdeen, Scotland: The Grave of John Henry Anderson a.k.a. The Wizard Of The North

In 1842, Anderson married Hannah Longherst from Aberdeen, an assistant with his show. The following year their son John Henry Jr. was born. In 1845, Anderson's mistress Miss Prentice gave birth to Philip Prentice Anderson, but died in childbirth. Anderson, however, supported her child for his entire life. Anderson would also have two daughters – Helen and Alice – who assisted in their father's show and later became successful magicians, and a second illegitimate son with a member of his touring troupe.

1845 also saw the completion of Anderson's second theatre, the City Theatre in Glasgow. In November, only four months after opening, the theatre burned and Anderson's financial losses were considerable. Through the aid of his show business friends, Anderson was able to launch a new show at London's Covent Garden Theatre in 1846 and then toured Europe the following year, travelling to Hamburg, Stockholm, and St. Petersburg, where he met Czar Nicholas I, who arranged a command performance for Anderson after an awkward chance meeting.

In 1849, Anderson returned to London to perform for Queen Victoria and Prince Albert. The following year, Anderson toured America, Canada, Australia, and Hawaii. Upon returning to Britain, Anderson found that he had a rival in fellow magician Robert Houdin.

Robert-Houdin's inventions were pirated by his trusted mechanic Le Grand who was arrested for making and selling duplicate illusions. Many of those illusions fell into the hands of his competitors like The Great Wizard of the North, Robin, and Compars Herrmann. It is not known whether Anderson or the others bought the illusions directly from LeGrand or from another source. But, they willingly performed the illusions after knowing that those were invented by Robert-Houdin.

Herrmann too was performing in London with Robert-Houdin's pirated tricks. Anderson took Houdin's tricks and returned to America in 1853 and performed in Boston. An illusion involving Anderson's dispensing of various alcoholic beverages to the audience caused a legal controversy regarding temperance in that city.

In 1859, after a brief period as an actor, Anderson began another world tour. In 1862, at the age of eighteen, John Henry Jr. left his father's troupe and began his own independent career as a conjuror. This started a bitter feud between father and son and the two never spoke again. Greatly in debt, Anderson returned to England in 1864, and went bankrupt again in 1866.

Anderson died in 1874 at the Fleece Hotel in Darlington, County Durham. He was buried next to his mother in the Kirk of St Nicholas churchyard. Magician Harry Houdini, who was born in the same year as Anderson's death, revered Anderson as one of his inspirations and in 1909 arranged for the upkeep of the gravesite, which had fallen into disrepair.

== Spiritualism ==
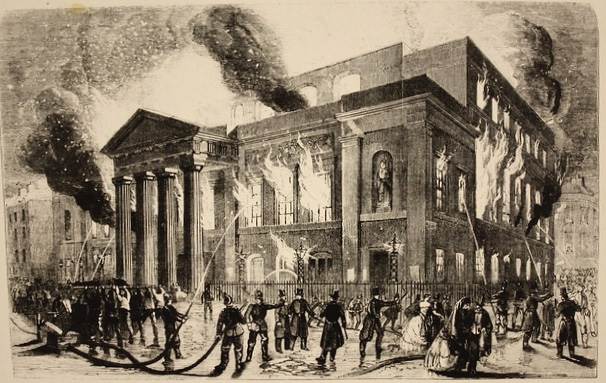
Fire of 1856 at Covent Garden Theatre

In 1854, Anderson held a farewell performance in Aberdeen. The success of this show was enough to inspire Anderson not to retire. Rather, he began to concentrate his efforts on exposing the tricks of mediums and spiritualist fraud. In his shows, he used his daughters to duplicate spiritualist effects. Anderson was one of the magicians of his day who exposed the frauds of the Davenport brothers. The show played at the Lyceum in London and then moved to the Covent Garden theatre in 1855. The following year, after a gala performance and bal masqué the theatre caught fire and was destroyed in the early hours of 5 March 1856, destroying all of Anderson's properties and bankrupting him for the second time in his professional career.

Anderson stated that spiritualism was a "delusion that has driven ten thousand persons mad in the United States."

== Stage Name used by Hind after his death ==
Sometime between 1879 and 1881, self styled "Professor of Magic" Philip Prentis Hind (1844–1920) began using Anderson as his last name and the stage name of Professor Anderson for his magician's act in Australia presenting himself as the successor to the original Wizard of the North. His act included his wife, Louisa, as a clairvoyant.

== Publications ==
- Shilling's Worth of Magic: Or Tricks to be Learnt in a Train (1853)
- The Fashionable Science of Parlour Magic: Being the Newest Tricks of Deception, Developed and Illustrated: With an Exposure of the Practices Made Use of by Professional Card Players, Blacklegs, and Gamblers: To which is Added, for the First Time, the Magic of Spirit Rapping, Writing Mediums, and Table Turning (1855)
- Capital Tricks and Deceptions with Cards (1894)

== See also ==
- Owners, lessees and managers of the Royal Opera House, Covent Garden
