= Susan Sarandon filmography =

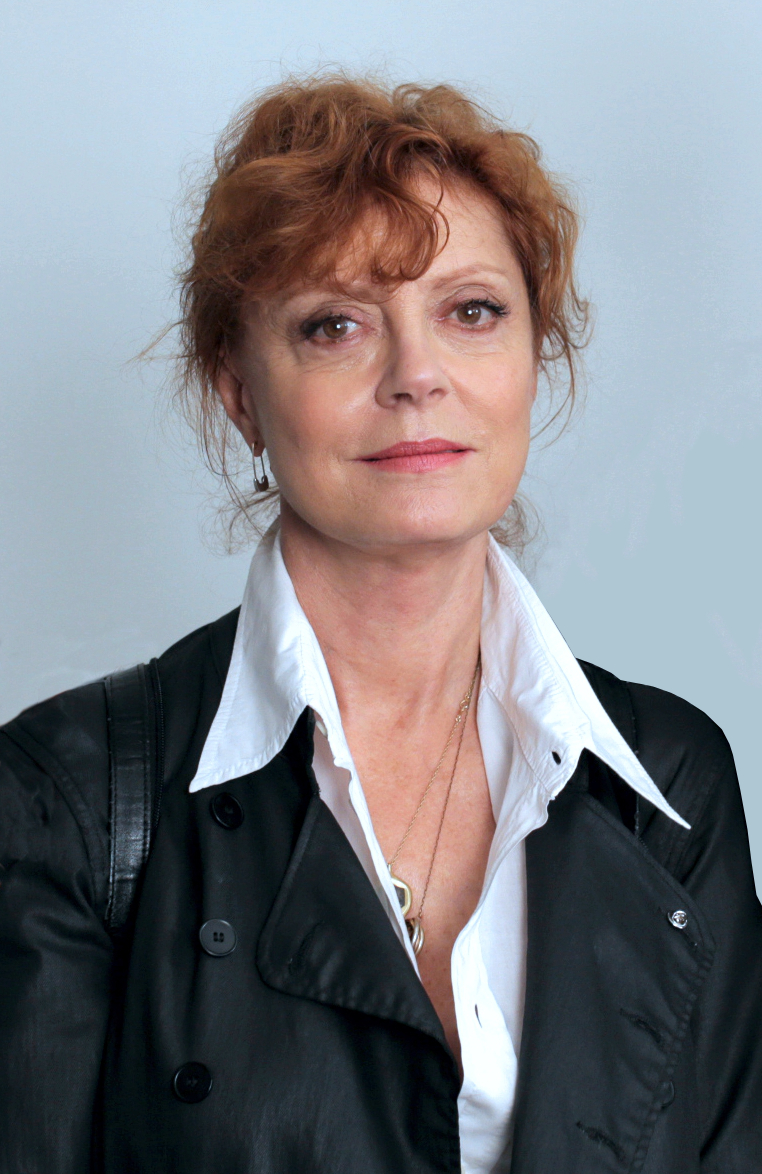
Sarandon in 2016

The following is a list of performances by American actress Susan Sarandon.

== Acting credits ==
=== Film ===
Year	Title	Role	Notes
1970	Joe	Melissa Compton	
1971	Lady Liberty	Sally	
1971	The Apprentice	Elizabeth Hawkins	
1974	Lovin' Molly	Sarah	
1974	The Front Page	Peggy Grant	
1975	The Great Waldo Pepper	Mary Beth	
1975	The Rocky Horror Picture Show	Janet Weiss	
1976	One Summer Love	Chloe Farna	
1977	Checkered Flag or Crash	C.C. Wainwright	
1977	The Other Side of Midnight	Catherine Alexander Douglas	
1977	The Great Smokey Roadblock	Ginny	Also co-producer
1978	Pretty Baby	Hattie	
1978	King of the Gypsies	Rose	
1979	Something Short of Paradise	Madeline Ross	
1980	Atlantic City	Sally Matthews	
1980	Loving Couples	Stephanie Beck	
1982	Tempest	Aretha Tomalin	
1983	The Hunger	Sarah Roberts	
1984	The Buddy System	Emily Price	
1985	Compromising Positions	Judith Singer	
1987	The Witches of Eastwick	Jane Spofford	
1988	Bull Durham	Annie Savoy	
1988	Sweet Hearts Dance	Sandra Boon	
1989	The January Man	Christine Starkey	
1989	A Dry White Season	Melanie Bruwer	
1990	White Palace	Nora Baker	
1991	Thelma & Louise	Louise Sawyer	
1992	The Player	Herself	Cameo
1992	Light Sleeper	Ann	
1992	Bob Roberts	Tawna Titan	
1992	Lorenzo's Oil	Michaela Odone	
1994	The Client	Regina "Reggie" Love	
1994	Little Women	Mrs. March	
1994	Safe Passage	Margaret "Mag" Singer	
1995	Dead Man Walking	Sister Helen Prejean	Won Academy Award
1996	James and the Giant Peach	Miss Spider	Voice
1998	Twilight	Catherine Ames	
1998	Illuminata	Calimene	
1998	Stepmom	Jackie Harrison	Also executive producer
1999	Our Friend, Martin	Mrs. Clark	Voice, direct-to-video
1999	Cradle Will Rock	Margherita Sarfatti	
1999	Anywhere but Here	Adele August	
2000	Joe Gould's Secret	Alice Neel	
2000	Rugrats in Paris: The Movie	Coco LaBouche	Voice
2001	Cats & Dogs	Ivy	Voice
2001	Goodnight Moon	Narrator	Voice, short film
2002	Igby Goes Down	Mimi Slocumb	
2002	The Banger Sisters	Lavinia Kingsley	
2002	Moonlight Mile	Jojo Floss	Also executive producer
2002	Little Miss Spider	Narrator	Voice, short film
2004	Noel	Rose Collins	
2004	Jiminy Glick in Lalawood	Herself	Cameo
2004	Shall We Dance	Beverly Clark	
2004	Alfie	Liz	
2005	Elizabethtown	Hollie Baylor	
2005	Romance & Cigarettes	Kitty Kane Murder	
2006	Irresistible	Sophie Hartley	
2007	Mr. Woodcock	Beverly Farley	
2007	In the Valley of Elah	Joan Deerfield	
2007	Enchanted	Queen Narissa	
2007	Emotional Arithmetic	Melanie Lansing Winters	
2008	Speed Racer	Mom Racer	
2008	Middle of Nowhere	Rhonda Berry	
2009	The Greatest	Grace Brewer	
2009	Leaves of Grass	Daisy Kincaid	
2009	Solitary Man	Nancy Kalmen	
2009	The Lovely Bones	Grandma Lynn	
2010	Wall Street: Money Never Sleeps	Sylvia Moore	
2010	Peacock	Fanny Crill	
2012	Jeff, Who Lives at Home	Sharon Thompkins	
2012	Robot & Frank	Jennifer	
2012	That's My Boy	Mary McGarricle	
2012	Arbitrage	Ellen Miller	
2012	Cloud Atlas	Madame Horrox, Older Ursula, Yosouf Suleiman, Abbess	
2012	The Company You Keep	Sharon Solarz	
2013	Snitch	District Attorney Joanne Keeghan	
2013	The Big Wedding	Bebe McBride	
2013	The Last of Robin Hood	Florence Aadland	
2014	Tammy	Pearl Balzen	
2014	Ping Pong Summer	Randy Jammer	
2014	The Calling	Hazel Micallef	
2015	Hell and Back	Barb The Angel	Voice
2015	The Meddler	Marnie Minervini	Also executive producer
2015	3 Generations	Dolly	
2016	Zoolander 2	Herself	Uncredited cameo
2016	April and the Extraordinary World	Chimene	Voice
2016	Mothers and Daughters	Millie	
2016	Spark	Bananny	Voice
2016	Ace the Case	Detective Dottie Wheel	
2016	My Entire High School Sinking into the Sea	Lunch Lady Lorraine	Voice
2017	A Bad Moms Christmas	Isis Dunkler	
2018	The Death & Life of John F. Donovan	Grace Donovan	
2018	Viper Club	Helen	
2019	Blackbird	Lily	
2019	VHYes	Tracy Beth	Also executive producer
2019	The Jesus Rolls	Jean	
2020	Fearless	Mom	
2021	Jolt	Woman With No Name	
2021	Ride the Eagle	Honey	
2022	Forty Winks	Connie Montoya	
2023	Maybe I Do	Monica	
2023	Blue Beetle	Victoria Kord	
2024	The Gutter	Linda Curson	
2024	Gracie & Pedro: Pets to the Rescue	Shades	Voice
2024	The Fabulous Four	Lou	
2024	The Six Triple Eight	Eleanor Roosevelt	
2025	Nonnas	Gia	
2026	The Accompanist	Sylvia	
2026	The Echo Chamber	Ava	

=== Television ===
Year	Title	Role	Notes
1971	A World Apart	Patrice Kahlman	1 episode
1971	Owen Marshall, Counselor at Law	Joyce	Episode: "Burden of Proof"
1972	Search for Tomorrow	Sarah Fairbanks	1 episode
1974	F. Scott Fitzgerald and 'The Last of the Belles'	Ailie Calhoun	Television film
1974	The Satan Murders	Kate	Television film
1974	June Moon	Eileen	Television film
1974	The Rimers of Eldritch	Pasty Johnson	Television film
1975	The Haunting of Rosalind		Television film
1982	American Playhouse	Helene Shaw	Episode: "Who Am I This Time?"
1984	Oxbridge Blues	Natalie	Episode: "He'll See You Now"
1984	Faerie Tale Theatre	Beauty	Episode: "Beauty And The Beast"
1985	A.D	Livilla	5 episodes
1985	Mussolini and I	Edda Mussolini Ciano	Television film
1986	Women of Valor	Colonel Margaret Ann Jessup	Television film
1989–1996	Sesame Street	Herself	9 episodes
1994	All Star 25th Birthday: Stars and Street Forever!	Bitsy	Television special
1995	The Simpsons	Ballet Teacher	Voice, episode: "Homer vs. Patty and Selma"
1999	Earthly Possessions	Charlotte Emory	Television film
1999	Behind the Music	Herself	Episode: "The Rocky Horror Picture Show"
2001	Friends	Cecilia Monroe	Episode: "The One With Joey's New Brain"
2001	Cool Women in History	Herself (host and executive producer)	Season 1
2002	Malcolm in the Middle	Meg	2 episodes
2003	Ice Bound: A Woman's Survival at the South Pole	Dr. Jerri Nielsen	Television film
2003	Frank Herbert's Children of Dune	Princess Wensicia	3 episodes
2004	Troy: The Passion of Helen	Herself (host)	Television documentary
2005	The Exonerated	Sunny Jacobs	Television film
2005	Mad TV	Various roles	2 episodes
2006	The Simpsons	Herself	Voice, episode: "Bart Has Two Mommies"
2006–2007	Rescue Me	Alicia Green	6 episodes
2007	Bernard and Doris	Doris Duke	Television film
2009, 2011	Saturday Night Live	Mother	Uncredited; 2 episodes
2009	ER	Nora	Episode: "Old Times"
2010	You Don't Know Jack	Janet Good	Television film
2011–2012	30 Rock	Lynn Onkman	2 episodes
2012	The Big C	Joy The Joyologist	6 episodes
2012	Louie	Herself	Episode: "Late Show: Part 3"
2013–2014	Mike & Molly	J.C. Small	2 episodes
2014	Doll & Em	Herself	Episode: "Two"
2015	The Secret Life of Marilyn Monroe	Gladys	2 episodes
2015	Moonbeam City	Ice Ivory	Voice, episode: "The Legend of Circuit Lake"
2016	Cassius and Clay		Voice, pilot
2016	American Dad!	Mrs. Jasperterian	Voice, episode: "Portrait of Francine's Genitals"
2016–2017	Skylanders Academy	Golden Queen	Voice, 6 episodes
2017	Feud: Bette and Joan	Bette Davis	8 episodes; also co-producer
2017–2023	Rick and Morty	Dr. Wong	Voice, 4 episodes
2017–2019	Ray Donovan	Samantha Winslow	16 episodes
2017–2018	Neo Yokio	Aunt Agatha	Voice, 7 episodes
2019	At Home with Amy Sedaris	Susan Sarandon	Episode: "Anniversary"
2019	Robot Chicken	Louise, Chloe, Gen Z Advertising Executive, Handmaid	Voice, episode: "Ginger Hill in: Bursting Pipes"
2019	Magic for Humans	Herself	Episode: "Christmas"
2021	Search Party	Lylah	2 episodes
2022	Monarch	Dottie Cantrell Roman	Main role
2023	C*A*U*G*H*T	Alaska Adams	6 episodes
2023	Krapopolis	Demeter	Voice, episode: "Please Demeter"
TBA	Army of Shadows †		Upcoming series

=== Theatre ===
Year	Title	Role	Venue	Ref.
1972	An Evening with Richard Nixon and...	Ensemble/Others	Shubert Theatre, Broadway	
2009	Exit the King	Queen Marguerite	Ethel Barrymore Theatre, Broadway	
2019	Happy Talk	Lorraine	Pershing Square Signature Center, Off-Broadway	
2025	Mary Page Marlowe	Mary Page Marlowe (59, 63 and 69)	The Old Vic, London	

=== Documentaries ===
Year	Title	Role
1983	When the Mountains Tremble	Herself
1990	Through the Wire	Narrator
1993	Wilderness: The Last Stand	Narrator
1994	School of the Americas Assassins	Narrator
1995	The Celluloid Closet	Herself
1995	One Woman One Vote	Narrator
1996	Tell the Truth and Run: George Seldes and the American Press	Narrator
1997	The Need to Know	Narrator
1997	Father Roy: Inside the School of Assassins	Narrator
1997	187: Documented	Narrator
1999	For Love of Julian	Narrator
2000	Light Keeps Me Company	Herself
2000	Iditarod: A Far Distant Place	Narrator
2000	Mythos	Narrator
2000	This Is What Democracy Looks Like	Narrator
2000	Dying to be Thin	Narrator
2001	Uphill All the Way	Narrator
2001	900 Women	Narrator
2001	The Shaman's Apprentice	Narrator
2001	Rudyland	Narrator
2001	Islamabad: Rock City	Narrator
2001	Ghosts of Attica	Narrator
2001	The Party's Over	Herself
2002	The Next Industrial Revolution	Narrator
2002	Tibet: Cry of the Snow Lion	Narrator
2003	XXI Century	Herself
2003	The Nazi Officer's Wife	Narrator
2003	Burma: Anatomy of Terror	Narrator
2003	Journey of the Heart: The Life of Henri Nouwen	Narrator
2004	Fragile Hopes from the Killing Fields	Narrator
2005	A Whale in Montana	Narrator
2005	On the Line: Dissent in an Age of Terrorism	Herself
2006	Secrets of the Code	Narrator
2006	Christa McAuliffe: Reach for the Stars	Narrator
2006	Home	Herself
2007	This Child of Mine	Narrator
2007	Beyond Wiseguys: Italian Americans & the Movies	Herself
2007	Coming Home	Herself
2008	A War in Hollywood	Herself
2009	PoliWood	Herself
2010	Who Do You Think You Are?	Herself
2014	Unity	Narrator
2015	Connected	Herself
2017	Bombshell: The Hedy Lamarr Story	Executive producer only
2017	Soufra	Executive producer only
2017	Up To Us	Herself
2018	Survivors Guide to Prison	Narrator; also producer
2018	American Mirror	Herself, model
2018	Death Row Stories	Narrator; also producer
2023	Materia Viva	Herself
2025	Strange Journey: The Story of Rocky Horror	Herself

=== Radio ===
Year	Title	Voice role	Ref.
2021	Marvel's Wastelanders	Natasha Romanova/Black Widow/"Helen Black"	

=== Video games ===
Year	Title	Voice role	Ref.
2012	Dishonored	Granny Rags	

=== Music videos ===
Year	Artist	Title	Album	Ref.
2009	The Lonely Island	"Motherlover"	Turtleneck & Chain	
2016	Justice	"Fire"	Woman	
2017	Jay-Z	"Legacy"	4:44	
2020	Julia Stone	"Dance"	Sixty Summers	

== See also ==
- List of awards and nominations received by Susan Sarandon
