= List of awards and nominations received by Susan Sarandon =

Susan Sarandon awards and nominations
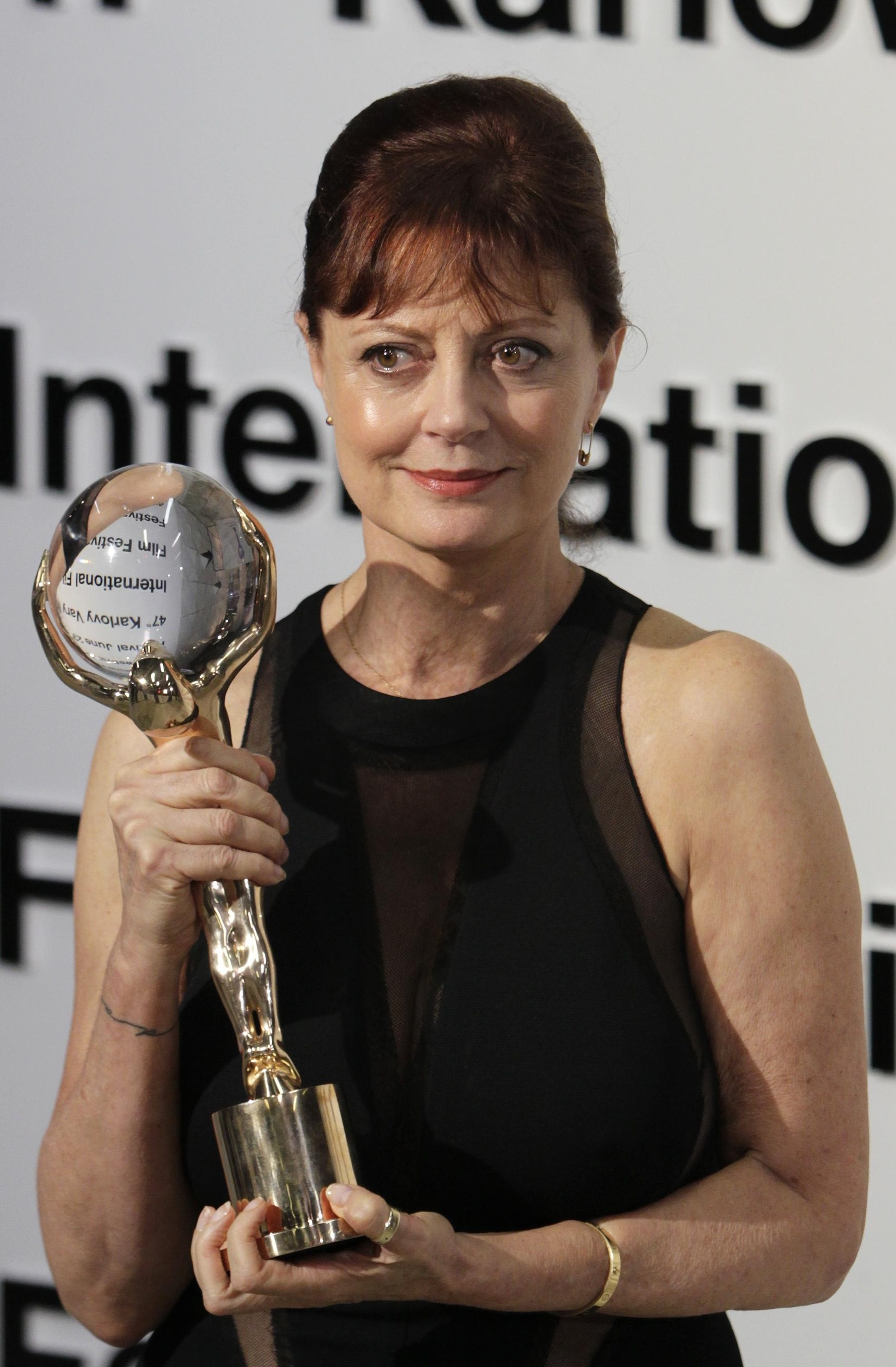
- Sarandon at the Karlovy Vary International Film Festival in 2012
Awards and nominations
Award	Wins	Nominations
Academy Awards	1	5
BAFTA Awards	1	2
Emmy Awards	0	7
Golden Globe Awards	0	10
Grammy Awards	0	1
Screen Actors Guild Awards	1	6

Totals (Note: Certain award groups do not simply award one winner. They acknowledge several different recipients, have runners-up, and have third place. Since this is a specific recognition and is different from losing an award, runner-up mentions are considered wins in this award tally. For simplification and to avoid errors, each award in this list has been presumed to have had a prior nomination.)
- Wins: 36
- Nominations: 100

The following is a list of awards and nominations received by Susan Sarandon.

Susan Sarandon is American actress. Known for her portrayals of headstrong leading women in film and television, she has received various accolades including an Academy Award, a British Academy Film Award, and a Screen Actors Guild Award as well as nominations for six Primetime Emmy Awards, a Daytime Emmy Award, ten Golden Globe Awards and a Grammy Award.

Sarandon took an early role where she played young waitress in the Louis Malle romantic crime drama Atlantic City (1980) for which she was nominated for the Academy Award for Best Actress. She took the role of the romantic lead in the Ron Shelton directed sports drama Bull Durham (1988) for which she was nominated for the Golden Globe Award for Best Actress in a Motion Picture – Musical or Comedy. She played a sharp tongued waitress in the Ridley Scott directed crime drama Thelma & Louise (1991) for which she earned nominations for the Academy Award for Best Actress, the BAFTA Award for Best Actress in a Leading Role and the Golden Globe Award for Best Actress in a Motion Picture – Drama. She portrayed Michaela Odone in the George Miller directed drama Lorenzo's Oil (1992), for which she was nominated for the Academy Award for Best Actress and the Golden Globe Award for Best Actress in a Motion Picture – Drama.

She played a recovering alcoholic and lawyer in the Joel Schumacher directed legal drama The Client earning the BAFTA Award for Best Actress in a Leading Role as well as nominations for the Academy Award, the and the Golden Globe Award, and Screen Actors Guild Award for Best Actress. She won widespread acclaim for her role as a concerned nun Sister Helen Prejean in the Tim Robbins directed crime drama Dead Man Walking (1995) for which she won the Academy Award for Best Actress and the Screen Actors Guild Award for Outstanding Actress in a Leading Role. She received further Golden Globe-nominations for Best Actress in a Motion Picture – Drama for the comedy-drama Stepmom (1998) and the Best Supporting Actress – Motion Picture for the comedy-drama Igby Goes Down (2002).

On television, she earned six Primetime Emmy Award nominations for her performances as a soap opera diva in the NBC sitcom Friends (2001), Meg Burbank in the Fox sitcom Malcolm in the Middle (2002), a wealthy woman in the HBO television film Bernard and Doris (2008), a right-to-die advocate and patient in the HBO television film You Don't Knock Jack (2010), and Bette Davis in the FX limited series Feud: Bette and Joan (2017). She was nominated for the Grammy Award for Best Spoken Word Album for Children for Dinosongs: Poems to Celebrate a T. Rex Named Sue (2001).

== Major associations ==
=== Academy Awards ===
Year	Category	Nominated work	Result	Ref.
1982	Best Actress	Atlantic City	Nominated	
1992	Best Actress	Thelma & Louise	Nominated	
1993	Best Actress	Lorenzo's Oil	Nominated	
1995	Best Actress	The Client	Nominated	
1996	Best Actress	Dead Man Walking	Won	

=== BAFTA Awards ===
Year	Category	Nominated work	Result	Ref.
British Academy Film Awards
1992	Best Actress in a Leading Role	Thelma & Louise	Nominated	
1995	Best Actress in a Leading Role	The Client	Won	

=== Emmy Awards ===
Year	Category	Nominated work	Result	Ref.
Primetime Emmy Awards
2001	Outstanding Guest Actress in a Comedy Series	Friends	Nominated	
2002	Outstanding Guest Actress in a Comedy Series	Malcolm in the Middle	Nominated	
2008	Outstanding Lead Actress in a Limited Series or Movie	Bernard and Doris	Nominated	
2010	Outstanding Supporting Actress in a Limited Series or Movie	You Don't Know Jack	Nominated	
2017	Outstanding Limited Series (as a producer)	Feud: Bette and Joan	Nominated	
2017	Outstanding Lead Actress in a Limited Series or Movie	Feud: Bette and Joan	Nominated	
Daytime Emmy Awards
2002	Outstanding Special Class Series (as a producer)	Cool Women in History	Nominated	

=== Golden Globe Awards ===
Year	Category	Nominated work	Result	Ref.
1989	Best Actress in a Motion Picture – Musical or Comedy	Bull Durham	Nominated	
1991	Best Actress in a Motion Picture – Drama	White Palace	Nominated	
1992	Best Actress in a Motion Picture – Drama	Thelma & Louise	Nominated	
1993	Best Actress in a Motion Picture – Drama	Lorenzo's Oil	Nominated	
1996	Best Actress in a Motion Picture – Drama	Dead Man Walking	Nominated	
1999	Best Actress in a Motion Picture – Drama	Stepmom	Nominated	
2003	Best Supporting Actress – Motion Picture	Igby Goes Down	Nominated	
2009	Best Actress in a Miniseries or Motion Picture – Television	Bernard and Doris	Nominated	
2018	Best Actress in a Miniseries or Motion Picture – Television	Feud: Bette and Joan	Nominated	
2018	Best Miniseries or Television Film	Feud: Bette and Joan	Nominated	

=== Grammy Awards ===
Year	Category	Nominated work	Result	Ref.
2001	Best Spoken Word Album for Children	Dinosongs: Poems to Celebrate a T. Rex Named Sue	Nominated	

=== Screen Actors Guild Awards ===
Year	Category	Nominated work	Result	Ref.
1995	Outstanding Actress in a Leading Role	The Client	Nominated	
1996	Outstanding Actress in a Leading Role	Dead Man Walking	Won	
2009	Outstanding Actress in a Miniseries or Television Movie	Bernard and Doris	Nominated	
2011	Outstanding Actress in a Miniseries or Television Movie	You Don't Know Jack	Nominated	
2016	Outstanding Actress in a Miniseries or Television Movie	The Secret Life of Marilyn Monroe	Nominated	
2018	Outstanding Actress in a Miniseries or Television Movie	Feud: Bette and Joan	Nominated	

== Miscellaneous awards ==
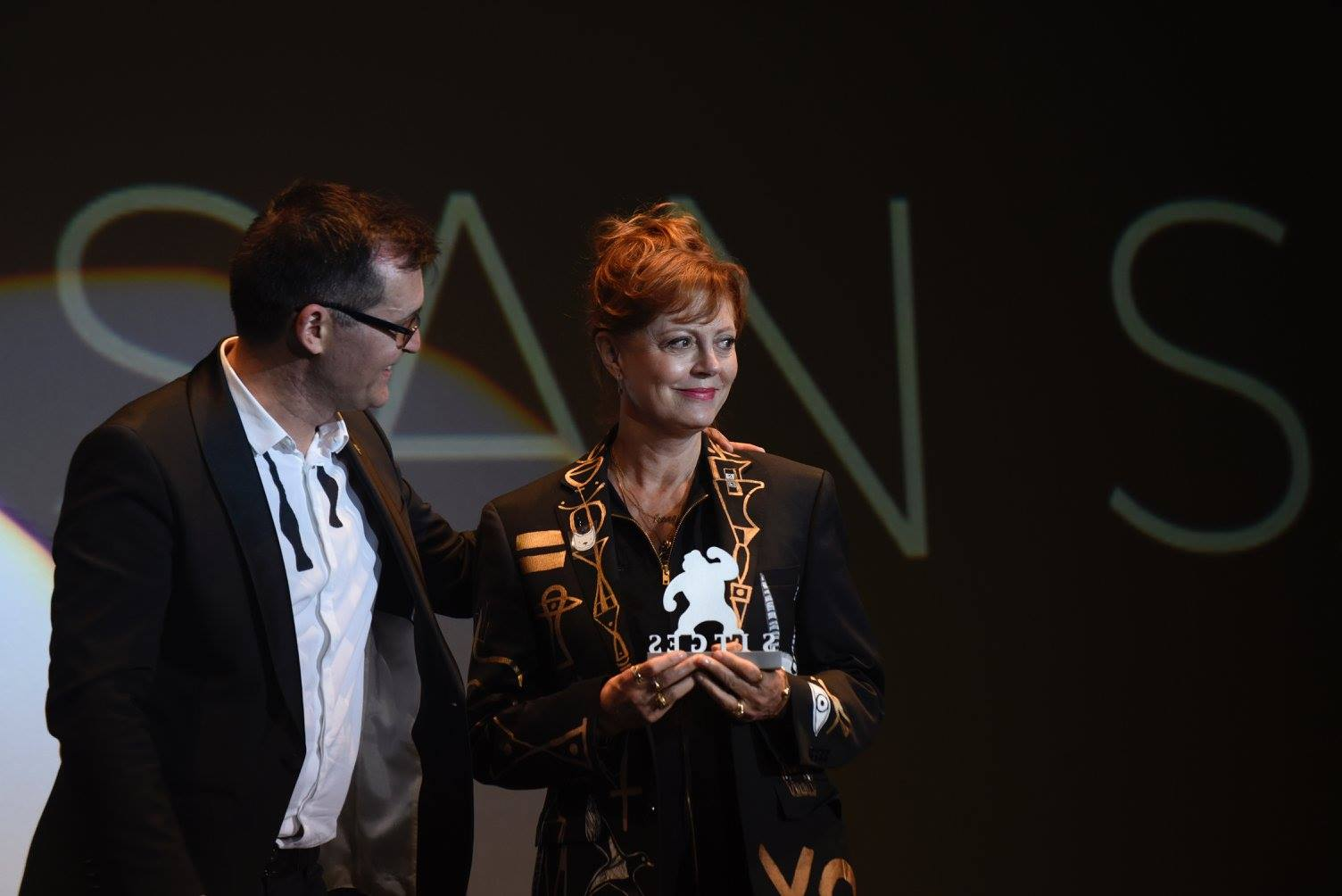
Sarandon receiving the Sitges Film Festival's Grand Honorary Prize in October 2017

Organizations	Year	Category	Nominated work	Result	Ref.
Alice nella città	2026	Womenlands Excellence Award	—N/a	Honored	
Cairo International Film Festival	2008	Career Achievement Award	—N/a	Honored	
Goya Awards	2026	International Goya Award	—N/a	Honored	
Karlovy Vary International Film Festival	2012	Crystal Globe for Outstanding Contribution to World Cinema (Note: Co-recipient alongside Helen Mirren.)	—N/a	Honored	
Razzie Awards	2012	Worst Screen Couple (Note: Shared with Leighton Meester, Andy Samberg, and Adam Sandler.)	That's My Boy	Nominated	
Razzie Awards	2014	Worst Supporting Actress	Tammy	Nominated	
Razzie Awards	2017	Worst Supporting Actress	A Bad Moms Christmas	Nominated	
Satellite Awards	1998	Best Actress – Motion Picture	Stepmom	Nominated	
Satellite Awards	2008	Best Actress – Miniseries or Television Film	Bernard and Doris	Nominated	
Satellite Awards	2017	Best Actress – Miniseries or Television Film	Feud: Bette and Joan	Nominated	
Saturn Awards	1987	Best Actress	The Witches of Eastwick	Nominated	
Saturn Awards	2009	Best Supporting Actress	The Lovely Bones	Nominated	
Sitges Film Festival	2017	Grand Honorary Prize	—N/a	Honored	

== Critics awards ==
Year	Award	Category	Work	Result	Ref.
1981	Kansas City Film Critics Circle	Best Actress	Atlantic City	Won	
1991	London Film Critics Circle	Actress of the Year	White Palace	Won	
1991	London Film Critics Circle	Actress of the Year	Thelma & Louise	Won	
1991	National Board of Review	Best Actress (Note: Shared with Geena Davis for the same film.)	Thelma & Louise	Won	
1991	New York Film Critics Circle	Best Actress	Thelma & Louise	Nominated	
1992	Dallas–Fort Worth Film Critics Association	Best Actress	Thelma & Louise	Nominated	
1992	National Society of Film Critics	Best Actress	Thelma & Louise	Nominated	
1992	Chicago Film Critics Association	Best Actress	Thelma & Louise	Nominated	
1993	Chicago Film Critics Association	Best Actress	Lorenzo's Oil	Nominated	
1992	New York Film Critics Circle	Best Actress	Lorenzo's Oil	Nominated	
1993	National Society of Film Critics	Best Actress	Lorenzo's Oil	Nominated	
1993	National Society of Film Critics	Best Actress	Light Sleeper	Nominated	
1995	Kansas City Film Critics Circle	Best Actress	Dead Man Walking	Won	
1998	San Diego Film Critics Society	Best Actress	Stepmom	Won	
2002	Las Vegas Film Critics Society	Best Supporting Actress	Moonlight Mile	Won	
2002	Las Vegas Film Critics Society	Best Supporting Actress	Igby Goes Down	Won	
2002	Dallas–Fort Worth Film Critics Association	Best Supporting Actress	Igby Goes Down	Nominated	
2004	Women Film Critics Circle	Acting & Activism Award	—N/a	Honored	
2007	Alliance of Women Film Journalists	Humanitarian Activism Award	—N/a	Honored	
2016	Indiana Film Journalists Association	Best Actress	The Meddler	Nominated	
2017	Television Critics Association Awards	Individual Achievement in Drama	Feud: Bette and Joan	Nominated	

== See also ==
- Susan Sarandon filmography
