= List of nonlinear narrative television series =

Nonlinear narrative is a storytelling technique in which the events are depicted, for example, out of chronological order, or in other ways where the narrative does not follow the direct causality pattern of the events featured, such as parallel distinctive plot lines, dream immersions, flashbacks, flashforwards or narrating another story inside the main plot-line.

In television, there are several examples of works that use this kind of narrative, although not all of them use it in the same way. In spite of it being more commonly used on dramas, it can also be found on comedies.

This technique is used for different purposes, such as serving as a narrative hook, to mimic human memory or to explore the past of the story without leaving its present completely aside. In addition, not all television series use this technique in the same extent; some of them use it only in certain episodes, e.g. Fringe, others only in certain seasons, e.g. Breaking Bad, while others do throughout their entire run, e.g. Lost.

== 1950s ==
Year	Title	Genre	Distributor	Notes	Ref
1959–1963	The Untouchables	Crime drama	ABC		

== 1980s ==
Year	Title	Genre	Distributor	Notes	Ref
1989–present	The Simpsons	Animated sitcom	Fox	Features flashback and flashforward episodes, dream immersions and scattered narrative. Characters do not age and few things fundamentally change between episodes, although episodes refer to one another's events in complex ways. Continuity is deliberately broken, with minor characters' backstories being revised frequently.	

== 1990s ==
Year	Title	Genre	Distributor	Notes	Ref
1990–1991	Twin Peaks	Drama	ABC	Part 8 includes fragmented dream-like sequences.	
1993–2002, 2016–2018	The X-Files	Drama	FOX	Features nonlinear narrative with several flashback episodes.	
1994–2004	Friends	Sitcom	NBC	Features several flashback episodes such as "The One with the Flashback", "The One With The Invitation", and "The One with All the Thanksgivings"	
1997–2003	Buffy the Vampire Slayer	Supernatural teen drama	The WB	Features nonlinear narrative particularly from season 2 onwards	
1999–2004	Angel	Supernatural drama	The WB	Features flashbacks	
1999–2007	The Sopranos	Crime drama	HBO	Features flashbacks in certain episodes, such as "Down Neck"	

== 2000s ==
Year	Title	Genre	Distributor	Notes	Ref
2002	Firefly	Science fiction western	Fox	Only in episode "Out of Gas"	
2000–2006	Malcolm in the Middle	Comedy	Fox	Mainly through the use of flashbacks, especially episodes "Flashback" and "Bowling"	
2000–2004	Coupling	Comedy	BBC Two	Some episodes include split‑screen sequences (e.g, "Split"; series 3, episode 1) and scenes replayed from different characters’ perspectives (e.g. "9½ Minutes"; series 4, episode 1, and "The Girl with Two Breasts"; series 1, episode 5.	
2002	Boomtown	Action-drama	NBC	The show tells the same events from different characters' perspectives, which makes the story unfold in a non-linear way	
2002–2017	Naruto and Naruto: Shippuden	Animated; Martial arts	TXN (TV Tokyo)	Used numerous flashbacks, filler arcs, and standalone story arcs	
2003–2012	One Tree Hill	Drama	The WB; The CW	Used timejumps in season 5, 7, and 9	
2003–2006; 2013–2019	Arrested Development	Comedy	Fox (season 1-3); Netflix (season 4-5)	Especially season 4	
2004–2010	House	Medical drama	Fox	Features flashbacks in certain episodes, such as "Two Stories", "Three Stories", and "Lockdown".	
2004–2010	Lost	Drama	ABC	Features three main storylines; the past, the present and an alternative present	
2005–present	Doctor Who	Science fiction drama	BBC	Features time travel and flashbacks	
2005–2014	How I Met Your Mother	Comedy	CBS	Features flashbacks, flashforwards and unreliable narrators	
2006–2013	30 Rock	Comedy	NBC	Mainly through the use of flashbacks and smash cuts.	
2006–2010	Heroes	Drama	NBC	Disjointed, parallel plotlines that jump across space and time, using frequent flashbacks, flash-forwards, and the fragmentation of a large ensemble cast to slowly reveal a single, interconnected fate	
2007–2009	Transformers Animated	Animated Superhero	Cartoon Network	Through the use of flashbacks	
2007–2012	Damages	Drama	FX	Some episodes “disrupts linearity and chronology through constant flashbacks and flashforwards”	
2008–2013	Breaking Bad	Drama	AMC	Only "Pilot", season 2 and season 5	
2009–2011	Ezel	Crime drama	Show TV; ATV	Particularly season 1, and selected episodes of season 2. Features extensive flashbacks.	
2009–2010	FlashForward	Drama	ABC	Global flashforward premise	
2009–2017	The Vampire Diaries	Fantasy drama	The CW	Features flashbacks and flashforwards	

== 2010s ==
=== 2010 ===
Year	Title	Genre	Distributor	Notes	Ref
2010–2014	Boardwalk Empire	Period drama	HBO	Only episode "Under God's Power She Flourishes" and season 5	
2010	The Event	Science fiction	NBC	The pilot is described as a "chronological puzzle", "Flashbacks and jumping timeline"	
2010–2022	The Walking Dead	Horror drama	AMC	Features flashbacks and parallel story lines	
2010–2017	Pretty Little Liars	Teen drama	ABC Family	Features flashbacks	

=== 2011 ===
Year	Title	Genre	Distributor	Notes	Ref
2011–present	American Horror Story	Horror drama	FX	Flashbacks and dream immersions	
2011–2018	New Girl	Sitcom	Fox	Features flashbacks particularly in certain episodes, such as "Virgins"	
2011–2016	Person of Interest	Science fiction	CBS	Features extensive use of flashbacks and in media res	
2011–2018	Once Upon a Time	Fantasy drama	ABC	Features extensive use of flashbacks	

=== 2012 ===
Year	Title	Genre	Distributor	Notes	Ref
2012	Alcatraz	Science fiction	Fox	Only through the use of flashbacks and flash-forwards	
2012–2020	Arrow	Superhero	The CW	Mainly through the use of flashbacks and flashforwards	
2012	Son	Thriller	ATV		
2012–2014	Revolution	Science fiction	NBC		
2012	The Returned	Drama	Canal+	Narrative unfolds over time using symbolic moments that reveal past event's impact on the present, requiring viewers to piece together meaning rather than to following a linear plot	

=== 2013 ===
Year	Title	Genre	Distributor	Notes	Ref
2013–2023	Attack on Titan	Action drama	MBS, NHK	The series features several flashbacks, while its extra episodes (or OVA) are all anachronic.	
2013	20 Dakika	Thriller	Star TV		
2013–2014	Once Upon a Time in Wonderland	Fantasy drama	ABC		
2013	Deception	Soap opera	NBC		
2013–2015	Hannibal	Drama	NBC	Especially season 3	
2013	Golden Boy	Drama	CBS		
2013–2017	Orphan Black	Science fiction	BBC America	Especially season 4	
2013–2019	Orange Is the New Black	Comedy drama	Netflix	Mainly through the use of flashbacks	
2013–2018	The Originals	Fantasy drama	The CW	Extensive use of flashbacks	
2013–2019	Ray Donovan	Drama	Showtime	Features flashbacks	

=== 2014 ===
Year	Title	Genre	Distributor	Notes	Ref
2014–2020	The 100	Science fiction	The CW	Mainly through the use of flashbacks	
2014–2020	BoJack Horseman	Adult animation	Netflix	Mainly through the use of flashbacks and dream immersions	
2014–2022	Black-ish	Comedy	ABC	Mainly though the use of flashbacks	
2014–2019	Gotham	Crime-drama	Fox	Only certain episodes, such as "Spirit of the Goat"	
2014–2019	Jane the Virgin	Comedy drama	The CW	Every episode features a flashback to the title character's past, typically her childhood	
2014–2016	Penny Dreadful	Fantasy drama	Showtime	Features a flashback episode, "Closer Than Sisters"	
2014–present	Rick and Morty	Science fiction adult animated sitcom	Adult Swim	Features time travel, alternate and intertwining timelines	
2014–2019	The Affair	Drama	Showtime	Using unreliable narrators, the same events are revisited twice, according to the perception of each character	
2014–2019	Transparent	Comedy drama	Amazon Prime	Features flashbacks	
2014–present	True Detective	Drama	HBO	Especially season 1	
2014–2020	How to Get Away with Murder	Drama	ABC	In medias res narrative	
2014–2023	The Flash	Superhero	The CW	Time travel, parallel timelines and flashbacks	
2014	The Honourable Woman	Political-spy thriller	BBC Two	Features flashbacks	
2014	Manhattan Love Story	Romantic comedy	ABC		
2014–2016	The Missing	Drama	BBC One	Features flashbacks	
2014–2017	The Strain	Horror drama	FX	Mainly through the use of flashbacks	
2014–2017	The Leftovers	Drama	HBO	Through the use of dream immersions and flashbacks	
2014–2015	A to Z	Comedy	NBC		
2014–2015	Forever	Drama	ABC	Mainly through the use of flashbacks	

=== 2015 ===
Year	Title	Genre	Distributor	Notes	Ref
2015–2016	Aquarius	Period drama	NBC	Through the use of flashbacks and dream immersions	
2015–2016	Wayward Pines	Drama	Fox	Mainly through the use of flashbacks	
2015	Connected	Documentary	AOL On		
2015–2018	12 Monkeys	Science fiction	Syfy	Time travel	
2015–2017	American Crime	Drama	ABC	Features flashbacks and dream immersions	
2015–2017	Bloodline	Drama	Netflix	Flashforwards used as a narrative hook	
2015–2018	Daredevil	Superhero	Netflix	Mainly through the use of flashbacks	
2015–2023	Fear the Walking Dead	Post-apocalyptic drama	AMC	Uses multiple timelines, particularly in season 4 & 8	
2015–2019	Marvel's Jessica Jones	Superhero	Netflix	Through the use of flashbacks and dream immersions	
2015–2019	Sneaky Pete	Crime Drama	Amazon Originals	Through the use of flashbacks and multiple concurrent plot-lines	
2015–2018	Lovesick	Comedy drama	Netflix	Each episode explores a period in the protagonist's past	
2015–2017	Master of None	Comedy	Netflix	Through the use of flashbacks	
2015–2020	Fresh Off the Boat	Comedy	ABC	Only through the use of flashbacks	
2015–2018	Humans	Science fiction	Channel 4 and AMC	Only through the use of flashbacks	
2015–2019	Mr. Robot	Drama	USA Network	Through the use of dream immersions	
2015–2017	Narcos	Drama	Netflix	Only in flashbacks	
2015–2018	Sense8	Science fiction	Netflix	Only certain episodes, such as "I Can't Leave Her"	
2015	The Whispers	Science fiction	ABC	Features flashbacks	
2015–2018	Quantico	Drama	ABC	In medias res	
2015	You, Me and the Apocalypse	Comedy drama	Sky 1 and NBC	Features flashbacks	
2015–2024	Bunk'd	Comedy	Disney Channel	Setting takes place mostly in summer	

=== 2016 ===
Year	Title	Genre	Distributor	Notes	Ref
2016	11.22.63	Science fiction	Hulu	Time travel	
2016–present	Atlanta	Comedy drama	FX	Features a flashback episode, "FUBU"	
2016	The Night Manager	Espionage drama	BBC One, AMC	Features flashbacks	
2016–present	American Crime Story	Crime drama	FX	Features flashbacks	
2016–2019	Fleabag	Comedy drama	BBC One	Features flashbacks and dream immersions	
2016	Vinyl	Drama	HBO	Mainly through the use of flashbacks and dream immersions	
2016	Damien	Drama	A&E	Features flashbacks	
2016	The Family	Drama	ABC	Features flashbacks	
2016–2018	The Path	Drama	Hulu	Mainly through the use of flashbacks and dream immersions	
2016	Containment	Drama	The CW	Features flashbacks	
2016–2018	Lady Dynamite	Dark comedy	Netflix	This series features three narrative times, two different storylines in the past and one in the present	
2016–2017	Outcast	Drama	Cinemax	Mainly through the use of flashbacks	
2016–2019	Preacher	Drama	AMC	Mainly through the use of flashbacks	
2016–2025	Stranger Things	Drama	Netflix	Mainly through the use of flashbacks and separate plotlines	
2016–2022	This Is Us	Drama	NBC	Features extensive flashbacks and flashforwards	
2016–2020	The Good Place	Comedy	NBC and Netflix	Features flashbacks, particularly in season 1	
2016–2022	Westworld	Drama	HBO	This series features multiple narrative times, with various storylines in the past, an uncertain "present", and a future	

=== 2017 ===
Year	Title	Genre	Distributor	Notes	Ref
2017–2020	13 Reasons Why	Teen drama	Netflix	Features extensive use of flashbacks	
2017–2020	Dark	Science fiction drama	Netflix	Features time travel, flashbacks, parallel timelines, alternate and intertwining timelines	
2017–present	Made in Abyss	Science fiction fantasy	Sentai Filmworks and Netflix	Features extensive use of flashbacks	
2017–2021	Castlevania	Action drama	Netflix	Seasons 2 through 4 used two plotlines	
2017–2019	Anne with an E	Period drama	CBC Television and Netflix	Uses brief flashbacks	
2017	Twin Peaks: The Return	Drama	Showtime	Mainly through the use of flashbacks. Some occurrences in 'Part 2' happens before some events depicted in 'Part 1', and most events in 'Part 8' happens in the 1940s and 1950s. Time travel and alternative timeline also occurs.	

=== 2018 ===
Year	Title	Genre	Distributor	Notes	Ref
2018–present	9-1-1	Procedural drama	Fox	Features flashbacks	
2018–2020	Castle Rock	Psychological horror anthology	Hulu	Features two parallel storylines and flashbacks	
2018–present	Elite	Teen drama	Netflix	Features extensive use of flashbacks	
2018	Sharp Objects	Psychological thriller	HBO	Mainly through the use of flashbacks	
2018–2019	Sorry for Your Loss	Drama	Facebook Watch	Features two main storylines, one in the past and another in the present	
2018	The Haunting of Hill House	Drama	Netflix	Features extensive use of flashbacks	
2018–present	Homecoming	Drama	Amazon	Particularly in season 2	

=== 2019 ===
Year	Title	Genre	Distributor	Notes	Ref
2019–2026	Euphoria	Teen drama	HBO	Features flashbacks	
2019	Stateless	Drama mini-series	ABC	Features flashbacks	
2019–2024	The Umbrella Academy	Superhero drama	Netflix	Features flashbacks	
2019–2026	The Boys	Dark superhero comedy-drama	Amazon Prime Video	Features A-plot and B-plot structures, plotlines, and narratives throughout the series	
2019–present	The Witcher	Fantasy drama	Netflix	Features three main storylines	
2019–present	Undone	Comedy drama animation	Amazon Prime Video	Features time travel and flashbacks	
2019	Watchmen	Superhero drama	HBO	Features flashbacks	

== 2020s ==
=== 2020 ===
Year	Title	Genre	Distributor	Notes	Ref
2020	Inhuman Resources	Drama miniseries	Arte-Netflix		
2020	I Know This Much Is True	Drama miniseries	HBO	Features extensive flashbacks to two different timelines	
2020	I May Destroy You	Comedy drama	BBC One and HBO	Features extensive flashbacks	
2020–present	Jujutsu Kaisen	Fantasy anime	MBS	Features flashbacks	
2020	Little Fires Everywhere	Drama miniseries	Hulu	Features flashbacks and an entire flashback episode	
2020–2025	Mythic Quest	Comedy	Apple TV+	Features one anachronic episode per season	
2020–present	Soulmates	Science fiction anthology	AMC	Features two timelines	
2020	The Haunting of Bly Manor	Psychological horror	Netflix	Features a frame story, a story within a story and flashbacks	
2020	The Queen's Gambit	Drama miniseries	Netflix	Features flashbacks	
2020–2021	The Walking Dead: World Beyond	Post apocalyptic drama	AMC	Features flashbacks	
2020–2022	The Wilds	Survival teen drama	Amazon Prime Video	Features flashbacks	
2020–present	Tales from the Loop	Science fiction anthology drama	Amazon Prime Video	Features intertwining timelines and flashbacks	

=== 2021 ===
Year	Title	Genre	Distributor	Notes	Ref
2021	86: Eighty-Six	Science fiction anime	Tokyo MX	Features heavy use of flashbacks	
2021	Behind Her Eyes	Mystery thriller mini-series	Netflix	Features flashbacks and dream immersions	
2021–present	Lupin	Mystery comedy	Netflix	Features flashbacks	
2021–present	Invincible	Superhero adult animation	Amazon Prime Video	Features flashbacks	
2021–present	Invisible City	Psychological thriller	Netflix	Features flashbacks and dream immersions	
2021	Lisey's Story	Psychological horror miniseries	Apple TV+	Features intertwining timelines and dream immersions	
2021–present	Sweet Tooth	Fantasy drama	Netflix	Features flashbacks	
2021–present	Them	Horror	Amazon Prime Video	Features flashbacks	
2021–present	Trese	Fantasy horror anime-influenced animation	Netflix	Features flashbacks	
2021	The Serpent	True crime drama mini-series	BBC One and Netflix	Features three timelines	
2021	The Underground Railroad	Fantasy historical drama miniseries	Amazon Prime Video	Features flashbacks	
2021	Cruel Summer	True crime drama / mystery series	Hulu	Features three timelines	
2021–present	Yellowjackets	Psychological horror, Drama	Showtime	Follows two timelines: the survivors of a plane crash in the wilderness and their present-day lives	

=== 2022 ===
Year	Title	Genre	Distributor	Notes	Ref
2022	Inventing Anna	Drama miniseries	Netflix	Features extensive flashbacks	
2022–present	Outer Range	Science fiction neo-western	Amazon Prime Video	Features flashbacks and time travel	
2022	Pam & Tommy	Drama miniseries	Hulu	Features a flashback episode, "I Love You, Tommy"	
2022–present	The Afterparty	Comedy mystery	Apple TV+	Each episode retells the same event from a different character's perspective using varying narrative styles and timelines	
2022	The Tourist	Thriller	HBO Max	Features scattered narrative	
2022	Under the Banner of Heaven	Crime drama miniseries	Hulu	Uses flashbacks to the history of Mormonism alongside the present-day investigation	

=== 2023 ===
Year	Title	Genre	Distributor	Notes	Ref
2023–present	Poker Face	Mystery drama	Peacock	Each episode features a different case with flashbacks revealing clues	
2023	The Fall of the House of Usher	Horror miniseries	Netflix	The narrative shifts between past and present to unravel the story	
2023–present	The Last of Us	Post-apocalyptic drama	HBO	Features non-linear storytelling through flashbacks to character backstories	
2023–present	Silo	Science fiction drama	Apple TV+	Incorporates flashbacks to explore the history and mystery of the silo	
2023–present	Frieren: Beyond Journey's End	Fantasy anime	Nippon TV	Features heavy use of flashbacks	

=== 2024 ===
Year	Title	Genre	Distributor	Notes	Ref
2024–present	Fallout	Post-apocalyptic drama	Amazon Prime Video	Features flashbacks	
2024–present	Sunny	Comedy/drama	Apple TV+	Features flashbacks and a flashback episode	
2024	The Sympathizer	Historical comedy drama	HBO	Features flashbacks	

== See also ==
- Nonlinear narrative § Television
- List of nonlinear narrative films
