= List of narrative forms =

Narrative forms are the different ways, modes, or categories into which scholars of literary theory, film theory, drama, etc. classify stories. In particular, categorization has been popular by scholars since the 1950s, a period that has been described metaphorically as the Linnaean period in the study of narrative. One major binary division is simply into fiction versus nonfiction: stories that either incorporate imaginary elements or exclusively true, real-life elements. Narrative forms can also be classified by: artistic mediums/formats, story structures, or genres. The following provides merely some examples of how narrative forms can be broken down.

== Genres ==
A genre is a category of narrative based on traditional, socially agreed-upon elements, or conventions. Many, many genres exist, with the following list providing merely a handful of examples:

=== Fiction ===
- Historical fiction = a story that takes place in real historical settings, often featuring real historical figures and events, but which center on fictional characters, alongside those figures or settings
- Horror = a story that primarily aims to frighten or disturb its audience
- Realistic fiction = a story that portrays fictional characters, settings, or events that are completely plausible within the known laws of nature, the real world, or the social expectations of everyday real life
- Romance = a story between two or more people falling in love or the progress of their romantic relationship
- Speculative fiction = a story that strongly, obviously departs from current, real-world knowledge, scientific understandings, or real-life settings:
  - Fantasy = a story involving magical powers, magical events, or supernatural creatures
  - Science fiction = a story presenting advanced or futuristic changes in technology, scientific knowledge, or biological life
  - Superhero fiction = a story of heroes who battle villains using superhuman powers

=== Nonfiction ===
- Nature narrative = a story involving the personal observations and accompanying scientific connections of the storyteller in exploring landforms, such as famous mountains or lakes, or studying wildlife, such as animals or plants
- News story = a story about recent local, national, or international news of public interest
  - Journalism narrative = a story that takes creative license in being journalistic: a type of creative nonfiction
- True crime = a story recounting the commission of a real-life crime, usually also following the consequent investigation, plus the potential pursuit and arrest of the suspect

See the popular forms biography, autobiography, and memoir under "Books and short stories" below.

=== Either fiction or nonfiction ===
- Captivity narrative = a story in which the protagonist is captured and describes their experience with the culture of their captors.
- Thriller = a story that aims to keeps the audience's mood anxious and suspenseful in ways other than horror, often through high action and life-threatening situations
- Travel narrative = a story of the narrator's adventure or experiences in an unfamiliar new setting

== Literary forms ==
=== Books and short stories ===
- Biography = a detailed description or account of someone's real life, usually from their earliest days to their present age
  - Autobiography = a detailed description or account of the storyteller's own real life, usually from their earliest days to their present age
- Flash fiction = a fictional work of extreme brevity that still offers character and plot development
- Memoir = similar to an autobiography, except that memoirs generally deal with specific events in the life of the author, not the entire life history
- Novel = a long, written narrative, normally in prose, published in book format, which describes fictional characters and events, usually in the form of a sequential story
- Novella = a written, fictional, prose narrative normally longer than a short story but shorter than a novel
- Short story = a brief story that usually focuses on one character and one event

=== Poetry ===
- Narrative poem = a form of literature that uses aesthetic and often rhythmic qualities of language—such as metre, rhyme, and sound symbolism—to tell a narrative
  - Epic = a very long narrative, traditionally an epic poem, often written about a hero and their adventures (sometimes, in ancient times especially, spoken aloud to an audience)

== Oral or literary forms ==
- Fable = a didactic story, often using animal characters who behave like people
- Folk tale = an old story which has been passed down orally and which reveals the customs of a culture
- Legend = a story that is based on fact but often includes exaggerations about the hero
- Myth = an ancient story often meant to explain the mysteries of life or nature
- News = information on current events which is presented by print, broadcast, Internet, or word of mouth to a third party or mass audience
- Parable = a succinct, didactic story, in prose or verse, which illustrates one or more instructive lessons or principles
- Tall tale = a humorous story that tells about impossible happenings, exaggerating the hero's accomplishments

== Structures ==
The structure of a story, and in particular plot structure, is a major way of classifying stories:

- Chiastic = a story whose different earlier scenes or sections are mirrored or show close similarities to specific later scenes or sections
- Episodic = a story delivered in separate, independent installments across days or longer periods of time, which still form a single continuous narrative arc
- Epistolary = a story organized as a collection of personal letters
- Frame/nested = a story presented inside of one or more other stories
- Kishōtenketsu = a story in four parts, including a twist in the third part, that is traditional of East Asian storytelling
- Linear = a story delivered in expected, chronological order: from the beginning, to the middle, to the end
- Nonlinear = a story whose plot does not conform to conventional chronology, causality, and/or perspective (see: nonlinear films and television series)
  - Reverse-chronological = a story told in an order that is the exact opposite of chronological order: from the end, to the middle, to the beginning
- Three-act = a story told in three parts in terms of its conflict, consisting of the setup or inciting incident, the confrontation or climax, and the resolution, especially popular in Western filmmaking

== Theatrical or dramatic forms ==
These categories of narrative are grounded in drama: the performance of real humans, often on stage, in a theatre, or recorded on a set

- Concert dance = a story told through the physical body movements and gestures of performers on stage
- Movie and television = a story delivered through the visual (now often audio-visual) electronic medium of film, videotape, or digital film, watched on a screen
  - Screenplay = a story told through dialogue and action of actors that is meant to be performed for a motion picture (film) and exhibited on a screen
- Musical and opera = a story told, fully or in part, through songs performed by live actors on stage
- Play = a story that is told mostly through dialogue, meant to be performed by live actors on stage
- Roleplay = a story acted out through a game in which the players assume the identity of fictional characters in a potentially fictional setting

== Other forms ==
- Audio drama = a story spoken to an audience through an electronic medium; it may take the form of a radio show, podcast, webcast, etc.
  - Audiobook and ebook = a story read out loud, whose text comes from, or follows a similar format to, a print book
- Narrative art = a story told through static visual media, such as through sculpture, painting, or architectural adornments
- Video game = a story delivered through an interactive electronic game on a screen

== See also ==
- Bibliography
- Literary device
- Narrative mode
