= Panchali (disambiguation) =

Panchali refers to Draupadi, the wife of the Pandavas in the ancient Indian epic Mahabharata.

Panchali may also refer to:

- Panchali (narrative form), a form of narrative folk or religious songs or stories in the Bengal region
- Panchali language or Pogali, Indo-Aryan language spoken in Jammu and Kashmir, India
- Panchaali, a 1959 Indian film

== See also ==
- Panchala Kingdom
