= Literatronica =

The term literatronica, also literatronic (Marino, 2006), was coined by Colombian mathematician and author Juan B. Gutierrez (2002) to refer to electronic literature. According to Gutierrez (2006):

A word that describes digital narrative, that is, narrative designed for the computer, is literatronic. It comes from the Latin word litera -letter- and the Greek word which gave birth to the word electricity, electron -Amber. Literatronic means letter that requires electricity, or by extension, letter that requires a computer. Literatronic works could not be reproduced on paper except, perhaps, as a reading path at a given moment.

Gutierrez developed the literary hypertext authoring system known as Literatronica. Instead of relying solely on static hypertext links (for the system allows these as well), it uses an AI engine to recommend the best next pages based on what readers have already read. Literatronica radically revises the 1990s notions of literary hypertext as Modernist collage to the "original" notions of Arpanet as document sharing, where speed of access was put before what Espen Aarseth calls the aporia of links. In short, he asks, is nonlinearity and disruption inherent to the medium?

The system addresses several of the major classic problems found with hypertext, namely, the problems of:

1. Readers knowing how much of a text has been read.
2. Readers encountering repeated pages without artistic effect.
3. Readers getting lost and not finding their way through the text.
4. Writers struggling to maintain large systems of static links.

== How it works ==
1. Authors input their pages into the web interface.

2. Authors decide which pages should be linked with each other

3. Authors assign a numeric "distance" between connected pages. A passage which follows easily, or without much interpretive work might be a 5 while a passage that is distantly related might be a 25.

== What the system does ==
Out of these distances, the system creates a map. To help the reader traverse the map, the system runs a shortest path algorithm to suggest paths. Because the system is dynamic, it can change paths according to the pages the reader has already encountered.

== How the reader encounters it ==
The reader is presented with an opening page. At the bottom of the screen are titles and short teasers for n possible subsequent pages, being n a number decided by the author for each page. Percentages beside the titles of these pages indicate "narrative continuity", as the higher percentages indicate greater linkage. When there is only one subsequent page, the system merely offers a "next" button. Readers can choose any of the links; however, once a page has been read it is removed from the bullpen of choices. If readers want to go back, they can access the "map", and reset pages to "unread". This feature allows the system to show its true dynamic powers, as a system can rearrange sequence in a way that static links cannot.

== The author’s experience ==
The system can be used by each author in any number of ways. For example, an author can assign two pages the same distance, leaving it up to the reader to choose. Or the author can rate as highly continuous two pages that have nothing to do with each other, if they want their work to present a more difficult path. Writers might also offer their links in the hopes that readers will take the path less chosen.

This system introduces a new semiotic element: the relative distance between pages. Rather than thinking in hypertext terms, which elements should be linked, the author considers levels of kinship, affinity, connection. The system reports reader activity so that authors can get a sense of what paths people are taking. In response, authors can change the distances.

Gradually the readers will cut through the grass, wear it down to just dirt, and authors can lay the concrete on top in response — assuming the author has an interest in what the readers like to do.

== See also ==
- Electronic literature
- Reading path
