= Panchali (narrative form) =

Panchali is an oral narrative form of songs and stories in Assamese and Bengali culture. (panchali gaan collectively refers to the Bengali ballad songs) During a panchali recitation, the singer walks among the listeners making gestures to accompany the story. The tradition is found among both Hindu and Muslim communities. The themes are typically religious and reflect a variety of impacts on the culture through a period of several centuries. Some focus on the duties of a good wife.

Interspersed in the presentation of Bengali folk opera, there are frequently breaks which are filled with panchali and other forms of songs. The panchali is followed by the singing of a religious song in Assam.

Some popular Bengali "panchali"s include Lokkhir panchali (The Ballad of Goddess Lakshmi), Sriram panchali (The Ballad Lord Rāma), Bishohorir panchali (The Ballad of Goddess Manasā).
