= Reading path =

A reading path is a term used by Gunther Kress in Literacy in the New Media Age (2003). According to Kress, a professor of English Education at the University of London, a reading path is the way that the text, or text plus other features, can determine or order the way that we read it. In a linear, written text, the reader makes sense of the text according to the arrangement of the words, both grammatically and syntactically. In such a reading path, there is a sequential time to the text. In contrast, with non-linear text, such as the text found when reading a computer screen, where text is often combined with visual elements, the reading path is non-linear and non-sequential. Kress suggests that reading paths that contain visual images are more open to interpretation and the reader's construction of meaning. This is part of the "semiotic work" that we do as a reader.

== Linear reading path ==
An example of a linear reading path might be a textbook, with pictures, or paragraphs where the reader is led to assume cause-and-effect sequences, for example. Speech is also a linear path because the path is more "set". according to Kress.

== Non-linear reading path ==
An example of a non-linear reading path might be a text that has images alongside it. Kress argues that this different mode yields a different affordance; the visual image allows for open interpretation. A concrete example on paper might be a diagram such as a flow chart or graphic organizers. In such multi-modal texts, the reading path is much less linear and more open to the reader's interpretation.

The idea that reading paths differ according to evolving, emerging, multi-modal texts, are part of the New literacy studies, visual rhetoric, and the concept of multiliteracies.
