= Susan Sarandon =

American actor (born 1946)

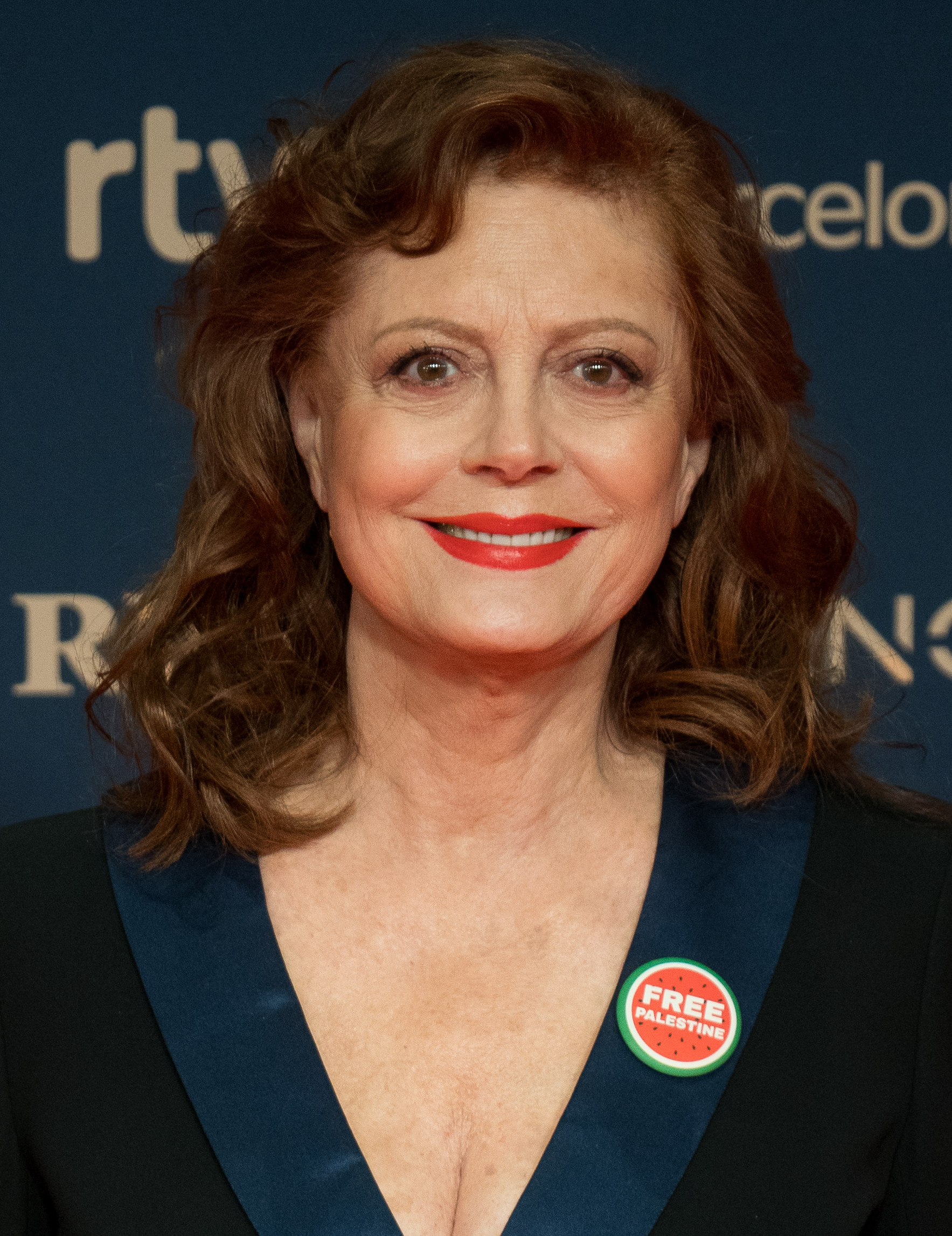
- Sarandon in 2026
- Born: Susan Abigail Tomalin; October 4, 1946 (age 80); New York City, U.S.
- Education: Catholic University of America (BA)
- Occupation: Actor
- Years active: 1970–present
- Works: Full list
- Spouse: Chris Sarandon (m. 1967; div. 1979)
- Partners: Louis Malle (1977–1980); Franco Amurri (1984–1988); Tim Robbins (1988–2009); Jonathan Bricklin (2010–2015)
- Children: 3, including Eva and Miles
- Awards: Full list

Susan Abigail Sarandon (/səˈrændən/ sə-RAN-dən; née Tomalin; born October 4, 1946) is an American actor. (Note: Sarandon has long rejected the usage of the term "actress", judging it belittling.) With a career spanning over five decades, she has received accolades, including an Academy Award, an Actor Award, and a British Academy Film Award, in addition to nominations for seven Emmy Awards, ten Golden Globes, and a Grammy Award.

Sarandon made her film debut in Joe (1970) and appeared on the soap operas A World Apart (1970–1971) and Search for Tomorrow (1972). She gained prominence for her role in the musical horror film The Rocky Horror Picture Show (1975). After receiving four Oscar nominations for Atlantic City (1980), Thelma & Louise (1991), Lorenzo's Oil (1992), and The Client (1994), Sarandon won the Academy Award for Best Actress for playing Helen Prejean in Dead Man Walking (1995). Her other notable films include Pretty Baby (1978), The Hunger (1983), The Witches of Eastwick (1987), Bull Durham (1988), Little Women (1994), Stepmom (1998), Enchanted (2007), The Lovely Bones (2009), Cloud Atlas (2012), Tammy (2014), and The Meddler (2015).

Sarandon made her Broadway debut in the play An Evening with Richard Nixon (1972) and returned to the stage in the 2009 revival of Exit the King. On television, she had guest roles on the sitcoms Friends (2001) and Malcolm in the Middle (2002), as well as starring roles as an advocate in the HBO film You Don't Know Jack (2010), Doris Duke in the HBO film Bernard and Doris (2008), and Bette Davis in the FX miniseries Feud (2017).

Also known for her social and political activism, Sarandon was appointed a UNICEF Goodwill Ambassador in 1999 and received the Action Against Hunger Humanitarian Award in 2006.

== Early life and education ==
Sarandon was born in Jackson Heights, Queens in New York City. She is the eldest of nine children of Lenora Marie (née Criscione; 1923–2020) and Phillip Leslie Tomalin, an advertising executive, television producer, and one-time nightclub singer. She has four brothers: Phillip Leslie Jr., Terry (an outdoorsman, journalist, and community leader), Timothy, and O'Brian (owner of Building 8 Brewery in Northampton, Massachusetts); and four sisters: Meredith (or "Merry"), Bonnie Priscilla, Amanda, and Melissa (or "Missy"). Her ancestors on her father's side were English from Hackney in London, Irish, and Welsh from Bridgend. On her mother's side she is of Italian descent, with ancestors from the regions of Tuscany (Coreglia Antelminelli) and Sicily. Her father worked for WOR-TV in New York City.

When she was four years old, the Tomalin family moved from New York City to the newly developed Stephenville community, located in the northern area of Raritan (now Edison) Township, New Jersey. The family was raised Roman Catholic and she and her sisters attended the all-girls Saint Francis Grammar School in nearby Metuchen, while her brothers attended the all-boys Saint Matthews Grammar School in Edison Township. Her mother was a member and board director of the Stephenville Women's Club and the Terra Nova Garden Club. The family was also member to the Woodside Swim Club, a private swimming club and park in the Stephenville community, where Sarandon and her sisters won many swimming competitions. Sarandon graduated from Saint Francis Grammar School in 1960.

Sarandon attended Edison High School, a public school located in Edison Township. In 1962, while still in high school, she joined a band and dance group to entertain sick children at a nearby rehabilitation hospital. As a high school junior, she performed the lead in the play Lady Precious Stream. As a senior, she played the title character in the comedy My Sister Eileen, earning mentions in the local newspapers. In 1964, Sarandon was inducted into the National Honor Society.

In May 1964, the Tomalin family moved to the newly developed Chandler Hill community, east of Stephenville in Edison. Sarandon graduated from Edison High School in 1964. She attended the Catholic University of America in Washington, D.C. from 1964 to 1968, earning a Bachelor of Arts in drama, and studying under the drama coach Gilbert V. Hartke. During and shortly after college, she supported herself by emptying bedpans in a hospital, cutting hair, cleaning houses and working as a switchboard operator.

== Career ==
In 1968, Sarandon and her then-husband Chris appeared on stage at the Wayside Theatre in Middletown, Virginia. The following year, the couple went to a casting call for the motion-picture Joe (1970). Although he did not get a part, she was cast in a major role of a disaffected teen who disappears into the seedy underworld. Between 1970 and 1972, she appeared in the soap operas A World Apart and Search for Tomorrow, playing Patrice Kahlman and Sarah Fairbanks, respectively. Her career gained momentum in 1974, when she starred in F. Scott Fitzgerald and 'The Last of the Belles', a highly rated made-for-television film, and Billy Wilder's screen adaptation of The Front Page. In 1975, Sarandon appeared in the cult favorite The Rocky Horror Picture Show and had the female lead in The Great Waldo Pepper, opposite Robert Redford. She was twice directed by Louis Malle, in Pretty Baby (1978) and Atlantic City (1980). The latter earned Sarandon her first Academy Award nomination.

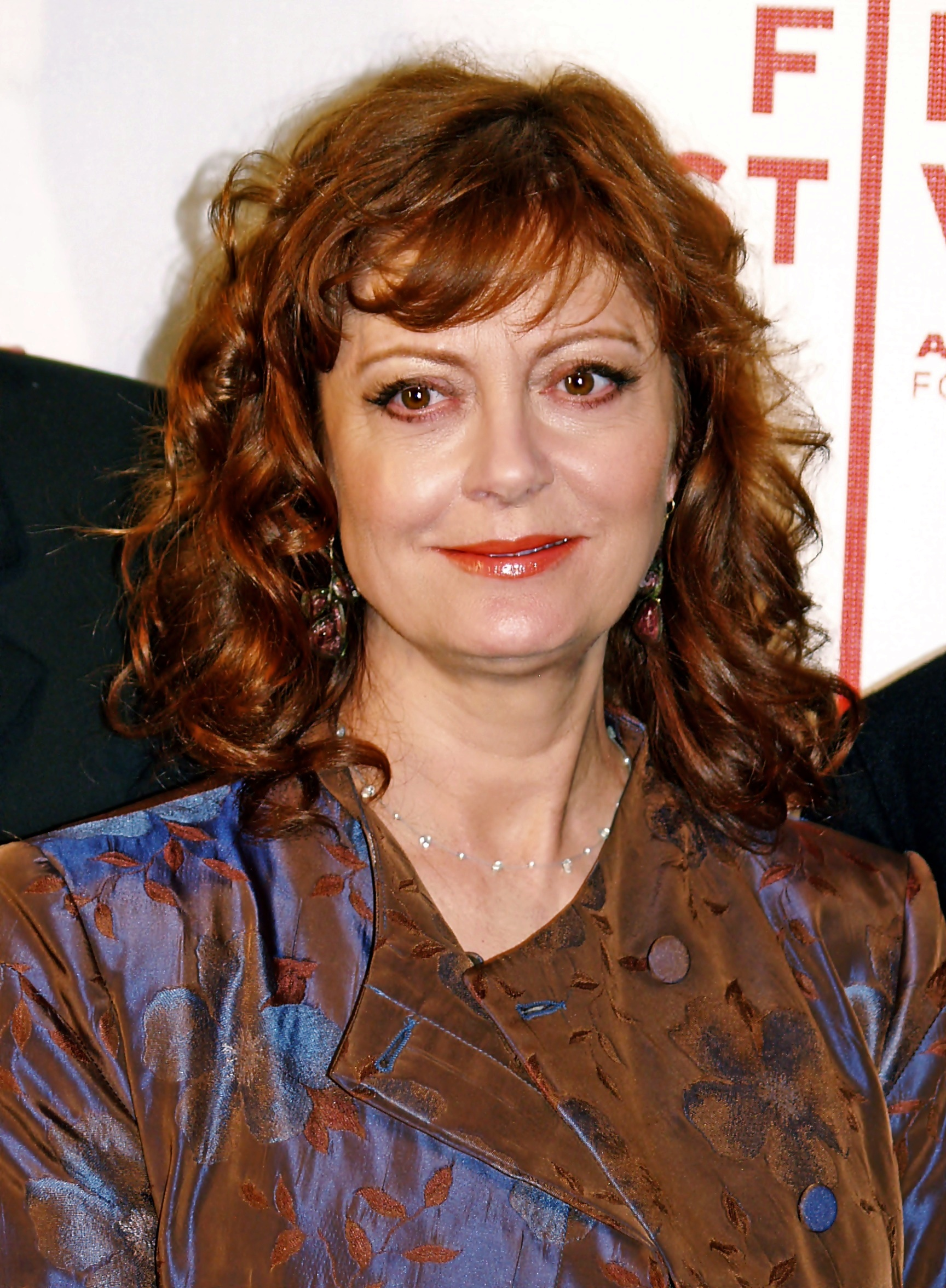
Sarandon at the 2008 Tribeca Film Festival

Her most controversial film appearance was in Tony Scott's The Hunger (1983), a modern vampire story in which she had a sex scene with Catherine Deneuve. It was the first mainstream American film to feature such a scene between two star actresses. She appeared in the comedy-fantasy The Witches of Eastwick (1987) alongside Jack Nicholson, Cher, and Michelle Pfeiffer. However, Sarandon did not become a "household name" until she appeared with Kevin Costner and Tim Robbins in the film Bull Durham (1988), a commercial and critical success. Roger Ebert praised Sarandon's performance in his review for the Chicago Sun-Times: "I don't know who else they could have hired to play Annie Savoy, the Sarandon character who pledges her heart and her body to one player a season, but I doubt if the character would have worked without Sarandon's wonderful performance".

Sarandon was nominated for an Academy Award four more times in the 1990s, as Best Actress as Louise Sawyer in Thelma & Louise (1991), Michaela Odone in Lorenzo's Oil (1992), and Reggie Love in The Client (1994), finally winning for Dead Man Walking (1995) in which she played Sister Helen Prejean who regularly visits a convicted murderer on death row. Janet Maslin, in The New York Times, wrote of her performance in the last film: "Ms. Sarandon takes the kind of risk she took playing a stubbornly obsessed mother in Lorenzo's Oil. She's commandingly blunt, and she avoids cheapening her performance with the wrong kind of compassion. Her Sister Helen is repelled and alarmed by this man, but she's determined to help him anyway. That's what makes the film so unrelenting." Sarandon was awarded the Women in Film Crystal Award in 1994. Additionally, she has received eight Golden Globe nominations, including for the films White Palace (1990), Stepmom (1998), Igby Goes Down (2002), and Bernard and Doris (2007).

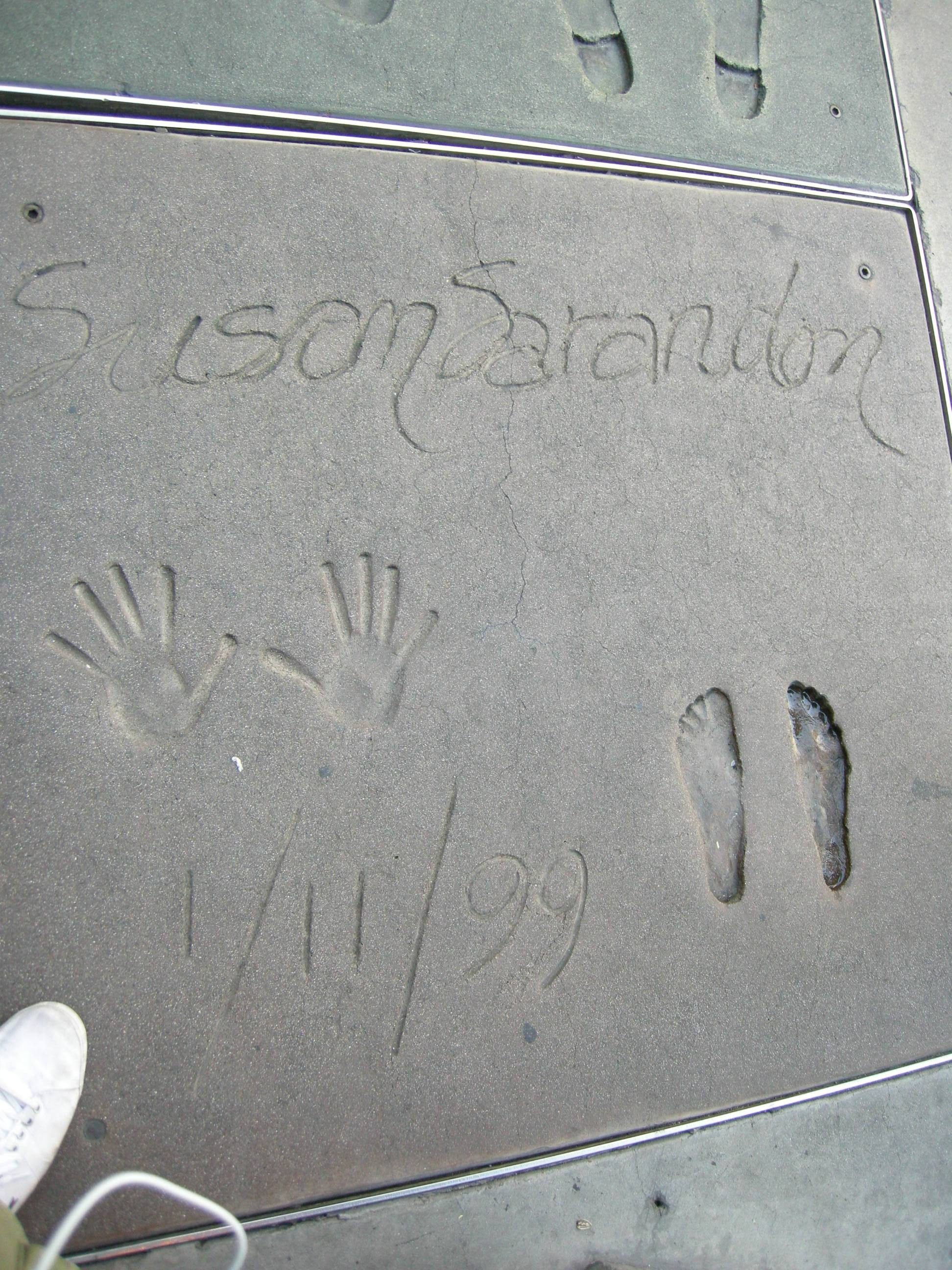
Sarandon's hand and footprints at Grauman's Chinese Theatre

Her other movies include Bob Roberts (1992), Little Women (1994), James and the Giant Peach (1996), Anywhere but Here (1999), Cradle Will Rock (1999), Rugrats in Paris: The Movie (2000), Cats & Dogs (2001), The Banger Sisters (2002), Shall We Dance (2004), Alfie (2004), Romance & Cigarettes (2005), Elizabethtown (2005), Enchanted (2007), and Speed Racer (2008). Sarandon has appeared in two episodes of The Simpsons, once as herself ("Bart Has Two Mommies") and as a ballet teacher, "Homer vs. Patty and Selma". She appeared on Friends, Malcolm in the Middle, Mad TV, Saturday Night Live, Chappelle's Show, 30 Rock, Rescue Me, and Mike & Molly.

Sarandon has contributed the narration to two dozen documentary films, many of which dealt with social and political issues. In addition, she has served as the presenter on many installments of the PBS documentary series, Independent Lens. In 1999 and 2000, she hosted and presented Mythos, a series of lectures by the late American mythology professor Joseph Campbell. Sarandon also participates as a member of the Jury for the NYICFF, a local New York City Film Festival dedicated to screening films made for children between the ages of 3 and 18.

Sarandon made her Broadway debut in 1972 in Gore Vidal's An Evening with Richard Nixon, in which she played several parts, among them Tricia Nixon and Martha Mitchell. Off-Broadway, she was nominated for the Drama Desk Award for A Coupla White Chicks Sitting Around Talking and for Extremities, in which she starred in 1983. She returned to Broadway in 2009 as Queen Marguerite in the revival of Eugène Ionesco's Exit the King, opposite Geoffrey Rush.

Sarandon appeared with an all-star cast in The Lovely Bones (2009), directed by Peter Jackson, and worked with daughter Eva Amurri in Middle of Nowhere (2008), That's My Boy (2012) and The Secret Life of Marilyn Monroe (2015). In 2012, Sarandon's audiobook performance of Carson McCullers' The Member of the Wedding was released at Audible.com. She appeared in the films Arbitrage (2012), Cloud Atlas (2012), Tammy (2014), and The Meddler (2015). In 2017, Sarandon portrayed Bette Davis in the first season of FX's anthology series Feud, where she earned her ninth Golden Globe nomination. She also appeared in A Bad Moms Christmas (2017)—the sequel to the 2016 film Bad Moms—as the mother of Carla Dunkler.

In 2018, she joined the "Social Impact Advisory Board" of the San Diego International Film Festival. In 2019, she connected with Justin Willman on Magic for Humans as a special guest on the Christmas episode. In Fall 2022, Sarandon starred in the FOX TV drama Monarch. In 2023, she starred in the DC Extended Universe superhero film Blue Beetle. In 2025, she starred alongside Vince Vaughn in Nonnas, an American comedy drama film directed by Stephen Chbosky. In 2025, she made her UK stage debut in Tracy Letts’s play Mary Page Marlowe.

== Political views and activism ==
Sarandon is known for her support of progressive and left-wing political causes, ranging from donations to organizations such as EMILY's List to participating in a 1983 delegation to Nicaragua sponsored by MADRE, an organization that promotes "social, environmental, and economic justice". In 1999, she was appointed UNICEF Goodwill Ambassador, supporting the organization's global advocacy and the work of the Canadian UNICEF Committee. In 2006, she was one of eight women selected to carry in the Olympic flag at the Opening Ceremony of the 2006 Olympic Winter Games, in Turin, Italy. The same year, Sarandon received the Action Against Hunger Humanitarian Award. Sarandon was appointed an FAO Goodwill Ambassador in 2010. She donated fruit trees to the New York City Housing Authority's Jamaica Houses in 2018 in the borough of Queens. Sarandon visited the housing complex in person to help plant the trees. In 2022, she joined as an ambassador to the HALO Trust, a landmine clearance organization. In May 2024, she urged Irish voters to re-elect Mick Wallace and Clare Daly as MEPs.

=== Anti-war activism ===
Sarandon and Robbins both took an early stance against the 2003 invasion of Iraq, with Sarandon stating that she was firmly against war as a pre-emptive strike. Prior to a 2003 protest sponsored by the United for Peace and Justice coalition, she said that many Americans "do not want to risk their children or the children of Iraq". Sarandon was one of the first to appear in a series of political ads sponsored by TrueMajority, an organization established by Ben & Jerry's Ice Cream founder Ben Cohen. Along with anti-war activist Cindy Sheehan, Sarandon took part in a 2006 Mother's Day protest, which was sponsored by Code Pink. In January 2007, she appeared with Robbins and Jane Fonda at an anti-war rally in Washington, D.C. in support of a Congressional measure to withdraw U.S. forces from Iraq.

=== Presidential politics ===
During the 2000 election, Sarandon supported Ralph Nader's run for president, serving as a co-chair of the National Steering Committee of Nader 2000. During the 2004 election campaign, she withheld support for Nader's bid, being among several "Nader Raiders" who urged Nader to drop out and his voters offer their support for Democratic Party candidate John Kerry. After the 2004 election, Sarandon called for US elections to be monitored by international entities.

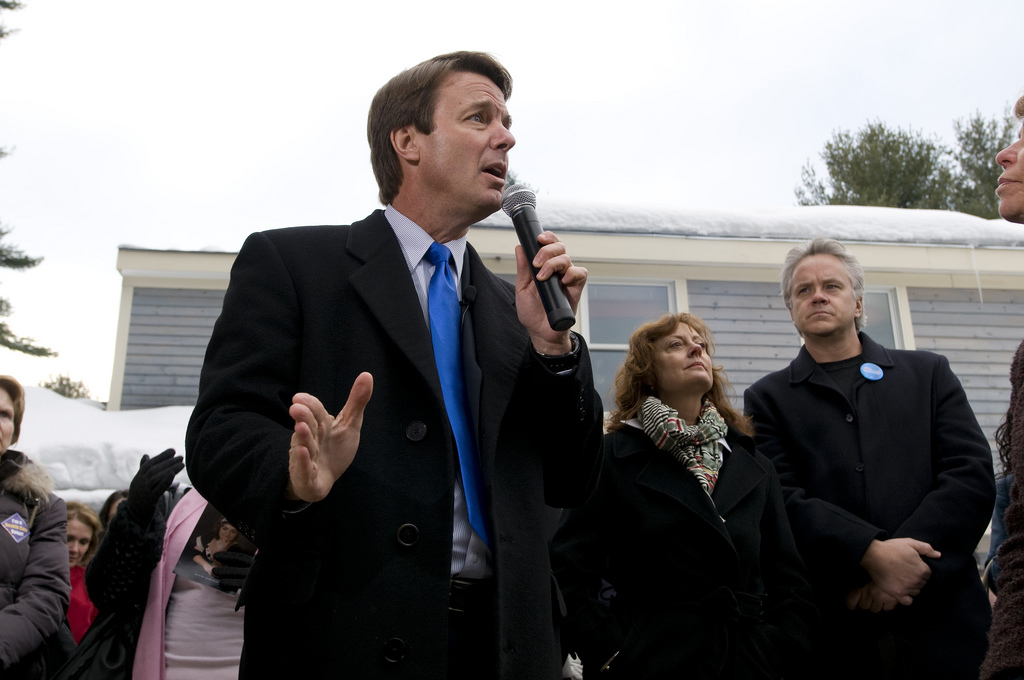
Sarandon and Tim Robbins appear alongside John Edwards at a presidential campaign rally in 2008

In the 2008 U.S. presidential election, Sarandon and Tim Robbins campaigned for John Edwards in the New Hampshire communities of Hampton, Bedford, and Dover. When asked at We Vote '08 Kickoff Party "What would Jesus do this primary season", Sarandon said, "I think Jesus would be very supportive of John Edwards." She later endorsed Barack Obama.

In the 2012 U.S. presidential election Sarandon, along with film director Michael Moore, said that they were not thrilled with Obama's performance but hoped he would be re-elected.

In the 2016 United States presidential election, she made public her support for Senator Bernie Sanders. On March 28, 2016, in an interview on All In with Chris Hayes, Sarandon indicated that she and other Sanders supporters might not support Hillary Clinton if Clinton were to be the Democratic nominee for president. She stated: "You know, some people feel that Donald Trump will bring the revolution immediately. If he gets in, then things will really explode." Hayes inquired as to whether it would be dangerous to allow Trump to become president, to which she replied: "If you think that it's pragmatic to shore up the status quo right now, then you're not in touch with the status quo". On October 30, 2016, she endorsed Green Party of the United States presidential candidate Jill Stein.

In an interview with The Guardian published on November 26, 2017, Sarandon said about Hillary Clinton: "I did think she was very, very dangerous. We would still be fracking, we would be at war" if she were president.

=== Civil rights ===
In 1995, Sarandon was one of many Hollywood actors, directors and writers interviewed for the documentary The Celluloid Closet, which explores how Hollywood films have depicted homosexuality.

Sarandon and Robbins appeared at the 2000 Shadow Convention in Los Angeles to speak about drug offenders being unduly punished. In 2004, she served on the advisory committee for 2004 Racism Watch, an activist group.

Sarandon has become an advocate to end the death penalty and mass incarceration. She has joined the team of people fighting to save the life of Richard Glossip, a man on death row in Oklahoma. In May 2015, Sarandon launched a campaign with fundraising platform Represent.com to sell T-shirts to help finance the documentary Deep Run, the story of a poor North Carolina teen undergoing a gender transition.

=== Since 2011 ===
On March 12, 2011, Sarandon spoke before a crowd in Madison, Wisconsin protesting Governor Scott Walker and his Budget Repair Bill. On September 27, 2011, Sarandon spoke to reporters and interested parties at the Occupy Wall Street protest in New York City. Her use of the word Nazi to describe Pope Benedict XVI on October 15, 2011 generated complaints from Roman Catholic authorities and from the Anti-Defamation League, which called on Sarandon to apologize. Sarandon brought activist Rosa Clemente to the 75th Golden Globe Awards and participated in a rally against gun violence in June 2018.

On June 28, 2018, Sarandon was arrested during the Women Disobey protests, along with 575 other people, for protesting at the Hart Senate Office Building where a sit-in was being held against Donald Trump's migrant separation policy. In May 2019, Sarandon attracted criticism from Syrians and activists for sharing an unverified document by an OPCW employee that cast doubt on the Assad regime's responsibility for the Douma Chemical Attack. The Center for Strategic and International Studies described Sarandon as promoting disinformation regarding the attack.

On May 27, 2021, Sarandon tweeted in support of the Palestinian people, in her words, "fighting against the apartheid government of Netanyahu", and of the Israeli people "that they too, will enjoy peace". She expressed support for Palestinian-American model Bella Hadid "for having the bravery to stand in solidarity with her people". She also co-signed an open letter criticizing Israel for labeling six Palestinian human rights groups as terror organizations, and quoted Desmond Tutu on the conflict saying that "true peace can ultimately be built only on justice". Sarandon was the executive producer for Soufra, a documentary that covered the development of a food truck in the Bourj el Barajneh Palestinian refugee camp in Beirut, Lebanon.

In February 2022, some law enforcement organizations criticized Sarandon for sharing a tweet that described a photo of police officers honoring a killed officer as fascism. She later deleted the tweet and posted a message on Twitter to apologize.

==== Gaza war ====
In November 2023, Sarandon spoke out against the Israeli government's actions during the Gaza war. At a pro-Palestinian rally in Union Square on November 17, Sarandon said: "There are a lot of people afraid of being Jewish at this time, and are getting a taste of what it feels like to be a Muslim in this country, so often subjected to violence." Four days later, she was dropped as a client by United Talent Agency. On December 1, Sarandon issued an apology for the phrasing of her comment, saying that "it implies that until recently Jews have been strangers to persecution, when the opposite is true". On March 12, 2025, Sarandon attended the detention hearing of Palestinian activist and US permanent resident Mahmoud Khalil, who was detained by ICE, and stated her support for the free speech rights of Khalil and all US residents.

Following the Israeli thwarting of several attempts to break its blockade of the Gaza Strip, Sarandon joined the steering committee for the Global Sumud Flotilla, which was the largest civilian-led aid flotilla to Gaza. It started sailing in August 2025 and was intercepted by Israel on October 2.

Sarandon was one of the executive producers of the 2026 Gaza documentary Life Support featuring the testimonies of mostly Western doctors who served as volunteers in Gaza hospitals. On September 24, 2026, Sarandon was detained by police in New York City while protesting Israeli prime minister Benjamin Netanyahu’s speech at the United Nations.

In October 2026, she signed an open letter backing author Sally Rooney, whose books were withdrawn from sale in the United Kingdom due to her support for Palestine Action, and calling the withdrawal an "affront to basic principles of free speech and expression".

== Personal life ==
Sarandon at the 2026 Tribeca Festival for The Accompanist

While in college, she met fellow student Chris Sarandon; they married on September 16, 1967. They announced a trial separation in 1975 and divorced in 1979, but she retained his surname. From 1977 until 1980, Sarandon had a live-in relationship with director Louis Malle, after which she was sporadically involved with musician David Bowie and, briefly, actor Sean Penn.

In the mid-1980s, Sarandon dated Italian filmmaker Franco Amurri, with whom she had a daughter, Eva Amurri. They met on the set of Tempest in 1981, but did not get together until she returned to Italy to shoot Mussolini and I three years later. In 2017, Sarandon revealed that she had had an affair with British actor Philip Sayer, who she further revealed had been gay.

Beginning in 1988, Sarandon lived with actor Tim Robbins, whom she met while they were filming Bull Durham. They have two sons, including Miles. Sarandon, like Robbins, is a lapsed Catholic, and they share liberal political views. They broke up in 2009.

Following her breakup with Robbins, Sarandon began a relationship with Jonathan Bricklin, son of Malcolm Bricklin. They helped establish a chain of table tennis lounges named SPiN. Sarandon is the co-owner of its New York and Toronto locations. Sarandon and Bricklin broke up in 2015.

In 2006, Sarandon and ten relatives, including her son Miles, traveled to the United Kingdom to trace her family's Welsh genealogy. Their journey was documented by the BBC Wales programme, Coming Home: Susan Sarandon. Much of the same research and content was featured in the American version of Who Do You Think You Are? She also received the Ragusani Nel Mondo prize in 2006; her Sicilian roots are in Ragusa, Italy.

Sarandon is bisexual, seemingly coming out during a September 2022 appearance on The Tonight Show Starring Jimmy Fallon. She also previously told Pride Source in 2017 that her sexuality was "open" and "up for grabs", and on a 2021 episode of the Divorced Not Dead podcast said of her dating interests, "I don't care if it's a man or a woman. I mean, I'm open to all age, all color. And those for me, those things are just details."

== Awards and nominations ==
Sarandon received the Lifetime Achievement Award at the 2009 Stockholm International Film Festival, was inducted into the New Jersey Hall of Fame in 2010, and received the Outstanding Artistic Life Award for her Outstanding Contribution to World Cinema at the 2011 Shanghai International Film Festival. In 2013, she was invited to inaugurate the 44th International Film Festival of India (IFFI) in Goa. In 2015, Sarandon received the Goldene Kamera international lifetime achievement award.

Sarandon has been recognized by the Academy of Motion Picture Arts and Sciences (AMPAS) for the following films:

- 54th Academy Awards, Best Actress in a Leading Role, nomination, Atlantic City (1981)
- 64th Academy Awards, Best Actress in a Leading Role, nomination, Thelma & Louise (1991)
- 65th Academy Awards, Best Actress in a Leading Role, nomination, Lorenzo's Oil (1992)
- 67th Academy Awards, Best Actress in a Leading Role, nomination, The Client (1994)
- 68th Academy Awards, Best Actress in a Leading Role, win, Dead Man Walking (1995)

== See also ==
- List of American film actresses
- List of American television actresses
- List of actors with Academy Award nominations
- List of actors with more than one Academy Award nomination in the acting categories
