= Genre convention =

Type of narrative convention

In literature, fiction, and narrative broadly, a convention or trope (among other meanings) may refer to any type of situation, character, plot structure, physical object, or other element that commonly appears or recurs across works within a particular genre or narrative medium. Thus, for instance, tropes typical in narratives of science fiction are often distinct from those of fantasy, which are often distinct from those of horror, etc. Conventions are the very features that are expected of, and that may even define, a given genre, as determined by social custom. The word motif, while possibly a synonym, usually instead refers to such an element that recurs internally within a single story (or series) only.

== Literary theory ==
Usually a subset of narrative techniques, genre conventions serve as efficient templates for communicating information, emotionally engaging the audience, or establishing a context that audiences are already familiar with or are presumed to be familiar with. In the latter case, the creator of the narrative can thus avoid long-winded explanations or heavy-handed exposition. In some cases, however, the use of tropes (especially their overuse) is regarded by audience members or reviewers as cheap narrative shortcuts or clichés. Art within a genre is often reviewed positively if it skirts the edges of the genre's typical conventions, rather than either rigidly adhering to the conventions or fully rejecting them; walking this line allows the creator to maintain suspense and to play with and challenge audience expectations. Literary theory acknowledges that, since there is such a long and complicated history of genres, subverting a certain genre's tropes frequently entails reinforcing others.

Despite genres having the connotation of fixed or firm boundaries, they gradually shift over time, splinter into new sub-genres, give way to newly forming genres, rise and diminish in popularity, etc. Modern-day theorists do not strictly define genres but rather may describe the "family resemblances" of their tropes (per the philosopher Ludwig Wittgenstein), shared among the various works that belong under them, in such a way that any "individual text within a genre rarely if ever has all of the characteristic features of the genre", according to semiotician Daniel Chandler. Others criticize this framework for opening the door to excess ambiguity, instead preferring to view genres and their tropes through the lens of prototype theory, in which some works are more representative of the genre than others, based on their higher number of qualifying tropes. Regardless of the particular analytic framing, genres and their conventions are always a matter of ever-shifting social and historical expectations.

=== In non-narrative media ===
Tropes technically also exist for non-narrative genres and artistic media as well, such as for recipes, manuals, and weather reports. These texts have a well-established tradition of being formatted and stylized in a particular customary way. Auditory media like music videos and songs have their own conventions as well.

== Examples within narrative fiction genres ==
- Buried treasure: a hidden set of valuable objects whose potential for discovery is the inciting incident (a motivating plot device) for an adventure—in adventure fiction
- Closed circle of suspects: the scenario of a crime scene, often a murder, with a limited number of clear suspects unable to flee the scene, for instance, because they are on an island, a moving train, or some other isolating location—in mystery and crime fiction
- Deal with the Devil: the scenario of a protagonist making a bargain with the Devil or other demon, receiving an immediate desired magical outcome in exchange for his soul being taken by the demon upon his death—in fantasy, folklore, mythology, etc.
- Evidence board: a notice board or wall covered with a collage of physical media, such as papers, photographs, pins, and (often red) strings, to represent a character's jumbled attempts at connection-making or problem-solving—in thriller, mystery, and crime fiction
- Interstellar ships, empires, wars, travel, etc.: activities and vehicles that range between multiple planets or star systems—in science fiction
- Jump scare: a moment that delivers the audience an abrupt jolt of fear via surprise—in horror
- Kaiju: a gigantic beast that ravishes a city, often carrying sociopolitical symbolism (such as Godzilla or King Kong)—especially in Japanese monster films; it often now refers to that sub-genre of horror
- Meet-cute: a moment when soon-to-be-lovers whimsically encounter each other for the very first time—in romance
- Princess and dragon: the scenario of a beautiful marriageable noblewoman being rescued by a daring hero from the clutches of a vicious serpentine monster—in high fantasy, folklore, mythology, etc.
- Queen's Latin: the use of British upper-class accents for characters from non-British parts of the world or from fictional places—in historical drama, historical fantasy, and high fantasy performed in the English language, such as in Cleopatra (1963), the Lord of the Rings films (2001-2003), or the Game of Thrones television series (2011-2019)
- Red herring: a clue that deliberately misleads the characters or audience—in mystery and crime fiction
- Stock characters, or character archetypes, are a subset of genre tropes in the form of characters, of which a long list exists. Some popular examples of these types of characters are provided below:
  - The Chosen One: a supernaturally or divinely selected hero character, who is the savior of humankind from impending doom—in fantasy (or science fantasy)
  - Little green men and grey aliens: extraterrestrial beings depicted as humanoids with oversized bald heads, large eyes, and smooth hairless bodies—in science fiction
  - Manic pixie dream girl: an alluringly chaotic or eccentric young woman who serves as the love interest for a bored or shy everyman protagonist (a type of foil character)—in romance
  - Supervillain: an evil antagonist with superhuman powers or advanced technological abilities, in superhero fiction
- Spawning: the spontaneous and unexplained generation (or, after death, regeneration) of a playable character in a particular time and place—in video games
- Time-travel tropes, such as time paradoxes and time portals—in science fiction

== Particular types ==
- Dramatic tropes
- Fantasy tropes
- Film tropes
- Romance tropes
- Science fiction tropes
