= Juan B. Gutiérrez =

American mathematician and author

Juan Bernardo Gutiérrez
- Born: March 17, 1973 (age 53); Bogotá, D.C., Colombia
- Occupations: Novelist, professor of mathematics
- Writing career
- Period: 1996-present
- Notable work: Extreme Conditions
- Website: literatronica.com

Juan Bernardo Gutiérrez (born March 17, 1973) is an American mathematician and author of Colombian origin, known primarily for his theoretical and practical contributions in the field of electronic literature.

== Biography ==
Gutiérrez was born in Bogotá, Colombia. He graduated in 1996 with a B.Sc. in civil engineering from the National University of Colombia. He moved to the United States in 2001. He graduated in 2009 with a Ph.D. in mathematical biology from Florida State University. Currently he is a professor of mathematics at the University of Texas at San Antonio.

In 1996, at age 23, he won the international literary prize Carlos Castro Saavedra in Medellín, Colombia. That same year, he was awarded a National Grant in Literature by the Colombian Ministry of Culture to write the digital novel El Primer Vuelo de los Hermanos Wright (The First Flight of the Wright Brothers). In 1997 and 1998 he received two national grants from the Bogotan Institute of Culture to write the digital novel Condiciones Extremas (Extreme Conditions). These two novels are regarded as the first hypertextual novels in the Spanish language.

Gutiérrez developed the literary hypertext authoring system known as Literatronica, which uses an AI engine to adapt the narrative pieces to readers based upon their interaction with the system.

== Bibliography in English ==
- Extreme Conditions, Version 3, 2005. Digital novel published in Literatronica.com
- The First Flight of the Wright Brothers, Version 2, 2006. Digital novel published in Literatronica.com

He has also published in Spanish several short stories, a story book, the same two novels referenced, and scholarly articles.
