= Literacy in the New Media Age =

2003 book by Gunther Kress

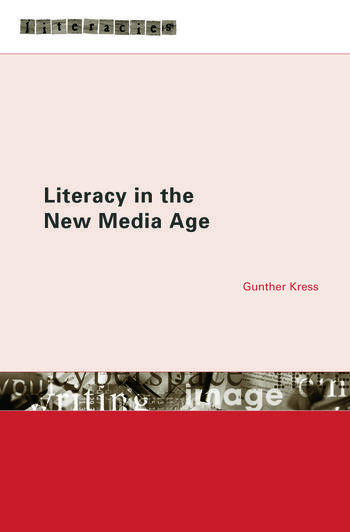
- Author: Gunther Kress
- Language: English
- Publisher: Taylor & Francis Group
- Publication date: 2003

Written in 2003, and published by Taylor & Francis Group, Gunther Kress' book Literacy in the New Media Age explores how the introduction of modern technology has impacted the way individuals interact with their culture through written and oral communication. Expanding upon the idea of the evolution of media and writing in a digital medium, Kress looks at the impacts of media communications on societies and cultures and vice versa.

== Contents ==
=== The History and future of literacy ===
Kress' work seeks to expand the idea of writing as something that works in conjunction with culture throughout history. From the simplicity of the common for of literacy in which audiences can read and understand the written word in their common language, Kress understands literacy to be a "mode of representation" for ideas and changes happening around the readers and writers of the written word. To Kress, being "literate" means to also have a deeper and more abstract understanding of other dimensions of culture and social awareness.

"The new media of information and communication have faculties which differ from those of the older media of book and page. Above all these consist in the potentials for action by writers and readers, make of texts and remakes of texts..."(Literacy in the New Media Age, p.49)

Claiming that reading is a form of semiosis between the reader, writer and the outside influences as large, Kress acknowledges the strong hold imagery and visual media has on the majority of communicable communications. Stating that "some things are common to 'reading; across time, across cultures, across space..."(Literacy in the New Media Age, p. 139) Kress points out that reading practices are changing not just the physical format and grammatical forms of writing but also in the interpretation of non alphabetic writing.

=== Writing in context ===
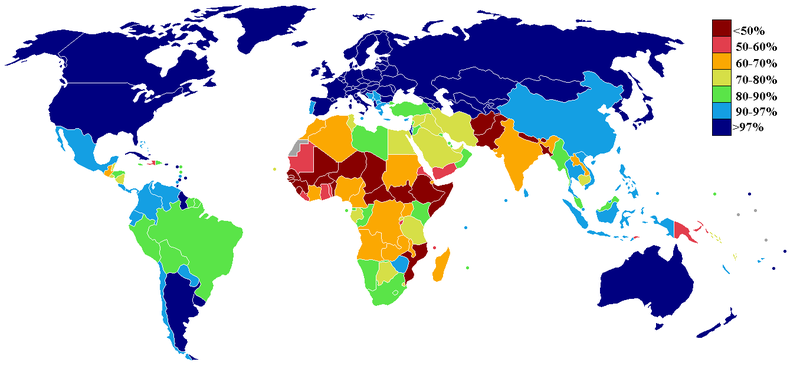
World Literacy Rates Map

Seeing writing and reading as a "meaning making process" that individuals and groups use to share knowledge and ideas in a physical form, Kress connected the prevalence of wring and literacy in cultures as connected to other social and cultural changes such as economic, social and the prevalence of technology and invention.

With the changes over times, Kress questions the ides of literacy in a time when visual aids can replace as well as coincide with the written word. Referencing the multiple applications of literacy when it comes to politics, media, visual imagery, science etc. Kress addresses the limitations to the idea of literacy and seeks to expand the idea of communications through writing. the "design" of writing, Kress muses, is the ability to generate changes in meaning and purpose in writing to fit the times, stating that:

"Design asks 'what is needed now, in this one situation, with this configuration of purposes, aims, audience, and with these resources and given my interests in this situation?'... In a multimodal environment the realizations of this are aided bu te varying affordances of the model dn the facilities of the new media of information and communication." (Literacy in the New Media Age, p.49)

=== The shifting of the medium ===
Kress addresses the shift from physical books to digital typefaces as a means to discuss the practical uses of both the written and types word. Acknowledging that the medium of a message holds over power by those who engage with the material, Kress brings to light the multifaceted capabilities of digital technology when it comes to writing through tools such as e-learning, interactive literature aids, and engagement tools.

Citing literacy as a tool for individuals, the use of digital literate can engage the human imagination in ways that traditional paper novels cannot. The connection between the literate reader and the source of written information involved not only words on a page or screen but the interpretation and relationship the reader has with the words through experiences. Addressing this, Kress states that:

"Of course the possibilities of connections across elements, neither given nor constrained by a reading path, are myriad too, and they too provide the space for imagination. But this form of reading is already moving in the direction of the new forms of reading, as I will say several times in the book, where the reader imposes her or his ordering on a weakly structured ordered structure, or an entity with no clearly imposed order." (Literacy in the New Media Age, p.59)

Through digital writing, the format of technology allows readers as well as content writers to work on the integral engagement of the work with wide audiences. The continuous stream of visual media and text show that the visual aspect and design of technology in regards to media allows for a unique relationship between the visual and grammatical structure of writing for the viewer. With the growth of the visual media and the occurrence of images used to communicate digitally, communication across technology has shows the evolution of society as well as the audience. States Kress:

"Language as speech will remain the major mode of communication language as write will increasingly de displaced by image in many domains of public communication through writing will remain the preferred mode of the political and cultural elites. the combined effects of writing of the dominance o the mode of image and of the medium of the screen will produce deep changes in the forms and functions of writing." (The Futures of Literacy, p.1)
