= AOL On =

Internet video service

- Website type: Entertainment, Video & News
- Predecessor: AOL TV
- Successor: AOL Video
- Industry: Mass Media
- Parent: AOL
- Website: on.aol.com
- Launched: April 24, 2012
- Current status: Active

AOL On was created as a successor to AOL TV. The launch was announced at the 2012 Digital Content NewFront. AOL On creates news and entertainment reports in the form of short video clips, as well as original web series. All videos are available on demand online or on the Apple TV, TiVo and Android TV.

== History ==
AOL On was created in April 2012. Content includes current events, breaking news, entertainment, new tech and more. Video clips can be viewed on demand at on.aol.com.

On December 12, 2012, AOL announced they released an app for the TV Premier

On June 24, 2014, CNET announced that AOL had added AOL On to the Apple TV.

AOL On was added to the Android TV in October 6 of 2014

In late 2015, it was reported by The Wall Street Journal that AOL On's media partners were unhappy with the service's distribution model.

On October 4, 2018, MakeUseOf revealed that AOL On had a secret Roku channel, providing access to the streaming service of Roku-branded smart TV devices.

== AOL Originals ==
Through AOL On, AOL offers multiple original series. The majority of the shows are documentaries. They also release news segments and videos.

- City Ballet: Documentary on the lives of New York City Ballet dancers.
- #candidlynicole: A "dirty" sitcom.
- Anthony Eats America: Anthony visits different restaurants and foods from all across America.
- Inspiration Point: A show on create neat arts and crafts.
- Second Chances: A show highlighting women who have gone through dire troubles overcame them.
- Hardwired: The latest tech news & gadgets.
- Flat Out: A high-end documentary about the daily life and struggles of Dylan Kwasniewski as he aspires to be a top NASCAR racer.
- Connected
- True Trans With Laura Jane Grace: A documentary on the lives of Isley Reust and various other people across America who identify as transgender.
- The Future Starts Here: A human interest series focusing on the influences technology holds over human behavior.
