= An Evening with Richard Nixon =

Play by Gore Vidal

An Evening with Richard Nixon, originally billed as An Evening with Richard Nixon and..., is a play by Gore Vidal which opened at the Shubert Theatre in April 1972. The play was produced by Hillard Elkins, directed by Edwin Sherin, and starred George S. Irving, Gene Rupert, Humbert Allen Estredo, Stephen D. Newman, Philip Sterling and Robert King. As yet "undiscovered" in the ensemble were future stars Maureen Anderman and Susan Sarandon.

The play is a wry examination of the career and Presidency (up to that pre-Watergate point) of Richard M. Nixon (Irving). As it starts, two pundits, a William F. Buckley-like Pro (Rupert) and a Gore Vidal-like Con (Estredo) are debating the worthiness of Nixon. Unable to settle their differences objectively, they magically convene a tribunal of deceased, past Presidents — Dwight D. Eisenhower (Sterling), John F. Kennedy (King) and George Washington (Newman) — to review Nixon's career and pass judgment. The rules are strict: anything we observe in the central playing area, which is dedicated to historical recreation, is taken from actual public record; every word spoken by anyone is what that person actually said. This applies especially to Nixon, whose words, we are assured, remain in their original context. Only Pro, Con and the Tribunal speak freely in the immediate present. And of course, they have much to say.

Previews began on April 18, and the play ran from April 30 to May 13, for a total of 14 previews and 16 regular performances.

The published version of the play, prepared prior to rehearsals, features only the tribunal of presidents, but not the characters of Pro and Con, who were added later.
