= Magic for Humans =

American magic show on Netflix

- Genre: Reality
- Created by: Justin Willman
- Directed by: Adam Franklin
- Presented by: Justin Willman
- Country of origin: United States
- Original language: English
- No. of seasons: 3
- No. of episodes: 19

Production
- Executive producers: Tim Heidecker; Dave Kneebone; Eric Wareheim; Justin Willman
- Cinematography: Eric Bader
- Editors: Trevor Ames; Asher Bingham
- Running time: 21–25 minutes
- Production company: Abso Lutely Productions

Original release
- Network: Netflix
- Release: August 17, 2018 – May 15, 2020

Magic for Humans is an American reality television show. Its first season of six episodes was released on Netflix on August 17, 2018. The show features comedian and magician Justin Willman performing magic tricks for people on the street. He has said that the tricks actually happen as shown and are not edited.

Magic for Humans returned for a second season on December 4, 2019. On January 16, 2020, while appearing on The Tonight Show Starring Jimmy Fallon, Willman announced that Magic For Humans had been picked up for a third season. The third season was released on May 15, 2020.

== Episodes ==
Season	Episodes	Originally released
1	6	August 17, 2018
2	6	December 4, 2019
3	7	May 15, 2020

=== Season 1 (2018) ===
No. overall	No. in season	Title	Original release date
1	1	"Self Control"	August 17, 2018
Justin explores the concepts of marshmallow self-control and why it's best just to go with the flow. Plus -- free fro-yo!
2	2	"Express Yourself"	August 17, 2018
School uniforms. Latte art. LEGO sculptures. Justin tackles the surprisingly magical ways people choose to express themselves.
3	3	"Terrifying Tech"	August 17, 2018
It's man vs. machine as Justin squares off against a robot in a magic battle. Other topics include delivery drones, face yoga and virtual reality.
4	4	"Seeing Is Believing"	August 17, 2018
Justin attempts to convince people that invisibility, brain-enhancing medicines and superpowers are all real. (Spoiler alert: They're not!)
5	5	"Guilt Trip"	August 17, 2018
Oh, the guilt! Justin talks to moms about lying for a living. Later, he conducts an eyewitness experiment and amazes detention-stricken students.
6	6	"Love"	August 17, 2018
In this episode dedicated to romance, Justin helps a single guy get a date and delivers a surprise proposal to a woman who married herself.

=== Season 2 (2019) ===
No. overall	No. in season	Title	Original release date
7	1	"Christmas"	December 4, 2019
Ho ho ho! Justin embraces the holiday spirit and visits Santa school, gets playful with Susan Sarandon and teaches kids about the magic of giving.
8	2	"Fake"	December 4, 2019
It's all about suspending disbelief when Justin links TV magic to pro wrestling, fools a lie detector and role-plays a fantasy mage in the park.
9	3	"Daddy Issues"	December 4, 2019
Between bad dad jokes, Justin pulls pranks with his son, awes parents with his uncanny childproofing and tests his reflexes against the LA Chargers.
10	4	"We Should Talk"	December 4, 2019
Communication is key as Justin plays language games in an ESL class and conducts psychic readings at a library. Plus: starstruck subliminal messages.
11	5	"All Work and No Play"	December 4, 2019
After telecommuting via a handy TaskRabbit helper, Justin amazes kids with tricks for skipping chores and performs a feat of dazzling multitasking.
12	6	"Time is Relative"	December 4, 2019
Justin turns water into mead at the Renaissance fair and speed-knits a sweater before slowing down to share magical memories with his mother.

=== Season 3 (2020) ===
No. overall	No. in season	Title	Original release date
13	1	"Power Trip"	May 15, 2020
Magic can influence the influencers and convince people they feel things they don't. But it can also teach children about the power of positive words.
14	2	"Vices"	May 15, 2020
Embracing naughty habits, Justin magically figures out who’s high, hustles kids with broccoli and visits a rage room.
15	3	"Home"	May 15, 2020
After conjuring the ideal house pet in a cat cafe, Justin tackles his greatest challenge yet by assembling Ikea furniture — only to end up in pieces.
16	4	"Self Care"	May 15, 2020
Seeking a little “me” time, Justin indulges in a mystical massage, struts his superhuman strength at the gym and convinces socks to fold themselves.
17	5	"The End"	May 15, 2020
Justin ponders the end of it all while giving life to a thrift store's expired items and turning kids' dreams of the future into a real bucket list.
18	6	"Know Fear"	May 15, 2020
Justin bares his worst nightmare as he strips down to perform at a nudist ranch, then conquers his fear of spicy foods with a few red-hot card tricks.
19	7	"Tradition"	May 15, 2020
For Justin, celebrating tradition includes some enchanting etiquette at a formal dinner party and breaking illusions out of a birthday piñata.

== Special Celebrity Guests ==
- Susan Sarandon, Season 2, Episode 1 (2019)
- Gogo Lomo-David, Season 1, Episode 4 (2018)
- Griffin Arnlund, Season 3, Episode 7 (2020)
- Andrew Lowe, Season 3, Episode 7 (2020)
- Tyrone Evans Clark, Season 3, Episode 3 (2020)
- Michael Vaccaro, Season 1, Episode 5 (2018)
- Mona Lee Wylde, Season 1, Episode 5 (2018)
