= Coming Home (British TV series) =

UK TV series

Coming Home is a British television family history series on BBC Wales that aired from 2004 to 2015. The shows follow celebrities as they trace their Welsh heritage and roots.

== List of series with subject and area covered ==
=== Series 1 (2004) ===
- 1 Donny Osmond (singer) – Merthyr Tydfil – 9 July 2004
- 2 Cilla Black (singer) – Wrexham and Holywell

=== Series 2 (2005) ===
- 1 Rolf Harris (entertainer) – Merthyr Tydfil
- 2 Susan Sarandon (actress) – Bridgend
- 3 Paul Daniels (magician) – Carmarthen
- 4 Patrick Mower (actor) – Carmarthen and Rhondda
- 5 Petula Clark (singer) – Merthyr Tydfil
- 6 Janet Street-Porter (journalist and broadcaster) – Llanfairfechan
- 7 Pam Ferris (actress) – Aberkenfig

=== Series 3 (2006) ===
- 1 Michael York (actor) – Llandeilo and Llandovery
- 2 Christopher Timothy (actor) – Bala
- 3 Olivia Newton-John (singer) – Cardiff
- 4 Michael Heseltine (politician) – Swansea

=== Series 4 (2009) ===
- 1 Michelle Collins (actress) – Pontypridd
- 2 Gabby Logan (presenter) – Cardiff
- 3 John Prescott (politician) – Prestatyn and Chirk
- 4 Samantha Bond (actress) – Abergwynfi, Cwmystwyth and Cilfynydd
- 5 Terry Jones (actor) – Colwyn Bay

=== Series 5 (2010) ===
- 1 Michael Sheen (actor) – Newport, Liverpool and Port Talbot
- 2 Siân Williams (news presenter) – Rhondda
- 3 Michael Ball (singer) – Cardiff
- 4 Ruth Madoc (actress) – Llanwnda and Llansamlet
- 5 Sarah Greene (presenter) – Cardiff – 22 December 2010

=== Series 6 (2011) ===
- 1 Neil Kinnock (politician) – Tredegar – 30 November 2011
- 2 Trevor Eve (actor) – Swansea and Glynneath – 7 December 2011
- 3 Alison Steadman (actress) – Trefarclawdd, Oswestry and Ruabon – 14 December 2011
- 4 Charles Dale (actor) – Tenby – 21 December 2011

=== Series 7 (2012) ===
- 1 Gethin Jones (presenter) – Barry and Pontyberem – 23 November 2012
- 2 Fiona Phillips (presenter) – Newport (Pembrokeshire) and Haverfordwest – 30 November 2012
- 3 Katherine Jenkins (singer) – Neath and Porthcawl – 7 December 2012
- 4 Robert Glenister (actor) – Gower – 14 December 2012

=== Series 8 (2013) ===
- 1 John Rhys-Davies (actor) – Ammanford – 29 November 2013
- 2 Tanni Grey-Thompson (paralympian, politician) – Cardiff – 6 December 2013
- 3 Shakin' Stevens (singer) – Cardiff – 13 December 2013
- 4 John Humphrys (journalist, broadcaster) – Cardiff – 16 December 2013

=== Series 9 (2014) ===
- 1 David Emanuel (fashion designer) – 5 December 2014
- 2 Ian Puleston-Davies (actor) – 8 December 2014
- 3 Alex Jones (presenter) – Llanelli and Carmarthenshire- 12 December 2014
- 4 Siân Lloyd (presenter) – Amlwch, Bethesda and Carmarthen – 15 December 2014

=== Series 10 (2015) ===
- 1 Sian Phillips
- 2 Ben Miller
- 3 Jeremy Bowen
- 4 Iwan Thomas
