= Soufra =

Catering company in Lebanon

Soufra (also known as Soufra Kitchen) is a catering company founded by Mariam Shaar in the refugee camp in Bourj el Barajneh in Beirut, Lebanon. It employs women in the camp where they attempt to revive traditional Palestinian dishes, sell them via their catering business and a food truck, and earn a livelihood.

== Documentary ==
Soufra was the subject of a documentary of the same name which was directed by Thomas Morgan and executive produced by Susan Sarandon. It released in 2017. The film won two awards at the 2018 San Diego International Film Festival including the Audience Award for Best Documentary.
