= Connected (2015 TV series) =

American documentary web series

- Genre: Documentary, Reality
- Created by: Ram Landes
- Based on: The Israeli format MEHUBARIM by Ram Landes and Doron Zabari
- Starring: Eli Bendet-Taicher; Ido Bendet-Taicher; Jonathan Bricklin; Nina Ferrer; Derek Gaines; Lori Levine; Rosie Noesi
- Theme music composer: Ophir Leibovitch
- Country of origin: United States
- Original language: English
- No. of seasons: 1
- No. of episodes: 20 (list of episodes)

Production
- Executive producers: Ram Landes; Ami Teer; Dave Oren; Jennifer Lebeau; Jeremy Chilnick; Michal Dagon; Ethan Goldman; Ran Harnevo; Nathan Hayden; Dermot McCormack; Tal Simantov; Morgan Spurlock; Neta Zwebner
- Production location: New York
- Running time: 25 minutes
- Production companies: Koda Communications; Warrior Poets

Original release
- Network: AOL On
- Release: March 31, 2015 – present

Connected is an American documentary web series on AOL On, executive produced by Morgan Spurlock. The first season, in which six NYC stories are included, was released on March 31, 2015. The show was adapted from the Israeli version with the same name MEHUBARIM מחוברים, originally produced by Koda Communications. The show's creators are Ram Landes and Doron Zabari and the director is Ami Teer.

The show follows six participants, each from a different background who film themselves with no crew involved, only using a hand-held video camera. The show's participants quickly become their own directors who are able to tell their own story using the cameras that they were given. During the production, about 2000 hours of raw footage was collected, which has been edited to 20 episodes of about 25 minutes each.

The original docu-drama format was sold to more than 17 production companies and distribution channels from countries including Denmark, France, Ireland, India, Norway, Finland and the US. The US version has been produced by Koda Communications, an Israeli production company created by Ram Landes, which produces the Israeli version as well.

Connected Season 1 Cast (from left to right): Jonathan, Derek, Lori, Nina, Eli and Ido, Rosie

== Episodes ==
No. overall	No. in season	Title	Directed by	Episode participants	Original release date
1	1	"Walking Up To The Pretty Girl"	Unknown	Jonathan Bricklin, Nina Ferrer, Derek Gaines	March 31, 2015
2	2	"Shooting Daggers"	Unknown	Lori Levine, Derek Gaines, Rosie Noesi	March 31, 2015
3	3	"In a Split Second"	Unknown	Jonathan Bricklin, Eli Bendet-Taicher, Ido Bendet-Taicher, Rosie Noesi	March 31, 2015
4	4	"Pick Your Battles"	Unknown	Nina Ferrer, Derek Gaines, Lori Levine	March 31, 2015
5	5	"Divorce Is the New Chanel"	Unknown	Lori Levine, Jonathan Bricklin, Rosie Noesi	April 13, 2015
6	6	"Spinning Life's Curveballs"	Unknown	Jonathan Bricklin, Eli Bendet-Taicher, Ido Bendet-Taicher, Rosie Noesi	April 13, 2015
7	7	"Tearing Down Walls"	Unknown	Lori Levine, Eli Bendet-Taicher, Ido Bendet-Taicher, Nina Ferrer	April 13, 2015
8	8	"It Must Be Thanksgiving"	Unknown	Derek Gaines, Eli Bendet-Taicher, Ido Bendet-Taicher, Lori Levine, Nina Ferrer	April 13, 2015
9	9	"Clashing Baggage"	Unknown	Jonathan Bricklin, Nina Ferrer, Derek Gaines	April 27, 2015
10	10	"Family Is Who You Make It"	Unknown	Lori Levine, Rosie Noesi, Derek Gaines	April 27, 2015
11	11	"Birth Plan"	Unknown	Nina Ferrer, Jonathan Bricklin, Derek Gaines	April 27, 2015
12	12	"Ready for the Adventure"	Unknown	Nina Ferrer, Eli Bendet-Taicher, Ido Bendet-Taicher, Jonathan Bricklin	April 27, 2015
13	13	"Marriage & Other Arrangements"	Unknown	Lori Levine, Jonathan Bricklin, Rosie Noesi	May 11, 2015
14	14	"The Journey"	Unknown	Lori Levine, Nina Ferrer, Eli Bendet-Taicher, Ido Bendet-Taicher	May 11, 2015
15	15	"Sex, Lies & Valentine's"	Unknown	Derek Gaines, Rosie Noesi, Nina Ferrer	May 11, 2015
16	16	"Rocking the Boat"	Unknown	Lori Levine, Eli Bendet-Taicher, Ido Bendet-Taicher, Rosie Noesi	May 11, 2015
17	17	"One Hell of a Ride"	Unknown	Nina Ferrer, Jonathan Bricklin, Eli Bendet-Taicher, Ido Bendet-Taicher	May 25, 2015
18	18	"Love & Restrictions"	Unknown	Jonathan Bricklin, Derek Gaines, Lori Levine	May 25, 2015
19	19	"Heading Home"	Unknown	Lori Levine, Eli Bendet-Taicher, Ido Bendet-Taicher, Derek Gaines	May 25, 2015
20	20	"Love Around the Corner"	Unknown	Rosie Noesi, Lori Levine, Eli Bendet-Taicher, Ido Bendet-Taicher, Derek Gaines	May 25, 2015
