= The Meddler =

2015 American film directed by Lorene Scafaria

- Theatrical release poster
- Directed by: Lorene Scafaria
- Written by: Lorene Scafaria
- Produced by: Joy Gorman Wettels
- Starring: Susan Sarandon; Rose Byrne; J. K. Simmons
- Cinematography: Brett Pawlak
- Edited by: Kayla M. Emter
- Music by: Jonathan Sadoff
- Production companies: Stage 6 Films; Anonymous Content
- Distributed by: Sony Pictures Classics
- Release dates: September 14, 2015 (TIFF); April 22, 2016 (United States)
- Running time: 100 minutes
- Country: United States
- Language: English
- Budget: $3.2 million
- Box office: $5.5 million

The Meddler is a 2015 American comedy-drama film written and directed by Lorene Scafaria. The film stars Susan Sarandon, Rose Byrne and J. K. Simmons. Principal photography began on March 30, 2015 in Los Angeles. It was screened in the Special Presentations section of the 2015 Toronto International Film Festival. The film was released on April 22, 2016, by Sony Pictures Classics and Stage 6 Films.

== Plot ==
Aging widow Marnie is lonely and heartbroken. When her daughter Lori moves to Los Angeles, for her work as a television screenwriter, Marnie follows in the hope of restarting her life. She begins interfering with Lori's life, constantly calling her and showing up at her house. This annoys Lori, who is currently seeing a therapist.

On Valentine's Day, Lori agrees to go out with Marnie. When they run into Lori's ex and his new girlfriend, Lori tries to act like she is also dating, but Marnie ruins it for her.

Marnie visits Lori's therapist, hoping to find out why her daughter acts the way she does but instead gets evaluated by her. The therapist believes that Marnie needs to sort out her own issues relating to the loss of her husband.

Marnie gradually learns to develop new friendships. She helps her tech friend Freddie, who she met while buying a new iPhone, with rides to his night classes. She volunteers at the hospital, upon Lori's suggestion, and helps a female stroke victim reconnect with her son.

At the baby shower of Lori's friend Emily, Marnie is introduced to Emily's divorced father-in-law, Mark. They have things in common, but she's not interested. Marnie offers to babysit for Lori's friend Jillian. As her own mom died when she was young, Jillian ends up taking her as a mom, especially as Marnie helps her pay for a proper wedding.

Freddie's brother Fredo gets a lift from Marnie, leaving a big bag of pot behind. She swallows all of it when a police officer approaches them as she is prepping Freddie for an upcoming exam. Shortly after, high, she meets Zipper, a retired cop who was on the set where she had inadvertently become an extra. Marnie and Zipper stay out all night talking and he introduces her to his chickens. He tells her his younger daughter Lizzie is estranged due to his divorce.

Marnie then goes back to NYC to see her daughter working on the pilot and to make her long overdue visit to her late husband's family. They want to discuss getting a headstone and distributing his ashes, but she isn't ready.

Back in LA, Lori asks Marnie to help get a pregnancy test kit but Marnie mistakenly gets an ovulation kit. After the rush of emotions and mix up, Lori apologizes for the way she had been acting. She explains that she misses her dad so found it hard to look at her. Marnie replies she feels the same but that she is not alone.

Marnie finally pours her husband's ashes in the ocean and gets arrested for it. After Zipper bails her out, they kiss and agree to go watch an action movie together. Back in her car, Marnie sees that she had three voicemails from Lori to which she listens and smiles.

Some time later, Marnie is happily settled into her L.A. life. She sends a voicemail to Lori asking about her current boyfriend and informing her of her intended trip with Zipper.

== Cast ==
- Susan Sarandon as Marnie
- Rose Byrne as Lori
- J. K. Simmons as Zipper
- Cecily Strong as Jillian
- Jerrod Carmichael as Freddy Fredo
- Michael McKean as Mark
- Jason Ritter as Jacob
- Billy Magnussen as Ben
- Lucy Punch as Emily
- Sarah Baker as Elaine
- Amy Landecker as Diane
- Casey Wilson as Trish
- Harry Hamlin as TV Dad
- Laura San Giacomo as TV Mom

== Production ==
Principal photography on the film began on March 30, 2015, in Los Angeles.

== Release ==
On August 25, 2015, Sony Pictures Classics acquired the North American rights to the film. The film had its world premiere at the 2015 Toronto International Film Festival on September 14, 2015 and also screened at the 2016 Tribeca Film Festival. The film was released on April 22, 2016.

== Reception ==
=== Critical response ===
On the review aggregator website Rotten Tomatoes, 85% of 145 critics' reviews are positive, with an average rating of 7.1/10. The website's consensus reads: "The Meddler transcends its cutesy title and familiar premise with a heartfelt look at family dynamics that's honored by a marvelous performance from Susan Sarandon." Metacritic, which uses a weighted average, assigned the film a score of 68 out of 100, based on 36 critics, indicating "generally favorable" reviews.

Peter Debruge of Variety gave the film a positive review, stating that "writer-director Lorene Scafaria’s sophomore feature returns to what works for her, as she draws upon personal experience to deliver a heartfelt dramedy that audiences are sure to appreciate. Bound to be among Sony Classics’ top 2016 performers, The Meddler serves as a lovely valentine not just to Scafaria’s mom, Gail, but to mothers everywhere — including the luminous Susan Sarandon in a role that seems to come naturally." Kevin Jaugernauth of Indiewire.com gave the film a B− writing : "But it’s the movie as it stands that must be assessed, and “The Meddler” is earnest and honest, perhaps much like Marnie. The character is eager to help and be involved, and the film carries much of that same spirit: it will try to please you with one thing, but if that doesn’t work, it has another way to make you smile just around the corner. And just like Marnie, it’s hard to resist."

Richard Lawson of Vanity Fair named it the best film of 2016.

=== Box office ===
The Meddler grossed $4.3 million in the United States and Canada, and $1.3 million in other territories, for a worldwide total of $5.5 million, against a budget of $3.2 million.
