= Xavier Mortimer =

French magician

- Mortimer performing in his Las Vegas show
- Born: 20 June 1980 (age 46); Briançon, France
- Occupation: Magician
- Website: www.xaviermortimer.com

Xavier Mortimer (born June 20, 1980) is a French magician and variety performer. A winner of multiple awards, he has appeared on television shows Penn & Teller: Fool Us, America's Got Talent, Masters of Illusion, Plus Grand Cabaret du Monde, and The Next Great Magician on ITV. Mortimer lives in Las Vegas and performs his resident show at the Strat.

== Early life ==
Xavier grew up in the city of Briançon, France. He studied at the Music and Dance Conservatory of La Rochelle. Xavier also attended the Desmond Jones Acting School in London and the Jacques Lecoq Acting School in Paris. He first witnessed magic at a local restaurant where a magician was performing. Xavier received a book from his father on magic and read it repeatedly to study.

In the 1990s, Xavier sold flowers at the local market on Sunday mornings to afford purchasing his first magic prop, a flying handkerchief. He became a member of the magic circle in France at the age of 15 and subscribed to clubs to see live theater and street performing art centers. In his mid teens, Xavier took up juggling, acrobatics, and accordion.

== Career ==
At the age of eighteen, Xavier teamed up with the acrobat Thibaud De Premorel to form an act called Les Fréres (The Brothers). Together they performed at concerts and corporate events. In September 2005, Xavier opened his one-man show in Paris called L’Ombre Orchestre (The Shadow Orchestra) at Theatre Le Temple in Paris.

He toured his show and performed at Crazy Horse in Paris, Just for Laughs in Montreal, and the Edinburgh Fringe Festival, where he was seen by Cirque du Soleil in 2009. He was offered a role in Cirque's production of ‘Michael Jackson ONE’ in Las Vegas and performed in the show for 3 years.

During his 3 years with Cirque, Xavier, spent his evenings developing new material. He was approached by Producer Alex Goude and together they created his show ‘Magical Dream’ which opened at the Sin City Theater at Planet Hollywood casino on June 6, 2016. The show moved from Planet Hollywood to Bally's in January 2019, where it occurs nightly.

Xavier expanded his performances to include online content in the later part of 2019. He partnered with many celebrities such as Rick Lax, Jason Derulo, and Justin Flom to create collaborative online video projects. Xavier’s online videos have been viewed over 2 billion times.

In 2020, he fooled the Duo Penn and Teller, and gathered more than 10M followers online in one year as well as over 4 Billion views.

In 2021, he opened a brand new and more grandiose show at The Strat Casino in Las Vegas, The Dream Maker. It closed its doors on December 30, 2022.

In 2022, Xavier's video "Impossible Balance" was the second most viewed short video of all time on YouTube with 576 million views.

In 2023 he joins « The Illusionists » for a World Tour.

In 2024 he launched his show XtraOrdinaire for a world tour.

In March 2025, he performed at the CIBC Theatre Chicago.

== Notable illusions ==
Mortimer’s most original effects are:

- Jumprope Levitation
- Scarf to Snake.
- Superhuman Shopping
- Haunted Lemon

== Awards ==
- International CMI meeting in Italy 2003
- Mandrake d'or award 2010
- Las Vegas Review Journal Best of Vegas awards:
  - Gold Best Magic Show 2018
  - Gold Best Family-Friendly Show 2019
  - Bronze Best Magic Show 2019
  - Gold Best Family-Friendly Show 2020
  - Gold Best Magic Show 2020
  - Gold Best Resident Performer/Headliner 2020
  - Gold Best Value Show 2020
  - Gold Best Family-Friendly Show 2021
  - Gold Best Magic Show 2021
  - Silver Best Resident Performer/Headliner 2021
  - Gold Best Value Show 2021
  - Gold Best Production Show 2021
- Penn and Teller: Fool Us: Fooler 2020
