= Stuart MacLeod =

Stuart MacLeod may refer to:

- Stuart MacLeod (magician)
- Stuart MacLeod (musician), Australian guitarist in Eskimo Joe
