= James Galea =

Australian magician

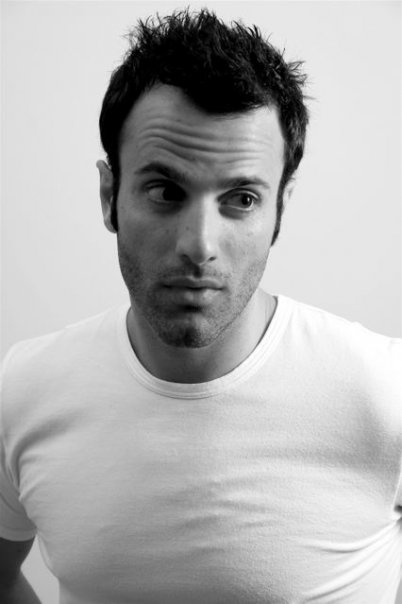
- Born: 1981 (age 44–45); Sydney, Australia
- Occupations: Magician, illusionist, actor
- Known for: 673 King St; Band of Magicians
- Website: www.jamesgalea.com

James Galea (born 1981) is an Australian magician and actor based in Sydney and Los Angeles.

== Early life and education ==
Galea was introduced to the art of magic at the age of 14. He spent most of his youth studying sleight of hand magic, practicing for eight hours a day. He also attended Marcellin College Randwick, graduating in 1998.

== Career ==
In 1999, at age 18, Galea performed at James Packer's first wedding. That same year also saw him open his own stage show in Japan.

In 2002, Galea became the Australian Close-Up Magic Champion. In 2005 and 2006, Galea headlined venues, including the famed Magic Castle in Hollywood and the Flamingo Hotel & Casino in Las Vegas. On returning from the United States, Galea filmed a six-part series for the Nine Network titled Urban Magic.

After a chance meeting in 2007, Galea teamed up with writer, actor, and director Nicholas Hammond to co-write the play Lying Cheating Bastard. The plot follows the story of infamous Australian con-man Jimmy Garcia (aka "Cricket"), a young man drawn into the seedy underbelly of Sydney, and how he became the most successful con-man in Australia by the age of 27. The play toured around Australia to rave reviews.

In 2008, Galea premiered his one-man show I Hate Rabbits at Sydney's Enmore Theatre to a sell-out audience. The show featured in the 2009 Adelaide Fringe before heading to the Forum Theatre in Melbourne as part of the 2009 Melbourne International Comedy Festival. During the Melbourne season, Galea appeared in the nationwide broadcast of the Melbourne International Comedy Festival Gala Show and performed his award-winning routine 673 King Street. The routine went viral on YouTube, receiving over 3.4 million views.

He was then asked to appear on The Ellen DeGeneres Show where his performance of 673 King Street again went viral, receiving an additional 3.4 million views on YouTube.

That same year, Rose Tinted Enterprises was founded by James Galea and producer Jo Dyer, who together brought their specific expertise in producing magic and comedy across all platforms. Galea and Dyer have since successfully produced magic-based television and theatre together, including Band of Magicians, I Hate Rabbits, Lying Cheating Bastard and James Galea's Best Trick Ever

In 2012, Galea co-hosted the Discovery Channel series Breaking Magic (also known as Magic of Science), which "fused the showmanship and mystery of magic with the raw power of science", and was filmed on location in London, New York, and Warsaw. The series also featured Wayne Houchin, Billy Kidd, and Ben Hanlin. During a dangerous stunt gone wrong, Galea fell 50 feet onto scaffolding and the accident proved nearly fatal.

In 2013, Galea teamed up with director Adam Franklin, in a partnership that would continue on future projects, to write the lyrics and music, produce, and star in the musical short film The Magician. The film, which was shortlisted for Tropfest, also features Brett Loudermilk, Peter Stickles, Bonnie Morgan, Gabe Grifoni and Beejan Land.

In 2014, Galea created the magic supergroup Band of Magicians which had its world premiere at Sydney Festival. The band joined forces and performed a string of sold-out performances in Australia. The band then toured New Zealand in 2015 before heading to the Las Vegas Strip and setting up residency at Tropicana Las Vegas in 2016. Band of Magicians has featured Justin Flom, Justin Willman, Nate Staniforth, Ben Hanlin, Brett Loudermilk, Adam Mada, Joel Ward, and Stuart McLeod.

In 2015, Galea began developing an animated children's magic musical, I Wish I Was a Wizard. He wrote the music and lyrics and worked on the show with his musical collaborator Ben Palacios.

In 2016, Galea filmed James Galea's Best Trick Ever for ABC which premiered in Australia in 2017 and was released internationally in 2018. The show features incredible tricks and illusions from Galea, in addition to astounding magic from those he interviews. The show pulled back the curtain on one of the world's greatest card sharks who revealed some of his most closely guarded secrets. Guests from season one included Blake Vogt, Todd Robbins, Anastasia Synn, Brett Loudermilk, Barry & Stuart, Chris Kenner, Dan & Dave Buck, Lawrence Leung, Adam Mada, Meir Yedid, DOC, and Rove McManus.

In 2018, POOF - Secrets of a Magician!, for which Galea wrote the music and lyrics in 2012, is set to premiere at Melbourne Comedy Festival. The outrageous show ponders magic's big questions, including, "What If I Could Really Do Magic?", "Are All Magicians Gay?", and "Why All Psychics Are C&*ts" through magic, story, and songs by the piano.
