= MagicAid =

501(c)(3) non-profit organization and program

MagicAid Inc.
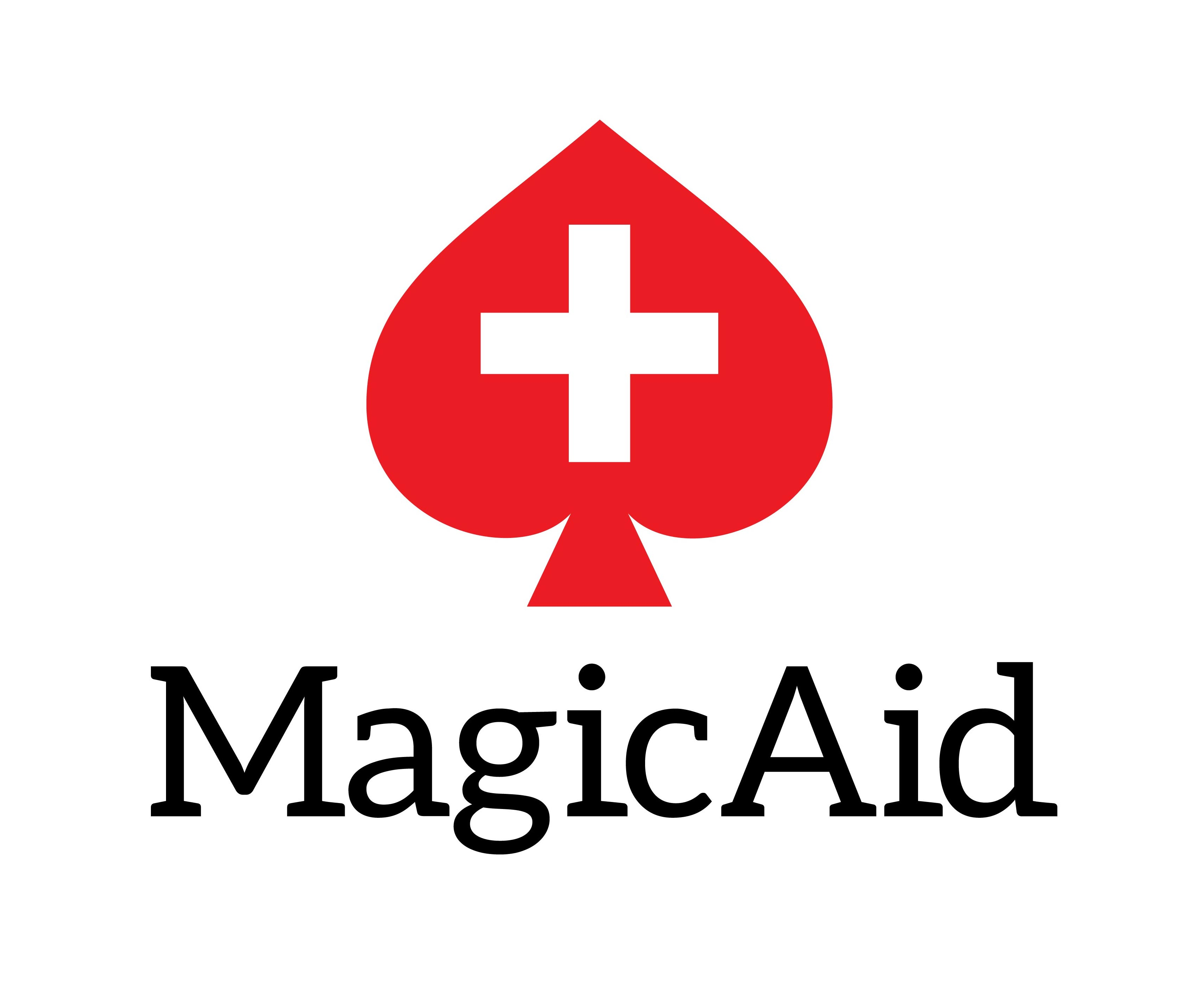
- Founders: David Elkin; Harrison Pravder; Tony Wan
- Type: Non-profit organization; 501(c)(3)
- Key people: David Elkin (President); Harrison Pravder (Vice President; Research Director); Justin Willman (Magic Director)
- Website: magic-aid.org

MagicAid is a 501(c)(3) non-profit organization and program that uses magic tricks to improve the hospitalization experience for pediatric patients and encourage the delivery of compassionate healthcare. MagicAid teaches health professional students to perform magic tricks within a hospital setting at the bedside. They then facilitate the ability of these students to perform for pediatric patients in the hospital. Their goals include building the patient relationship, promoting patient empowerment, facilitating patient coping, and encouraging psychological and physical improvement. They also conduct research to evaluate and improve their magic programme.

MagicAid's origins trace back to Stony Brook University School of Medicine where the group's founders were medical students. They created a student interest group at the school that developed into the current non-profit organization. MagicAid currently services 13 medical centers in the United States, mostly serving the New York tristate area.

== Origin ==
MagicAid's president, David Elkin, performed magic in hospitals in a volunteer capacity in Los Angeles prior to attending medical school. Upon attending medical school at Stony Brook University School of Medicine, his classmates became interested in learning magic and performing for patients. This led to a small group of students who performed for patients in Stony Brook University Hospital (Stony Brook, NY). Before long, these students founded the non-profit organization and it has developed from that time. It was initially led by David Elkin and Harrison Pravder.

== Research ==
MagicAid has made it part of their mission to develop a curriculum within an evidence-based framework by conducting research into their form of "magic therapy". They have presented their research internationally. Their first research study, published in Hospital Pediatrics, reported benefits of their therapy on alleviating pediatric patient and caregiver anxiety by nearly 25%. Research reported that 98% of physicians and nurses are in support of the continuance and expansion of the activities of MagicAid with medical students. The program was also reported to be beneficial for hospital staff. MagicAid publications have been published in The Lancet, BMC Medical Education, and Medical Science Educator.

MagicAid is currently planning projects in medical education, anesthesiology, and emergency medicine. Dr. Harrison Pravder is their Research Director.

== Structure ==
MagicAid has divisions of medical students, Child Life Specialists, and clinicians. Their mission is to create self-sustaining groups wherever they visit.

MagicAid's originated as a medical student service group at Stony Brook School of Medicine. Since then, several more chapters have been formed by medical students at Yale, Cornell, Loma Linda, New York Medical College, NYU, and other medical schools. Trained students provide "magic rounds," spending roughly an hour a visit on an inpatient pediatric floor, in the Emergency Department, or at pediatric cancer units where they hope to alleviate the stressors of the hospital experience by engaging pediatric patients in magic. The structure was built to be maintained with minimal outside guidance—as each new student class year begins, senior students train incoming new students. MagicAid provides these groups with magic supplies, as needed. The organization strives to create an experience for the medical students to learn. They teach the students to practice compassion, empathy, and effective communication with patients and their families.

MagicAid relies on donations from the public and fundraising activities to support their activities.

== COVID-19 Pandemic ==
In response to the COVID-19 pandemic, MagicAid began hosting virtual magic shows for hospitalized patients. On August 14, 2020, MagicAid started this phase with a "MagicAid Live!" event hosted by their Magic Director, Justin Willman. Dozens of children's hospitals around the United States participated with more than 2,000 patients reached. Children directly participated in the event through internet-enable devices. Additional shows have been conducted reaching dozens of children's hospitals and thousands of patients.

During the pandemic, MagicAid moved many other of its operations to virtually or socially-distanced platforms in order to continue providing voluntary magic therapy to pediatric patients.
