= Lee A. Fleisher =

American anesthesiologist

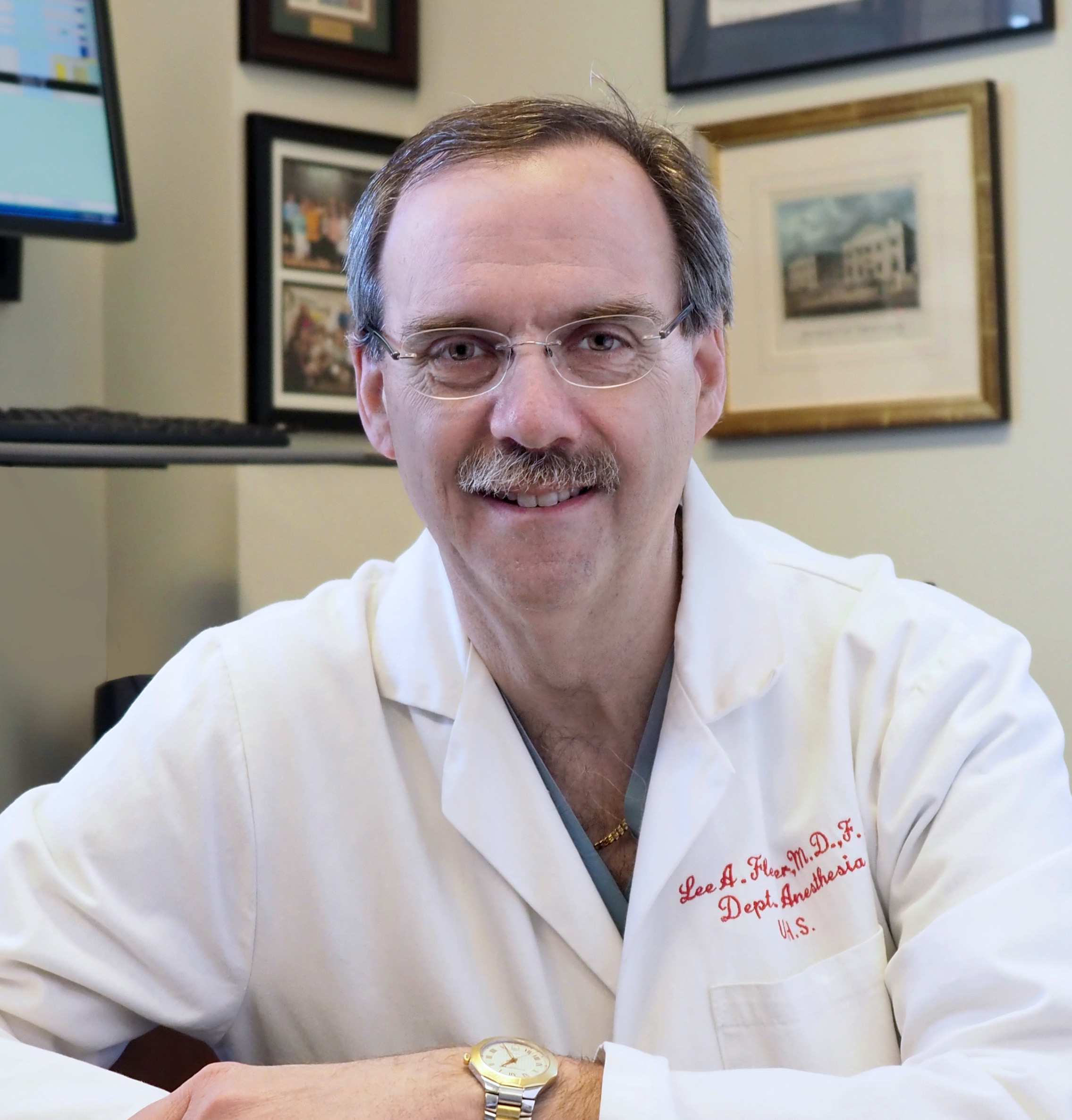
- Fleisher in 2018

Academic background
- Education: BA, Molecular Biology, 1981, University of Pennsylvania; MD, 1986, Renaissance School of Medicine at Stony Brook University, ML, 2024 University of Pennsylvania School of Law
- Website: www.rubrumadvising.com

Lee Alan Fleisher is an American anesthesiologist and health policy expert. In 2020, Fleisher was named Chief Medical Officer and Director of the Centers for Medicare & Medicaid Services Center for Clinical Standards and Quality. He previously served as Chair of Anesthesiology and Critical Care at the Perelman School of Medicine at the University of Pennsylvania and continues to practice clinically. He is also the Founding Principal and CEO at Rubrum Advising.

== Early life and education ==
Fleisher graduated Cheltenham High School and began his undergraduate degree at the University of Pennsylvania in 1978. He completed his Bachelor's degree in Molecular Biology in 1981, graduating six months early, and his medical degree from Renaissance School of Medicine at Stony Brook University. He initially intended to pursue a career as a transplant surgeon and researcher but changed his mind following his surgical residency to pursue anesthesiology. In 2024, he received his master's in law from the University of Pennsylvania Carey Law School.

== Career ==
Following his medical degree, Fleisher began at the Johns Hopkins School of Medicine (JHU), serving as both vice chairman for clinical research and director of operating rooms. In 2004 he was named the Robert D. Dripps Professor and Chair of Anesthesiology and Critical Care and Professor of Medicine at the Perelman School of Medicine at the University of Pennsylvania (UPenn). Fleisher also chaired the American Heart Association/American College of Cardiology Task Force on Guidelines on Perioperative Cardiovascular Evaluation, focusing on risk assessment and defining best practices for patients undergoing noncardiac surgery. In 2007, Fleisher was elected a member of the National Academy of Medicine (then referred to as the Institute of Medicine) and served on Committees including the Board of Health Services of the NAM.

In July 2020, during the COVID-19 pandemic, Fleisher was named the Chief Medical Officer and Director of the Centers for Medicare & Medicaid Services Center for Clinical Standards and Quality. In this capacity, he was responsible for executing all national clinical, quality, and safety standards for healthcare facilities and providers, as well as establishing coverage determinations for items and services that improve health outcomes for Medicare beneficiaries. While serving in this role, Fleisher co-authored the article Charting a Roadmap for Value-based Surgery in the Post-pandemic Era in the Annals of Surgery journal. Working with the Centers for Disease Control and Prevention, Fleisher co-authored the article Health Care Safety during the Pandemic and Beyond — Building a System That Ensures Resilience in the New England Journal of Medicine.

Presently, Fleisher is Emeritus Professor of Anesthesiology and Critical Care at the University of Pennsylvania Perelman School of Medicine and continues to practice clinically. He serves as a Senior Advisor of the Bipartisan Policy Center and FasterCures of the Milken Institute, Senior Fellow of the Leonard Davis Institute of Health Economics and Visiting Fellow of the Duke-Margolis Institute for Health Policy. He is a member of the Steering Committee of CHAI (Coalition of Health AI) and of the Health Information Technology Advisory Committee of the Office of the National Coordinator for Health Information Technology (ONC). In 2023, he became the Founding Principal and CEO of Rubrum Advising, a healthcare advising firm dedicated to improving patient care.

== Selected publications ==
- Essence of Anesthesia Practice: Expert Consult
- Anesthesia and Uncommon Diseases
- Essence of Anesthesia Practice
- Complications in Anesthesia
