= Adam Mada =

Australian magician

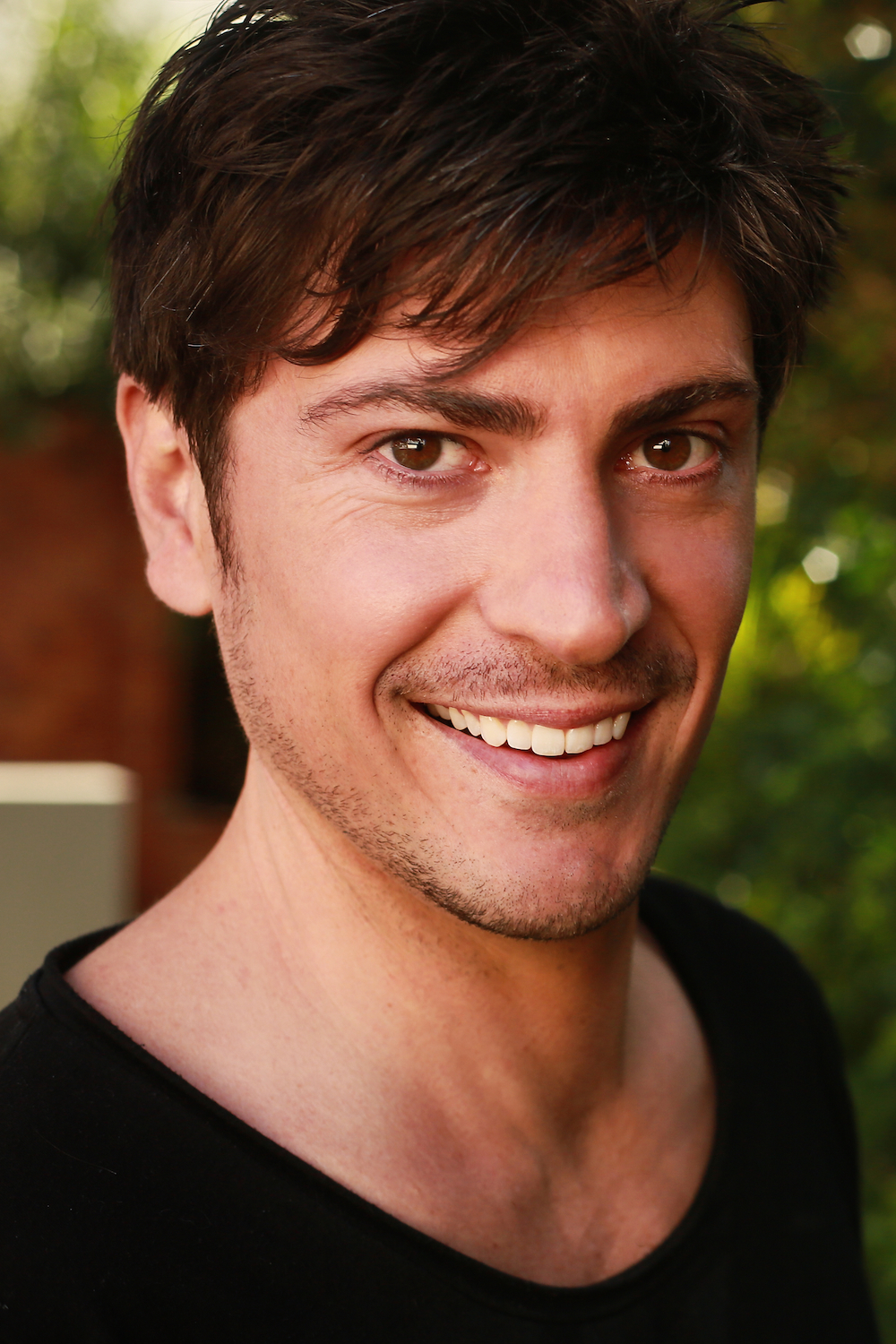
- Born: Adam Brindley; 1979 (age 46–47); Canberra, Australia
- Other name: The Wizard of Oz
- Occupations: magician, entertainer, magic/Illusion designer & director, speaker and magic consultant
- Known for: Possum Magic, Harry Potter and the Cursed Child (Australia), Band of Magicians, Magic Teapot.

Adam Brindley (born 1979), known professionally as Adam Mada and The Wizard of Oz is an Australian magician, entertainer and magic consultant. Mada is the magic and illusion consultant for the National Institute of Dramatic Art, Australia's Got Talent, The Metaverse of Magic and previously served as The Australian Magic & Illusion Associate for the Melbourne premiere of Harry Potter and the Cursed Child.

== Early life ==
Mada became interested in magic in his youth performing for family, friends and private functions before deciding to pursue magic full-time when he was 21. He attended the Jeff McBride Magic Masterclass in Las Vegas, USA with Eugene Burger and has studied conjuring theory with mentors from South Africa, Venezuela, France, Singapore and Australia. Mada is a scholar of magic interested in the social dynamics of performance magic, often advising academics and artists on magic theory and practice

== Professional career ==
=== 2009 - FBi Radio ===
Mada hosted weekly radio segment 'Wonder Thunder' for FBi radio station in 2009, presenting the history of magic and performing effects live on air.

=== 2010 - 2015 - Television and Mada's Marvels ===
Mada appeared alongside magicians Nicholas J. Johnson and Clare Werbeloff in the 2010 series The Real Hustle for Channel 9. He consulted on Sleeping Beauty, creating an illusion for the film's opening sequence. In "Binge", an episode of ABC Television documentary Whatever! The Science of Teens, he worked with Neuroscientist John Currie Prof. John Currie to illustrate the effects of binge drinking in teenagers by applying magic techniques to memory tests.

During the 2012 season of reality television competition Australia's Got Talent, Mada collaborated with choreographer Sarah Boulter on a levitation routine for her dance group Ev & Bow.

In 2012, Mada worked with choreographer Farhan Hassan and costume designer Glenna Ng to create 'The Chamber of Secrets Magic Show' at the National Drama Center in Singapore.

He worked with Australian Author Tara Moss on her novel Siren.

In 2013 Journalist Joe Hildebrand invited Mada to speak about invisibility on a panel at the Museum of Contemporary Art Australia including other speakers Brian Schmidt and Ron McCallum.

He headlined the Hoopla Festival in 2014 with his show Mada's Marvels.

He joined the 2014 Tour of Band of Magicians, joining James Galea, Ben Hanlin and Brett Loudermilk.

=== 2016 - Fooling Copperfield and India Tour ===
In 2016, he was invited by Australian Radio Station 2Day FM to design and teach a trick to Angus O'Laughlin. The trick was performed to illusionist David Copperfield backstage at the Copperfield Theatre in Las Vegas. Copperfield was fooled by the illusion. Later that year, he performed with Ash Hodgkinson and Lucas Itrawan at the Royal Bombay Yacht Club to celebrate the life of India's famous radio broadcaster the late Hamid Sayani brother of Ameen Sayani. Hodgkinson later garnered a large TikTok following, and is known as Ash Magic. His show Mada's Marvels toured India with Author and researcher John Zubrzycki.

He served as producer for the initial Short and Sweet Magic and Comedy festival, and coached 2014 Junior Australian Magic Champion CARDISTRY.

=== 2019 - Present ===
Mada has taken on a number of professional, long term engagements as a Magic and Illusion Director, Associate and Design including for National Institute of Dramatic Art (NIDA), the original Melbourne production of Harry Potter and the Cursed Child and Possum Magic. In 2023, he was the Magic and Illusion designer for a new interactive magic variety show, Metaverse of Magic.

== Philanthropy & Charity Work ==
Mada has contributed to several charity organisations with performances, workshops and fund raising. Notably Mada headlined the World Aids Day Gala in 2013, for the Aids Trust of Australia in 2012 Adam was WWF Earth Hour ambassador, prompting criticism from journalist Andrew Bolt. In 2013 Mada became an ambassador for the Starlight Children's Foundation He is a coach for the starlight captains as well as raising funds form his public shows as part of the Melbourne Magic Festival Mada's Marvels

He has spoken publicly about the need for better support for small business, especially in the arts and entertainment sector.
