= John Stessel =

American magician and mentalist

- Occupations: Magician, mentalist, illusion designer
- Website: johnstessel.com

John Stessel is an American magician, mentalist, and illusion designer based in New York City.

== Career ==
Stessel began performing magic as a child and created Flush, a linking rubber band effect, while in high school; it was later released commercially by the magic publisher Vanishing Inc.

In 2014, Stessel appeared as a competitor on the Syfy series Wizard Wars. He later served as head magic consultant for The Magician, a show featuring Dan White produced by theory11 at the NoMad Hotel in New York City.

In 2019, The New York Times noted Stessel's Saturday-night performances at the Red Rabbit Club in Manhattan's Meatpacking District, writing that he "does everything but pull a red rabbit out of a hat." In 2026, Flaunt reported the announcement of his residency at the Moxy Chelsea hotel, described as "a close-up evening of contemporary magic and mind-reading."

Stessel has been a recurring guest on Elvis Duran and the Morning Show.

In 2026, Stessel served as magic producer on The Puzzle Room with David Kwong, a Netflix video podcast hosted by magician David Kwong and produced by Pod People, which premiered in May 2026.

== Magic for Shelter Dogs ==
Beginning in 2018, Stessel gained attention for performing magic tricks for dogs at animal shelters to encourage adoptions. A holiday video produced with TBS at the Town of Hempstead Animal Shelter in New York was covered by People and HuffPost. The project, produced with St. Hubert's Animal Welfare Center, was a finalist in the Shorty Impact Awards nonprofit partnership category.

In 2023, the project was featured on ABC's Good Morning America and covered by Newsweek, which reported that Stessel had spent five years performing for adoptable dogs.
