= Hubworld =

- Presented by: Justin "Kredible" Willman
- Country of origin: United States
- No. of seasons: 2
- No. of episodes: 52

Production
- Executive producers: Kathy Samuels; Stephen Davis
- Running time: 22 minutes (Approx.)
- Production companies: Natural 9 Entertainment; Hasbro Studios

Original release
- Network: The Hub
- Release: November 5, 2010 – October 29, 2011

Hubworld is a defunct American news magazine television series on The Hub. It was produced by Natural 9 Entertainment in association with Hasbro Studios. The program premiered on November 5, 2010 and was hosted by actor/magician Justin "Kredible" Willman.

== Program summary ==
Hubworld provided a survey of current programs then on The Hub, including shows such as Family Game Night, the network's animated franchises such as G.I. Joe: Renegades, Transformers: Prime, Dan Vs. and My Little Pony: Friendship Is Magic. Segments included Willman's comedic news and current events monologue called "Back it Up", and "Hub Happenings", which involved Willman riffing on short clips of Hub programming.

Other segments included interviews of current pop music stars, celebrities and sports stars, press line interviews at film premieres, junket interviews of film stars, and features involving children doing good in their communities and throughout the world. An ending segment featured musician Danny Tieger singing a song about the news events of the week in a segment called "Just to Let You Know News Jam".
