= Nate Staniforth =

American magician (born 1982)

- Born: 1982 (age 43–44)
- Occupation: Magician
- Website: www.natestaniforth.com

Nathan William Staniforth is an American magician. He is best known as one of the magicians in season 2 of the Discovery Channel show Breaking Magic.

== Early life ==
Staniforth was born in 1982 to Arthur and Jayne Staniforth. His Staniforth family has links to Quebec, and are originally from the United Kingdom. Growing up in Ames, Iowa, he attended Ames High School, graduating in 2001. He graduated with a B.A in History and Religion from the University of Iowa and then began working as a magician in Los Angeles before touring the country.

== Career ==
He grew up performing in local venues around Iowa, and soon caught media attention. In 2016, he appeared on the ITV series The Next Great Magician where he performed with the cast from the Charlie and the Chocolate Factory musical That same year he appeared on Harry Connick Jr's television talk show Harry. The following year he was chosen to co-host Season 2 of the Discovery Channel show Breaking Magic which sees him traveling the U.S and Europe performing street magic. In the show he is most commonly performing solo card tricks as well as illusions. The show has gained him international recognition.

On January 16, 2018, he released his autobiography titled Here Is Real Magic: A Magician's Search for Wonder in the Modern World. On February 15, 2018, Staniforth appeared on the Today Show where he performed a trick for journalist Megyn Kelly.

He has also hosted TED Talks at the University of Iowa related to his profession, as well as the emotions of those impacted by magic tricks.

Staniforth toured with fellow magicians James Galea, Justin Flom, Justin Willman under the group name Band of Magicians which formed in 2014.

== Works cited ==
- Staniforth, Nate (2018). Here Is Real Magic: A Magician's Search for Wonder in the Modern World. United States: Bloomsbury Publishing. 256pp. ISBN 9781632864260.
