= Stony Brook Southampton Hospital =

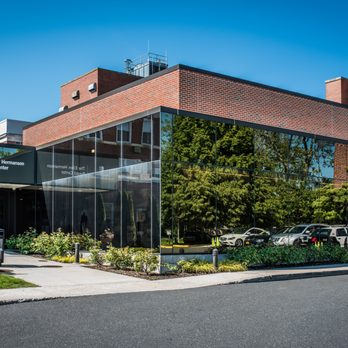
- Entrance to the Ellen Hermanson Breast Center

Geography
- Location: 240 Meeting House Lane, Southampton, NY, United States
- Coordinates: 40.8851°N 72.3802°W

Organization
- Type: Community
- Affiliated university: Stony Brook University Hospital; Stony Brook University School of Medicine

Services
- Emergency department: Level III trauma center
- Beds: 125

Helipads
- Helipad: No (Designated landing zone only)

History
- Founded: 1909

Links
- Website: southampton.stonybrookmedicine.edu
- Lists: Hospitals in the United States

Stony Brook Southampton Hospital, centrally located in the Village of Southampton, New York, is a 125-bed hospital accredited by the Joint Commission. A location of Stony Brook Medicine, Stony Brook Southampton Hospital is a New York State-designated Primary Stroke Center, Level I Perinatal Center, and the home of the first Level III trauma center on the East End of Long Island. The hospital admits more than 6,000 patients annually and has about 25,000 emergency department visits each year (about 50% during the summer season). The hospital officially became part of the Stony Brook Medicine healthcare system on August 1, 2017.

== History ==
In 1909, the Southampton Hospital Association bought the Hervey J. Topping house on the corner of Lewis Street and Meeting House Lane and planned to build the hospital on an adjoining lot. In 1911, Samuel Parrish donated 2.5 acres (1.0 ha) on Old Town Road, stretching from Meeting House Lane to Herrick Road, where the present hospital opened in 1913 and still stands today. The plans for the original hospital building were donated by society architect T. Markoe Robertson, and were designed to be able to grow. Over the next few decades, the original facility was expanded with several wings and off-site buildings, including the Parrish Memorial Hall, Schenck Memorial Building, and Todd Nursing Home.

The Audrey and Martin Gruss Heart & Stroke Center opened in 2015. As part of the hospital's merger with the Stony Brook Medicine health system, the Center gained a new cardiac catheterization laboratory, which is the first on South Fork.

In 2016, the hospital was the first on the East End to be designated as a trauma center. It then earned ACS-verification in May 2021.

The Phillips Family Cancer Center opened in 2019. The facility contains South Fork's first radiation oncology unit.

Southampton Hospital joined the Stony Brook Medicine health system in 2017, and was renamed Stony Brook Southampton Hospital.

In August 2020, plans were announced to build a freestanding emergency department in East Hampton, slated to cost between $35 million and $40 million. The facility received a $10 million state grant and the philanthropic campaign has raised another $38 million as of 2022. Perkins Eastman was selected to design the project, and construction began in May 2022. The facility opened in Spring 2025.

== Future ==
In 2019, the Southampton Hospital Association announced a planned $305 million relocation of Southampton Hospital to 15 acres on the campus of Stony Brook Southampton . Rafael Viñoly Architects and HKS Architects were named to design the new campus. The project was originally anticipated to be completed by 2023, but was delayed due to the COVID-19 pandemic. The new hospital is scheduled for a 2030 opening date.

== Associated charities ==
The Southampton Hospital Foundation, a separate nonprofit corporation with an independent Board of Trustees, supports Stony Brook.

== Notable births ==
- Jacqueline Kennedy Onassis (1929–1994), First Lady of the United States. The first, First Lady to be born in a hospital.
