= Band of Magicians =

American magician

Band of Magicians is a touring illusion show featuring a group of magicians billed as "The World’s First Magic Supergroup". The original group featured magicians James Galea, Justin Flom, Justin Willman, and Nate Staniforth. The current group includes James Galea, Stuart MacLeod, Brett Loudermilk, and Joel Ward.

The group is unique because magicians traditionally perform as solo or duo acts, and sometimes with assistants who rarely share top-billing. Other touring shows featuring multiple magicians, such as The Illusionists and The Supernaturalists, feature an assortment of solo acts with performers rarely sharing the stage at the same time. The Band of Magicians was conceived as a way to perform illusions that individual performers couldn't get away with alone. Galea has said, "What we've done with this is create brand-new illusions for the show that could not be done by anyone else. Simply for the fact that it takes four professional magicians to be able to misdirect the audience and do the magic. It's not possible for one magician to do with three assistants. You need magicians to pull them off."

== History ==
In 2014, Australian magician James Galea formed the Band of Magicians with Americans Justin Flom, Justin Willman, and Nate Staniforth. The group performed a string of sold-out performances at the 2014 Sydney Festival in Sydney, Australia.

In 2015, the original group of four performed from 7 to 17 January at the Crown Melbourne, in Melbourne, Australia. From August to September, Galea toured New Zealand with new performers Ben Hanlin, Brett Loudermilk, and Adam Mada. The tour included shows in Dunedin, Taranaki, Auckland, and Christchurch.

In 2016, Galea and Loudermilk, along with new performers Stuart MacLeod and Joel Ward performed for three weeks at the Tropicana Las Vegas.
