= Baking Impossible =

Netflix reality television series

- Presented by: Justin Willman
- Judges: Andrew Smyth; Joanne Chang; Hakeem Oluseyi
- Original language: English
- No. of seasons: 1
- No. of episodes: 8

Production
- Running time: 44 minutes

Original release
- Network: Netflix
- Release: October 6 – October 13, 2021

Baking Impossible is an American cooking competition television series that airs on Netflix, themed around baking and engineering. Each episode presents a cast of contestants with a challenge that combines baking with engineering, often described using the portmanteau "bakineering".

The series officially premiered on October 6, 2021, with judges Andrew Smyth ("bakineering" specialist), Joanne Chang (baking specialist), and Hakeem Oluseyi (engineering specialist). The show is presented by host Justin Willman.

== Format ==
The contestants compete in pairs, for a grand prize of $100,000. Within each pair, one contestant specializes in baking, and the other specializes in engineering. Prior to the show, none of the pairs of contestants had met before.

Each episode allows the contestant to work for up to 18 hours, after which their creations are stress tested and evaluated by the judges. At the end of each episode, one pair is voted off. The winning team of the episode gets an advantage in the next episode, such as being able to preview the stress test before the other teams, or being able to attempt the stress test more than once. Even such things as being immune to elimination for the next round.

== Episodes ==
No.	Title	Original release date
1	"Whatever Floats Your Boat"	October 6, 2021
Challenge: Create a 2ft long sailboat that is remote-controllable, and must be cake-based and completely edible, other than steering mechanisms. Stress Test: Navigate a water course in 45 seconds. Winning Team: Cindy and Taylor Eliminated Team: Sierra and Edwin
2	"Off to the Robot Races"	October 6, 2021
Challenge: Create an edible robot containing a jelly-filled dessert. Stress Test: Navigate an obstacle course, featuring dessert-themed obstacles. Winning Team: Cindy and Taylor Eliminated Team: Nina and Hannah
3	"Sweet Chain Reactions"	October 6, 2021
Challenge: Create an edible chain reaction machine, consisting of three simple machines and a large themed dessert. Stress Test: Run the machine uninterrupted, such that it reveals the finale dessert at the end of the chain reaction. Winning Team: Sara and Rodolfo Eliminated Team: Vanessa and Shanice
4	"Fore! The Love of Mini Golf"	October 6, 2021
Challenge: Create an edible mini golf course. Instead of competing in pairs, the set of contestants competed in two larger teams. Stress Test: The judges needed to be able to play the golf course. Winning Team: Steve and Renee Eliminated Team: Joey and Mario
5	"Cake on the Catwalk"	October 6, 2021
Challenge: Create an edible costume for a human model, containing four confections. The models were previously eliminated contestants. Stress Test: The human model needs to be able to walk a 40ft runway wearing the costume, and the costume must contain the confections for the judges to sample. Winning Team: Brandi and Menuka Eliminated Team: Randi and Jacob
6	"Baking to New Heights"	October 6, 2021
Challenge: Create an "edible city block" featuring a five foot tall gingerbread skyscraper and two cake structures. Stress Test: The skyscrapers had to withstand a shake table for one minute. Winning Team: Sara and Rodolfo Eliminated Team: Steve and Renee
7	"Crash Test Yummy"	October 13, 2021
Challenge: Create a five foot by eight foot edible car, with two edible safety features and a trunk made of cake. Stress Test: The cars needed to survive a 25 mile per hour crash test simulation, with a dummy passenger. Winning Team: Cindy and Taylor Eliminated Team: Brandi and Menuka
8	"Bridge to Victory"	October 13, 2021
Challenge: Create a four foot long moving bridge, with two foot long cake "land masses". Stress Tests: The bridges were tested by: A boat traveling under the bridge.; A car driving over the bridge.; A set of weights stacked onto the bridge.; Winning Team: Sara and Rodolfo Team that came 2nd: Cindy and Taylor

== Elimination Table ==
Place	Team	Episodes							
Place	Team	1	2	3	4	5	6	7	8
1	Sara and Rodolfo	SAFE	SAFE	WIN	RISK	RISK	WIN	SAFE	WINNER
2	Cindy and Taylor	WIN	WIN	SAFE	WIN	SAFE	RISK	WIN	RUNNER-UP
3	Brandi and Menuka	SAFE	2ND	RISK	RISK	WIN	2ND	ELIM	
4	Steve and Renee	SAFE	SAFE	RISK	WIN	2ND	ELIM		
5	Randi and Jacob	SAFE	SAFE	SAFE	WIN	ELIM			
6	Joey and Mario	RISK	SAFE	2ND	ELIM				
7	Vanessa and Shanice	SAFE	RISK	ELIM					
8	Nina and Hannah	SAFE	ELIM						
9	Sierra and Edwin	ELIM							
