= Wizard Wars (TV series) =

Reality competition television series

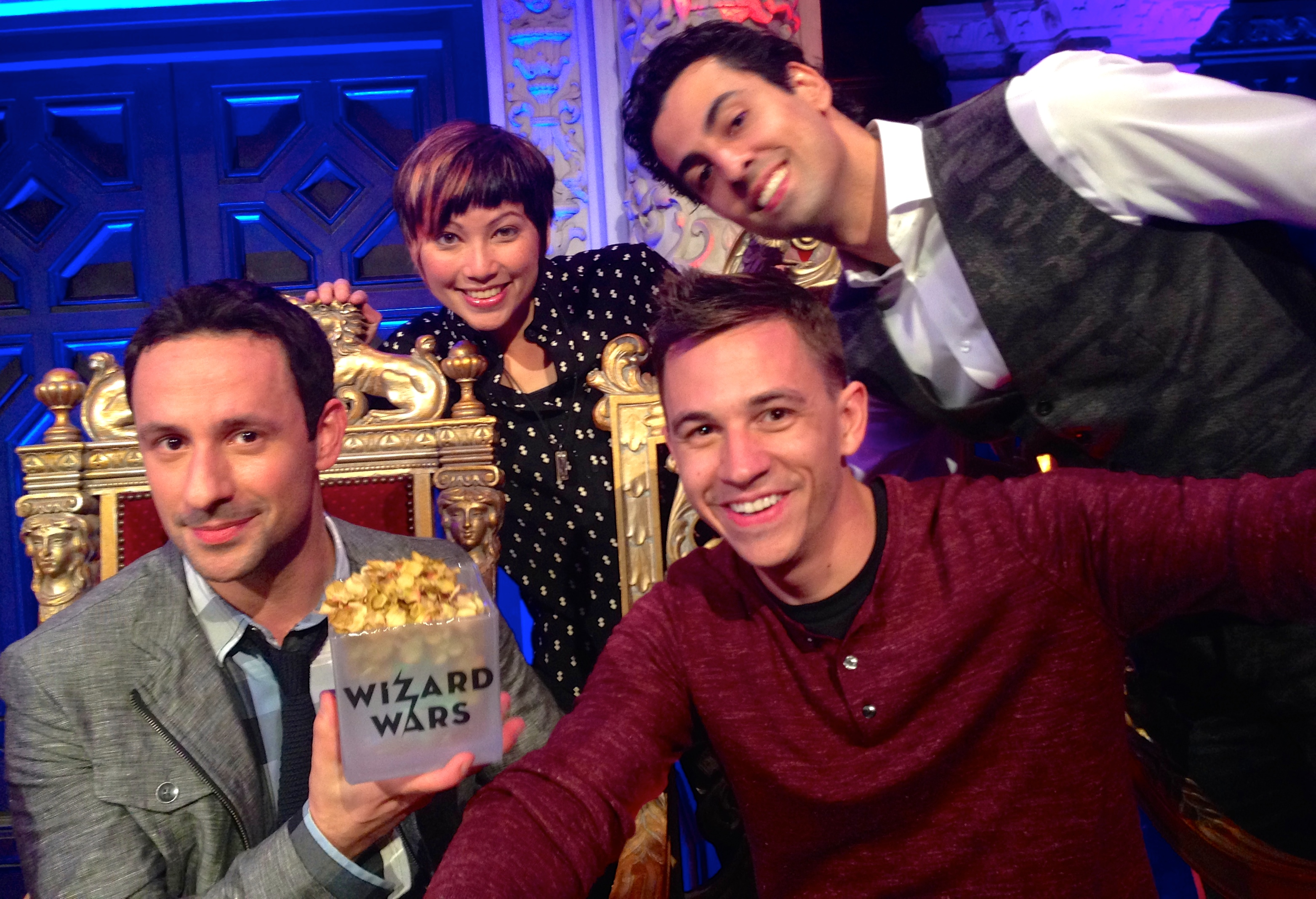
Season 1.5 "Wizards" Justin Flom, Shimshi, and Billy Kidd pictured with show creator Rick Lax

Wizard Wars is an American reality competition show in which teams of magicians create and perform original magic routines before a live studio audience. Their acts are judged on creativity, deception, and showmanship. Vegas headliners Penn & Teller head up the judging panel, alongside magic critic Christen Gerhart and World Champion of Magic Jason Latimer. Wizard Wars also features four "home team" magicians—the "Wizards"—who return every week to take on new teams of "challengers." Wizards include street magician Justin Flom, stage illusionist David Shimshi, mentalist Angela Funovits, and con man Gregory Wilson. The series premiered August 19, 2014.

Wizard Wars was created in 2012 by Vegas-based magic consultant Rick Lax and street magician Justin Flom. Flom filmed the original Wizard Wars pilot in Lax's apartment, on a $15 budget. The competing magicians created routines with placemats, beach balls, colored erasers and fake oranges. Flom's YouTube video, featured on Wired.com and BoingBoing.com, caught the eye of production company A. Smith & Co., who worked with Lax and Flom to sell the show to the Syfy network. Flom now stars in the show as a "Wizard"; Lax works behind the scene as a producer and magic consultant.

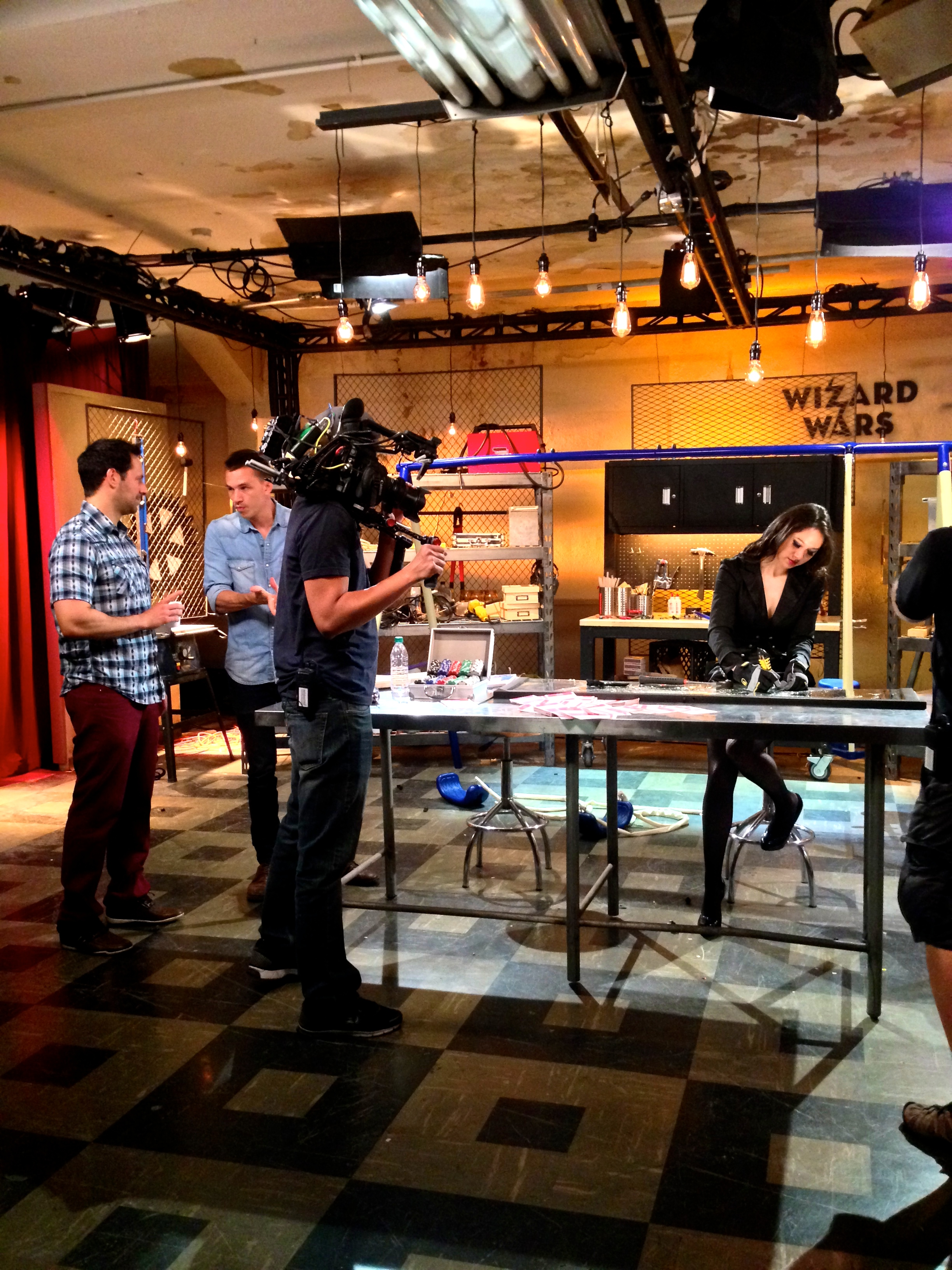
Season 1 Wizard Angela Funovits creating in the 'Magic Workshop.' Also pictured: Series creator Rick Lax (far left) and Wizard/series originator Justin Flom (middle).

Notable magicians appearing on Wizard Wars include Kyle Marlett, Las Vegas headliners, Murray SawChuck, Tommy Wind, Nathan Burton, Greg Dow and John Stessel, America's Got Talent's Leon Etienne, and Naathan Phan.

Over a million people watched the Wizard Wars series premiere. The episode highlighted Canadian illusionists Chris Funk and Ekaterina, who ended up losing the "Wizard War" to "Wizards" Gregory Wilson and Justin Flom.

Speaking on behalf of Flom and himself, Lax said this of the Internet-to-series premier journey: “The most unlikely part of the YouTube-video-to-Syfy-show transition was that the original Wizard Wars vision stayed in shape...Everyone told me, ‘Hollywood is going to tear your idea apart,’ but that didn't happen. Only thing that happened was the magic got bigger and better.”

Wizard Wars maintained "very solid ratings" and was renewed for another six episodes. In these six episodes ("Season 1.5") former Challenger Billy Kidd joins the cast as a full-fledged Wizard.

== Behind-The-Scenes ==
In August 2014 Wired (website) offered viewers a behind-the-scenes look at Season 1 of Wizard Wars.

== Episodes ==
No.	Title	Original release date
1	"Spam-tastic!"	August 19, 2014
A team of Canada's best illusionists take on two edgy young American magicians to see who can best enchant an audience with everyday objects, including Spam, Super Soakers and the occasional deck of cards.
2	"Puppy Love"	August 26, 2014
Doggy snacks and a live puppy become magical in the hands of two competing teams of illusionists.
3	"Rated Arrrgh!"	September 2, 2014
Competing teams make use of tarot cards, a rocking chair, sparklers, chess pieces and a pirate costume.
4	"Blown Away"	September 9, 2014
Two New Jersey street magicians take on the star of a British magic show and a world-renowned illusionist using a leaf blower. Who will win and get to enter the Wizard War?
5	"Battle Of The Vegas Strip"	September 16, 2014
Three of Vegas' best and a Texas charmer face off using household objects like garden gnomes and neckties to master-mind jaw-dropping magic routines and the chance to advance to the Wizard War!
6	"Birds Of A Feather"	September 23, 2014
Laughter-- and a few doves-- take center stage as teams of comedy magicians compete to see who moves on to face a team of Wizards armed with a confetti shooter!
7	"Fire and Mice"	January 29, 2015
Teams of magicians from Chicago and Las Vegas compete. Props include Tiki torches, a tennis racket and balls, and live mice.
8	"Silly Rabbits"	February 5, 2015
Pre-existing pairs of magicians test their years of chemistry against the Wizards in a battle that includes luggage, a cape and a white rabbit as props.
9	"Billy Bears All"	February 12, 2015
It's the U.S. vs. Canada battling it out for the chance to face the Wizards. Props include a giant teddy bear, a flying shark toy and footed pajamas.
10	"Mentalist Marvels"	February 26, 2015
Challengers from around the world battle it out using a down pillow, children's flash cards, and a dartboard with darts.
11	"Magic Carpet Ride"	March 5, 2015
In this 1970s themed episode, the contestants make magic fun using a guitar, jumbo-sized dominoes and a tutu.
12	"Walking on Water"	March 12, 2015
It's East Coast versus West Coast in this episode. It's creativity city with a pink lawn flamingo, a hula hoop, and a piggy bank filled with coins.
