= Stuart MacLeod (magician) =

Scottish magician (born circa 1980)

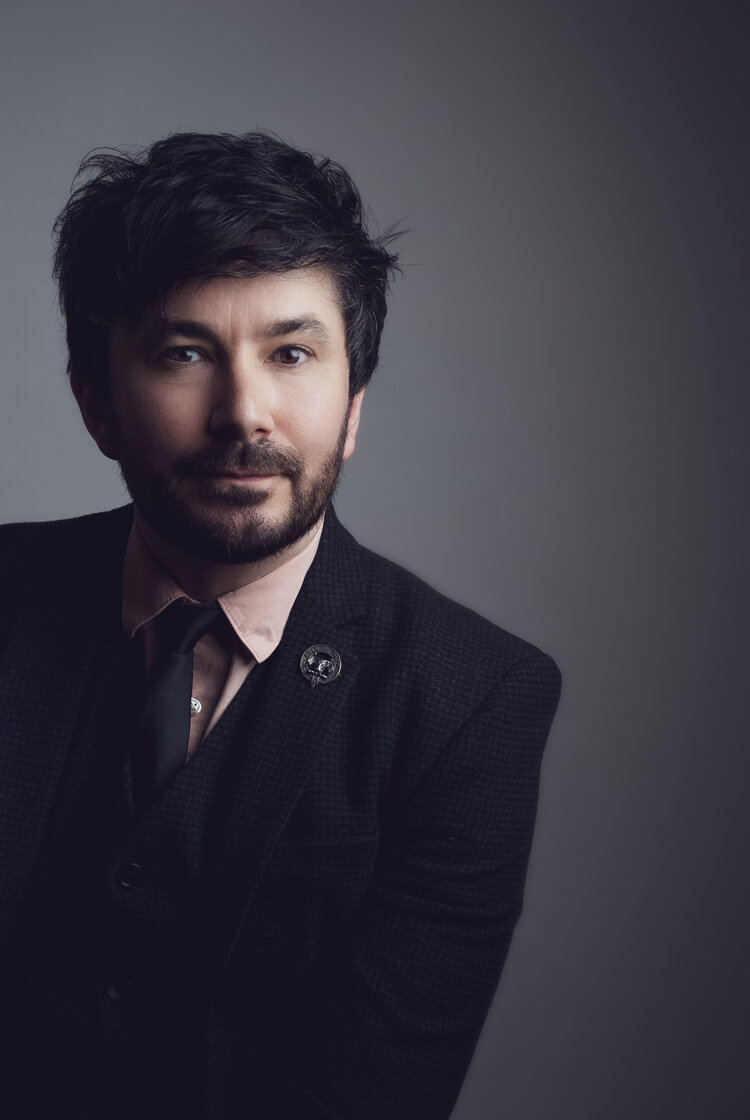
- Born: (born circa 1980); Peterhead, Scotland, U.K.
- Education: University of Aberdeen
- Occupations: Producer, writer, magician, comedian
- Years active: 2003 – present
- Spouse: Jenni Melear (m. 2014)
- Website: stuartmac.com

Stuart MacLeod is a Scottish-born professional magician, television producer, writer, comedian, and television personality.

He is known for co-producing Magic for Humans on Netflix, appearing on The Magicians, and working in the Scottish BAFTA–nominated duo Barry and Stuart. Stuart was also a judge representing Scotland on CBS's The World's Best.

== Early life ==
Stuart MacLeod was born in the town of Peterhead in Aberdeenshire, Scotland. He attended Peterhead Academy and then studied philosophy and psychology at Aberdeen University.

He took an interest in magic and magicians early in his life. In 1995 and 1996, Macleod was twice awarded "Young Magician of the Year" in Scotland.

== Barry and Stuart duo ==
Stuart MacLeod and Barry Jones first met at a club for magicians in Aberdeen in 1994–1995. They began as rivals and their contest reached its culmination at the Scottish Young Magician of the Year competition where Stuart and Barry both won main awards.

In 2002, MacLeod and Jones teamed up to form the magic duo Barry and Stuart. Soon they began making videos of magic on the streets. The duo was noticed by television production company Objective Productions, which resulted in their first television series Magick. Later, the show was nominated as Best Comedy Series at the Rose d'Or.

The duo became popular and MacLeod and Jones went on to make television series and specials, including Dirty Tricks, The Magic of Jesus, Tricks from the Bible, The Magicians and The Happenings (the latter was broadcast internationally on the National Geographic Channel). Their live theater shows include Part Time Warlocks (first performed at Edinburgh Festival Fringe), Powered by Demons (Edinburgh Festival Fringe and Soho Theatre, London)., Barry and Stuart: Live and more.

== Solo career ==
Since 2013, MacLeod has successfully pursued solo endeavors in television and cinematography while still performing as a magician both solo and in collaboration with other illusionists. In 2013, MacLeod served as a consulting producer for The incredible Mr. Goodwin: Dangerman (five episodes)

In 2015, he co-wrote (with Jenni Melear and Adrian Elizondo) and directed Funny Love, a silent short film which premiered at the Dances with Films film festival in Hollywood. In 2016, MacLeod performed in the television series The Next Great Magician, where illusionists competed against each other for the title of Next Great Magician.

In 2017, MacLeod was the executive producer of James Galea's Best Tricks Ever. He is co-executive producer of the Netflix series Magic for Humans, an American reality-television show featuring magician Justin Willman performing tricks on the street.

He also performed in live magic shows, including Band of Magicians (Las Vegas) and The Illusionists, Live from Broadway.

In 2018, Macleod was featured among other famous Scots who have moved to Hollywood as part of a comedy documentary Gary Goes to Hollywood which was broadcast on BBC Scotland on December 31, 2018. In 2019, MacLeod was on a panel of fifty experts from the entertainment industry (representing Scotland) in The World's Best, a reality talent competition television series hosted by James Corden with judges Drew Barrymore, Faith Hill, and Rupaul.

== Personal life ==
Stuart MacLeod married actress Jenni Melear in 2014. They live and work in Los Angeles.
