= Win, Lose or Draw (2014 game show) =

- Genre: Game show
- Created by: Burt Reynolds; Bert Convy
- Presented by: Justin Willman
- Country of origin: United States
- Original language: English
- No. of seasons: 1
- No. of episodes: 40

Production
- Executive producer: Jennifer Convy
- Running time: 22–24 minutes
- Production companies: Entertain the Brutes; ABC Media Group

Original release
- Network: Disney Channel
- Release: January 17 – May 21, 2014

Win, Lose or Draw (also known as Disney's Win, Lose or Draw) is a game show that aired as a preview on January 17, 2014, and officially premiered on March 3, 2014, on Disney Channel.

In April 2013, the Disney Channel announced a new version of Win, Lose or Draw, to be hosted by Justin Willman. As with Teen Win, Lose or Draw, the two teams on each program are made up of two young contestants plus a teenage celebrity (this time, from a Disney Channel or Disney XD program). New motion-control technology is featured. Jennifer Convy, daughter of original series co-creator Bert Convy, serves as the executive producer. It was not renewed for a second season.

== Challenges ==
The 2014 version featured the following rounds (all 90 seconds):

Get a Clue: For each word, two team members work on a drawing while the third guesses. The host announces a clue, leading to the answer, with additional clues provided and the two artists alternate working on a drawing every 10 seconds. Each right answer is worth 10 points, with team members alternating after each word is either guessed or passed.

Draw-Obstacle Course: The clue givers endure a variety of challenges while drawing, such as using an over-sized stylus, drawing on a spinning touch-screen board, the current drawing disappearing if the clue giver lifts his/her finger, or drawing while standing on a vibrating stool. The challenges rotate from episode to episode, and three are presented per round. As before, right answers are worth 10 points.

Fill in the Blank: Adapted from the original final round, Willman reads a pun-styled clue with a blank, with the clue-giver drawing the word that filled in the blank. As in all previous versions, the team that was trailing goes first (or the team that went first in round one going first if the score was tied), and clues are worth 20 points, with as many clues played as possible within the time limit.

Prize Round: The winning contestants paired up with both of the day's guest stars to win up to four prizes. Four words or phrases were played, each right guess earning a prize which the contestants picked out from four boxes on stage. Three different bonus round games were played:

- The Wand: Most frequently played, each artist faces away from the video wall and drew a picture in the air, using a hand-held wand, which is transmitted to the video wall for their teammates to guess. If an artist turns around to look at the wall, they are disqualified.
- Follow Your Art: Similar to the "Get a Clue" round, the artist starts drawing on one screen and every five seconds the drawing will "swoop" to one of the other two screens.
- Sit & Spin: The artist sits in a rotating chair and try to draw the word/phrase while the chair rotates, without standing up.

== Episodes ==
No.	Title	Original release date	US viewers (millions)
1	"Leo Howard & Olivia Holt"	January 17, 2014	2.80
2	"Peyton List & Cameron Boyce"	March 3, 2014	2.07
3	"Dove Cameron & Joey Bragg"	March 4, 2014	1.70
4	"Laura Marano & Raini Rodriguez"	March 5, 2014	1.50
5	"G. Hannelius & Blake Michael"	March 6, 2014	1.39
6	"Garrett Clayton & Chrissie Fit"	March 10, 2014	0.98
7	"Tyrel Jackson Williams & Billy Unger"	March 11, 2014	1.22
8	"Bradley Steven Perry & Jake Short"	March 12, 2014	1.25
9	"Olivia Holt & Leo Howard"	March 13, 2014	1.39
10	"Dove Cameron & Joey Bragg"	March 17, 2014	1.50
11	"G. Hannelius & Blake Michael"	March 18, 2014	1.02
12	"Peyton List & Cameron Boyce"	March 19, 2014	1.21
13	"Tyrel Jackson Williams & Billy Unger"	March 20, 2014	1.22
14	"Laura Marano & Raini Rodriguez"	March 24, 2014	1.26
15	"Bradley Steven Perry & Jake Short"	March 25, 2014	1.13
16	"Olivia Holt & Leo Howard"	March 26, 2014	1.21
17	"Garrett Clayton & Chrissie Fit"	March 27, 2014	1.30
18	"G. Hannelius & Blake Michael"	April 7, 2014	1.26
19	"Tyrel Jackson Williams & Billy Unger"	April 8, 2014	1.13
20	"Dove Cameron & Joey Bragg"	April 9, 2014	1.16
21	"Garrett Clayton & Chrissie Fit"	April 10, 2014	1.16
22	"Bradley Steven Perry & Jake Short"	April 14, 2014	N/A
23	"Peyton List & Cameron Boyce"	April 15, 2014	N/A
24	"Laura Marano & Raini Rodriguez"	April 16, 2014	N/A
25	"Leo Howard & Olivia Holt"	April 17, 2014	N/A
26	"Tyrel Jackson Williams & Billy Unger"	April 21, 2014	1.12
27	"G. Hannelius & Blake Michael"	April 22, 2014	1.13
28	"Garrett Clayton & Chrissie Fit"	April 23, 2014	0.99
29	"Bradley Steven Perry & Jake Short"	April 24, 2014	0.85
30	"Leo Howard & Olivia Holt"	April 28, 2014	0.96
31	"Laura Marano & Raini Rodriguez"	April 29, 2014	1.15
32	"Peyton List & Cameron Boyce"	April 30, 2014	0.80
33	"Tyrel Jackson Williams & Billy Unger"	May 1, 2014	0.93
34	"Laura Marano & Raini Rodriguez"	May 12, 2014	N/A
35	"Peyton List & Cameron Boyce"	May 13, 2014	N/A
36	"G. Hannelius & Blake Michael"	May 14, 2014	N/A
37	"Dove Cameron & Joey Bragg"	May 15, 2014	N/A
38	"Bradley Steven Perry & Jake Short"	May 19, 2014	N/A
39	"Garrett Clayton & Chrissie Fit"	May 20, 2014	N/A
40	"Dove Cameron & Joey Bragg"	May 21, 2014	N/A

== Broadcast ==
The series originally aired as a preview on January 17, 2014, and officially premiered on March 3, 2014, on Disney Channel. Family Channel premiered it on April 7, 2014, and Disney Channel (UK and Ireland) premiered on May 5, 2014. Eventually it premiered on May 30, 2014, on Disney Channel (Asia) and on June 2, 2014, on Disney Channel (Australia and New Zealand). In late June 2014, the series premiered on Disney Channel (Europe, Middle East and Africa).
