= Joanne Chang =

American chef and restaurant owner

- Born: Joanne Chang; 1971 (age 54–55); Houston, Texas, U.S
- Education: Harvard University (AB)
- Occupations: Chef, restaurateur
- Spouse: Christopher Myers (m. 2007)
- Culinary career
- Cooking style: Chinese, pastry
- Current restaurant(s): Flour Bakery Myers + Chang
- Award(s) won: James Beard Award 2016 Outstanding Baker

Joanne Chang (born in Houston, Texas) is an American chef and restaurateur. She is the owner of Flour Bakery in Boston and Cambridge, Massachusetts and is a James Beard Foundation Award winner for Outstanding Baker, 2016.

== Early life and education ==
Chang's parents were immigrants who met while studying in Houston. She was born in Houston circa 1971. As a child, she grew up in Oklahoma and Texas and enjoyed cooking and baking. After graduating as valedictorian of her high school class, Chang attended Harvard University, where she studied astrophysics before switching to applied mathematics. She graduated with a bachelor's degree in applied mathematics and economics in 1991.

== Career ==
After graduation, Chang worked as a management consultant at the Monitor Group in Cambridge. While working at the company, she created a business plan for a company called Joanne's Kitchen and prepared cakes and cookies for her co-workers. After two years as a consultant, Chang realized that consulting was not the best career for her. She applied for work as a chef, despite having limited culinary experience.

Chang began her professional cooking career as a garde-manger cook at Boston's Biba restaurant, followed by stints as the pastry cook at Bentonwood Bakery in Newton, and in 1995, the pastry chef at Rialto restaurant in Cambridge. In 1997, she began working at the cake department of Payard Patisserie in New York City. Chang stated she worked from "4 a.m. to midnight, six days a week". Returning to Boston a year later with plans to open a pastry shop, she worked as a pastry chef at Mistral until the summer of 2000. In 2007 she won an episode of Beat Bobby Flay with her recipe for sticky buns. In 2021 she was a judge on Baking Impossible, a cooking competition show on Netflix.

She has taught cooking classes. She contributed to the cookbook Rebel Girls Make Dessert (2025).

== Restaurants ==
Chang opened her first Flour Bakery in Boston's South End in 2000. As of November 2025 the company has 9 locations in Boston and Cambridge, Massachusetts.

In 2007, Chang and her husband, Christopher Myers, opened Myers + Chang, an Asian fusion restaurant in Boston's South End.

== Recognition ==
Chang was the James Beard Foundation 2016 Outstanding Baker. She had been a finalist for an award in five previous years.

== Cookbooks ==
- Flour: Spectacular Recipes from Boston's Flour Bakery + Cafe (2010)
- Flour Too: Indispensable Recipes for the Café's Most Loved Sweets & Savories (2013)
- Baking with Less Sugar: Recipes for Dessert using Natural Sweeteners and Little-to-No White Sugar (2015)
- Myers+Chang at Home (2017)
- Pastry Love: A Baker's Journal of Favorite Recipes (2019)

== Personal life ==
Chang met her husband Christopher Myers in 1995 while they worked together at Rialto. The couple married in 2007.
