= Justin Flom =

American magician (born 1986)

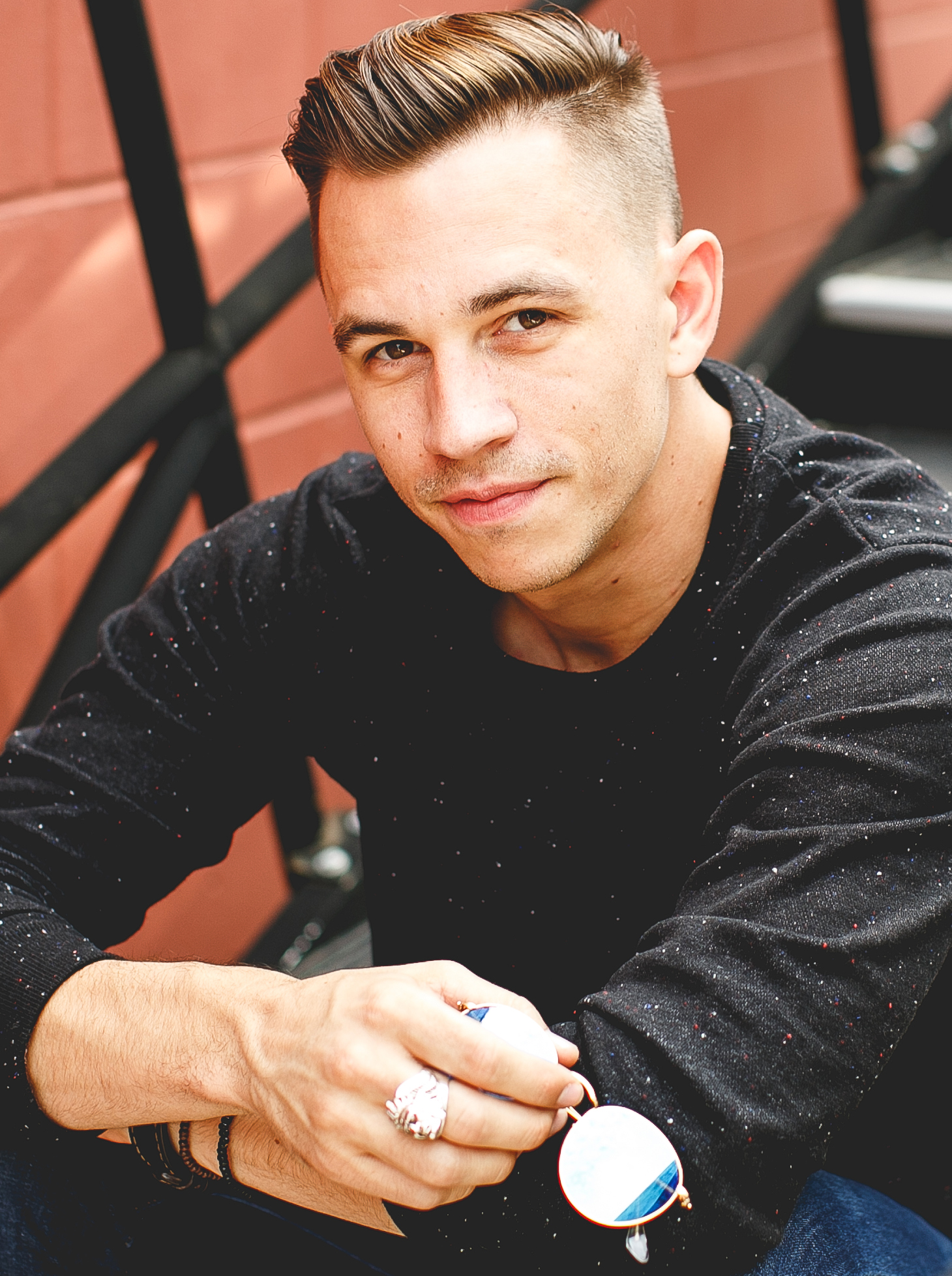
- Flom in 2022
- Born: April 29, 1986 (age 40); Edina, Minnesota, U.S.
- Years active: 2005–present
- Agent: CAA
- Known for: Wizard Wars
- Spouses: Jocelynn Flom (m. 2009; div. 2021); Anna Rothfuss (m. 2023)

TikTok information
- Page: justinflom
- Followers: 10.4 million

YouTube information
- Channel: Justin Flom
- Genres: Magic, entertainment
- Subscribers: 33.7 million
- Views: 36.88 billion
- Last updated: 07/02/2026
- Website: justinflom.com

Justin Flom (born April 29, 1986) is an American YouTuber, social media personality, and illusionist. He gained recognition through his YouTube series along with his television show Wizard Wars in which he performs magic using everyday objects. Flom has also performed live, both independently and as an opening act for musical groups. He has been a part of notable projects such as the Band of Magicians.

During the COVID-19 pandemic, he expanded his reach on social media, particularly Facebook and YouTube, where his videos garnered millions of views. Known for his controversial support of magic exposure, Flom often reveals the secrets behind magic tricks.

== Early life ==
Born in Edina, Minnesota, Flom was raised in a family of magicians (his father and uncle were practicing magicians). He has two brothers and a sister. Flom started doing magic at an early age with his siblings. He was homeschooled.

== Career ==
=== Branson, Missouri, 2005–2009 ===
In 2005, Flom decided to forego college to pursue a career in magic, launching his show at The Branson Mall Music Theatre in Branson, Missouri He became the youngest featured performer in the area. In 2006, he established The Imaginary Theatre and Magic Parlor above the Majestic Steak House, opening its doors on July 1. By 2011, Flom shifted his focus towards creating online magic videos and developing new tricks to share through digital platforms.

=== YouTube, 2012–2013 ===
In 2012, Flom produced Magic Block Party, a street magic event that features a variety of magical performances and illusions for local communities. The event was filmed in Eden Prairie during the summer of 2012. Magic Block Party gained attention, including that of Ellen DeGeneres, who invited Flom to appear on The Ellen DeGeneres Show in 2013. He then became a regular guest on her show. Flom was once named Best Up and Coming Entertainer by Las Vegas Weekly.

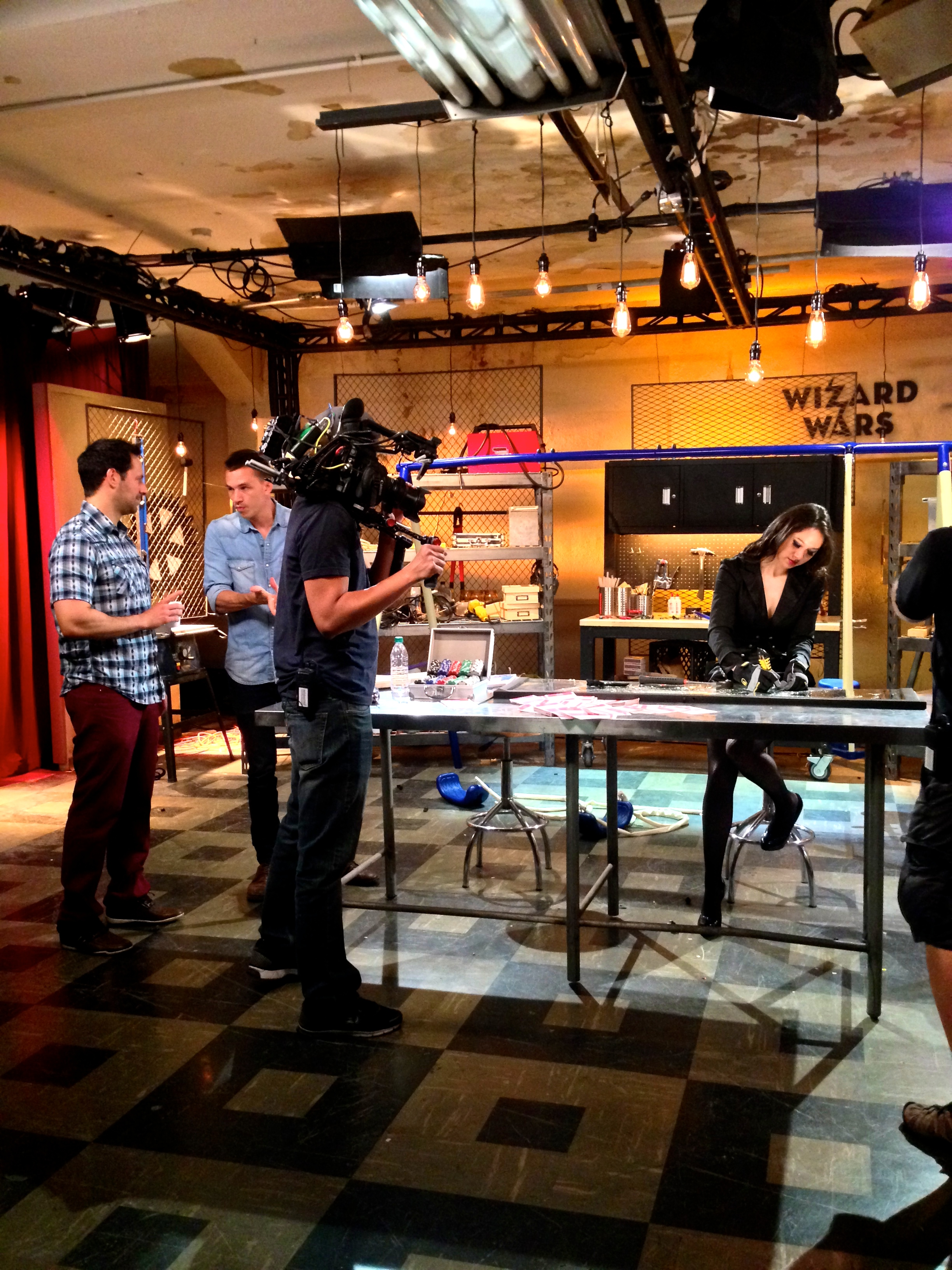
Creators of Wizard Wars Rick Lax and Justin Flom with fellow Wizard Angela Funovits on set.

=== 2014 ===
In 2014, Australian magician James Galea formed the Band of Magicians with Flom, Justin Willman, and Nate Staniforth. The group performed collaborative illusions that required the combined skills of multiple magicians, debuting at the Sydney Festival 2014.

In 2014, Syfy Television network produced a new show titled Wizard Wars, featuring Flom, Penn and Teller, and several other magicians competing to create magic out of ordinary objects on the spot. Flom also served as an associate producer of the show, which was based on an idea by Rick Lax from Flom's YouTube channel. Flom held the position of lead wizard on the series. The premiere of Wizard Wars attracted over a million viewers.

=== 2015–2017 ===
In January 2015, Flom participated in a WWE storyline on Smackdown where he performed magic for the superstars backstage and smashed an egg on the face of The Miz, contributing to the ongoing conflict between the Miz and Mizdow (also known as Damien Sandow). This appearance was part of a promotion for the new season of Wizard Wars, which aired immediately following that episode of SmackDown.

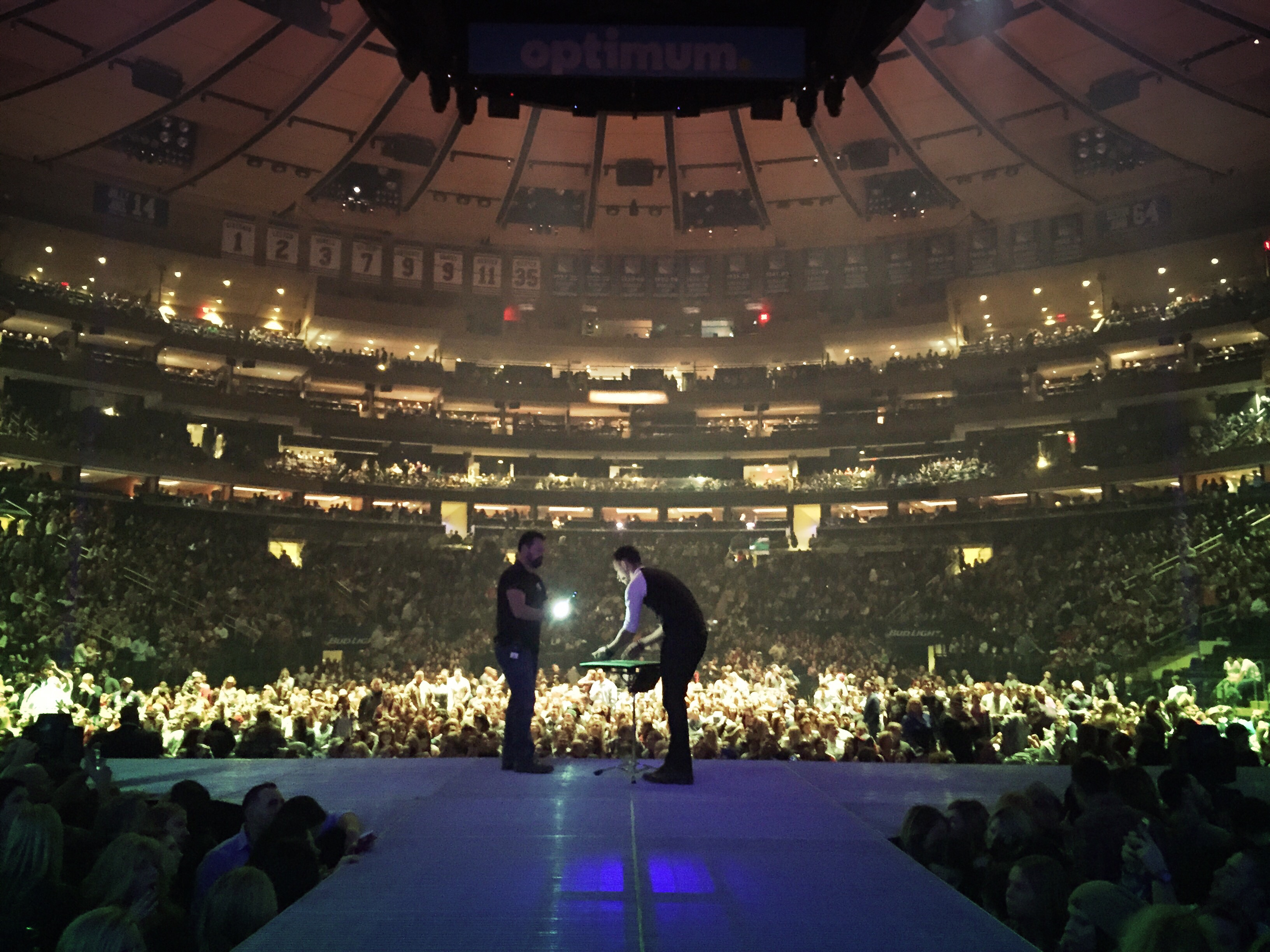
Justin Flom, the first magician to perform close up magic at Madison Square Garden in New York City.

Also in 2015, Flom performed as the opening act for the country music group Florida Georgia Line during their arena tour. The following year, he featured in a commercial for Coca-Cola, performing for the company's One Brand ad campaign.

Throughout much of his career, Flom dedicated significant time to creating content for YouTube and Snapchat, while also performing live magic across the United States. His wife at the time, Jocelynn Flom, filmed all the videos, and Flom handled the editing of the footage.

=== 2018 ===
In early 2018, Flom released the video Sawing a Baby in Half, where he performed the classic sawing a lady in half illusion with his 4-month-old daughter. This trick, along with various other magic effects, collectively exceeded 100 million views.

=== 2019 ===
Flom was a contestant on The World's Best where he advanced to the champion rounds.

=== 2020s ===
During the worldwide pandemic, Flom began creating Facebook videos full-time. His content gained popularity, making his page one of the top 5 U.S. Facebook pages with the highest reach. In 2020 alone, his content garnered 6.4 billion minutes of viewing time on Facebook's platform. In January and February 2022, Flom's page was among the most-viewed pages in Facebook.

As a magician, Flom often exposes long-guarded trade secrets of magic tricks. Criticism was leveled at Flom by other magicians, and he was barred from several magic organizations.

Between 2020 and 2023, Flom produced more than 2,000 videos. He incorporated distinctive features into his Las Vegas home, which frequently appear in his social media videos such as secret passageways, a foam pit room, trap doors, floating furniture, among others. In 2023, he uploaded a video on TikTok that became the second most viewed on the platform worldwide for the year. The video featured Flom painting Iron Man on a ceiling and garnered 418 million views within the year.

In June 2024, a video that Flom had made in 2022 where his wife Anna did a quick-change trick with three dresses became the most viewed video on YouTube Shorts. His other videos have also found success on that platform.

== Social media content ==
=== Soldier's Deck of Cards ===
In the Soldier's Deck of Cards video, Justin Flom narrates a story about a soldier during World War II who uses a deck of cards which acts as his bible, calendar, and almanac. Using card manipulation, he paid tribute to American war veterans. Flom's YouTube production went viral and contributed to his rise in popularity, earning him an appearance on The Ellen DeGeneres Show.

=== Anna's Quick Change Trick ===
In this video, Flom and his wife Anna collaborate on a quick change trick, where Anna changes outfits multiple times in a matter of seconds. The seamless and rapid costume changes, combined with Justin's presentation, created an entertaining performance that became the most viewed YouTube Shorts video.

=== Iron Man ceiling ===
In the Iron Man Ceiling video, Flom steps away from his usual magic tricks, using technology and art to redecorate his home. Using spray paint and stencils, he transforms a plain ceiling into an Iron Man-themed installation. His post became the second most viewed TikTok video for the year 2023.

== Personal life ==
In 2009, Flom married Jocelynn Sharp, and the couple moved to Las Vegas to collaborate with popular magic creators. They separated in the spring of 2021. In 2023, Flom married Anna Rothfuss.

Flom has two daughters.
