= Justin Willman =

American magician, comedian, television producer

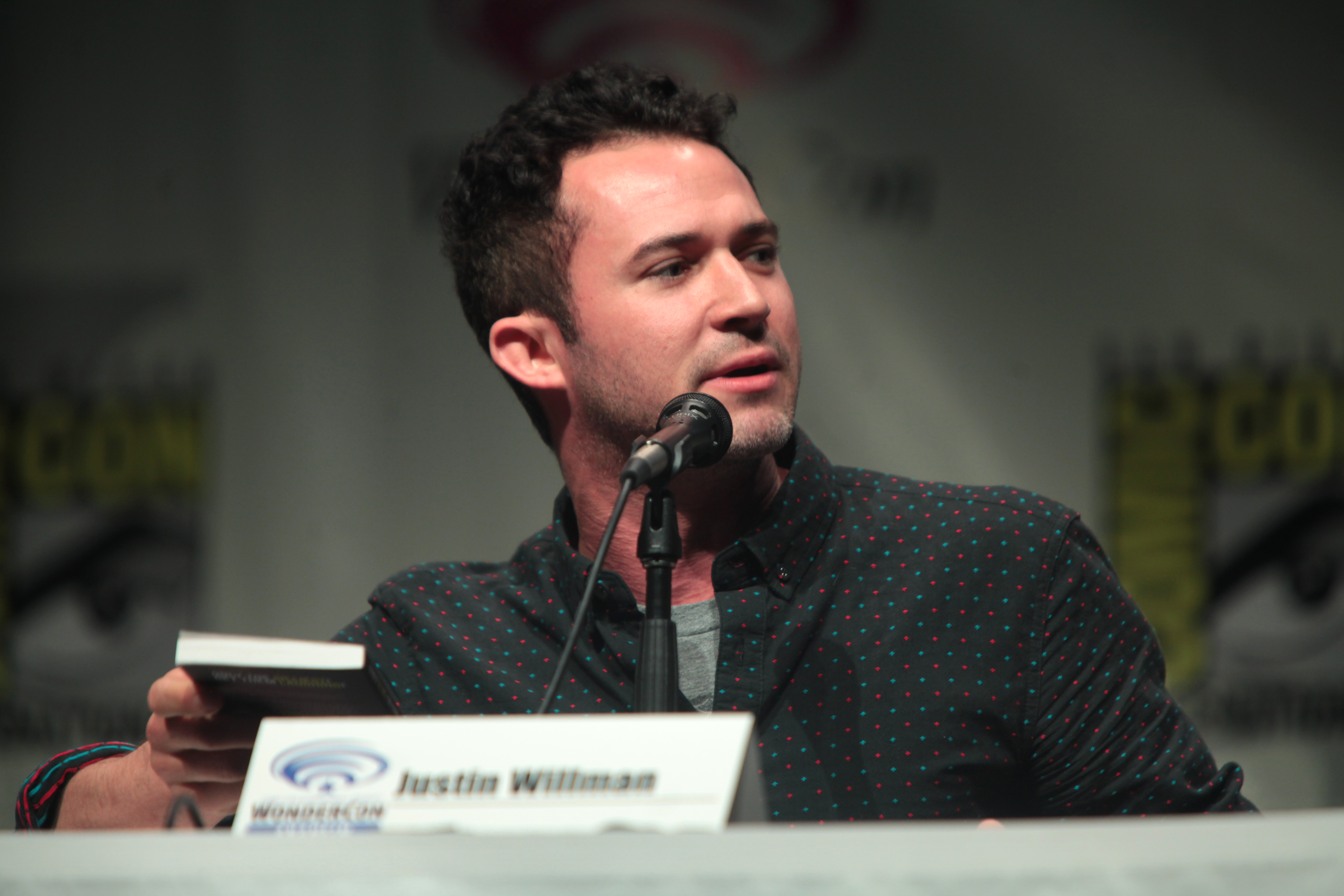
- Willman speaking at the 2015 Wondercon, for "Nerdist", at the Anaheim Convention Center in Anaheim, California
- Born: July 11, 1980 (age 46); St. Louis, Missouri, U.S.
- Other name: Justin Kredible
- Education: Emerson College
- Occupations: Magician, comedian, producer, television personality
- Organization: MagicAid
- Spouse: Jillian Sipkins (m. 2015)
- Children: 2

Justin Willman (born July 11, 1980) is an American magician, comedian, producer, and television personality. He is the creator and star of Magic for Humans on Netflix. The third season of Magic for Humans was released on May 15, 2020. He has made regular appearances on The Tonight Show, The Ellen DeGeneres Show, and Conan. His debut comedy/magic special Sleight of Mouth premiered on Comedy Central in 2015. He has hosted the shows Cupcake Wars, Halloween Wars, King of Cones on the Food Network, Disney's Win, Lose or Draw on Disney Channel, along with Baking Impossible and The Magic Prank Show with Justin Willman on Netflix.

== Personal life ==
Born in St. Louis, Missouri, Justin Willman began entertaining at the age of 12, after breaking both of his arms. His orthopedic surgeon recommended he learn card tricks as an alternative to occupational therapy and to get the dexterity back in his hands. Soon he was performing for friends and family then eventually at birthday parties under the stage name "Justin Kredible" (a play on the words just incredible), a name given to him by his mother. He has since dropped the stage name, using his given name Justin Willman in all of his professional work.

Willman graduated from Ladue Horton Watkins High School in St. Louis, then graduated from Emerson College in Boston, where he majored in broadcast journalism. He was raised Catholic.

Willman resides in Los Angeles with his wife Jillian Sipkins, son Jackson Willman, and daughter Rosie Willman.

== Career ==
Willman has performed his magic on "Magic Meltdown" on YouTube, which became a webseries for the Nerdist Channel and incorporated some of the tricks from his magic tours. In Magic Meltdown, Willman performed tricks based on a chosen topic such as technology, children, and food.

In 2011, he performed for the first family for the White House Halloween party. In 2014, James Galea called on Willman, along with Justin Flom and Nate Staniforth, to form Band of Magicians.

=== TV host ===
From 2009 to 2013, Willman hosted Cupcake Wars on Food Network. He also hosted Halloween Wars and Last Cake Standing on Food Network, as well as the variety show Hubworld and the game show Scrabble Showdown on the Hub Network.

Willman began hosting Win, Lose or Draw on Disney Channel, a revival of the teen version of the Burt Reynolds and Bert Convy classic game show in 2014. In July, Comedy Central ordered a pilot for Sleight of Mouth, a weekly magic-based variety show hosted by Willman. The show was not picked up, but Comedy Central aired the pilot in April 2015 as a special.

Willman is the host and executive producer of the show Magic for Humans which was released on Netflix on August 17, 2018. Season 2 of Magic for Humans premiered on December 4, 2019 and the third on May 15, 2020.

Willman appeared as a guest judge on season 1 of Netflix's Nailed It! Holiday! and season 3 of Sugar Rush.

Willman hosts the 2021 Netflix show Baking Impossible, a show about competing bakers and engineers making incredible baking structures.

Willman is the host and executive producer of the 2024 Netflix show The Magic Prank Show with Justin Willman, a show about magic pranks.

=== Acting ===
In 2003, Willman had a brief role as a teacher’s assistant on the WB show Gilmore Girls: Season 4 Episode 3 "The Hobbit, the Sofa and Digger Stiles.”

Willman has guest starred on the CBS show Defenders, and made a cameo on the Disney sitcom The Suite Life on Deck where he played Armando.

In 2014, he appeared in a short called All's Fair, directed by Todd Strauss-Schulson.

In 2020, Willman had a cameo in the film Magic Camp, for which he also served as the magic consultant.

== Philanthropy ==
Willman is the magic director and serves on the board of directors for the nonprofit organization MagicAid, a 501(c)(3) based out of New York.
