= Renaissance School of Medicine at Stony Brook University =

Public medical school in Stony Brook, New York, US

Coordinates: 40.909544°N 73.115964°W

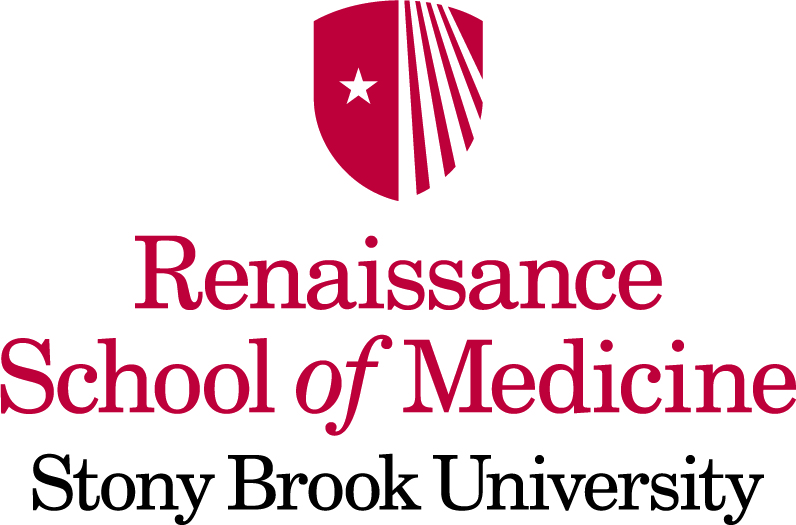
- Type: Public
- Established: 1971
- Parent institution: Stony Brook University
- Dean: Dr. Peter Igarashi
- Academic staff: 904
- Students: 564
- Location: Stony Brook, New York, United States
- Website: renaissance.stonybrookmedicine.edu
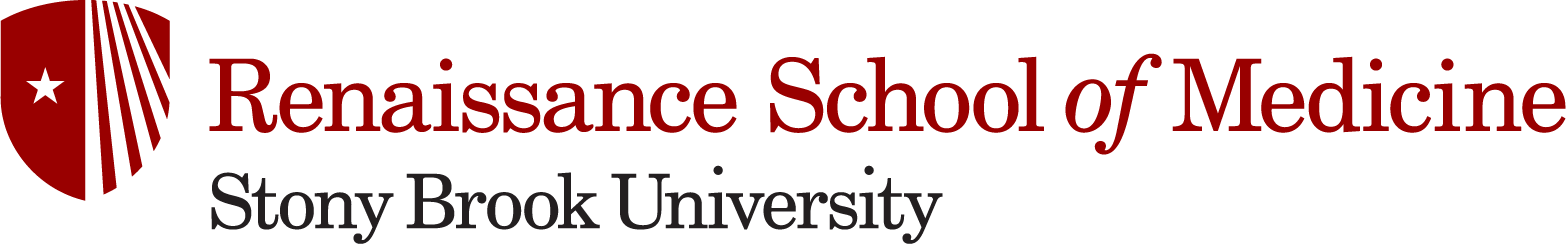

The Renaissance School of Medicine (RSOM) is the graduate medical school of Stony Brook University, located in the hamlet of Stony Brook, New York on Long Island. Founded in 1971, RSOM is one of the five health sciences schools under the Stony Brook Medicine healthcare system.

RSOM conducts $90 million in funded medical research annually, with NIH awards to RSOM faculty and research centers exceeding $42 million. Stony Brook University Hospital, RSOM's main clinical training site, is ranked the No. 10 best hospital in New York State.

== History ==
In 1963, Governor Nelson Rockefeller commissioned the report “Education of Health Professions,” also known as the Muir Report. This document recommended the creation of a Health Sciences Center and an academic hospital to serve the need of the fastest growing counties in New York at the time, Nassau and Suffolk.

In response to the Muir Report, an objective was set to build an academic medical center to lure established doctors to Long Island and to train new physicians. In 1965, planning for the new medical center began under the leadership of Dr. Edmund D. Pellegrino. In 1968, Dr. Pellegrino and Dr. Alfred Knudson, the school's first appointed Professor of Medicine, presented a vision for a "revolutionary approach" towards medical education, including a compressed three-year clinical training period, early direct patient contact, and encouragement of specialization. The Stony Brook University School of Medicine opened on August 10, 1971. Pellegrino was appointed the first Dean of Medicine. The inaugural class of 17 medical doctors graduated in 1974.

During the early years of the School of Medicine, the Northport Veteran Affairs Medical Center was used as the primary clinical site. Clinical training was shifted over to Stony Brook University Hospital after it opened in 1980. The School of Medicine expanded rapidly in the ensuing years to encompass an educational consortium of hospitals, including the Northport VA Medical Center, Nassau County Medical Center, Long Island Jewish Hospital, Queens Hospital, and Nassau Hospital, as well as establishing the Department of Surgery under Harry S. Soroff and Clarence Dennis.

Starting in 2013, the RSOM campus underwent a $423 million expansion project. In November 2018, the Medical and Research Translation (MART) building, an eight-story research center, opened with medical education/classroom spaces and the Stony Brook Cancer Center. The expansion project was completed the following year with the opening of the Stony Brook Children's Hospital and a new 150-bed Hospital Pavilion.

MagicAid, a non-profit organization, was founded by medical students at the school in 2016.

Stony Brook University School of Medicine was renamed the Renaissance School of Medicine at Stony Brook University in 2018. This was done to acknowledge over $500 million in donations from employees of Renaissance Technologies — a hedge fund located 2 miles from the Stony Brook University campus — with $150 million being pledged by Jim and Marilyn Simons, and the Simons Foundation. The name change acknowledges not only the namesake of Simons' hedge fund, Renaissance Technologies, but also the "renaissance" in biomedical research and innovation that the donations have fueled. The donations have helped create 9 academic and research centers, endowed 34 chairs and professorships, and funded $35 million in scholarships and fellowships.

== About ==
RSOM consists of 8 basic science and 18 clinical departments. RSOM is involved in the preclinical and clinical education of students in the five health sciences schools, the students of public health, and students across other schools in the university. RSOM provides graduate, post-graduate, and continuing education degrees.

RSOM offers dual degrees in conjunction with other schools at Stony Brook University. Applicants may apply to the NIH-funded MD-PhD Medical Scientist Training Program. Additionally, various dual degrees options may be pursued including an MD-MPH in conjunction with the School of Public Health, an MD-MBA in conjunction with the College of Business, and an MD-MA in conjunction with the Center for Bioethics, Compassionate Care and Medical Humanities.

== Curriculum ==
RSOM has recently redesigned its curriculum, which has been renamed the LEARN (Learning, Experiential, Adaptive, Rigorous, and Novel) Curriculum. The curriculum is composed of three phases: (Foundational) Phase I, (Primary Clinical) Phase II, and (Advanced Clinical) Phase III. Phase I, which takes place over 18 months, begins with the 24-week "B3" course, which concerns anatomy, the molecular foundations of medicine, and mechanisms of disease. The following 36 weeks are a sequence of five integrated pathophysiology systems-based courses. Phase II, which is 12 months, marks the start of clinical clerkships, including pediatrics and ob-gyn, surgery, anesthesia, and emergency medicine; and psychiatry, neurology, and radiology. Finally, Phase III, totaling 16 months, includes a combination of sub-internships in medicine, pediatrics, surgery, emergency medicine, ob/gyn, or urology, advanced clinical experiences, transition to residency courses, selectives, and electives. Students are given a 12-week period between phases II and III to study and sit for the USMLE Step 1 Exam and USMLE Step 2 Exam.

In addition to the LEARN Curriculum, RSOM offers a Scholarly Concentrations Program, which allows students to explore one of four academic concentrations, including Basic, Translational, Clinical and Social Sciences Research; Global Health; Medical Education; and Medical Humanities and Ethics.

Accepted students who are already certain of the medical speciality they would like to pursue are invited to apply to the 3-Year MD (3YMD@RSOM) Program. Depending on the specialty, between zero and two students from each incoming class are accepted to each specialty. The program saves students a year of schooling, as the curriculum is reduced from 149 weeks to 135 weeks. Students accepted into this program are given conditional acceptance to a RSOM residency program of their choice.

RSOM also offers dual degree programs in affiliation with other Stony Brook University graduate schools and outside research institutions. Among them are the MD/MBA program in conjunction with the College of Business at Stony Brook University and the MD/PhD program in conjunction with Cold Spring Harbor Laboratory and Brookhaven National Laboratory.

== Affiliated teaching hospitals and research institutes ==
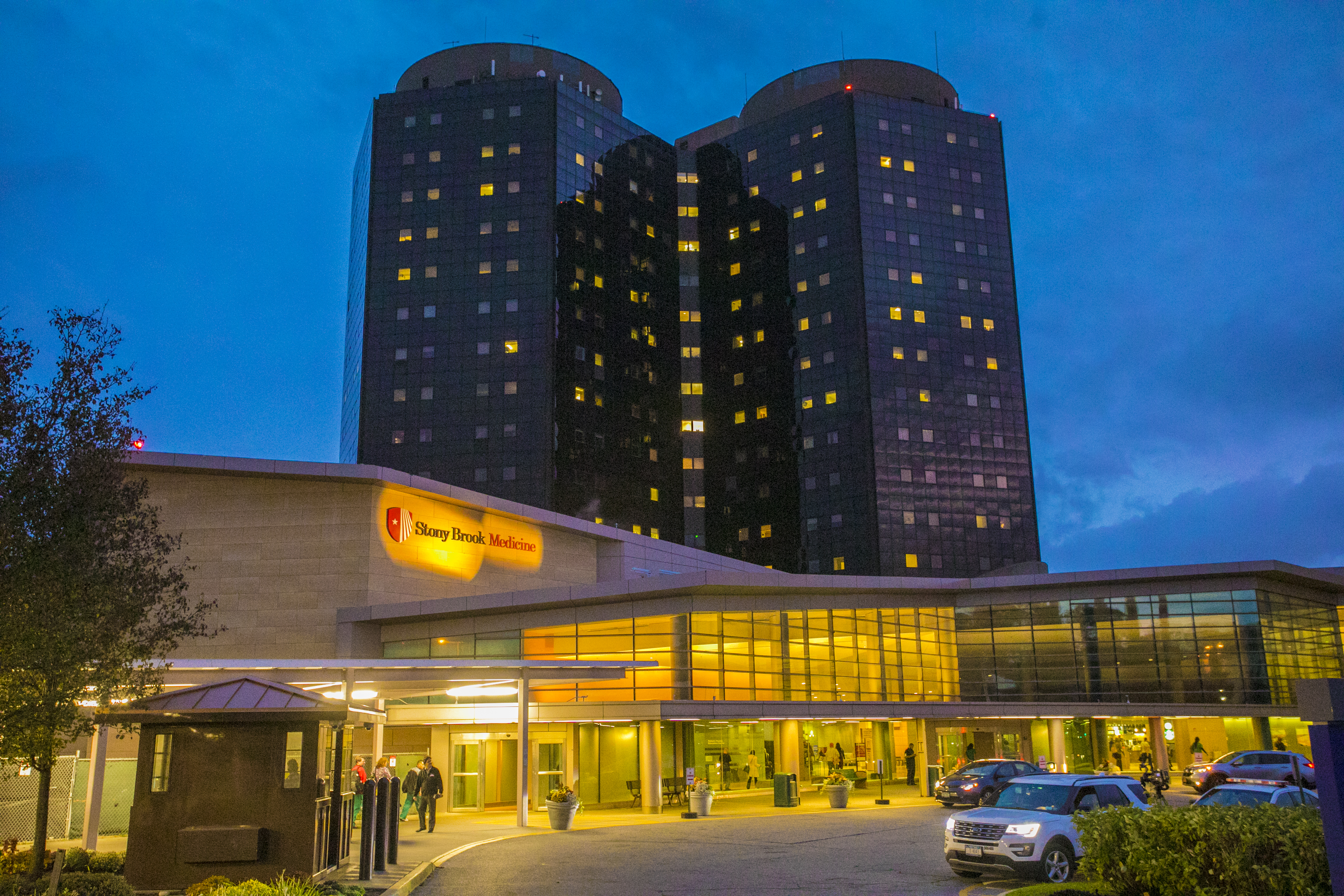
Stony Brook University Hospital is RSOM's primary teaching hospital

Residents and fellows of RSOM train at 6 sites on Long Island:

1. Stony Brook University Hospital
2. Nassau University Medical Center
3. Northport Veterans Affairs Medical Center
4. Stony Brook Southampton Hospital
5. Mount Sinai South Nassau
6. Eastern Long Island Hospital

Additionally, RSOM offers its students international rotations for residents in the Departments of Medicine, OB/GYN, Pediatrics, Anesthesiology, and Emergency Medicine at various partner sites, including Chile, China, Ecuador, Japan, Madagascar, Peru, Rwanda, and Uganda.

In 2016, RSOM entered into a strategic partnership with the Mount Sinai Health System and the Icahn School of Medicine in Manhattan to increase collaboration in medical education, biomedical research, and delivery of care.

== Research ==
RSOM ranks in the top 10 U.S. medical schools for NIH research funding in several disciplines, including anesthesiology and biomedical engineering. Over $90 million in research is funded annually at RSOM.

Researchers at RSOM have contributed to major medical innovations including:

- Nuclear MRI scanners, including the world's first MRI image by Paul Lauterbur (awarded the Nobel Prize in Physiology or Medicine).
- PET scan technology
- 3D virtual colonoscopy, by Arie Kaufman
- Discovery of etiology of Lyme disease, by Jorge Benach

Drugs that were developed by faculty of RSOM include:

- Abciximab (for cardiac angioplasty), by Barry S. Coller
- Doxycycline (for periodontal disease)
- Collagenase clostridium histolyticum (for Dupuytren's disease)

== Selectivity and ranking ==
In 2019, RSOM received over 4,800 applications for 136 seats. The incoming class had an average GPA of 3.84 and MCAT score of 516, which is the 93rd percentile nationally. In New York, it is the top ranked public medical school. Nationally, it is ranked 53rd in Research by U.S. News & World Report. The school has a 98% pass rate on the United States Medical Licensing Examination (USMLE) Step 1. Among graduates, one in four have matched to a top 20 medical residency program.
