= Joel Ward (magician) =

American magician

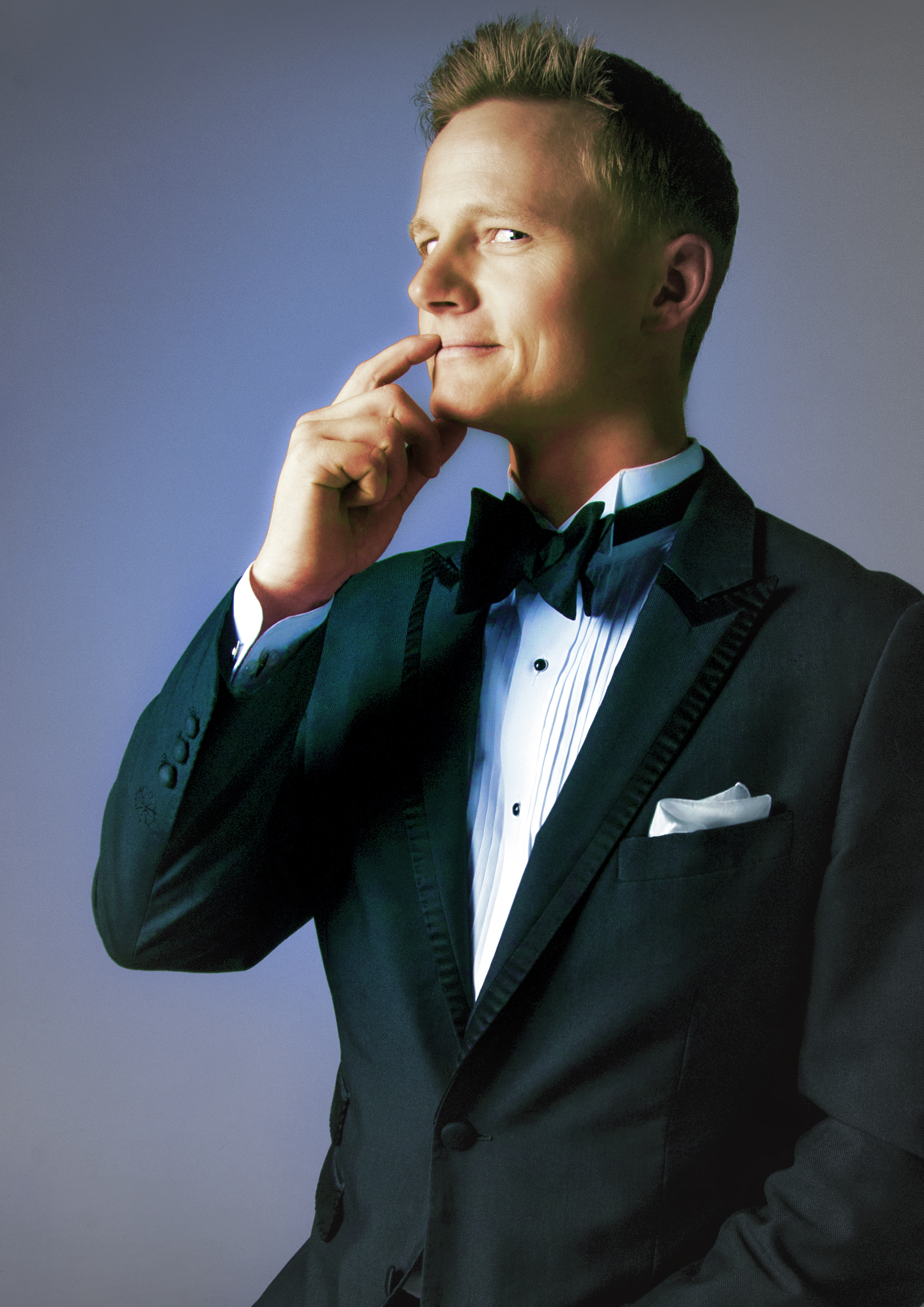
- Ward in 2013
- Born: Joel Ward; September 27, 1983 (age 43); Cardiff, California, US
- Occupations: Magician, comedian, actor

Joel Ward (born September 27, 1983) is an American magician. A Magic Castle favorite, Joel has been seen on The Tonight Show, Penn & Teller: Fool Us, as well as Comedy Central, Bravo, The CW, Fox, and more. He has served as a magic consultant for film/TV projects such as Arrested Development, Netflix's Magic for Humans, Hulu's Shut Eye, Disney's Magic Camp, and for Jane Lynch and Jordan Peele on Funny or Die. He served as Emma Stone's magic consultant for a Vogue original, directed by Ruben Fleisher. He tours regularly with his comedy & magic show and performs full-time at private parties and corporate events.

== Early life ==
Born in La Jolla, California, and raised in Cardiff by the Sea, Joel Ward began entertaining at the age of 6, after his father bought him a book on sleight of hand. He soon started performing for friends and family then eventually at birthday parties as "The Kid – Kids Show Magician." When Ward was 15 he placed 1st at the International Brotherhood of Magicians annual competition, the World's Largest Magic Organization, and from that became the Current World Champion Teen Magician.

== Career ==
Ward's career has included hosting live events, as well as acting, and magic performed around the world. He has performed all over the United States, Canada, Central and South America, Europe, and Asia. In 2012 and 2013 Joel took his full-evening show to Macau, China where he made things appear and disappear and "combined classic tricks with a contemporary touch." His list of credits can be found below. Entertainment Weekly described Ward as a "boy wonder."

== Magician ==
Ward has performed at the Magic Castle in Los Angeles, California several times as well as magic at The Comedy & Magic Club in Hermosa Beach, California. He tours regularly with a comedy and magic show. He has performed for Johnny Depp, Justin Timberlake, Katy Perry, Emma Stone, Jessica Biel, John Mayer, and Warren Buffett. In 1999, Ward was picked out of hundreds of magicians to appear on television with Master Magician, Lance Burton. The show, "Lance Burton-Young Magicians Showcase", was filmed at the Monte Carlo Resort and Casino in Las Vegas, Nevada. Ward's act had changed a lot for Lance Burton's showcase. He began adding new magical elements while still performing his signature "Lost Balloon Routine" and "Dove Color Change" tricks. In 2009, he performed as a guest on The Bonnie Hunt Show. In 2011, he performed as a guest om The Tonight Show with Jay Leno, and in 2011 he made an appearance on Tosh.0. In 2013, Ward was featured in Magic Magazine where they said, "onstage and offstage Joel is energetic, upbeat, yet at the same time casual and laid back. He strives to keep his act modern and fresh". In 2014, Ward consulted for actress Emma Stone in the short digital film for Vogue called A Way In directed by Ruben Fleischer. In 2016, Ward appeared on Penn & Teller: Fool Us. In 2016, Ward joined the live stage show Band of Magicians at the Tropicana Las Vegas for a three-week performance run.

== Acting ==
In 2013, Ward starred in the short film Mango's Magik Mirror by Tom Holland.

== Talk show appearances ==
| YEAR | SHOW NAME |
|---|---|
| 2016 | Penn and Teller Fool Us |
| 2015 | Tosh.0 |
| 2011 | The Tonight Show with Jay Leno |
| 2009 | The Bonnie Hunt Show |
