= Stony Brook University Hospital =

Coordinates: 40.90969°N 73.11578°W

- Stony Brook Medicine

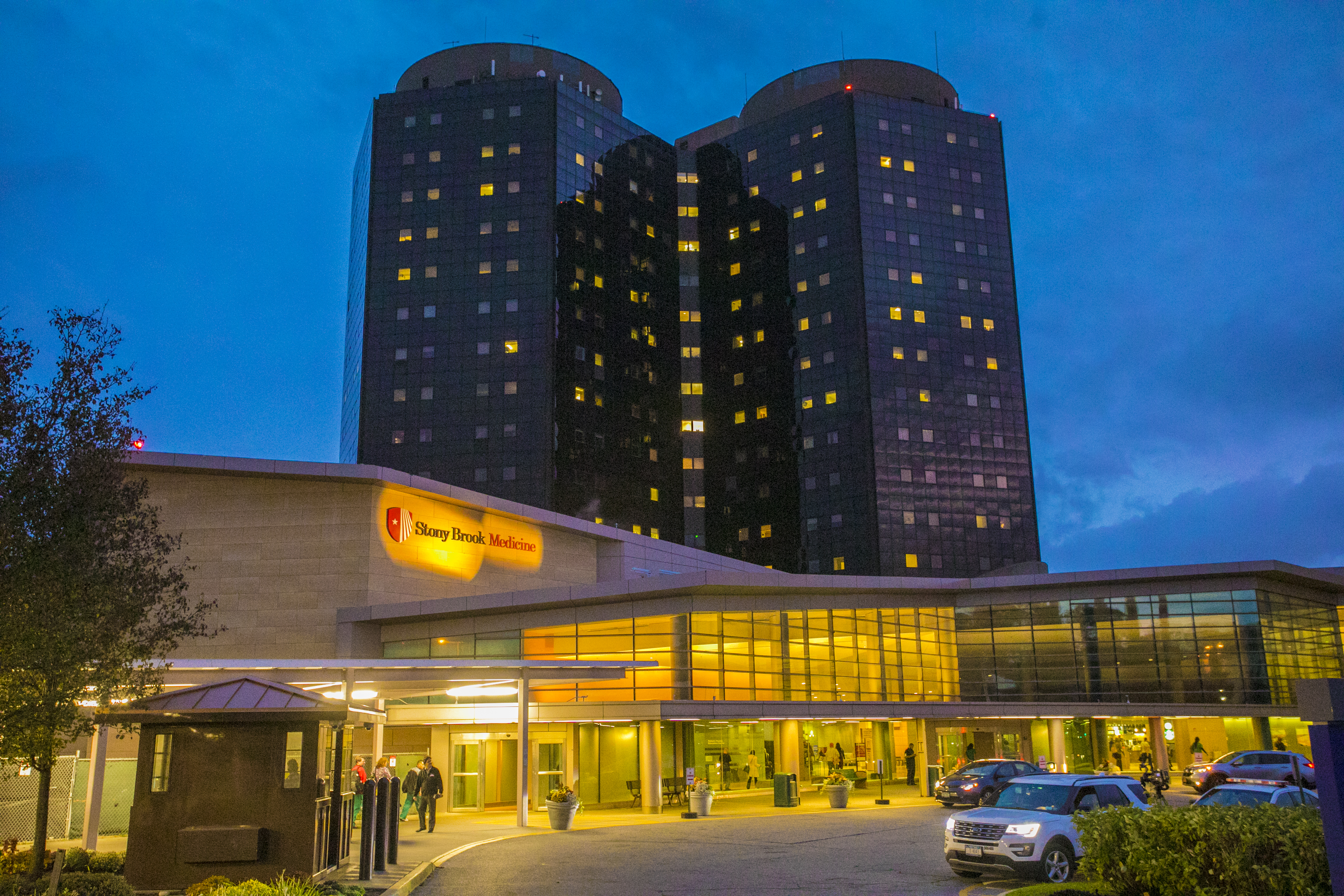
- Entrance to Stony Brook University Hospital

Geography
- Location: 101 Nicolls Road, Stony Brook, New York, United States

Organization
- Type: Teaching
- Affiliated university: Renaissance School of Medicine at Stony Brook University

Services
- Emergency department: Level I Adult Trauma Center / Level I Pediatric Trauma Center
- Beds: 695

Helipads
- Helipad: FAA LID: 13NY
Number	Length		Surface
Number	ft	m	Surface
H1	60x60	18x18	concrete

History
- Former name: Stony Brook University Medical Center
- Founded: 1980

Links
- Website: www.stonybrookmedicine.edu
- Lists: Hospitals in New York State

Stony Brook University Hospital (SBUH), previously known as Stony Brook University Medical Center, is a nationally ranked, 695-bed non-profit, research, and academic medical center located in Stony Brook, New York, providing tertiary care for the entire Long Island region. The medical center is a part of the Stony Brook Medicine Health System and is made up of four hospitals that include the Stony Brook University Hospital, Stony Brook Children's Hospital, Stony Brook Southampton Hospital, and Stony Brook Eastern Long Island Hospital. SBUH is affiliated with the Renaissance School of Medicine at Stony Brook University. Long Island's only tertiary care and a Level 1 Adult and Pediatric Trauma Center, the hospital is ranked as the 12th best in New York and 10th in the New York metropolitan area by U.S. News & World Report. The hospital campus also includes a rooftop helipad to better serve critical cases.

Stony Brook University Hospital has been named one of America’s 100 Best Hospitals by Healthgrades each year since 2019.

== History ==
In November 2008, Stony Brook University Hospital and Southampton Hospital announced that the New York State had approved a comprehensive alliance between the two health care facilities to bring new and strengthened clinical services to the South Fork of Suffolk County. Southampton Hospital was the third East End hospital (in addition to Peconic Bay Medical Center in Riverhead and Eastern Long Island Hospital in Greenport) to affiliate with SBUH.

As of January 2015, Stony Brook University Hospital and Southampton Hospital can move forward with a proposed affiliation agreement following a unanimous vote at the State University of New York (SUNY) Board of Trustees meeting in Albany. The two hospitals have been formally affiliated since 2008, as recommended by the Berger Commission Report issued by New York State Department of Health in 2006.

In June 2020, Stony Brook University Hospital was the site of a bomb threat when 33-year-old Robert Roden walked into the emergency room armed with three explosive devices, a pellet gun and a hatchet; an FBI search of his house discovered Roden's bedroom was booby-trapped with explosives and contained numerous AR-15s. Roden was charged with second-degree criminal possession of a weapon, second-degree criminal contempt, and two counts of third-degree criminal possession of a controlled substance.

== About ==
=== Education ===
The Renaissance School of Medicine at Stony Brook University is responsible for the preclinical and clinical education of medical students (current enrollment: 450). As the only School of Medicine in the region, it offers excellent research and clinical opportunities and has attracted a faculty of national and international renown. There are 21 residency training programs active in the School of Medicine, comprising over 500 full-time residents. Many of these residents also provide care at other nearby hospitals, including the VA Hospital at Northport, Winthrop-University Hospital, Eastern Long Island Hospital, Peconic Bay Medical Center, and Southampton Hospital.

On the same campus as the hospital are the Schools of the Health Sciences Center which consist of four professional schools: the School of Dental Medicine, Health Professions, Nursing and Social Welfare. These four schools offer professional education to over 3,000 students and conduct programs of research, service and continuing professional education. Professional, technical and laboratory resources support the academic activities of the students and faculty.

=== Awards ===
The hospital ranked nationally in two specialties on the 2021 U.S. News & World Report. The hospital ranked as #41 in Neurology and Neurosurgery, and #49 in orthopedics. The hospital also ranked as the 12th best in the state.

== Facilities ==
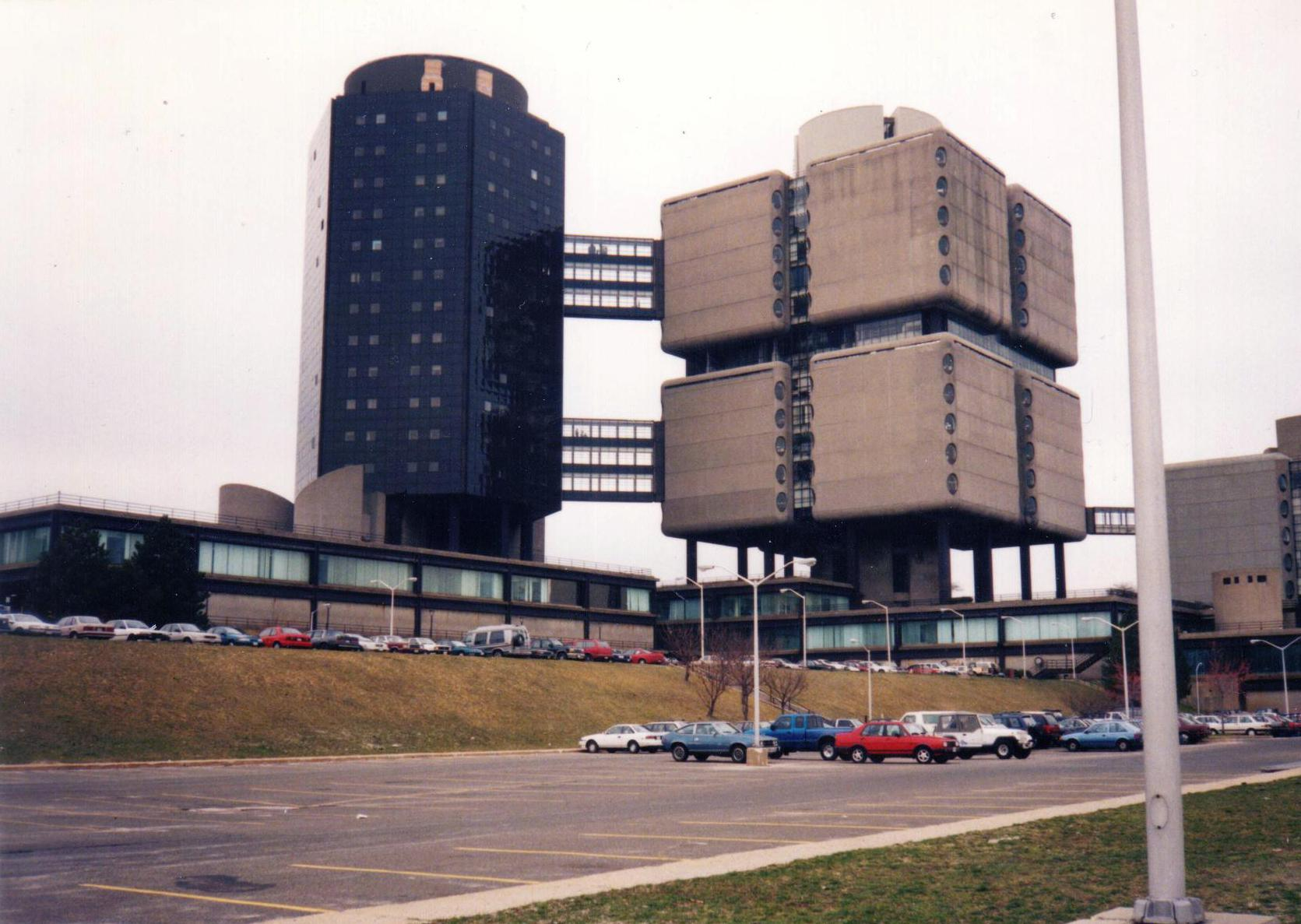
Hospital (left) and Clinical Sciences Tower (right) in 1996. Not pictured is the Basic Sciences Health Tower

Designed by noted Chicago architect Bertrand Goldberg, construction on the complex began in 1976, and the smallest building, the Basic Sciences Health Tower, was completed that year. Two years later, the Clinical Sciences Tower was completed. Finally, in 1980, the Hospital itself was built. The complex of three buildings is located on the "East Campus", and is separated from the rest of Stony Brook University by Nicolls Road. The buildings are 334 feet tall and have a dominating presence over the university skyline, and they can be seen from miles away across Suffolk County.

In September 2008, SBUH opened Phase I of its first major renovation known as the Major Modernization Project. It was the first such renovation of the 28-year-old facility. It includes a new wing, which houses the Woman and Infants Center, an expanded Emergency Department and a Surgical Suite with an OR Pharmacy.

Located a short walk away from SBUH is the Center for Outpatient Services at Stony Brook University, which opened its doors in March 2007. Service areas within the Center include The Imaging Center (which is home to a 40-slice positron emission tomography/computed tomography PET/CT camera), the Center for Pain Management, and the Outpatient Cancer Center, which includes the Carol M. Baldwin Breast Care Center, Medical Oncology, Pediatric Hematology/Oncology and Surgical Oncology. The new facility offers easy access, free parking and valet services, spacious and tranquil public areas and on-site food services.

A new Heart Center was opened inside the hospital in 2005, containing a new Cardiac Intensive Care Unit (CICU), Cardiac Acute Care Unit (CACU), angioplasty suites (catheterization labs), and electrophysiology labs.

The Stony Brook College campus is also ranked as a top 100 university in the US by US News.

=== Campus ===
- Stony Brook Heart Institute
- Stony Brook Cancer Center
- Stony Brook Children's Hospital
- Stony Brook Neurosciences Institute
- Stony Brook Digestive Disorders Institute
- Stony Brook Ambulatory Surgical Center

== Stony Brook Children’s Hospital ==
Stony Brook Children's Hospital
- Stony Brook Medicine

Organisation
- Type: Children's Hospital
- Affiliated university: Renaissance School of Medicine at Stony Brook University

Services
- Emergency department: Level 1 Pediatric Trauma Center
- Beds: 106

History
- Constructed: 2014
- Founded: 2010

Links
- Website: www.stonybrookchildrens.org

Stony Brook Children's Hospital (SBCH) formerly Stony Brook Long Island Children's Hospital is a pediatric acute care hospital located on the Stony Brook University Hospital campus in Stony Brook, New York. The hospital has 106 beds. It is affiliated with The Renaissance School of Medicine at Stony Brook University, and is a member of Stony Brook Medicine. The hospital provides comprehensive pediatric specialties and subspecialties to infants, children, teens, and young adults aged 0–21 and beyond throughout the Long Island region. Stony Brook Children's Hospital features the only pediatric Level 1 Trauma Center in the region, and one of few in the state.

=== History ===
Stony Brook Children's Hospital originally opened up in 2010 under the name of Stony Brook Long Island Children's Hospital. SBCH originally consisted of pediatric units within the adult hospital. The project to build a new children's hospital building was announced in 2013 by university officials; and construction started in 2014.

In 2017, the hospital was verified as a Level 1 Pediatric Trauma Center by the American College of Surgeons after meeting the stringent requirements.

The hospital opened up a new four story expansion to the children's hospital in 2019. The expansion consisted of 71,500 square-feet, and expansive amenities designed to ease fears of patients including playrooms for children and teens. The hospital also opened up a new Ronald McDonald family room to serve the parents and children.

In 2024, the hospital raised $23 million to build a 60,000-square-foot Ronald McDonald House at Stony Brook Hospital, the first in Suffolk County.

=== Patient care units ===
- 18-bed adolescent unit - General Inpatient Care for ages 12–21
- 9-bed Children's ED - Pediatric Emergent Cases
- 46-bed Neonatal Intensive Care Unit - Intensive Care For Neonates
- 12-bed Pediatric Intensive Care Unit - Care For Critical Pediatric Patients
- 21-bed General Pediatrics - General Pediatric Care

=== Awards ===
On the U.S. News & World Report 2014-15 Best Children's Hospitals the hospital ranked as #50 in the nation in pediatric nephrology.
