= Rick Lax =

American author and entertainer (born 1982)

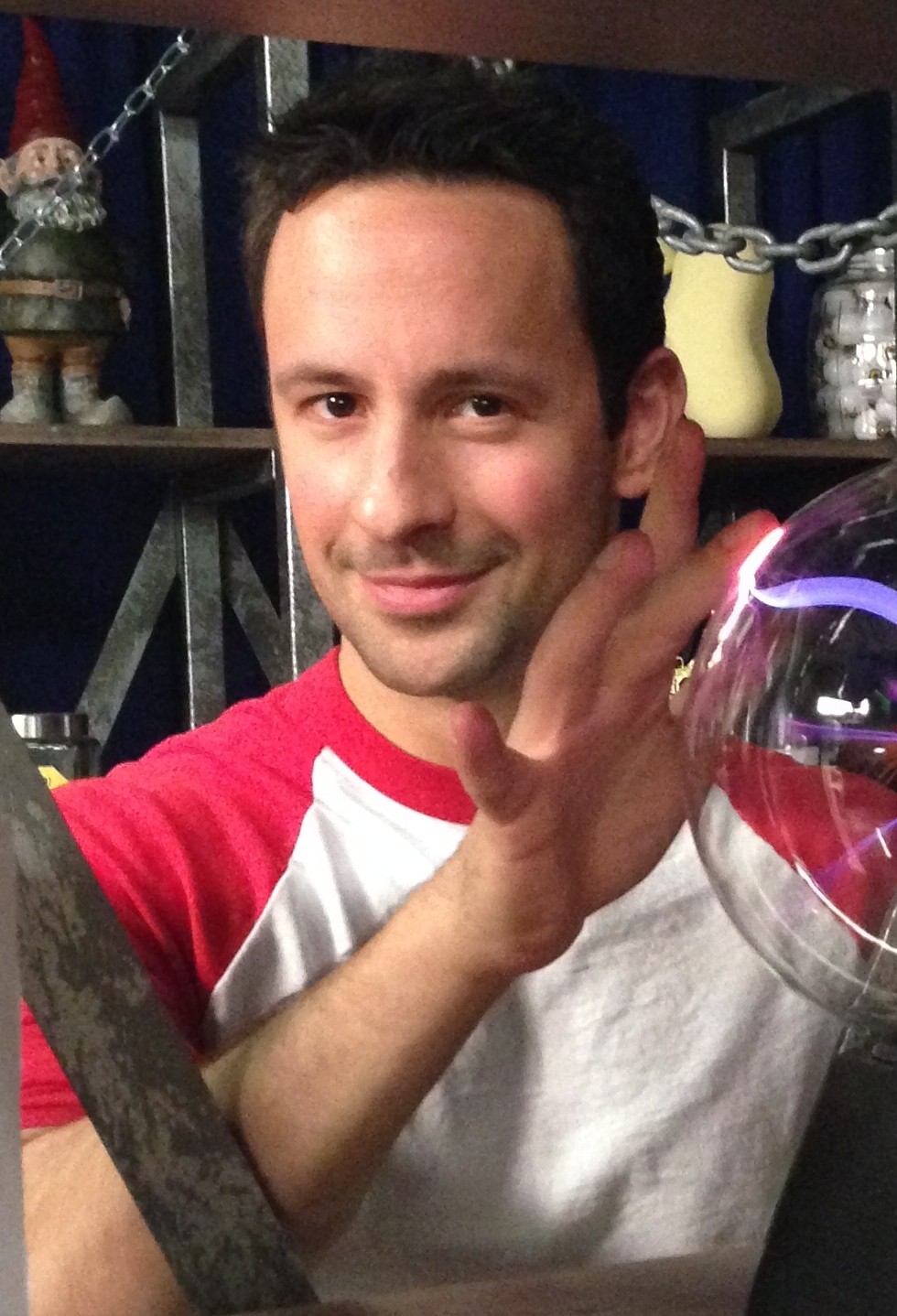
- Lax in May 2014
- Born: April 17, 1982 (age 44); Detroit, Michigan
- Education: DePaul University
- Occupation: Entertainer
- Years active: 2008–present
- Known for: Wizard Wars; Penn & Teller: Fool Us; Viral Facebook content
- Website: ricklax.com

Rick Lax (born April 17, 1982) is an American author, entertainer, and magician. He is a notable creator of viral content on Facebook.

== Early life and education ==
Born in Detroit, Lax's interest in magic began at age 5, inspired by David Copperfield. After attending Michigan State University and studying political science at the University of Michigan, he earned a Juris Doctor degree from DePaul University, and subsequently passed the Illinois bar.

== Career ==
Lax was a friend and the first manager of rock band Tally Hall, beginning in 2004. He also appeared in videos by the band.

From 2011 to 2013, Lax worked as a behind-the-scenes consultant for Copperfield and wrote two books about Las Vegas. He also created the TV show Wizard Wars, which aired for two seasons on the Syfy network in 2014.

In 2015, Lax competed on The CW's Penn & Teller: Fool Us. He performed an original card trick called Binary Code, and was the only contestant to fool Penn & Teller during the episode.

Lax continues to work as a show producer and behind-the-scenes magic consultant.

In 2015, Lax started releasing videos on Facebook. By 2019, he was gaining more than a billion views every month. Also that year, Lax launched Making Magic, which features Lax interviewing fellow magicians. Lax later launched a network of over 180 content creators dedicated to creating viral content for Facebook. Notable content created by Richard Lax's network includes pranks, life hacks, "shocking interactions between strangers" (some of which were pre-existing clips purchased from sites like Jukin Media) "weird inspirational content", and gross-out videos featuring food.

By October 2020, Lax's Facebook page had the second highest reach on the entire Facebook platform. Lax and his associates made considerable money as a result of their videos, but Lax has said he has received thousands of death threats as a result of his content. Lax's network was severely negatively impacted by changes to Facebook's algorithm in March 2022 that penalised "watchbait" videos that create "arbitrary" curiosity gaps or "promise sensational revelations".

== Publications ==
- Lawyer Boy: A Case Study on Growing Up. St. Martin's Press. 2008. ISBN 978-0312373351.
- Fool Me Once: Hustlers, Hookers, Headliners, and How Not to Get Screwed in Vegas. ST. Martin's Griffin. 2011. ISBN 978-0312545703.
- I Get Paid for This: Kicking Ass and Taking Notes in Vegas. Huntington Press. 2012. ISBN 978-1935396505.
