= Hustling America =

Television series showcasing Alexis Conran's American hustles

- Written by: Alexis Conran
- Presented by: Alexis Conran
- Country of origin: America
- No. of episodes: 3

Related
- The Real Hustle

Hustling America is a three part television series. It is presented by Alexis Conran. This is similar to Conran's UK show The Real Hustle, in the case that he goes around scamming people and creating Proposition Bets with them. It features Conran travelling across America retesting old scams by famous con-artists such as Titanic Thompson. The first episode took place in New York, the second in Texas and the third in Las Vegas.

== Episodes ==
=== New York ===
Conran travels to New York and tries out a birthday bet. Testing to see if in a group of 30, that 2 or more people will share a birthday. He plays table tennis against a professional (with coke bottles). Conran attempts to remove the cork from a wine bottle with his shoes. Finally he places an eating bet against world champion food eaters. His eating partner has a twin, giving Conran the edge when the twins switch offstage.

=== Texas ===
In the second episode Conran comes to Texas and experiments some scams by Titanic Thompson. He throws a walnut over a building, to win himself a car. Conran races someone who is in a lift by taking the stairs in an 11 floor building. Conran attempts to throw all 52 playing cards into his hat of which he won from another proposition bet, by taking off his waistcoat without removing his jacket. Finally he attempted Thompson's first ever prop bet where he would mark an X on a rock and throw it into the river. Then his dog would go in and fetch that particular rock. However, for Conran this ended up being a failure, resulting in him losing the bet.

=== Las Vegas ===
In Conran's third and final episode, he wins a bet that makes him win himself free gas. He places a bet on which sugar cube a fly would land on, he ends up taking this bet too far and losing. This requires him spending the night in prison. Conran made a bet with people that he could toss a coin and shoot a hole through the centre, he won this one and got his car washed in return. Finally Conran visited a man called Brian Zembic and learned about his life and bets. In particular his most famous one where he got man boobs.
