= Jessica-Jane Clement =

British actor and model

- Born: 24 February 1985 (age 41); Sheffield, South Yorkshire, England
- Other names: Jess Clement; JJC
- Occupations: Actress; television presenter; glamour model
- Known for: The Real Hustle; I'm a Celebrity...Get Me Out of Here!
- Spouse: Lee Stafford (m. 2013)
- Children: 4

Jessica-Jane Stafford (née Clement; born 24 February 1985) is an English actress, television presenter and former glamour model who is best known for starring in the BBC programme The Real Hustle from 2006 to 2012.

== Early life ==
She attended High Storrs School in Sheffield, studied Performing Arts and Psychology at The Sheffield College before going on to study at the Dartington College of Arts. As a child she studied ballet, tap, jazz dance and gymnastics.

== Career ==
=== Modeling ===
Clement began her career as a successful glamour model, including as a Page Three model. At the age of 18 she appeared in Playboy and modelled for photographers Byron Newman, Rankin and Bob Carlos Clarke where she was also his 'Living Doll' in exhibition 'Love Dolls Never Die'. She went on to appear in numerous lads' mags, with her modelling career intensifying as a result of her popularity in The Real Hustle and after having two breast augmentations. Clement has starred in the music videos for several songs including You and Me by British dance act Uniting Nations, Craig David's All the Way, Christian Blaizer's All I Want and Studio B's I see Girls.

Since 2010, Clement has been a spokesmodel for grooming product company Lynx, promoting their Lynx Rise range.

Clement placed #54 in Zoo's Hot 101 of 2009, #26 in Nuts' 100 Sexiest of 2009, #32 in the Zoo Top 100 Beach Babe Awards 2011 and was #46 in FHM's 100 Sexiest Women of 2009.

=== TV and films ===
Clement's acting career started in 2000 when she was 15 years old after being spotted and cast in her first short movie for the Northern Media School. Clement went on to perform in several theatre productions including Threepenny Opera and The Lion, The Witch and The Wardrobe.

Since 2006, Clement has starred in the BBC TV series The Real Hustle, a spin-off of the BBC drama series Hustle. Along with Alex Conran and Paul Wilson she demonstrates confidence and magic tricks, distraction scams and proposition bets on members of the public, to show viewers how to avoid being fooled by them. As of 2012, Clement has starred in all 106 episodes of all eleven series. She has also starred in all of the one-off specials: The 12 Scams Of Christmas, Winter Special, Worlds' Greatest Bar Bets, Best Ever Cons, Don't Miss A Trick and The Real Hustle Around the World.

Her other acting roles include starring as Cindi Marshall in Sky TV's Dream Team for two series from 2005 to 2007 and playing the role of the Jade Dragon escort in the 2005 film Moussaka & Chips.

In November 2008, Clement took part in the BBC Three show Celebrity Scissorhands in aid of Children in Need. In 2009 she appeared in Doghouse, a British zombie comedy, in which she played the leading character's girlfriend and the long-running British hospital drama Casualty, playing Jackie, a new member of the ambulance/paramedic crew.

From 13 November 2011, Clement took part in the eleventh series of ITV's reality television show I'm a Celebrity...Get Me Out of Here!. She was voted out on 28 November 2011, five days before the end of the series and was in the jungle for fifteen of the nineteen days, returning along with the rest of her camp-mates for the final Coming Out episode.

Also in November 2011, Clement presented the programme Skin Deep: The Business of Beauty, which was broadcast daily on BBC3 between 14 and 18 November 2011. In January 2012, she presented a BBC documentary titled Britain in Bed in which she revealed how British attitudes to sex have changed over the last 50 years. In 2013, she presented The Body Shocking Show alongside Pete Firman, which began on 14 March 2013.

Also in 2013, she starred in the short film Two Persons Max, for which she won the award for Best Supporting Actress at the Los Angeles Movie Awards. On 6 March 2014, she appeared in the third episode of the Sky1 series The Smoke, playing Tanya, a mixed martial arts ring girl.

2014 saw the release of horror film Devil's Tower, in which Clement played Kate. She received positive reviews for her role, with Gareth Jones of Dread Central saying: "In the supporting realm, [Clement] nearly steals the show as sexpot Kate, the gossipy neighbour whose delightful demeanour is the only thing that keeps her persistent nosiness from crossing the line. She’s note-perfect in the part from beginning to end".

In 2015, she appeared in the Channel 4 documentary show, The Auction House, with her husband, Lee Stafford.

In 2016, Clement starred as Jasmine in comedy Gangsters, Gamblers and Geezers, a story about two lovable losers, Krish and Lee who get fired from their call centre jobs. 2016 also saw Clement star in Redwood alongside Buffy star Nicholas Brandon, about a couple who go hiking in the woods and disturb a nest of vampires. Clement finished off 2016 starring as Gillian alongside Alex Zane in Cannibals and Carpet Fitters, a comedy horror about a group of carpet fitters who are sent on a job to an old Country house in the middle of nowhere.

In 2017, Clement filmed up and coming movies Order Of Kings: The Dark Kingdom - a medieval fantasy drama, as well as horror movie Black Site and dark comedy Dead Ringer.

In 2022, Clement played a supporting role in the MTV original television film All I Didn’t Want for Christmas, co-starring alongside Kel Mitchell as his character Wolf’s Elven boss at Santa Claus’s workshop in the North Pole. The film also stars Gabourey Sidibe and Loretta Devine.

In 2023, she made an uncredited appearance with her husband in the finals of series 17 of The Apprentice.

== Personal life ==
On 17 February 2013, Clement married hairdresser Lee Stafford. Jessica gave birth to their first child, a son named Angel, in June 2014. She gave birth to their second child, a daughter named Elvis Annie-Jane, in January 2016. In April 2017 she gave birth to their third child, a girl named Sugar May, and a fourth, a boy named Valentine Love, followed in February 2020.

Clement is a campaigner for animal rights. She has worked with PETA and has written and campaigned against testing cosmetics on animals.

=== Hearing loss ===
At age 20 Clement suddenly lost hearing in her right ear. In 2012, she was fitted with a Phonak Lyric hearing device. Since then she has worked as a celebrity ambassador for Phonak, helping to raise awareness of hearing loss.
