= Tamara Beckwith =

English socialite and television personality (born 1970)

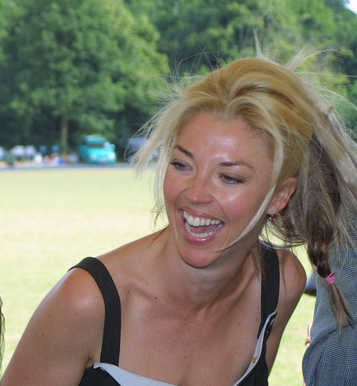
- Beckwith at Ham Polo Club in 2003
- Born: Tamara Camilla Jane Beckwith; 17 April 1970 (age 55); Hammersmith, London, England
- Occupations: Socialite, television personality
- Children: 3

Tamara Camilla Jane Beckwith (born 17 April 1970) is an English socialite and television personality. In the 1990s, she was regarded as one of the "It girls" of the London social scene.

== Early life ==
The daughter of property developer Peter Beckwith, Beckwith grew up in Kew, south-western Greater London, where she attended the local state primary school, Queens School, before moving to Wimbledon, London in the early 1980s. She attended Cheltenham Ladies' College, before leaving to attend the sixth form college, MPW in London, although she left in order to have her first daughter.

== Career ==
Beckwith has appeared on many television programmes such as Shooting Stars, Brass Eye, Loose Women, Celebrities Under Pressure, The Big Breakfast, Trigger Happy TV, I'm Famous and Frightened!, So You Want To Be A Teacher and Dancing on Ice. She has been a presenter for MTV, VH1 and regularly appeared as a reporter for television shows including This Morning and Watchdog.

In 2007, she appeared on the BBC's reality TV programme Celebrity Scissorhands where Lee Stafford trained celebrities to cut hair, raising money as part of the BBC charity Children in Need. Beckwith has also appeared in The Vagina Monologues.

On 10 April 2008, Beckwith participated in a celebrity edition of the Channel 4 show Come Dine with Me with MC Harvey, Jonathan Ansell and Lynsey de Paul. Beckwith finished in third place.. She appeared a further time on Come Dine with Me in 2011.

Beckwith was one of the dealers on the Channel 4 show Four Rooms, in the third series which aired daily from April 2013.

Beckwith designs a range of Diamonique jewellery for QVC UK. She is a contributing Editor for Hello writing and styling features.

She opened The Little Black Gallery, a photography gallery in Chelsea, London, in November 2008.

She was a contestant on Series 3 of The Jump in 2016.

== Personal life ==
Beckwith was engaged to Sharon Stone's brother, Michael, before marrying Italian construction heir Giorgio Veroni in Venice on 27 August 2007.

On 2 September 2008, while appearing on ITV2's CelebAir, it was revealed that Beckwith was pregnant with her second child.

On 26 October 2014 they had a son.

John Beckwith is her uncle.
