= Lee Stafford =

British hairdresser

- Born: 17 October 1966 (age 60); Leigh-on-Sea, England
- Education: The King John School
- Occupation: Hairdresser
- Spouse: Jessica-Jane Clement (m. 2013)
- Children: 4
- Website: leestafford.com

Lee Stafford (born 17 October 1966) is an English celebrity hairdresser.

== Career ==
Stafford opened his first hair salon, The House That Hair Built, in 1984, in Leigh-on-Sea, Essex. He opened his second salon in Aughton, Sheffield in 1992 called Geezers. His career took off in 1997 when he won the title of Men's British Hairdresser of the Year. In 2000 he opened his second hair salon in Wardour Street, London, W1. In 2001 Stafford launched his own range of haircare products. In 2007 he appeared on the BBC television series Celebrity Scissorhands where he trained celebrities such as Tamara Beckwith and 1980s pop star Steve Strange to cut hair. The programme raised money for the BBC's charity Children in Need. On 6 November 2011, Stafford featured on the Secret Millionaire television series on Channel 4. Stafford appeared on Pointless Celebrities in 2013 and again in February 2017 (broadcast dates).

== Personal life ==
Stafford was born in Leigh-on-Sea, Essex in 1966. He married model and The Real Hustle star Jessica-Jane Clement in 2013. He is a father of four children.

== Awards list ==
=== Won ===
2006

- The Dean Holmes National Hairdressing Federation Celebrity Hairdresser Of The Year
- Hair Magazine Hairdresser Of The Year

2004

- Best British Hairdresser of 2004 – Fellowship of Hairdressers Awards

2001

- Influential Hairdresser – Creative HEAD magazine's Most Wanted Awards

1997

- Men's British Hairdresser of the Year 1997 – 1998

=== Business Award List ===
2009

- BHBA Business & Website Innovation of the year

2005

- The BHBA Salon Design Award 2005 for Brighton salon

2002

- Growing Business of the Year Award 2002
- Training and Development Award 2002
- Investors in People Award 2002

1999

- British Manager of the Year 1999 – 2000 (1 of 6 nominees)
- British Salon of the Year 1999 – 2000 (1 of 6 nominees)

=== Salon's Award List ===
2005

- The BHBA Salon Design Award 2005 for my Brighton salon

2002

- Growing Business of the Year Award 2002
- Training and Development Award 2002
- Investors in People Award 2002

1999

- British Manager of the Year 1999 – 2000 (one of six nominees)
- British Salon of the Year 1999 – 2000 (one of six nominees)
