= List of The Real Hustle episodes =

This is an episode list for The Real Hustle. All dates are the first broadcast on BBC Three in the United Kingdom. There have been 106 episodes broadcast over 11 series and an additional 3 special episodes and 3 related programmes.

== Series overview ==
Series	Episodes	Originally released	
Series	Episodes	First released	Last released
1	8	9 February 2006	30 March 2006
2	10	7 September 2006	9 November 2006
3	8	15 March 2007	3 May 2007
4	12	30 July 2007	15 October 2007
5	8	12 February 2008	24 March 2008
6	10	9 October 2008	11 December 2008
7	10	21 May 2009	23 July 2009
8	10	14 January 2010	25 February 2010
9	10	29 July 2010	17 September 2010
10	10	5 September 2011	20 January 2012
11	10	27 January 2012	30 March 2012

== Episodes ==
=== Series 1 (2006) ===
No. overall	No. in series	Title	Original release date
1	1	"Episode 1"	9 February 2006
The team performs the classic monte scam at the beach (The Monte), Paul and Alex steal a necklace by pretending to catch a counterfeiter (The Jewellery Shop Scam), and a proposition bet involves three shots and three pints, steal information from your computer using a keylogger (the keylogger scam), pick someone's pocket using a packet of mustard (the mustard dip), and steal deposits by renting a flat they don't own.
2	2	"Episode 2"	16 February 2006
Scams include overcharging for worthless packages (the postal scam), a proposition bet to swap a shot of whisky with a shot of water, selling forged lottery tickets (the lottery scam), stealing a laptop from an airport using an x-ray machine and a lookalike laptop bag, steal a bag by distracting a mark with a window tap (the window tap) and conning aspiring popstars into handing over £500 to produce a tacky demo tape (the bogus agency scam).
3	3	"Episode 3"	23 February 2006
The team reveal how fake customs officers are committing daylight robbery by stripping unwitting travellers of their supposedly contraband possessions (the customs seize scam), a pool proposition bet to test who can get a pool ball further by pushing down on the ball, the jam auction, run a "pop the balloon" booth at a fairground, steal a laptop by asking someone to mind one of the hustler's bag (mind my bag) and steal credit card information by offering a wifi network that seems legit (the wifi scam).
4	4	"Episode 4"	2 March 2006
The team trick a barman into paying a reward for a supposedly valuable ring using "the honeytrap" (the ring reward rip-off). Then they con punters at a car-boot sale into buying worthless scraps of paper in a Black money scam, perform a proposition bet that requires the mark to turn 3 cups up in 3 moves, show the postman scam in the art of the pickpocket and deceive three professional poker players from The Hendon Mob by bringing in a cold deck and sleight of hand.
5	5	"Episode 5"	9 March 2006
The hustlers sell a hire car over and over again (the hire-car scam), trick a shop owner into accepting counterfeit bills by making them seem like they came from the shop's till (the counterfeit cash con), show how 'blue-jacking' phones brings dividends, win a proposition bet that really steals money from a bar by performing a magic trick, pick a pocket using the pinch-push pocket pick, and clone ATM cards by using a card reader to steal bank card data and PINs.
6	6	"Episode 6"	16 March 2006
The team claim compensation for "damaged" goods after orchestrating an accident (the melon drop), reveal real chances of winning at a fruit machine and a cheat to get info about them, use other people's phones to call premium-rate lines (the courier con), propose a proposition bet in a pool hall, steal marks' bags using a larger bag with a false bottom (the booster bag scam) and make unsuspecting drivers pay for false parking tickets (the car park con).
7	7	"Episode 7"	23 March 2006
They obtain credit cards in a victim's name just from items found in rubbish bins (the i.d. theft hustle), steal valuables by pretending to be lost (the map scam), beg money with a sob story (the sob story scam), bet a pool player with a tricky shot (proposition bet), confuse shopkeepers into giving them too much change (the change raising con) and run tin can alley at a fairground.
8	8	"Episode 8"	30 March 2006
The hustlers rig a dice game "put and take" (the rigged dice rip off), win a proposition bet involving 3 match boxes, pretend that they have psychic powers (the psychic scam), a pool hustle involving 1 ball stacked on top of two others and a review of the scams throughout the series.

=== Series 2 (2006) ===
No. overall	No. in series	Title	Original release date
1	9	"Episode 1"	7 September 2006
The team con a delivery man into giving them his goods (Van Dragging), make sure a couple of people in a cafe overhear a phone conversation about an 'expensive' plate (Eaves Drop Scam) and then bring out a duplicate of the plate and do the Eaves Drop Scam again and again, win another round of drinks with a Proposition Bet about drinking a shot hidden under a hat, replace a man's wallet with a wad of newspaper (The Phantom Wallet) and get someone to buy a car before making off with the car and the cash (Home Alone). City of London Police DCI Richard Jack and Dr Paul Seager, a lecturer in Forensic & Social Psychology, add their comments.
2	10	"Episode 2"	14 September 2006
The hustlers steal a handbag then trick the victim into revealing her card PIN via a fake customer service line (The Bag and Pin Snatch), steal household belongings through front door letterboxes (The Long Stick), use a Proposition Bet on the circumference of a beer glass being longer than its height to get a free round, empty a woman's bank account by swapping her bank card as she's using it (The Cash Card Switch) and collect companies' takings by 'guarding' a bank's disabled night-safe (The Drop Box). DCI Richard Jack (City of London Police) and former master forger and security consultant Frank Abagnale are interviewed.
3	11	"Episode 3"	21 September 2006
How to steal someone's car by pretending to be a valet parking service, pretending to have an injured leg so as to steal watches, a proposition bet where you lift a shot glass using two coins, a shop selling hugely marked up "organic skin care" beauty products and a waitress skimming credit cards.
4	12	"Episode 4"	28 September 2006
The hustlers earn deposits on mobile phones that will never sell, and how not to lose your wallet to fake security guards.
5	13	"Episode 5"	5 October 2006
How to steal a car with a clever bit of role playing and how a mock auction can con members of the public into buying cheap goods.
6	14	"Episode 6"	12 October 2006
How to con members of the public into giving away credit card details via a fake charity scratch card.
7	15	"Episode 7"	19 October 2006
Laptop memory upgrade con, picking pockets in a cafe, best of three coin toss con, hacking wireless network and selling cheap knives with an infomercial.
8	16	"Episode 8"	26 October 2006
Paul, Alex and Jess set up an exclusive fashion store, but what their customers don't realise is that their vintage purchases are just worthless second hand clothes. Alex works his charms as a fake waiter and Paul dupes another punter into buying him a free drink. One woman learns never to let bogus workmen into her house and the Hustlers expose an ATM scam that could leave your bank account empty.
9	17	"Episode 9"	2 November 2006
This episode uncovers a car clamping scam that could leave you £50 out of pocket. The hustlers show us how simple it is to sell non-organic produce as organic with a marked up price, and Paul shows us how easy it is to con the public out of their cash in an origami scam that leaves you with a worthless £10 note.
10	18	"Episode 10"	9 November 2006
Alex and Paul set up a market stall that sells fake showbiz memorabilia and dodgy autographs, while Jess sells non-existent bus tour vouchers to unsuspecting tourists. Plus, three ways you could be short-changed after buying something.

=== Series 3 (2007) ===
No. overall	No. in series	Title	Original release date
1	19	"Episode 1"	15 March 2007
Alex and Paul sell games consoles at cheap prices to get some lads to give them their cash. Also Jess and Alex use a hotel to steal someone's credit card details just by overhearing their name and room number.
2	20	"Episode 2"	22 March 2007
Alex drops a wallet full of Euros in the Drop Swindle. Jess fills a bag with leaflets in the tourist information centre and sells them to marks as discount packs. Paul gets free drinks by putting a 10p through a hole in a £10 note which only seems large enough for a 5p. Alex pretends to be a concierge and makes off with luggage outside a hotel. Alex and Paul get a dog from the dog's home and sell it for £200 by tricking the buyer into thinking that it is of a valuable pedigree breed.
3	21	"Episode 3"	29 March 2007
Jess cons people into giving her money in a pub by posing as a barmaid. Paul gets a neighbouring table to pay for his bill in a restaurant. Alex wins a proposition bet involving a £20 note and a beer bottle. Jess signs up unsuspecting passers-by to an expensive text message service by asking to borrow their mobile phones by pretending she needs to send an important, but ordinary text; she actually subscribes them. Paul and Alex win big by stacking the deck in a game of drunken poker.
4	22	"Episode 4"	5 April 2007
Paul accidentally overpays for a purchase in an antique shop with his last cheque. He asks for the change in cash, but of course, the cheque is going to bounce. Alex reconfigures mobiles phones causing them to ring premium phone lines belonging to the hustlers. Paul wins a proposition bet involving a chain and a ring. Paul and Alex try their luck at backgammon with controlled dice shots and hustling techniques. Jess walks into a high street computing store to steal expensive software off of the display Apple Macintosh computers.
5	23	"Episode 5"	12 April 2007
The hustlers demonstrate pickpocketing techniques while crossing the road. Paul sells an envelope of worthless newspaper to some students, fooling them that it is full of cash. Jess wins a proposition bet involving hands and elbows. Paul and Alex demonstrate extreme social compliance by posing as policeman investigating suspected stolen goods, only to steal the goods themselves. They also use mis-spotted and loaded dice to scam other gamblers in a casino.
6	24	"Episode 6"	19 April 2007
Alex and Jess fake an argument in a jeweller's shop allowing Paul to use sleight of hand to steal an expensive watch. Alex cons restaurants by pretending his tie was stained with wine, then increases the amount written on the cheques. Alex wins a proposition bet with a pedantic definition of the phrase "in thirty seconds". Paul and Alex demonstrate social compliance by posing as police officers. Alex and Paul use past posting to rip-off a roulette wheel.
7	25	"Episode 7"	16 April 2007
Paul and Alex pose as gas installers and rip off unsuspecting householders. Jess hacks into a cash machine to double her money. Paul wins a proposition bet involving a saucer of liquid and some matches. All three hustlers get a free lunch with an elaborate series of coordinated scams against a restaurant. Paul and Alex use memory, observational, and mathematical techniques to win at Blackjack.
8	26	"Episode 8"	3 May 2007
Paul and Alex sell dodgy camcorders from a white van to unsuspecting members of the public. The gang con a pub into letting them take away a fruit machine in plain sight. Jess wins a proposition bet involving three stacks of 10p coins. Alex, posing as a respectable restaurant owner, sells one bottle of cheap wine for £240. Alex and Paul steal chips from other players in a casino.

=== Series 4 (2007) ===
No. overall	No. in series	Title	Original release date
1	27	"Episode 1"	27 July 2007
Alex and Jess rob a hotel room by posing as hotel employees; Jess and Paul pretend to be from a film crew, ask a mark if they can rent his car as a prop, and drive off right in front of him; Jess wins a proposition bet using three full and three empty shot glasses, then scams herself a free beauty session; the hustlers head to Ibiza to fool holidaymakers into parting with their money for some worthless purses.
2	28	"Episode 2"	6 August 2007
Alex and Jess empty a house by faking a security survey and a prize draw; in Ibiza, the team sell fake jewels; Paul wins a proposition bet involving money and your third finger; Alex swaps the padlock from a fitness club attender and clears out his locker; and the hustlers sell bogus miracle fat-busting products.
3	29	"Episode 3"	13 August 2007
The hustlers sell a fake device which supposedly adds credit to an Oyster Card; cheat in 3 card brag by marking cards and using reflections; win a proposition bet trying to knock a 10p piece off your forehead; demonstrate pickpocketing using distraction techniques; and use police costumes to sell advertising in a fake magazine.
4	30	"Episode 4"	20 August 2007
The hustlers pass counterfeit cash by previously handing shops a pen that supposedly detects counterfeit notes; demonstrate scams that a bartender can pull; win a proposition bet balancing a wineglass on a bill; get people to buy fake gym memberships; and cheat at a game of gin.
5	31	"Episode 5"	27 August 2007
The gang sell a car but keep a spare set of keys to steal it back (The Boomerang); install a fake cash machine to duplicate the cards and PINs of unsuspecting passers-by (The Cash Machine Con); win a proposition bet involving listing words without the letters A, B, C, J, K and M; go undercover as recruitment consultants but the only thing they're making a career out of is identity theft (The Recruitment Scam); and demonstrate electronic devices to help beat the casino (Casino Gambling Devices).
6	32	"Episode 6"	3 September 2007
The gang pull off an escrow scan by pretending to be a trustworthy pub landlord; manage to persuade a couple to give them £200 for some worthless vouchers in the pretense of a prize draw; sell overpriced goods (for example, 100 nails described as "100 metal coat hangers") without technically lying; and use skillful sleight-of-hand techniques to beat the Blackjack table. The probability bet involves drinking a shot of rum without spilling a drop.
7	33	"Episode 7"	10 September 2007
The hustlers make up an event, hire a band, then steal their equipment; sell fake tickets for a club night in Ibiza; demonstrate a fairground pendulum game that is physically impossible to win; and deliver empty parcels, cash on delivery, to unsuspecting small businesses. The proposition bet involves balancing a glass on top of three glasses and three knives.
8	34	"Episode 8"	17 September 2007
The gang rely on the goodwill of hotel owners towards (fake) VIP guests to make them pay for worthless deliveries; play Three-card Monte to hustle some holidaymakers; park a 'broken down' refrigerated delivery van in a residential street and need to sell its contents quickly, but sell empty boxes instead; and sell dolls' house furniture to people who assume it is the full size thing on an Internet auction site. The proposition bet involves separating two glasses without touching them.
9	35	"Episode 9"	24 September 2007
The hustlers fool a white van man into thinking he has hit a pedestrian and get him to pay for her "damaged" laptop (The Flop); rip-off some holidaymakers with what looks like a very cheap exchange rate but sell them blank paper instead of cash (Exchange Rate Rip-Off); demonstrate an unfair fairground game involving throwing hoops over clothes pegs (Peg A Prize) and drive off an expensive car with a fake hotel valet parking slip (Valet Steal). The Proposition Bet involves drinking from a sherry glass (placed upside down in a larger brandy glass) without touching it with your hands.
10	36	"Episode 10"	1 October 2007
Paul takes full advantage of a hotel's services (and room contents) using nothing more than an air of authority (Fake Doctor); a lure of big money for little work puts an unquestioning member of the public in a difficult position (Reshipping Scam); the Proposition Bet is that a coin can't be removed from beneath two balanced matches; the Cover The Spot fairground game is shown to be harder than it looks; and the team walk off with the personal belongings of a cafe's customers in less than 3 minutes, under the pretense of storing them in a cloakroom (Get Yer Coat).
11	37	"Episode 11"	8 October 2007
The hustlers dress up as security guards, turn up at a shop which is expecting its weekly cash takings to be collected, and walk off with the loot; pose as the legitimate owners of sunloungers and collect rental fees from holidaymakers on the beach; man a rigged fun fair stall where people try and throw a ball into a basket; and pretend to be strangers and secretly collude in order to win a poker tournament. The proposition bet is to move an egg from one glass to another without touching it and without moving the glasses.
12	38	"Episode 12"	8 October 2007
The gang hire some expensive jewelry for a fake photo shoot, which comes accompanied by security guards, and walk out with it via a hidden door behind a changing curtain; and con some holidaymakers into believing they need to pay a fine for speeding. The proposition bet involves throwing a glass of beer in someone's face. The episode ends with a recap of some of the cons from this series.

=== Series 5 (2008: Las Vegas) ===
No. overall	No. in series	Title	Original release date
1	39	"Episode 1"	12 February 2008
A couple are left with an immobilised car and without their luggage after a meeting with Alex, Paul and Jess (Wobbly Tyre); chip palming techniques are practised in Dealer Scams; a quick buck is made by Jess with her Change Raising hustle; the Proposition Bet is to retrieve a $50 note from water-filled, sealed glasses; and $80,000 worth of jewellery is stolen by a fake sheikh (Mystery Millionaire).
2	40	"Episode 2"	12 February 2008
Alex and Paul dress as valets to steal cars (Valet Distraction); Dealer Scams explains the Fake Chip Stack; Jess poses as the hotel inspector from hell so she can steal guests' belongings (The Fake Hotel Inspector); a Proposition Bet asks 3 questions about a watch; and the team hit a casino for thousands of dollars in a brazen scam without anyone suspecting a thing (Shoe Switch).
3	41	"Episode 3"	18 February 2008
The hustlers fake a heart condition to steal the pot in a poker game (The Big Bluff); the team go to extreme lengths to show how pickpockets operate (The Snip); Jess uses her feminine wiles to win some money in a game of pool (Pool Bet Puzzle); and con a pair of passers-by with a rigged game of dice (Street Dice). Dealer Scams looks at Flashing The Hole Card
4	42	"Episode 4"	25 February 2008
A superstore is relieved of some expensive merchandise through the ingenious use of an empty box (Superstore Swindle); the Proposition Bet is to retrieve a cork from inside a wine bottle; a pair of gamblers happily hand over their winnings in the Slot Machine Sting; Dealer Scams looks at the Delusion Shuffle; and a trio of wannabe hustlers are hustled themselves in the Backfiring Bet.
5	43	"Episode 5"	3 March 2008
A group of tourists are taken for a ride as their luggage is stolen (Shuttle Bus Swindle); the Proposition Bet is to throw and catch dice in a glass; Jess makes off with a slot player's coin bucket (The Bucket Blag); Dealer Scams demonstrates how to gain extra chips by using hidden moves; and Alex and Paul hustle a group of lads out of their drinking money using the Eddie Fields Card Trick
6	44	"Episode 6"	10 March 2008
A father and daughter are taken with bogus discount chips in The Twist; the Proposition Bet is to remove a glass from beneath a finely balanced match; the Umbrella Drop and Rat's Tale pickpocket techniques are demonstrated in Las Vegas Lifts; Paul wins easy money with more Pool Bet Puzzles; and false assumptions and sleight of hand allow Alex to rob a necklace in the Jewellery Store Steal.
7	45	"Episode 7"	17 March 2008
An ingenious convincer parts a man from his cash (despite a skeptical partner) as he buys The Fake Lottery Predictor; the Proposition Bet shows how the interleaved pages of books can beat muscle and win drinks; Dealer Scams looks at the Lay Stack; Pool Bet Puzzles include potting a coin into a shot glass; and Slot Thieves demonstrates how a $7 device called a monkey paw and some feminine charm can lead to big bucks on the slot machines.
8	46	"Episode 8"	24 March 2008
Alex pretends to be a blind man to cheat a casino (Blind Man's Bluff); Jess places her head through a business card in a Proposition Bet; Paul cons an unsuspecting couple into buying counterfeit casino chips (Discount Casino Chips); and Dealer Scams looks at the Bust-Out Dealer. Finally, a series overview looks at some of the scams pulled by the trio over the last eight programmes and runs through a checklist of lessons learned.

=== Series 6 (2008: High Stakes) ===
No. overall	No. in series	Title	Original release date
1	47	"Episode 1"	9 October 2008
An innocent bystander is conned into paying £2000 to stop the publication of paparazzi photos (The Sweetheart Scam). The team shows how easy it is to steal thousands of pounds of high value goods from right under the nose of a top hotel (The Inside Job). Matt Dawson is challenged to a round of golf (Celebrity Con Games).
2	48	"Episode 2"	16 October 2008
The boys demonstrate an ingenious method to sneak a marked pack of cards into a big money poker game (Lady Luck). The Pigeon Drop rips off some marks who think they've found a bag full of cash. Celebrity Con Games features Joanna Page in a cracker eating competition.
3	49	"Episode 3"	23 October 2008
Described as the "most common scam in the world", the 419 scam is demonstrated; Jess persuades someone to hand over his car keys as security while he does her a favour by taking what he thinks is £7000 of her money to a money exchange (The Unfair Exchange); and Jason King and Joel Ross are challenged to get four eggs into four glasses in one move (Celebrity Con Games).
4	50	"Episode 4"	30 October 2008
Alex poses as a talented but shy mathematician to convince people to invest in a Blackjack system; Jess steals some items from a shop by hiding them in a pregnancy dress (Bun in the Oven); and Alex beats a horse ridden by Tara Palmer-Tomkinson in a slalom race on foot (Celebrity Con Games).
5	51	"Episode 5"	6 November 2008
Paul reprises his role as a fake doctor to convince marks to bet at a fake betting shop run by the team (The Wire); Alex shoplifts by using a mark's open bag as a diversion (The False Alarm); and Dick and Dom challenge Jess to a game of strength (Celebrity Con Games).
6	52	"Episode 6"	13 November 2008
The team sets up their own art gallery to sell fake art by a famous artist (Picture Perfect); Alex and Paul demonstrate ways people can steal handbags (The Handbag Hustles); and Chico is challenged to a string game with balloons with the promise that Jess will have to take her clothes off if he succeeds (Celebrity Con Games).
7	53	"Episode 7"	20 November 2008
The hustlers trick two marks with an elaborate version of the Black Money Scam; Paul sets up a dodgy bureau de change (Currency Exchange Cons); and Steve Backley is challenged to a distance throwing challenge (Celebrity Con Games).
8	54	"Episode 8"	27 November 2008
Paul becomes Maurice the Psychic to scam unsuspecting believers into parting with their savings (The Psychic); Jess spends an evening as a barmaid to demonstrate some Cocktail Cons; and Scott Mills is challenged in a blindfold guessing game (Celebrity Con Games).
9	55	"Episode 9"	4 December 2008
The team pose as antiques experts and manage to sell a couple their own statuette back to them (Double Take); Alex and Paul successfully perform a variant of phishing, except in the real-life environment of a shopping-centre instead of online (Stake-out Scam); and Aldo Zilli is challenged to break an egg with a frying pan (Celebrity Con Games).
10	56	"Episode 10"	11 December 2008
A pair of marks are tricked into thinking they are buying the discs from the 2007 UK child benefit data scandal in the hope of gaining an award (The Go-between); a carefully constructed paper form ensures that companies still pay for a cancelled service (The Cancellation Con); and basketball player Steve Bucknall is challenged to a free throw competition with Alex (Celebrity Con Games).

=== Series 7 (2009: On Holiday) ===
No. overall	No. in series	Title	Original release date
1	57	"Episode 1"	21 May 2009
Jess convinces a mark to take a teddy to her nephew in Liverpool, but it contains a surprise (The Teddy Bear Scam); Andi Peters is challenged by Alex to tear apart a phonebook faster than he can (Celebrity Con Games); Paul convinces a couple he is their taxi driver, but walks off with their luggage while they wait (The Airport Pick Up); and Jess challenges two guys in a bar to get water out of a bottle faster than she can (Proposition Bets).
2	58	"Episode 2"	28 May 2009
Alex and Jess helpfully direct some holidaymakers to a local car mechanic (Paul), who relieves them of their keys (The Oil Slick Scam); Mark Foster is challenged by Paul to lift five gold bricks with one hand (Celebrity Con Games); Alex and Paul pose as security alarm technicians so they can later burgle a house (The Silent Alarm Sting); Alex demonstrates how to open a bottle with a piece of paper (Proposition Bets); and the team use a fake exchange rate website as a convincer to make a couple part with their money (The Currency Swindle).
3	59	"Episode 3"	4 June 2009
Alex demonstrates social compliance by posing as a police officer to take some tourists' passports (The Passport Cool-Out); Christian O'Connell is challenged by Alex to lift a table without touching it (Celebrity Con Games); the hustlers install fake car parking signs to get people to pay by text message (The Seaside Parking Swindle); Jess challenges some people in a bar to make a knot in a tie without letting go of the ends (Proposition Bets); and Alex clones swipe-card keys in a hotel to later walk off with guests' possessions (The Swipe).
4	60	"Episode 4"	11 June 2009
The team pay a cheque (which will bounce) to hire a boat, then ask for some of the money back in cash (The Boat Hire Scam); Angellica Bell is challenged by Jess to pick up a piece of paper placed on her feet while standing against a wall (Celebrity Con Games); Alex acts drunk in a bar in order to pick pockets (The Pushout); Paul challenges some people in a bar to stand a matchbox upright using one finger (Proposition Bets); and Alex demonstrates how wearing a high visibility jacket allows him to steal a hire car under the noses of the people who just hired it (Gone in 600 Seconds).
5	61	"Episode 5"	18 June 2009
Alex and Jess sell some carpets from a market, but out of sight wrap up a cheap mat instead (The Wrap Up); Alex challenges someone in a bar to place coins on a napkin without overlapping the edge (Proposition Bets); Paul takes money from tourists by pretending to provide taxis at a discount rate (The Black Cab Con); Toby Anstis is given a challenge by Paul involving frying pans (Celebrity Con Games); and the team advertise a fake nightclub and take the entrance fee from the people queuing up (The Club Night Con).
6	62	"Episode 6"	25 June 2009
Paul offers to take photos of tourists using their own camera, but then the camera gets swiped by Jess and Alex (The Helpful Stranger); Iwan Thomas is given a challenge by Paul involving drinks bottles (Celebrity Con Games); Alex poses as a hotel manager to get guests' key cards from them (The Hotel Room Rip-Off); Jess challenges someone in a bar to float a cork in the centre of a glass of water with it drifting to the edge (Proposition Bets); and the team offer a free locker service in a busy shopping centre, then take all the lockers away complete with their contents (The Lock-Up).
7	63	"Episode 7"	25 June 2009
Alex uses sleight of hand to swap keys for a left luggage locker to later steal its contents (The Bus Station Steal); Michael Underwood is challenged by Jess to knock over a golf tee on a pool table (Celebrity Con Games); Jess uses a pushy attitude to force 'lucky heather' on people in the street, but is actually picking their pockets (The Unlucky Heather Hustle); Paul bets that he can get over a hundred drops of wine out of a drained wine bottle (Proposition Bets); and Paul and Jess sell stolen theatre tickets to people in a bar (We Will We Will Rob You Scam).
8	64	"Episode 8"	9 July 2009
The team manufacture fake international phone cards that use premium rate phone lines (The Phone Home Hustle); Lisa Maffia is challenged to fold a large sheet of paper in half more than eight times (Celebrity Con Games); Paul poses as a car park attendant to sell bogus parking tickets to tourists (Superpass); Alex demonstrates how to put a balloon in a flame without it bursting (Proposition Bets); and Jess shows how giving a cheap gift to some people renting a holiday cottage helps her obtain £200 from them as a so-called deposit (The Gift Basket Con).
9	65	"Episode 9"	16 July 2009
Paul demonstrates how easy it is to switch a genuine bank note with a fake one (The Counterfeit Con); Alex rotates a glass twice in his hand without relaxing his grip (Proposition Bets); Jess steals the car from some people who help her change a tyre (The Good Samaritan Scam); Liz McClarnon is challenged to stand a bottle upright using a fork (Celebrity Con Games); and Alex and Jess never quite let marks win the big prizes in a fairground game (Lucky Tickets).
10	66	"Episode 10"	23 July 2009
Paul poses as a hotel bellboy to relieve some guests of their bags (The Hotel Check Out); Joel Beckett is challenged to knock a coin balanced on a pool ball outside a circle (Celebrity Con Games); Paul and Jess run a fairground game that you can never win (Razzle Dazzle); and Jess wins a bar bet using Möbius strips (Proposition Bets).

=== Series 8 (2010: Undercover) ===
No. overall	No. in series	Title	Original release date
1	67	"Episode 1"	14 January 2010
Alex and Jess steal expensive cars during test drives (Auto Trade Up); actor Danny Dyer is taught how to perform the pitch and switch swindle, selling misleading goods from the back of a van (Celebrity Hustle); Paul and Jess sell a bogus product to help people quit smoking on a market stall (Smoking Cure Scam); and Paul demonstrates how to balance an egg on the rim of a bottle (Proposition Bets).
2	68	"Episode 2"	21 January 2010
The hustlers run a bogus lottery at a charity fundraising dinner (Charity Banquet Scam); actress Emilia Fox performs the melon drop swindle, where she knocks into a passerby and accuses him of breaking a parcel she was carrying (Celebrity Hustle); Paul and Alex put up their own speed limit signs and pose as traffic cops (Speeding Fine Scam); Alex demonstrates how to flip a spoon into a mug using a fork (Proposition Bets); and Jess, who is using a wheelchair, distracts a helpful woman in a train station allowing her bags to be taken by Alex (One Good Turn).
3	69	"Episode 3"	28 January 2010
Jess distracts a woman in a café so that her bag can be stolen and her house broken into (The Decoy); model Caprice attempts to hand over counterfeit £20 notes to a shop (Celebrity Hustle); Alex dresses as a policeman and walks off with the wallets from people in a coffee shop (Coffee Fix); and Jess demonstrates how to get a bent bottle cap out of a bottle without touching it (Proposition Bets).
4	70	"Episode 4"	4 February 2010
Jess hides in a sofa delivered by Paul and Alex to an antiques shop, then steals items from the shop while the owner is out (Surprise Package); model Danielle Lloyd is shown how to steal a handbag in a café (Celebrity Hustle); Jess poses as a charity worker in a busy shopping area to distract people while Paul picks from their bags (Give and Take); Alex demonstrates how to retrieve a £20 note from under a bottle without touching the bottle (Proposition Bets); and Jess pretends to have found a lost dog in order to scam the dog's owner (Missing Dog Scam).
5	71	"Episode 5"	4 February 2010
The gang sell pirate DVDs in a pub then fake a police raid and give on the spot fines to the people that bought them (DVD Extras); TV and radio presenter Iain Lee helps Paul and Alex burgle a house by pretending to be water engineers (Celebrity Hustle); the hustlers hire some people to be secret shoppers and buy expensive goods, but reimburse them with fake cheques (Mystery Shopper); and Alex relieves airport passengers of their bags by providing a fake check-in service (Red Cap Scam).
6	72	"Episode 6"	11 February 2010
The hustlers use a wire transfer service to swindle two potential flat renters out of their deposit (The Interception); tennis player Greg Rusedski poses as a security guard and takes the earnings from a jewellery shop (Celebrity Hustle); Paul demonstrates how to lift two glasses with one balloon (Proposition Bet); and Paul and Alex use a variety of techniques to persuade people to buy expensive fake healing stones from a market stall (The Alternative).
7	73	"Episode 7"	11 February 2010
Jess sends an SMS message from a mark's phone to his wife to convince her to hand over some car keys to Paul and Alex, posing as mechanics (The Message); model Lucy Pinder switches a laptop with a block of wood during the sale of the former (Celebrity Hustle); Jess persuades a group in a bar to lend her their bar tab card, which she then uses to buy expensive bottles of champagne (The Bar Bluff); and Jess and Alex pose as Inland Revenue officers to clear out a shop's till in a fake inspection (The Till Inspector).
8	74	"Episode 8"	18 February 2010
Jess sells fake exclusive VIP access to a nightclub (The Stretch); presenter Emma Willis pays only £8 for a £60 meal by swapping her bill with another diner's (Celebrity Hustle); Paul and Alex sell some fake anti-camera spray for car number plates (The Cover Up); and Paul and Alex rig a games of craps using powerful magnets to influence loaded dice (The Tat).
9	75	"Episode 9"	25 February 2010
Paul and Alex steal cash from people who try to use an ATM by posing as bank security staff (The Withdrawal Method); musician Huey Morgan takes part in a poker game rigged in his favour (Celebrity Hustle); Jess poses as a waitress and uses a fake chip-and-PIN machine to record card details (The Fake Waiter); Alex lifts a bottle off a table using just his thumbs (Proposition Bets); and Paul and Jess set up stall outside a train station and sell tickets for the Science Museum to tourists who don't realise that admission is free (The Tourist Trap).
10	76	"Episode 10"	25 February 2010
Alex swaps a restaurant's chip-and-PIN machine with one of his own to steal customer's card details (The Pass); presenter Rick Edwards puts an "out of order" sign on a bank night drop box and acts as a security guard to take the money from local businesses (Celebrity Hustle); Alex poses as a window cleaner to take householder's money while the real window cleaners don't get paid (The Window Cleaner Scam); and Paul wins a proposition bet involving a torn paper napkin (Proposition Bets). The episode ends with a review of the eighth season.

=== Series 9 (2010: Celebrity Scammers) ===
No. overall	No. in series	Title	Original release date
1	77	"Episode 1"	29 July 2010
Singer Matt Willis helps Paul and Alex rob a jewellery store using a variety of disguises and deceptions (The Jewellery Store Heist); Jess demonstrates how to make two lines of four coins using six coins in total (Proposition Bets); and a laptop user is asked to pay £200 to stop his files being deleted by a piece of malware planted by Jess (The High Speed Hijack).
2	78	"Episode 2"	29 July 2010
Dancer Brendan Cole joins with a betting scam for an unlicensed boxing match (The Knockout); Paul demonstrates how to get many more drops of wine out of a seemingly empty bottle (Proposition Bets); and a Mercedes is stolen from a second-hand car dealership with the help of some fake keys (The Car Dealer).
3	79	"Episode 3"	5 August 2010
Presenter Zöe Salmon helps pull off a scam that rips off both the buyers and sellers of a car by posing as Department of Transport staff (The Double Whammy); Alex lifts a glass using a balloon (Proposition Bets); and Jess uses details gained from recycled mobile phones to give fake psychic readings (The Phony Psychic Scam).
4	80	"Episode 4"	12 August 2010
The hustlers set up a fake auction with the help of presenter Lisa Snowdon (The Art Attack); Jess demonstrates a bet involving shot glasses of whisky and water (Proposition Bets); and Paul and Alex pose as clerks of the court to persuade a businessman to pay a fine for ignoring non-existent letters summoning him for jury duty (The Jury Duty Scam).
5	81	"Episode 5"	19 August 2010
Singer Antony Costa poses as a dodgy import drinks wholesaler, and the rest of the hustlers as Trading Standards staff, to rip off some buyers in a fake sting operation (Under the Influence); Alex bets he can blow over a bottle without touching it (Proposition Bets); and the hustlers cut satellite cables and then ask for credit card details to reconnect the users (The Satellite Switchoff).
6	82	"Episode 6"	26 August 2010
Singer Kelli Young poses as a cleaner in a scam involving an expensive painting ruined in a photoshoot (Done and Dusted); Jess demonstrates a proposition bet involving coins laid out in the shape of a triangle (Proposition Bets); and the hustlers promise tax refunds in exchange for identity and bank details (The Tax Man Scam).
7	83	"Episode 7"	3 September 2010
Actor Ben Hull helps in a scam involving fake car dealers and the government scrappage scheme (The Scrap Trap); Alex uses suction to invert a matchbox (Proposition Bets); and the hustlers add a hidden scanner to a paper shredder, allowing them to copy confidential documents just before they are destroyed (The Shred).
8	84	"Episode 8"	10 September 2010
Singer Jonathan Ansell helps persuade some marks that to take part in a fake audition, where they need to pay for a work visa (The Audition); Paul uses eleven matches to make just nine (Proposition Bets); and the hustlers set up a fake fraud hotline and use it to gather credit card details, plus show how the right equipment can be used to eavesdrop on digital cordless telephones (The Telecoms Con).
9	85	"Episode 9"	17 September 2010
Actress Abi Titmuss poses as a lawyer to help persuade some marks that they have inherited a large amount of money (The Inheritance); Paul demonstrates a proposition bet involving a matchbox (Proposition Bets); and Alex and Paul pose as engineers to install a fake security system in a student house, but are really casing the joint and copying the keys so that they can later burgle it (The Scareware Scam).
10	86	"Episode 10"	17 September 2010
Actor Rob Kazinsky plays the part of a chauffeur to help part some marks from their cash while delivering some jewellery (The Diamond Geezer); Alex demonstrates a proposition bet involving a glass, credit card, matchbox and coin (Proposition Bets); and Jess allows customers to try on "eternity bracelets" which then lock shut and have to be paid for (The Together Forever Scam). The episode ends with some outtakes from the series..

=== Series 10 (2011: New Recruits) ===
No. overall	No. in series	Title	Original release date
1	87	"Episode 1"	5 September 2011
Actress Roxanne Pallett goes undercover to help the hustlers rob a watch store, while new recruits Polly and Jazz scam a passer-by using a faulty removal box.
2	88	"Episode 2"	12 September 2011
Pop Idol's Gareth Gates plays the role of a stock market trader in an amazing business scam, while new recruits Polly and Jazz join to con a businessman out of his possessions.
3	89	"Episode 3"	19 September 2011
Former EastEnders wheeler dealer, Joe Swash goes undercover, posing as a member of a film crew in a scam to relieve a TV rentals shop of a shipment of flatscreen TVs.
4	90	"Episode 4"	26 September 2011
Dance act Diversity's front man Ashley Banjo goes undercover in an art scam.
5	91	"Episode 5"	3 October 2011
Crimewatch presenter Rav Wilding is a guest hustler in a scam involving gold chains.
6	92	"Episode 6"	10 October 2011
Hollyoaks actress Jennifer Metcalfe goes undercover in a lottery syndicate scam.
7	93	"Episode 7"	24 October 2011
Hollyoaks actress Sarah Jayne Dunn goes undercover in a scam involving luxury watches.
8	94	"Episode 8"	31 October 2011
Colin Murray poses as poker magazine journalist, helping the hustlers pull off a scam.
9	95	"Episode 9"	31 October 2011
Colin and Justin swap decorating for scamming as they go undercover as wealthy landowners.
10	96	"Episode 10"	20 January 2012
Actress Adele Silva helps the hustlers in a scam which involves the Forth Bridge.

=== Series 11 (2012: Celebrity Chancers) ===
No. overall	No. in series	Title	Original release date
1	97	"Episode 1"	27 January 2012
Ex-Boyzone member Shane Lynch goes undercover as a tramp to help the hustlers pull off a devious heist.
2	98	"Episode 2"	3 February 2012
TOWIE star Sam Faiers goes undercover as a bitter ex-wife to help the Hustlers con a mark.
3	99	"Episode 3"	10 February 2012
BBC Radio 1 DJ Nihal helps con two unsuspecting marks into buying a bronze sculpture.
4	100	"Episode 4"	17 February 2012
TV presenter Laura Hamilton joins the Hustlers this week to help them pull off a devious scam. An unsuspecting mark is accused of stealing cash from Jess and it all gets very messy when heavyweight bosses Alex and Paul get involved.
5	101	"Episode 5"	24 February 2012
Shameless and EastEnders star Jody Latham helps the Hustlers pull off a gambling scam.
6	102	"Episode 6"	2 March 2012
Hollyoaks star Gemma Atkinson helps pull off a real-life game of Grand Theft Auto.
7	103	"Episode 7"	9 March 2012
Ex-Hollyoaks star Marcus Patrick joins the team in a con involving some buried treasure.
8	104	"Episode 8"	16 March 2012
Ex-Coronation Street star Lucien Laviscount joins the team for an antiques-based con.
9	105	"Episode 9"	23 March 2012
Former Blue Peter Presenter Konnie Huq joins the Hustlers in a scam involving time-share deals on a Scottish castle.
10	106	"Busted"	30 March 2012
Even the very best con artists make mistakes sometimes and this episode exposes what happens when scams go wrong. Guest hustlers, boxer Joe Calzaghe, and EastEnders star, Sid Owen, get involved in a crazy con set in the world of vintage stamps that turns out to be the strangest scam in the history of the Real Hustle.

=== Specials ===
Title	Original release date
"The 12 Scams of Christmas"	17 December 2006
A one-hour extended episode with new Christmas themed scams. Setting up a bogus till in a department store, A Bag of 4 designer perfumes for £20 – but are they what they seem?, The big toy – you order a games console for Christmas but do you get your money's worth?, Stealing luggage at the airport by distraction techniques, Three proposition bets – moving an olive without touching it, balancing coins on edge, and balancing coins on a glass, Two charity scams – Bad Santas collecting for charity and organising a charity raffle, Putting a shop's money in a Christmas card, short changing the bar, leaving the sealed card as security while leaving to get more change, eventually the barman opens the card to find the £20 note has gone., Free giftwrapping service – but what's in the box?, Getting a locksmith to open someone else's house and Erasing ink on a cheque
"Winter Special"	17 February 2007
In a one-hour extended episode with some new and some repeated material from The 12 Scams of Christmas special. The new cons are: selling fake jackets in a motorway service station, using confidence techniques and sleight of hand to steal the takings from a pub, using a sharp knife to take belongings from bags, and taking other people's luggage from an airport carousel.
"Don't Miss A Trick"	25 August 2008
Although not billed as an episode of The Real Hustle, the similar show Don't Miss a Trick was written by Alex and Paul, featured Jess, and was made by Objective Production in a similar style. It also featured Pete Firman as a special guest who performed his tricks separately from Alex, Paul and Jess, and had linking material presented by Kate Thornton. Unlike The Real Hustle, Don't Miss a Trick was aimed at a family audience and was broadcast on the mainstream channel BBC One. Instead of scams the show demonstrated tricks and illusions that viewers could try on their own friends. Air date: 25 August 2008 (60 minute version), 27 March 2009 (30 minute version).
"The World's Greatest Bar Bets"	24 November 2008
Easy-to-learn propositions and challenges to astound, impress and win you drink after drink. Alex Jess and Paul Wilson demonstrate a selection of startling and astonishing bar bets and challenges. The experts perform these proposition bets in a real bar, up against real punters. Then, in close-up, with slow motion sequences, they explain just how it's done – Perfect for you to practice and cash-in by bamboozling your mates on your next night out!
"Best Ever Cons"	18 December 2008
The top 10 scams from the first five series.
"The Real Hustle Around the World"	18 July 2010
A look at the six international versions of The Real Hustle and how they compare to the British version. Robert Webb narrated, while Paul, Alex and Jess also provided contributions.
