= Steve Whatley =

British actor and television presenter

- Steve Whatley c.2005
- Born: 11 July 1959; Devon, UK
- Died: 7 November 2005 (aged 46); Hertfordshire, UK
- Occupations: Theatre actor, consumer expert & television presenter

Steven Rae "Steve" Whatley (11 July 1959 – 7 November 2005) known as 'Gadget Man', 'Mr Diamonique', 'Whatters' and 'Mr Zhuzh!', was a British theatre actor, consumer expert, journalist, and television presenter.

== Early career ==
Whatley spent seven years acting in London's West End Theatre.

He soon later Britain's first male grooming expert with his own male grooming page in She Magazine. This progressed to include, style, grooming and Agony Uncle on the initial team of FHM and opened the door to BBC Pebble Mill. Then followed 12 years for Whatley as resident consumer reporter with Richard and Judy (Richard Madeley and Judy Finnigan) on ITV's daytime show This Morning, discussing consumer issues and presenting numerous gadgets.

== QVC ==
In 1993, Steve Whatley joined QVC along with fellow television presenters Paul Lavers, and Julia Roberts prior to 'the UK's first shopping channel' launching on 1 October of that year.

His presenting style on QVC was regarded as 'camp' and humorous. He is most remembered for the "Diamonique" jewellery shows he presented, later gaining the nickname 'Mr Diamonique'.

Behind the camera, Whatley was serious about the products he sold and the shows he presented. This 'perfectionism' sometimes led to disagreements with production staff about the best way to sell the item.

In September 1997, after 4 years working at the channel, Whatley left QVC after what was seen as an excessive discussion of Diana, Princess of Wales in his presenting of a "Today's Special Value" item of jewellery the day before her funeral. The "Today's Special Value" item closely resembled Diana, Princess of Wales' diamond and sapphire engagement ring. QVC had ordered there to be no mention of Diana, Princess of Wales in relation to the ring, but Whatley decided otherwise and described the ring as "a fine tribute to a loved princess". There had also been a 'flare-up' of issues regarding his relationship with other members of staff in the months leading up to Whatley's departure from the channel.

== A return to earlier projects ==
From late 1997, Whatley appeared in various pantomime productions and plays. He also returned to presenting consumer slots on ITV's This Morning, and up until 2000, featured numerous times on BBC's Watchdog, Anglia TV's Home Malone, Granada Sky's The DIY Show and on the popular Five programme Open House with Gloria Hunniford.

== Ideal World ==
In 2000, Steve Whatley joined Ideal World, a shopping channel owned by Ideal Direct Shopping Plc, with Debbie Flint and Paul Lavers, whom he had previously worked with at QVC. The channel launched on 17 April 2000, and has since been a major rival of QVC. Whatley also presented "Disney Memorabilia" programmes and was a fan and collector of Mickey Mouse memorabilia himself.

Steve Whatley & Delia early 2000s

A "HAVE YOURSELF A WHATTERS' CRAZEEE CHRISTMAS" Christmas card

Whatley owned three Weimaraner dogs and they were often seen on his shows 'consumer testing' various pet products. The youngest of the three dogs was named Delia after he had asked the Ideal World audience to send name suggestions into the channel. The name "Delia" is an anagram of the word "ideal". His eldest dog Harry mainly 'co-presented' on "Magnet Therapy" shows and his third dog Oscar was seen numerous times.

On 6 March 2001, the Ideal World premises, including the studios and warehouse, were devastated by an unexplained fire. Despite this, Whatley continued to work at Ideal World and helped to rebuild the channel. Ideal World was back broadcasting within weeks off the air. Until the new studios and warehouse were completed, Whatley and the team of presenters and production staff worked in temporary studios constructed out of prefabricated units that were erected on the Newark Road, Fengate site.

Steve Whatley constantly had arguments with the technical and production crew at Ideal World. His way of presenting was very different to how others presented. He always thought he was right.

On Christmas Eve 2004, after 4 years at Ideal World, Whatley left the channel to pursue other projects. These included helping to launch Harrods TV and plans to return to his theatre work.

== Indecent assault charges ==
Steve Whatley at Peterborough Magistrates' Court late 2002

On 18 December 2002, whilst still working at Ideal World, Whatley appeared at Peterborough Magistrates' Court, charged with indecently assaulting a fellow employee four times over a 17-month period during 2000 and 2001. He was accused of groping a female employee three times and once licking her face.

He pleaded "not guilty" to all four counts of indecent assault. The case was adjourned to Peterborough Crown Court until 3 February 2003, and Whatley was granted bail.

On 11 July 2003, after a four-day trial, the jurors unanimously cleared Whatley of three charges of indecent assault, but were unable to reach a decision on the fourth 'face licking' charge.

The Crown Prosecution Service had a week to decide if it would seek a retrial on the remaining charge, but no further action was taken as it was known that Whatley licked the faces of many of his co-workers as part of a joke amongst Ideal World staff.

== "Steve Whatley's Zhuzh!" ==
Whatley later created and founded the "Steve Whatley's Zhuzh!" brand of tanning products and appeared numerous times on Ideal World as a guest seller. He also continued to write blogs, answering questions about "Zhuzh!" on the "Zhuzh!" website into late 2005.

== Death ==
Whatley died on 7 November 2005, aged 46.

An inquest into his death held at Hatfield, Hertfordshire in January 2006, ruled that he had died by suicide by inhaling fumes whilst ill with depression following the breakdown of his marriage five months earlier.
