= Keep Your Hair On (TV Series) =

2006 British children's gameshow

- Genre: Gameshow
- Presented by: Reggie Yates, Gina Yashere, Anne Foy, Louisa Lytton
- Country of origin: United Kingdom
- Original language: English
- No. of series: 1
- No. of episodes: 10

Production
- Running time: 14 minutes
- Production company: Brighter Pictures

Original release
- Network: CBBC; BBC One
- Release: 6 November – 17 November 2006

Related
- Celebrity Scissorhands

Keep Your Hair On is a British children's television series gameshow that aired on CBBC that was broadcast from November 6th-17th in 2006, which featured a total of 10 episodes spanning over two weeks. The aim of the show was to raise money for BBC Children in Need. The show was presented by Reggie Yates for all 10 episodes and also featured guest presenters Gina Yashere, Anne Foy and Louisa Lytton. Each episode aired for roughly 14 minutes on the CBBC programme stand on BBC One.

== Format ==
In the programme three classmates each battle it out to avoid receiving the worst haircut of their life in a series of challenges each tasked with testing their mental and physical skills. In total there was three different rounds, the first round involved sticking hair or cheese puffs using a face mask to celebrity baldies, whoever completes the task first receives two hairnets (which should they be unlucky in the final will allow them to avoid receiving some of what the contestant deems the worst haircuts), second place will receive one hairnet and last place will not receive a hairnet at all. Unfortunately, not a lot is known about Round 2. Between each of the rounds the presenters would often talk with the contestants teachers and friends, asking them questions like what their friends and students would react like receiving a haircut? And airing clips about what kind of work BBC Children in Need are doing. In the final round named “Beat The Buzz” the three contestants will each line up, whoever lost the previous round will be holding a cardboard cutout of hair clippers and only once the contestant gets the question right (often related to hair), will they be able to pass it over to their classmate. The losing child who is holding the clippers at the end of 1 minute will be unfortunate one receiving the haircut. A possible eight haircuts were on offer on the “Celebrity Baldies Board” each of which were deemed pretty horrific. In the first week all the contestants were boys and some of the haircuts included the Mullet (haircut), the Monk Tonsure, the Slaphead (all the hair is completely shaved off), the Clown, the Comb over, the Reversehawk (like the Mohawk but shaved down the middle) and the Bowl cut. In the second week all the contestants were girls and included haircuts like the Punk (hair is cut short with hair dyed with multiple colours and hair gel applied for spiky effect), the Wonky (hair is cut unevenly), the Random (hair is cut with patches shaved off in a random way) and the Shave Shocker (head is shaved except the ponytail). The haircut chosen would be selected from a lottery machine with a number written on the ball to coincide with the number on the celebrity baldie board. As the programme ends you see “Aaron the barber” giving the child the haircut as the credits roll and their classmates look on in horror.
