= Celebrity Scissorhands =

- Genre: Reality
- Presented by: Alex Zane (2006); George Lamb (2007–08)
- Country of origin: United Kingdom
- Original language: English
- No. of series: 3

Production
- Running time: 60 minutes
- Production company: Brighter Pictures

Original release
- Network: BBC Three; BBC One
- Release: 5 November 2006 – 14 November 2008

Related
- The Salon; Keep Your Hair On (TV Series)

Celebrity Scissorhands is a reality television show that is part of the BBC's Children in Need charity campaign, in which celebrities attempt to cut people's hair to raise money for the campaign while trained and watched by professional hairdresser Lee Stafford.

== Series 1 (2006) ==
The first series began airing on BBC Three on 5 November 2006; BBC One began airing it in late night on 12 November; and it ran for two weeks, culminating on 17 November, the annual Children in Need night, when it aired as part of the Children in Need telethon on BBC One. It was hosted by Alex Zane. The celebrities were trained by Lee Stafford, a leading hairdresser, at a hair and beauty academy set up at the BBC Television Centre in London which was opened to the public on 4 November. BBC stars and ordinary people had makeovers performed at the academy.

On 17 November, five of the celebrities, chosen by a public telephone and text message vote, appeared live in the salon during the Children in Need show. These were Steve Strange, Scott Mills, Darren Day, Michelle Dewberry and Ortis Deley.

=== Contestants ===
Series 1 contestants were:

Celebrity	Occupation
Sarah Cawood	Television presenter
Darren Day	Actor, singer, & presenter
Ortis Deley	The Gadget Show presenter
Michelle Dewberry	The Apprentice winner
Richard Fairbrass	Right Said Fred singer
Scott Mills	BBC Radio 1 presenter
Emma Samms	Actress
Rowetta Satchell	The X Factor contestant
Steve Strange (Winner)	Visage singer

== Series 2 (2007) ==
The second series was shown on BBC Three from 25 October to 15 November 2007. Lee Stafford returned as manager of the salon and first series winner Steve Strange also returned as assistant manager. George Lamb presented the show. Kelly Condron voiced the series.

=== Contestants ===
Series contestants (in alphabetical order):

Celebrity	Occupation
Aled Haydn Jones (Runner up)	The Chris Moyles Show producer
Ben Nicholas	Neighbours actor
Brandon Block	DJ
Carley Stenson	Hollyoaks actress
Lil' Chris	Singer-songwriter
Javine Hylton	Singer
Ninia Benjamin (Winner)	Comedian
Tamara Beckwith	Writer & socialite
Warwick Davis	Actor

== Series 3 (2008) ==
The third series began on 26 October 2008, airing on BBC Three in aid of Children in Need.

Lee Stafford returned as manager of the salon, with series 1 winner Steve Strange back as assistant manager and George Lamb again hosting the show.

In early November, it was announced that the 3 people that would be going through to the final, that went on to take place on 14 November on BBC One, were Jeff, Sabrina and Scott.

The winner was Sabrina and the runner-up was Jeff.

=== Contestants ===
Contestants (in alphabetical order) are:

Celebrity	Occupation
Chris Perry-Metcalf	Grange Hill actor
Jay Sean* (Withdrew)	Singer-songwriter
Jeff Leach (Runner Up)	Television presenter
Jessica-Jane Clement	Actress & television presenter
Kym Mazelle	Singer-songwriter
Lee MacDonald (referred to as 'Zammo')	Former Grange Hill actor
Lucinda Ledgerwood	The Apprentice contestant
Sabrina Washington (Winner)	Former Mis-Teeq singer
Scott Robinson	Former Five singer
Shana Swash	EastEnders actress
Stedman Pearson	Five Star singer

- *Jay Sean was confirmed for the series but withdrew before it was aired for unconfirmed reasons
