= Jackson Wray =

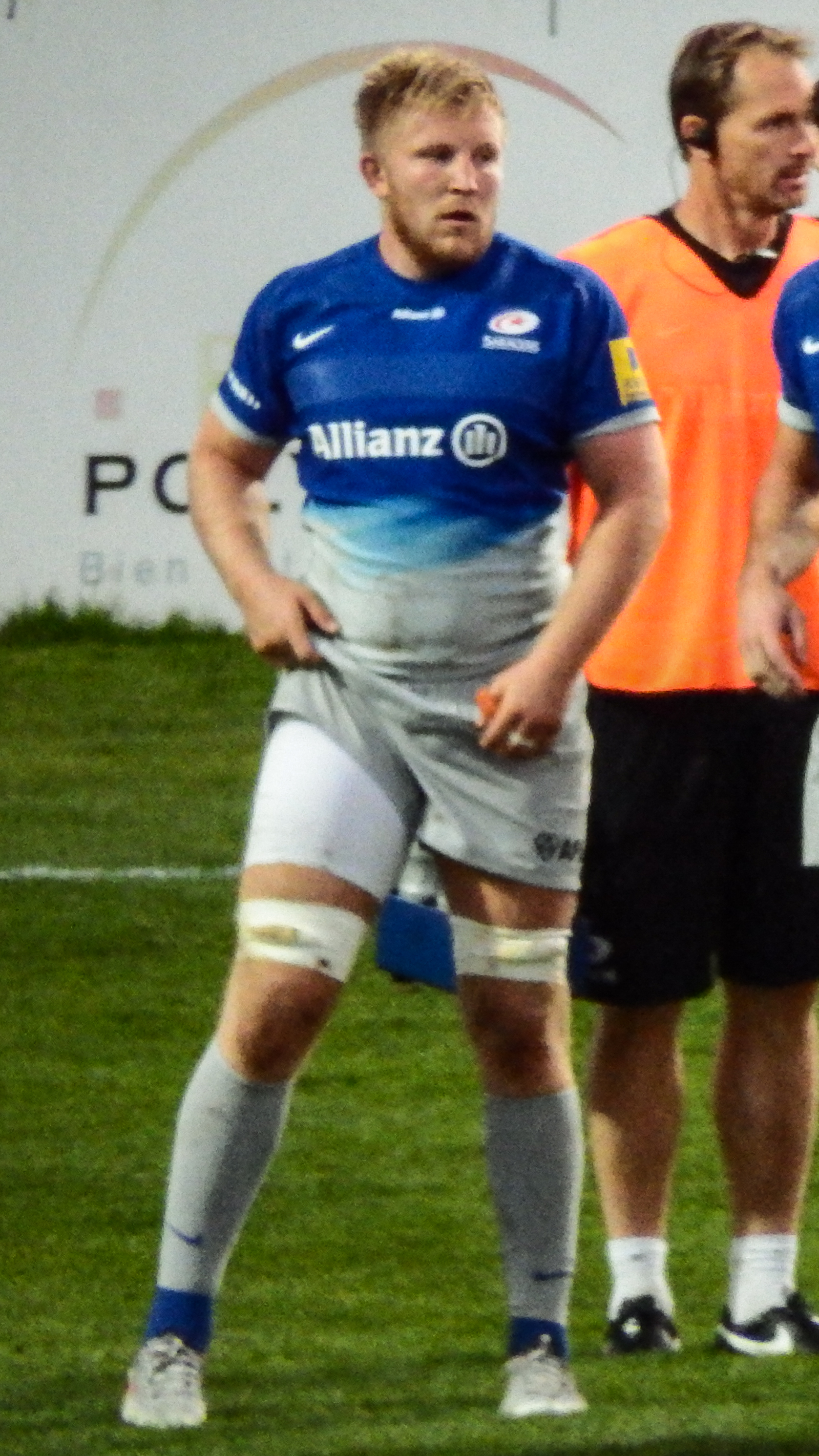
- Wray in 2015
- Born: Jackson Moore Wray; 10 November 1990 (age 36) Sunderland, Tyne and Wear, England
- Height: 1.88 m (6 ft 2 in)
- Weight: 112 kg (17 st 9 lb)
- School: The King John School
- University: Herts (class of '11)

Rugby union career
- Position(s): Flanker, Number 8
Senior career
Years	Team	Apps	(Points)
2009–2023	Saracens	309	(135)
2010–2011	→Bedford Blues (loan)	14	(5)
- Correct as of 27 May 2023
International career
Years	Team	Apps	(Points)
2010	England U20	9	(0)

Jackson Moore Wray (born 10 November 1990) is an English former rugby union player. A back row, he spent his whole career with Saracens and represented England at youth level.

== Career ==
Born in Sunderland, Tyne and Wear, his family moved to Essex where he grew up and spent his childhood and teenage years. He started playing rugby at The King John School before joining Westcliff RFC at the age of fourteen. Two years later he joined Barking RFC and then moved on to become part of Saracens Academy.

In October 2008, Wray made his Sarries debut during a defeat against Scarlets in the Anglo-Welsh Cup. His performances benefited from a spell on loan with Bedford Blues during the 2009–10 RFU Championship campaign. Wray really burst on to the scene in the first half of the 2010–11 season, recording a man of the match performance in front of the TV cameras against Bath at the Recreation Ground before becoming a mainstay in Mark McCall's side from 2013–14 season onwards.

Wray represented England at under-16 level. He played for the England U20 side that were runners up during the 2010 Six Nations Under 20s Championship and later that year was a member of the squad that finished fourth at the 2010 IRB Junior World Championship. In August 2014, Wray was included in a training camp with the senior England squad however he remained uncapped.

During his time at Saracens, Wray won five Premiership titles in 2015, 2016, 2018, 2019 and 2023, featuring in all five finals. He was named in the Premiership Rugby Team of the Year at the end of the 2016–17 season. Wray also helped Saracens win the European Champions Cup in 2016, 2017 and 2019.

In July 2020, it was announced that Wray had signed a contract extension with Saracens until the end of the 2022–23 season. In May 2023, it was confirmed Jackson Wray would retire at the end of the 2022–2023 season. His last game for the club saw them defeat Sale Sharks to become league champions again. In total Wray made over 300 appearances for Saracens.

== Honours ==
Saracens

- 3× European Rugby Champions Cup winner: 2015–16, 2016–17, 2018–19
- 5× Premiership Rugby winner: 2014–15, 2015–16, 2017–18, 2018–19, 2022–23
- 1× RFU Championship winner: 2020–21

Individual

- 1× Premiership Rugby Team of the Season: 2016–17
