= The King John School =

Location
- Shipwright's Drive; Thundersley, Essex, SS7 1RQ; England; 51.5556°N 0.5931°E

Information
- Type: Academy
- Established: 1949
- Local authority: Essex
- Specialist: Maths and Computing
- Department for Education URN: 136577 Tables
- Ofsted: Reports
- Chair: Stewart Taylor
- Headteacher: Daniel Steel
- Gender: Mixed
- Age: 11 to 18 (inc. Sixth Form)
- Enrolment: 2052 (February 2019)
- Colours: Red and Black
- Website: http://www.thekjs.essex.sch.uk/

The King John School, often abbreviated to King John, is a secondary academy school with a sixth form in Thundersley, Essex, England. It is named after King John of England (1166–1216). The main school building was opened in 1949. As of November 2023, the school has an enrolment of 2052 students, operating over its recommended capacity of 2000 students.

== History ==
Construction of the school was started in 1938, but suspended for the duration of the war and restarted in 1948. The south wing was opened in May 1949 as Benfleet Secondary Modern, and a new wing with laboratory, art room, classrooms as well as a canteen was opened in 1951. The school took pupils from primary schools in Hadleigh, Thundersley, South Benfleet and New Thundersley.

Two days before the school was to be officially opened in 1953, it was used as a shelter station after the Canvey Island flood tragedy, a gesture that led to the headmaster, Albert Evans, who was also the district emergency meals officer at the time of the emergency, being awarded the MBE in the new Queen's coronation honours.

The official name of the school had still not been settled, but the association of the area with King John had seen the eventual name mooted, and during the flood it was thus referred to as the Palace. The new name became official in 1957, when it was renamed as King John Secondary Modern School.

There were 1100 pupils and it became a comprehensive school and began to offer GCE 'O' levels from 1967 with a sixth form established from 1995. In April 2011 it converted to a secondary academy school specialising in mathematics and computing. At the end of 2017 it became part of the Zenith Multi Academy Trust.

== Notable teachers ==
- Buddy Edelen, an American marathon runner, taught history at the school in the 1960s.
- Wilko Johnson, the guitarist in Dr. Feelgood (band) and Ian Dury and The Blockheads, then addressed as Mr. Wilkinson, briefly taught English in 1973.

== Notable students ==
- Jasmine Armfield - Actress
- Max Crumpton - Rugby union player
- Ted Smith - Football player
- Lee Stafford - Celebrity hairdresser
- Jackson Wray - Rugby union player
- Jessica Judd - GB Olympian Long Distance Runner

== The school and grounds ==
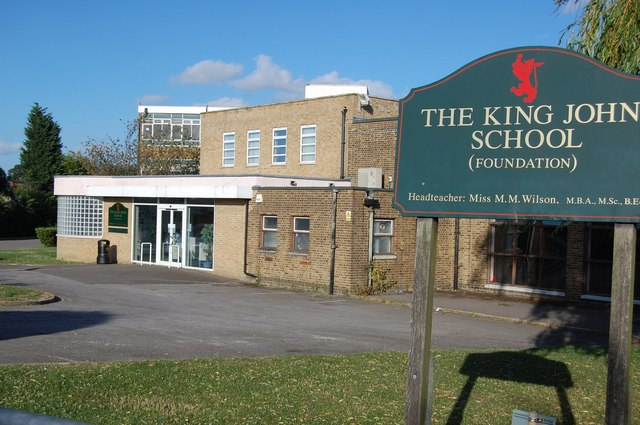

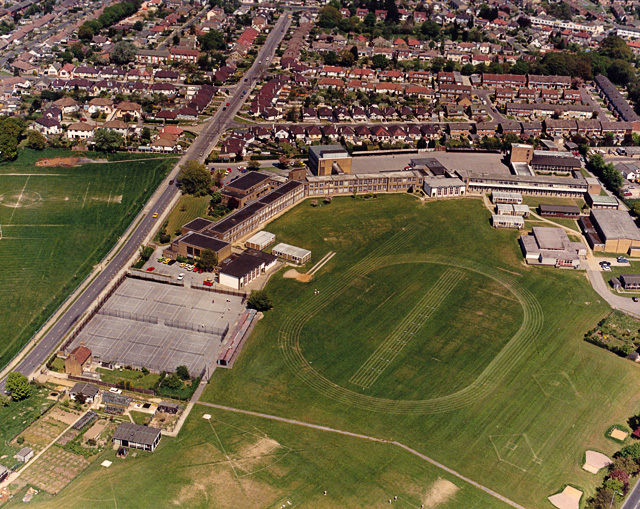

== Bibliography ==
- Grieve, Hilda Elizabeth Poole (1959). The Great Tide: The Story of the 1953 Flood Disaster in Essex. County Council of Essex. ISBN 978-0-598-19817-4.
- Islip, Katy (23 July 2010). "Ten staff lose jobs as Staffords salon shuts". Echo.
- Phillips, Chris (7 June 2019). "King John School's pride after Jackson Wray wins again with Saracens". Echo.
- Phillips, Chris (17 October 2013). "School proud of young Lion Ted Smith". Echo.
- Rust, Danny (5 January 2017). "Ex-King John student enjoying Premiership". Echo.
