= Real Hustle =

American television program

Real Hustle is an American television program that aired on truTV in 2008. The show demonstrates confidence tricks and other scams performed on members of the public. The show was cancelled after 1 season.

The program shows ways in which people can be scammed out of substantial amounts of money with relatively little effort. The ultimate goal is to educate the viewer on various scams. Victims, called marks, are informed of the tricks afterwards. It is the American version of the BBC program of a slightly different name, The Real Hustle.
