= The Body Shocking Show =

British TV series

- Genre: Factual
- Written by: Paul Garner
- Directed by: Jill Cumberbatch
- Presented by: Jessica-Jane Clement; Pete Firman
- Narrated by: Elaine Davidson
- Country of origin: United Kingdom
- Original language: English
- No. of series: 1
- No. of episodes: 8

Production
- Executive producer: Juliet Rice
- Producer: Nicky Shales
- Editor: Ben Charlesworth; Shane McCormack
- Running time: 30 minutes
- Production company: Twofour

Original release
- Network: E4
- Release: 14 March – 2 May 2013

The Body Shocking Show is a factual series shown on E4 with the first episode being aired on 14 March 2013 at 10pm.

== Episodes ==
| No. | Title | Directed by | Written by | Original release date | UK viewers |
|---|---|---|---|---|---|
| 1 | "Episode 1" | Jill Cumberbatch | Paul Garner | 14 March 2013 | Less than 526,000 |
Pete and Jessica-Jane meet Tatyana Kozhevnikova, who demonstrates why she has the world's strongest vagina, and a woman who prefers her own breast milk in a cup of tea.
| 2 | "Episode 2" | Jill Cumberbatch | Paul Garner | 21 March 2013 | Less than 635,000 |
Pete and Jessica-Jane take a peek at some of the world's most mammoth mammaries, while Pete Burns witnesses a man getting sliced in the name of art. The Guinness World Record holder for the most piercings is in the studio. The show goes bottoms up at a bum clinic.
| 3 | "Episode 3" | Jill Cumberbatch | Paul Garner | 28 March 2013 | N/A |
The show reveals some of the longest nails in the world. Pete Burns witnesses a man receive an intimate and very painful piercing. There's also a man who loves to get walked all over, and another who has super stretchy skin.
| 4 | "Episode 4" | Jill Cumberbatch | Paul Garner | 4 April 2013 | Less than 551,000 |
In this edition, Pete Firman and Jessica-Jane Clement are joined by mini megastar Verne Troyer as he investigates the bizarre practice of squashing. There's a look at some of the most dangerous body piercings in the world, a hair-raising demonstration of strength and an exploration of the world of sex robots.
| 5 | "Episode 5" | Jill Cumberbatch | Paul Garner | 11 April 2013 | Less than 716,000 |
Mini megastar Verne Troyer freaks out at a freak show, and we meet a woman who likes a tussle with her gigantic muscles. Plus a look at the art of branding, and a studio guest demonstrates how many swords he can swallow.
| 6 | "Episode 6" | Jill Cumberbatch | Paul Garner | 18 April 2013 | Less than 665,000 |
Pete Firman and Jessica-Jane Clement marvel at the world's tiniest waists, and Pete Burns completes the final stage of his lip surgery hell. In the studio, a guest shows that age is no obstacle to having a super strong body, and a woman describes how and why she removed her belly button.
| 7 | "Episode 7" | Jill Cumberbatch | Paul Garner | 25 April 2013 | Less than 658,000 |
Verne Troyer investigates the world's biggest burger. The show takes a peek at genital tattoos. And sparks fly when a woman gets out her violet wand.
| 8 | "Episode 8" | Jill Cumberbatch | Paul Garner | 2 May 2013 | Less than 575,000 |
Pete Burns gets up close and personal at a penis museum. There's the couple who like to get a bit tied up and a look at the bagel head body modification trend.
