= Fredi Nwaka =

British director, actor and rapper

== Early life ==
Nwaka was born in London to Nigerian parents.

== Career ==
Fredi Nwaka started his career as a rapper, notably as the only British rapper to be signed to the Wu Tang Clan. Before that he was a bodyguard for many years for artists including Biggie Smalls, TLC, Donnel Jones, 50 Cent. Later, he began acting and has acted in several movies.

Fredi wrote, produced and directed several short films as well as two feature films. Fredi is also the CEO of Gridloc Enterprise Ltd which produces films and TV content as well an events agency Nwaka Nights.

== Filmography ==
Year	Title	Role
2015	A.W.O.L Absent Without Love	Writer
2014	Some Things	Director
2015	A.W.O.L Absent Without Love	Director
TBA	Are We Dead Yet	Producer / Director / Actor / Writer
TBA	Homeless Ashes	Actor
2018	The Block	Actor
2018	The Last Breath	Actor
2018	Black Site	Actor
2018	Bulletproof	Actor
2016	The Diary	Actor / Producer
2016	Deep It	Actor
2016	Brotherhood	Actor
2016	The Intent	Actor
2016	The Forbidden Note	Actor
2015	The Antwerp Dolls	Actor
2015	Legacy	Actor
2014	Plastic	Actor
2012	Pusher	Actor
2012	Outside Bet	Actor
2012	StreetDance 2	Actor
2011	Victim	Actor
2009	Dead Man Running	Actor

== Awards ==
Year	Nominee / work	Award	Result
2014	Leadership and Community Work in Film Industry	NEL UK	Won
2014	Film Director of the Year	Ebony Business Recognition Award	Won
2014	Father of the Year	BYA	Won
2016	Best Film Director	International Achievers Award	Won
2015	Best International Film for AWOL	GI Film Festival	Won
2016	Featured Film: If Only	BEFTA	Won
2015	Best edited film for AWOL	3rd Annual Las Vegas Black Film Festival	Won
2017	Film Mention Award	Romford Film Festival	Won
2016	Best Short Film	BEFFTA	Won
2015	Best Film Producer	C-Hub Awards	Won
