= Devil's Tower (film) =

- Film poster
- Directed by: Owen Tooth
- Written by: Adam J. Marsh
- Produced by: Dominic Burns
- Starring: Jason Mewes; Roxanne Pallett; Frances Ruffelle
- Cinematography: Karl Poyzer; Ben Lewis Turner
- Edited by: Robert Higson; Jon Walmsley
- Production companies: Hawthorn Productions; Templeheart Films
- Distributed by: Monster Pictures (Australia); Uncork'd Entertainment (USA)
- Release date: September 16, 2014
- Running time: 82 minutes
- Country: United Kingdom
- Language: English

Devil's Tower is a 2014 British horror film and the feature film directorial debut of Owen Tooth. The movie was first released in the United Kingdom on 16 September 2014 and stars Jason Mewes and Roxanne Pallett as two people that find themselves forced to fight against zombies.

Of the film, Pallett stated that she found her role to be very demanding, as it required her to work eighteen-hour days over a period of two months.

== Synopsis ==
Sarah (Roxanne Pallett) is a woman that has been thrown out of her house by her alcoholic mother and forced to live in Albion Court, a run-down apartment building with a seedy reputation. With no other options, Sarah tries to make the best of a bad situation and initially things seem to be going fairly well, as she finds that she gets along well with her neighbors. However, it is not long before a series of strange events culminates in a horde of zombies appearing and attacking the building's occupants.

== Cast ==
- Jason Mewes as Sid
- Roxanne Pallett as Sarah MacColl
- Frances Ruffelle as Kim MacColl
- Jessica-Jane Clement as Kate
- Jessica Ann Bonner as Beverly
- Eddie Webber as Carnacki
- Emma Buckley as Lucy
- Jason Bee as Zombie
- Amelia Linney as Mary Butler
- Jazzy Lyntott as Paul
- Peter Barrett as Mark
- Jill Myers as Susan
- Larry Waller as Michael
- Adam Dakin as Jon
- Alison Carroll as Fiona
- Rob Law as Wyngarde
- Jessica Ann Bonner as Bev
- Nathan Morris as Esteban
- Ed Kear as Saxon
- Ahmed Hashimi as Kev
- Holly Henderson & Amanda Leavesley as Party Girls

== Reception ==
Critical reception for Devil's Tower has been moderately positive, with one reviewer commenting that although the film was overly familiar and lacked originality, the movie's acting was decent and the film's script was entertaining. Dread Central gave the film three blades, praising the performance of Jessica-Jane Clement and writing: "It's a strong enough story given some real effort by the cast and was obviously put together by filmmakers with a love of the genre and the drive to make it work regardless of limitations." FromPage2Screen.Com rated Devil's Tower very highly again noticing the care and attention given to the film by filmmakers who love their craft.
