= The Real Hustle =

British television series

- Written by: Alexis Conran; Paul Wilson
- Directed by: Jon Richards; Adrian J. McDowall; Vaughan Dagnell
- Presented by: Alexis Conran; Paul Wilson; Jessica-Jane Clement
- Starring: Jazz Lintott; Polly Parsons
- Narrated by: Dean Lennox Kelly Series 1–2; Steven Jackson Series 3–5; Craig Kelly Series 6 Paul Nicholls Series 7 Tom Oldham Series 8–11
- Country of origin: United Kingdom
- Original language: English
- No. of series: 11
- No. of episodes: 109 (list of episodes)

Production
- Running time: 29 minutes
- Production companies: Objective Productions; Crook Productions

Original release
- Network: BBC Three
- Release: 9 February 2006 – 30 March 2012

Related
- Hustle; It's Your Move; Don't Get Screwed; Fraud Squad TV; Con

The Real Hustle was a BBC British television series created by Objective Productions, Alexis Conran and R. Paul Wilson for BBC Three. The show demonstrated confidence and magic tricks, distraction scams and proposition bets performed on members of the public by hosts Alexis Conran, Paul Wilson and Jessica-Jane Clement. From series 10, entitled "New Recruits", Jazz Lintott and Polly Parsons joined the hustlers.

Several episodes of the series stated that all marks had been genuinely hoodwinked, and that any money lost was returned to them after filming. The BBC's website states that "The marks featured in the show have no idea they are being scammed. They have either been set up by friends and family or think they are taking part in a different TV show."

Following the conclusion of series 11, presenter Alexis Conran tweeted that there were "no plans for series 12".

== History ==
The show began as a spin-off of the BBC show Hustle, owing to the original show's popularity. However, the series is now considered completely separate and the relationship between the shows is rarely mentioned. The Real Hustle was a factual entertainment series produced by Objective Productions for BBC Three. It featured a team of hustlers—Alexis Conran, Paul Wilson and Jessica-Jane Clement—as they try out some notorious scams on members of the public, filmed with hidden cameras. The aim was to reveal how scams work so that the viewer can avoid being ripped off. The participants featured in The Real Hustle are claimed to have been either set up by their family and friends or believe that they are participating in another television programme. After they had been "hustled for real", any money or property taken during the hustle was returned to them and their consent for the item to be broadcast was obtained.

== Episodes ==
Series	Episodes	Originally released	
Series	Episodes	First released	Last released
1	8	9 February 2006	30 March 2006
2	10	7 September 2006	9 November 2006
3	8	15 March 2007	3 May 2007
4	12	30 July 2007	15 October 2007
5	8	12 February 2008	24 March 2008
6	10	9 October 2008	11 December 2008
7	10	21 May 2009	23 July 2009
8	10	14 January 2010	25 February 2010
9	10	29 July 2010	17 September 2010
10	10	5 September 2011	20 January 2012
11	10	27 January 2012	30 March 2012

== Examples of scams ==
- A deposit is taken on a car multiple times from different people who turn up to buy it.
- A computer keyboard is replaced with one containing a key logger and bank details are obtained
- A skimmer device is placed on a cashpoint with a pinhole camera inside it, recording the information on the user's cards magnetic strip along with their PIN; the data is then put on the magnetic strip of an e-top up card which is used to withdraw money from the victim's account
- The black money scam at a market stall
- A fake hollow cash point is installed on a busy street, in which one of the hustlers hides and records the information on the user's cards magnetic strip along with their PIN obtained from the user typing on the keypad.
- Alex and Jess view a car which is for sale. They are given the opportunity to drive the Jaguar. During test driving the car with the owner, Jess who is pregnant, pretends to be in labour. Alex comforts Jess from the passenger side and strongly suggests to the car owner that he should get out of the car and make his way to the back seat to help Jess, which he does. However Alex immediately locks the car doors and takes off with the stolen car.
- Paul and Alex hire a van and buy uniforms, a decal sticker for the van and other items to give the impression that they're custom agents. The scam heavily relies on the power of authority. They spot a van packed with alcohol from Calais and pretend to uphold the law by seizing all of the cases of alcohol, and even order the marks to put the alcohol from their car and into the van by themselves.

In Series 8, for the first time in the show's history, a mark was not fooled by the initial scam. The scam was not pulled by the usual hustlers, but by model Caprice Bourret in a section that features celebrities performing the scams. The scam was to switch genuine twenty-pound notes with fake ones, and then exchange those fake ones for genuine tens with a shop assistant. When Caprice asked for tens and fives, the shop assistant spotted the partly hidden genuine twenties and recognized that the others were fake, so she refused to exchange them. Presenter Jess, who was nearby should anything go wrong, rushed out of the shop to alert Alex and Paul, who quickly came into the shop and confiscated the money by pretending to be police officers.

== Controversy ==
In February 2011, it was reported that some of the "marks" in the programme were paid actors rather than innocent members of the public. Following a BBC investigation, the BBC Trust concluded that although some segments may have misled viewers as to the context of participants' involvement, and that those episodes should not be broadcast again, there was no serious breach of broadcasting guidelines. Although some "marks" had previously worked as actors or extras, they had not been hired for this purpose, and the production company had recruited participants through websites "popular with people keen to appear on television".

== International versions ==
- An Australian version of the show was aired on 14 September 2010 on Channel Nine Starring Adam Mada, Nicholas J Johnson & Claire Werbeloff.
- A Belgian version of the show was produced for VT4 by Toreador.
- A German version of the show was produced for Sat.1 by Granada Production.
- An Israeli version of the show was produced for Channel 10 by Armoza Formats and Buzz TV.
- A New Zealand version was aired 22 March on TV3. The show was produced by Endemol Southern Star.
- A Russian version of the show was produced for Ren TV by Red Planet.
- An American version of the show aired in 2008 on truTV, Real Hustle. The show was produced by Objective Productions.
