= Irish Whip Wrestling =

Irish wrestling promotion

- Acronym: IWW
- Founded: 2002
- Defunct: c. 2022
- Headquarters: Ireland
- Founder: Simon Rochford
- Owner: Simon Rochford

Irish Whip Wrestling (IWW) was an Irish-owned independent professional wrestling promotion established in January 2002. The company was named after a wrestling move called the 'Irish Whip'. IWW ran shows nationally throughout the island of Ireland, both in the Republic of Ireland and Northern Ireland. IWW also ran a number of limited events in Wales, Scotland and England. The company appeared on numerous terrestrial and digital channels in Ireland & the UK and had a weekly show called WHIPLASH TV on The Wrestling Channel, which aired from 2005 to 2006 throughout the UK and Ireland. They also released over a dozen VHS tapes and DVDs of original IWW content, shipping them to over 17 countries worldwide across five continents.

Irish Whip Wrestling was the first ever modern day wrestling promotion in Ireland & the first to tour nationally with former WWE, WCW, ECW & Japanese wrestlers. They were the first wrestling company in Ireland to produce Irish wrestling VHS & DVD content & the first and only Irish promotion to have a wrestling television show aired in Ireland.

Some IWW talent eventually went on to be signed by the World Wrestling Entertainment (WWE).

Irish Whip Wrestling could not run shows during the COVID-19 global pandemic and come 2022 never resumed live event operations afterwards.

== History ==
=== Early years (2002–2004) ===
Irish Whip Wrestling (IWW) ran its first two shows in June 2002 in the National Basketball Arena in Tallaght, which featured wrestler Tatanka. After these two shows, IWW returned to the ESB National Basketball Arena on 9 October for a show that was headlined by Jake "The Snake" Roberts.

IWW continued to promote shows around Ireland through 2003 and 2004. On 2 December 2004, IWW held a show in Lucan, Dublin, and the main event featured an FWA British Heavyweight Championship match in which Alex Shane pinned Sheamus O'Shaunessy. Also in 2004, IWW opened up their 'Lock-up' training school in Dublin. Trainers at this school have included Blake Norton, "Middleman" Lee Butler and "The Pukka One" Darren Burridge. The training school has also been host to the company's Gym Wars shows which gives trainees a chance to show their skills to IWW management and to a crowd.

=== Growth (2005–2007) ===
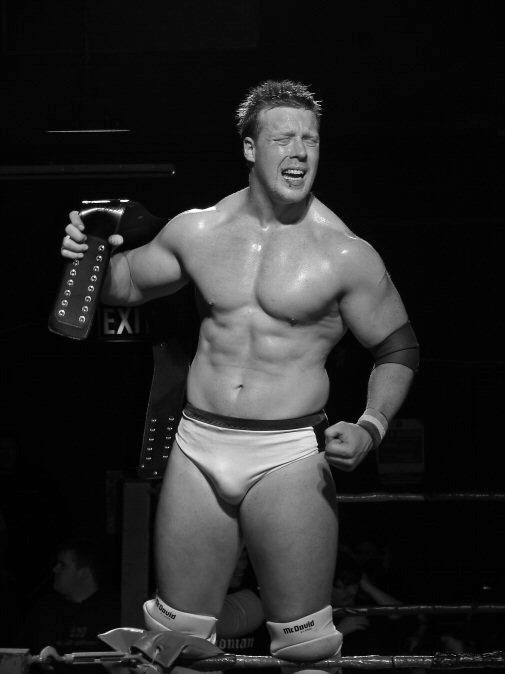
Sheamus, then known as Sheamus O'Shaunessy, as IWW Champion in 2005

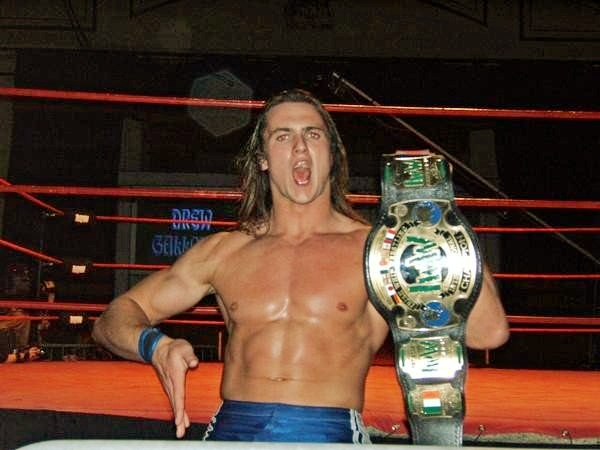
Drew McIntyre with the IWW International Heavyweight Championship belt at an Irish Whip Wrestling event

On 20 March 2005, IWW presented its first-ever SuperShow, held in the SFX City Theatre in Dublin. On 28 March, O'Shaunessy was crowned the first-ever IWW International Heavyweight Champion when he defeated Darren Burridge in the tournament final. American wrestler D'Lo Brown unseated O'Shaunessy as IWW Champion at D-Day on 20 May 2005. Brown reigned for 126 days, before dropping the title back to O'Shaunessy at a Main Event Wrestling Event in Newcastle, England.

Also in 2005, IWW got its own TV show called Whiplash TV, which was broadcast on The Wrestling Channel on Sky Digital. The show ran for two seasons. Throughout May and June 2006, IWW taped several episodes of its Whiplash TV show in the Laughter Lounge in Dublin City. In 2006, IWW ran shows in cities across Ireland. From August to October 2006, the first ever King of the Gym tournament was held over the course of four Gym Wars events. The key IWW feud of this period was between O'Shaunessy and Drew Galloway who battled in a series of gimmick matches (Lumberjack, Two-Out-of-Three Falls, Last Man Standing) between January and August 2006 until Galloway successfully defeated O'Shaunessy to win the IWW title and the end their rivalry.

At the beginning of 2007, the IWW Zero Gravity Championship was created, and a tournament was held to crown the first champion. The 12-man tournament included wrestlers from seven countries.

In March 2007, IWW held its second SuperShow, and in the main event, Vic Viper defeated Christopher Daniels to retain the IWW International Heavyweight Championship. On 6 July, IWW returned to the Forum in Waterford for its Global Impact show, which was taped for DVD sales. The match between the Ballymun Bruiser and Doug Williams was featured on TV3's Diary of a Sportstar program.

In late October 2007, it ran 14 shows between 19 and 28 October. Several matches on the tour were taped for the International Hits, Vol. 1 DVD.

=== Return of Gym Wars; Memorial Tournament & Tours (2008–2022) ===
In 2008, Gym Wars shows were replaced with more additional live events. Later that year IWW returned to the National Basketball Arena in Tallaght, Dublin for the first time in six years. All the matches were taped for IWW's television show on Buzz TV.

IWW continued running national shows in 2011 and had re-runs on of their content on a number Irish terrestrial TV channels. Around this time, they branched into more fundraiser festival seasonal events and festival circuit shows.

From 2012 onward, IWW focused on showcasing almost exclusively Irish talent, resulting in a smaller roster that still utilised touring performers from Canada, America, the UK, and Europe.

Irish Whip Wrestling toured nationally, participating in the festival and agricultural show circuit. In 2019, they held approximately 30 shows, compared to their peak of over 60 shows per year.

Come 2022, Irish Whip Wrestling never returned to performing live events.

==== Hibernation ====
Irish Whip Wrestling stopped running live events in 2022.

== Championships ==
=== IWW International Heavyweight Championship ===
Irish Whip Wrestling Heavyweight Championship

Details
- Promotion: Irish Whip Wrestling
- Date established: 27 March 2005
- Current champion: The Galway Grappler
Statistics
- Most reigns: Sheamus O' Shaunessy (2 reigns)
- Longest reign: The Galway Grappler 2,899+ days
- Shortest reign: Sheamus O' Shaunessy (62 Days)
- Youngest champion: Drew Galloway (21 years)

The IWW International Heavyweight Championship is the primary title for IWW. The championship was created in 2005. A tournament was held in Naas, County Kildare in March 2005 to crown the first ever champion. The former champion Mandrake was the longest reigning champion in history of the company. On 5 February 2010, the Zero Gravity Title was unified with it and it became known as the Irish Whip Wrestling Unified Heavyweight Championship. On 30 April 2011, The Supermodel defeated Mandrake for the IWW International Heavyweight championship. The Zero Gravity championship was un-unified with the International Heavyweight Championship after this match.

#	Wrestler	Reigns	Date	Days held	Location	Event	Notes	Ref.
1	Sheamus O' Shaunessy	1	28 March 2005	62	Naas, Kildare, Ireland	IWW Event	Defeated Darren Burridge in a tournament final.	
2	D'Lo Brown	1	29 May 2005	126	Dublin, Ireland	IWW D-Day		
3	Sheamus O' Shaunessy	2	2 October 2005	329	Newcastle, England	MEW The Northern Bash		
4	Drew Galloway	1	27 August 2006	141	Balbriggan, Dublin, Ireland	IWW International Intermingle		
5	Vic Viper	1	17 January 2007	423	Baldoyle, Dublin, Ireland	IWW Gym War #18	Defeated Mad Man Manson, Kid Kash, and Ballymun Bruiser for vacant title.	
6	Mandrake	1	15 March 2008	1,141	Donnycarney, Dublin, Ireland	IWW St. Paddy's Tour	Defeated Vic Viper and Eugene	
7	The Supermodel	1	30 April 2011	883	Birr, Offaly, Ireland	IWW Event		
8	Captain Rooney	1	29 September 2013	564	Dundalk, Louth, Ireland	IWW Event		
9	TJ Meehan	1	16 April 2015	665	Roscommon, Ireland			
10	The Ballymun Bruiser	1	3 December 2016	552	Letterkenny, Donegal, Ireland	IWW Event		
11	The Galway Grappler	1	6 August 2018	???	Durrow, Laois, Ireland	IWW Event	This was a fatal four-way match also involving J-Money and Oisin Delaney	

=== IWW Zero Gravity Championship ===
Irish Whip Wrestling Zero-Gravity Championship

Details
- Promotion: Irish Whip Wrestling
- Date established: 14 January 2007
Statistics
- Most reigns: Bingo Ballance (4 reigns)
- Longest reign: The Galway Grappler (1,371 Days)
- Shortest reign: Bam Katraz (14 Days)

The IWW Zero Gravity Championship is professional wrestling championship in IWW. The championship was created in early 2007. The tournament to crown the inaugural champion was a 12-man tournament including wrestlers from seven countries. On 5 February 2010, it was unified with the IWW International Heavyweight Championship and retired. It was later reactivated, after Mandrake lost the IWW International Heavyweight Championship.

Y#	Wrestler	Reigns	Date	Days held	Location	Event	Notes	Ref.
1	Bingo Ballance	1	14 January 2007	159	Balbriggan, Dublin, Ireland	IWW Zero-Gravity	Defeated Pac	
2	Bam Katraz	1	22 June 2007	14	Balbriggan, Dublin, Ireland	IWW Doomsday in Dublin		
3	Bingo Ballance	2	6 July 2007	106	Waterford, Ireland	IWW Global Impact	Defeated Pac and Bam Katraz	
4	Red Vinny	1	20 October 2007	147	Kilkenny, Ireland	IWW 5th Anniversary National Tour		
5	Vic Viper	1	15 March 2008	91	Donnycarney, Dublin, Ireland	IWW St. Paddy's Tour	Defeated Red Vinny, Bam Katraz, Bingo Ballance, and Liam Thompson	
6	Bingo Ballance	3	14 June 2008	230	Tallaght, Dublin, Ireland	IWW Buzz TV-Taping	Defeated Vic Viper, Red Vinny, and Metal Master	
7	LA Warren	1	30 January 2009	268	Rathcoole, County Dublin, Ireland	IWW Event		
8	Angus J. Rotanda	1	25 October 2009	103	Portlaoise, Ireland	IWW Event		
9	Mandrake	1	30 April 2011	148	Newry, County Down, Northern Ireland	IWW Event		
10	Skaterboi Jeebus	1	25 September 2011	979	Louth, Ireland	IWW Event		
11	Cambo Cray	1	31 May 2014	820	Kilkeel, Northern Ireland			
12	The Galway Grappler	1	28 August 2016	97	Cashel, County Tipperary, Ireland	IWW Dualla Show		
13	Cambo Cray	2	3 December 2016	183	Letterkenny, County Donegal, Ireland	IWW Event		
14	The Galway Grappler	2	4 June 2017	369	Leixlip, County Kildare, Ireland	IWW Event		
15	Bingo Ballance	4	8 June 2018	???	Durrow, County Laois, Ireland	IWW Event		

=== King of the Gym winners ===
- 2006: Wayne Daly
- 2007: Brother Skelly
- 2008: Keith Connolly

=== Danno Mahony Tournament winners ===
- 2008: Mandrake
- 2009: The Supermodel
- 2010: Mandrake
- 2011: Captain Rooney

== Alumni ==
- Tyson Kidd
- Go Shiozaki
- Taiji Ishimori
- Vampiro
- Tyson T-Bone
- Matt Striker
- Finn Balor
- Drew McIntyre
- Michael Kovac
- Bobby Fish
- Joe E. Legend
- Sami Zayn
- Jonny Storm
- Vid Vain
- Matt Cross
- Jody Fleisch
- Lionheart
- Fast Eddie
- Bruce Prichard
- P. N. News
- Robbie Brookside
- Mark Haskins
- Steve Lynsky
- Xavier
- Dave Mastiff
- Sugar Dunkerton
- Mikey Batts
- The Green Phantom
- CJ Banks
- April Hunter
- Bad Bones
- Frank 'Chic' Cullen
- Frank 'Midge' Casey
- Pat Barrett
- Wade Barrett
- Balls Mahoney
- Big Vito
- Jezabel
- Jake Roberts
- Kid Kash
- Tracy Smothers
- Doug Basham
- Raven
- Rene Dupree
- Eugene
- Christopher Daniels
- Andy Boy Simmonz
- Kevin Thorn
- A.J. Styles
- Pierre Carl Ouellet
- Lupin Matsutani
- Darryl Sharma
- Dru Onyx
- Kenny Lush
- Joel Redman
- Jonathan Gresham
- Nigel McGuinness
- Pierre Marceaux
- Chris Raaber
- Scott Conway
- Shawn Daivari
- Mike Modest
- Wolfgang
- Ricky Marvin
- Colt Cabana
- Doug Williams
- Pac
- Neil Faith
- Justice Pain
- D'Lo Brown
- El Ligero
- Chris Sabin
- Tatanka
- Takeshi Rikio
- Dragon Kid
- CIMA
- Portia Perez
- Daizee Haze
- Zandig
- Sandman
- Kenichiro Arai
- Allison Danger
- Hannibal
- Scotty Mac
- Jessica Black
- Mad Man Manson
- Mandrake
- Ballymun Bruiser
- Sunny
- Eddie Edwards
- Vince Russo
- Domino
- Sheamus

== See also ==
- List of professional wrestling promotions in Europe
