= Black Site (2018 film) =

- Directed by: Tom Paton
- Written by: Tom Paton
- Produced by: George Burt; Craig Hinde; Mikel Iriarte; Alexa Waugh
- Starring: Samantha Schnitzler; Mike Beckingham; Kris Johnson; Bentley Kalu; Angela Dixon; Phoebe Robinson-Rodrigues; Sophia Del Pizzo; Andy Gibbins; Jessica-Jane Clement; Fredi Nwaka; Alana Wallace
- Cinematography: George Burt
- Edited by: Tom Paton
- Music by: Max Sweiry
- Release dates: 27 August 2018 (FrightFest); 1 September 2018 (US)
- Running time: 91 minutes
- Country: United Kingdom
- Language: English

Black Site is a 2018 British science-fiction action horror film directed by Tom Paton, starring Samantha Schnitzler, Mike Beckingham, Kris Johnson, Bentley Kalu, Angela Dixon, Phoebe Robinson-Rodrigues, Sophia Del Pizzo, Andy Gibbins, Jessica-Jane Clement, Fredi Nwaka and Alana Wallace.

== Cast ==
- Samantha Schnitzler as Ren Reid
  - Esme Douthwaite as Young Ren
- Mike Beckingham as Sam
- Kris Johnson as Erebus
- Bentley Kalu as Jay Austin
- Angela Dixon as Jennifer Wilkinson
- Phoebe Robinson-Rodrigues as Ker
- Sophia Del Pizzo as Danforth
- Andy Gibbins as Agent Joe Washbourn
- Jessica-Jane Clement as Agent Ackerman
- Fredi Nwaka as Agent Braus
- Alana Wallace as Helen Reid
- Lauren Ashley Carter as Agent Leonhart
- Henry Douthwaite as Rob Reid
- Toby Osmond as August Kellerman

== Release ==
The film premiered at FrightFest on 27 August 2018.

== Reception ==
On Rotten Tomatoes, the film has an approval rating of 67% based on 9 reviews.

James Perkins of Starburst rated the film 7 stars out of 10 and wrote that it is "more proof that Tom Paton is a true rising Director in British Independent cinema and must be championed for taking inspiration and adding his own flavour."

Anton Bitel of SciFiNow called the film a "loving homage to the kind of anything-goes paranoid sci-fi actioners which were once the specialty of Carpenter and Cronenberg."

Kevin Scott of PopHorror wrote: "The fluidity of funneling the character development, the mythos, and the action sequences into the plot make it an automatic recommend."

Bobby LePire of Film Threat gave the film a score of 4.5/10 and wrote: "Paton is a fantastic visual stylish with a flair for action, but despite the efforts of a talented cast, the characters have little depth and spend so much expositing about this world that nothing happens for a while."
