= Buzz TV =

- Country: Ireland

Programming
- Picture format: 576i SDTV (digital)

Ownership
- Owner: Blackdog Communications
- Sister channels: Smile TV

History
- Launched: June 2008
- Closed: July 2010

Links
- Website: www.buzztv.ie

Buzz TV was an Irish user-generated television channel that was launched in June 2008, it closed 2 years later in July 2010. The channel allowed viewers to upload their own content, as well as focusing on independent productions, and broadcast on cable and Internet Protocol TV. It was only available on Irish cable provider UPC, on their digital service, channel 131 (their sister service was available on 132).

Viewers could text in comments during various programmes, voting for music video of the week, or even use the channel as a social network to chat to the presenter or other viewers. The channel also aired other material such as independent artists' music videos, comedy sketches, and short films.

== Background ==
Buzz TV was officially available throughout Ireland to 380,000 households on UPC Ireland. On 10 July 2010 both it and its sister channel Smile TV were removed from UPC EPG while the website www.buzztv.ie was removed from the internet.

== Programmes ==
- Fashion TV
- Music Festival Diary
- MTV The Festival Show
- Gillette World Sports
- Curb Surfers
- Sumo TV Ireland
- Irish Whip Wrestling
- Film Seasons
- Cartoons

== See also ==
- Media of the Republic of Ireland
- List of Irish television channels
