= Titanic Thompson =

American gambler, golfer, and hustler

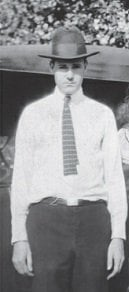
- Thompson in a 1915 visit to Arkansas
- Born: Alvin Clarence Thomas; November 30, 1893; Monett, Missouri, U.S.
- Died: May 19, 1974 (aged 80); Euless, Texas, U.S.
- Other name: Titanic Thompson
- Occupations: Hustler, gambler, golfer
- Spouse(s): 1) Nora Trushel (divorced); 2) Alice Kane (killed in road accident); 3) Jo Ann Raney (divorced); 4) Maxine Melton (divorced); 5) Jeannette Bennett (divorced)
- Children: 3

Alvin Clarence Thomas (November 30, 1893 – May 19, 1974), better known as Titanic Thompson, was an American gambler, golfer, and hustler, who killed five men but was never charged with a crime.

Thompson traveled the country wagering at cards, dice games, golf, shooting, billiards, horseshoes and proposition bets of his own devising. As an ambidextrous golfer, card player, marksman and pool shark, his skills and reputation were compared to "Merlin himself". Writer Damon Runyon allegedly based the character Sky Masterson, the gambler-hero of "The Idyll of Miss Sarah Brown" (on which the musical Guys and Dolls is based), on Thompson. In 1928, Thompson was involved in a high-stakes poker game that led to the shooting death of New York City crime boss Arnold Rothstein, then called the "crime of the century". The following year he testified in the trial of George McManus, who was charged with Rothstein's murder, but later acquitted.

== Early life ==
Thomas was born in Monett, Missouri, but was raised mainly on a farm 50 miles to the south, near Rogers, Arkansas, in the Ozark Mountains. His mother remarried following desertion by Thomas' father, who was himself a gambler. Thomas began conducting his nomadic, lucrative career of hustling in the rural south-central United States circa 1908, leaving home at age 16 with less than one dollar in his pocket. Unable to read or write effectively, he had attended school only sporadically, and felt unwelcome in the home of his stepfather. Thomas spent most of his youth developing skills he would use later, such as shooting and understanding odds at card games through marathon dealing of hands.

== Trapshooting career ==
As a young boy, Thomas was known by his uncles for his precise shooting. Allegedly, they had seen him down birds with a shot between the eyes from fifty yards away. These skills would land him work with Captain Adam Henry Bogardus in his "Miracle Medicine Show". During the show, Thomas would entertain onlookers by shooting pie tins, cabbages, and by tricking viewers into thinking he shot a silver dollar out of the air. In 1951, many years after his "Miracle Medicine Show" days, Thomas showed off his still-sharp shooting skills by winning the Arizona State Trapshooting Championship four years in a row from 1951 to 1954.

== Military service ==
Thomas was drafted in early 1918, several months after the United States entered World War I. Following basic training, where he excelled, he was promoted to the rank of sergeant. Thomas remained stateside, trained younger draftees, and did not see overseas service or combat before the war ended in November 1918, when he was discharged. Thomas also taught gambling skills to many of his trainees, and then proceeded to win substantial money from them. He ended the war with more than $50,000 in cash, and used much of this money to buy his mother a house in Monett, Missouri, his birthplace.

== Gambling style and favorite bets ==
Later, when Thompson had honed his skills, he became a "road gambler", a traveling hustler who became an underground legend by winning at all manner of propositions, many of them tricky if not outright fraudulent. Among his favorites were: betting he could throw a walnut over a building (he had weighted the hollowed shell with lead beforehand), throwing a large room key into its lock, and moving a road mileage sign before betting that the listed distance to the town was in error. Thompson once bet that he could drive a golf ball 500 yards, using a hickory-shafted club, at a time when an expert player's drive was just over 200 yards. He won by waiting until winter and driving the ball onto a frozen lake, where it bounced past the required distance on the ice.

Thompson's partners in "the hustling game" included pool player Minnesota Fats, who considered Titanic a genius, "the greatest action man of all time".

Thompson's one weakness, as he admitted, was betting on horse racing, where he lost millions of dollars during his life in failed bets.

== Expert golfer ==
Gifted with extraordinary eyesight and hand–eye coordination, he was a skilled athlete, crack shot and a golfer good enough to turn professional. Raised in a poor environment far from exclusive golf courses, Thomas did not take up golf seriously until he was in his early thirties, but he improved very quickly during an extended stint in San Francisco, where he took lessons from club professionals and honed his skills. From then on he played several times per week for the next 20 years. In an era when the top pro golfers would be fortunate to make $30,000 a year, Thomas (who, after a misprint in a New York newspaper, let people think his name was Thompson) could make that much in a week hustling rich country club players. Asked whether he would ever turn professional, he replied, "I could not afford the cut in pay". Hall of Fame golfer Ben Hogan, who traveled with him in the early 1930s for money games, later called Titanic the best shotmaker he ever saw. "He can play right- or left-handed, you can't beat him", said Hogan. One hustle of his was to beat a golfer playing right-handed, and then offer double or nothing to play the course again left-handed as an apparent concession. One thing his opponent usually did not know was that Thomas was naturally left-handed. Thomas' genius was in figuring out the odds on almost any proposition and heavily betting that way. He also had to perform under pressure, and most often did.

As he aged, Thompson liked to pick promising young players as his golf partners. Several of these who went on to later PGA Tour stardom included young and then-unknown Ben Hogan, Ky Laffoon, Herman Keiser and Lee Elder. Other well-known golfers who left behind first-hand documented accounts of their dealings and matches with Thompson include Harvey Penick, Paul Runyan, Byron Nelson and Sam Snead, all of whom were inducted into the World Golf Hall of Fame.

== Marriages and family ==
Married five times, Thompson fathered three children, all boys, with three different wives. He was also romantically linked with many women. Among his alleged trysts were actresses Myrna Loy and Jean Harlow. He typically married a young woman, lived with her for a few months, then returned to his road hustling, while leaving comfortable housing and financial support for his newly divorced wife.

== Killings ==
Thompson killed five men. The first was in 1910, in rural Arkansas, when a man named Jim Johnson accused him of cheating at dice and threw him off the boat on which they were traveling (and which Thompson had recently won when gambling with its previous owner, a friend of Johnson's). When Thompson climbed back on board, Johnson drew a knife and threatened Thompson's girlfriend, who was also on board. Thompson seized a hammer and struck Johnson several times on the head before throwing him overboard. The unconscious Johnson drowned. Thompson showed no remorse, stating it was Johnson's fault for not being able to swim. The sheriff gave Thompson the choice of standing trial, or handing over the deed to the boat and leaving town; he chose the latter.

The other four men Thompson killed were shot in self-defense when they tried to rob him of gambling winnings. Two were killed in one incident in St. Louis in 1919 (the local police chief thanked him for killing two wanted bank robbers). The third came in St. Joseph, where Thompson and his hired bodyguard between them shot two men attempting to rob a poker game (again, the victims were known criminals and no charges were pressed). Thompson's last killing came near a country club in Texas in 1932 when he shot a masked figure who was holding him at gunpoint. This turned out to be sixteen-year-old Jimmy Frederick, who had caddied for Thompson earlier that day in a winning match. The dying Frederick confirmed to witnesses that he had been trying to rob Thompson.

== Arnold Rothstein case ==
On November 4, 1928, Arnold Rothstein was murdered, allegedly because he refused to pay his debts from a poker game, held the previous month, which he believed to have been fixed. This game had been organized by George McManus, who stood trial for the murder the next year, in a proceeding heavily covered by the media. McManus was eventually acquitted due to lack of evidence, and no one else was ever tried for Rothstein's death. Thompson had been present at the game, and an active participant in it; and it was he who, in association with one Nate Raymond, allegedly fixed the game, leaving Rothstein with total debts estimated at $500,000. Thompson, who was not present at the shooting, gave evidence at McManus's trial, without revealing his own role in the poker game. Rothstein had stood to recoup his losses by successful heavy bets on the 1928 elections of Herbert Hoover (new president) and Franklin Delano Roosevelt (new governor of New York), which did take place, shortly after Rothstein's death. Thompson later told close friends that he knew the real killer had been Rothstein's bodyguard.

== Origin of the nickname ==
In his own story, published in Sports Illustrated in 1972, Alvin Thomas, listed as a co-author, said:

In the spring of 1912 I went to Joplin, Missouri, just about the time the Titanic liner hit an iceberg and sank with more than 1,500 people on board. I was in a pool room there and beat a fellow named Snow Clark out of $500. To give him a chance to get even, I bet $200 I could jump across his pool table without touching it. If you think that's easy, try it. But I could jump farther than a herd of bullfrogs in those days. I put down an old mattress on the other side of the table. Then I took a run and dived headfirst across the pool table. While I was counting my money, somebody asked Clark what my name was. "It must be Titanic," said Clark. "He sinks everybody." So I was Titanic from then on.

Minnesota Fats, real name Rudolf Wanderone, said in an interview with the Los Angeles Times that "Titanic got his nickname when he went down with the Titanic in 1912. He put on ladies' clothes to save himself. Got off the boat first."

== Trevino vs. Floyd match ==
In the 1960s, Thompson settled in Dallas and, although approaching 70 years of age, kept up a good standard of golf, and frequently hustled games at Tenison Park, a municipal golf course, and at posh Glen Lakes Country Club. Mid-decade, Thompson sponsored a young Raymond Floyd, then early in his PGA Tour career but already a winner, in a big-money stakes match against Lee Trevino, then an unknown assistant pro, in El Paso, at Trevino's home course. After three days of play, honors and bets were equal, with both players well under par each round. Trevino gained confidence from the match, and within a few years became a Tour star himself, while Floyd's career also ascended.

== Later years ==
Thompson participated in the first World Series of Poker in Las Vegas, Nevada, in 1970. He lived out his final years in a nursing home near Dallas. Thompson had made gambling trips with eldest son Tommy for many years, but after his father died, Tommy, who also had become a skilled, successful gambler, gave up gambling for a church ministry and later counseled prisoners, preaching to convince others to stay away from gambling.
