= Alexis Conran =

British actor, writer, TV and radio presenter

- Born: Paris, France
- Occupations: Actor, writer, TV and radio presenter
- Spouse: Cosima Shaw (?–present)
- Website: www.alexisconran.com

Alexis Conran is a British French-born actor, writer and presenter on TV and radio, who currently hosts the weekend afternoon show on Times Radio and a number of consumer advice programmes for 5. He is also known for co-hosting the BBC Three show The Real Hustle from 2006 until 2012.

He was born in south Paris, France, and moved to Greece when he was a child. Conran won Celebrity Masterchef 2016 on 29 July, beating Louise Minchin and Jimmy Osmond in the final.

== Early life ==
Conran was born in Paris to a father who was a gambling addict and started to get into debt. He turned to crime and became a thief and conman, eventually getting arrested. When Conran was seven years old, his parents divorced. He was then raised by his mother with the help of her parents. He is of Greek heritage.

Aged 16, he moved to London to study at the London Academy of Music and Dramatic Art.

== Career ==
In 2000, Conran starred in the music video for Blockhead's "Insomniac Olympics", directed by Sam Arthur.. Later that year he had a minor role in the TV miniseries Arabian Nights, playing Prince Ali.

His stage work includes Excuses! in 2003. In 2003, he was a member of a team of experts advising the writers and actors of the hit BBC series Hustle, which he later co-wrote and presented (confidence trickster) on the follow-up 2006–2012 hit series The Real Hustle on BBC Three. In 2015 he starred in the show Man v Expert on the Discovery Channel, in which he used various tricks to try to beat experts in their own field of expertise. In 2013 Conran wrote and presented Hustling America for Channel 5 and National Geographic, which was similar to The Real Hustle.

He has helped the Office of Fair Trading show consumers how to avoid becoming the victim of fraud, and is a regular presenter of consumer advice shows for Channel 5, with titles such as Scams: Don't Get Caught Out and Electric Cars: Which One Should You Buy?.

His other television roles include 2 episodes he starred in season 5 of the show Waking the Dead, as Michael Sherman. He appeared in the TV show Wire in the Blood. He also starred in a TV advert for Zovirax cold sore cream. In 2013 he appeared in the Channel 4 show Eye Spy and in August 2015 he presented the Channel 5 morning show The Wright Stuff whilst the host was on holiday.

Conran played the role of Dr Petridis in ITV's The Durrells.

In 2016, he co-presented The Joy of Techs with his best friend, Marcus Brigstocke.

He was Celebrity MasterChef Champion 2016.

Conran presented Radio Hustles on Talkradio, a consumer affairs based talk show which aired from 1 pm to 3 pm on Saturdays. From 20 January 2018 to June 2020, the show changed from being consumer affairs based to being a news phone-in discussion programme, still presented by Conran, with the new airtime of 4pm to 7pm on Saturdays. He also presented a Sunday morning political programme until June 2020, when he left the station for Times Radio.

Since July 2020, he has presented a show on Times Radio between 1-4pm on Saturday and Sunday.

In 2023, he became the regular presenter of Alexis Conran and Friends, a programme on Channel 5 which followed on from similar programmes in the morning with Jeremy Vine and Storm Huntley. In 2025, when Vanessa with Vanessa Feltz took over the slot where Alexis Conran and Friends was, Conran could be still seen on 5 as one of the regular cover presenters for these shows, along with Matt Allwright.

In February 2025 it was announced that Conran would be "stepping away" from Times Radio.

== Personal life ==
Conran is a technophile. He is a collector of playing cards, owning over 5,060 decks and spends an hour each day practising card tricks. He has a daughter, Thalia (born 2006).
