= Roxanne Pallett =

English actress

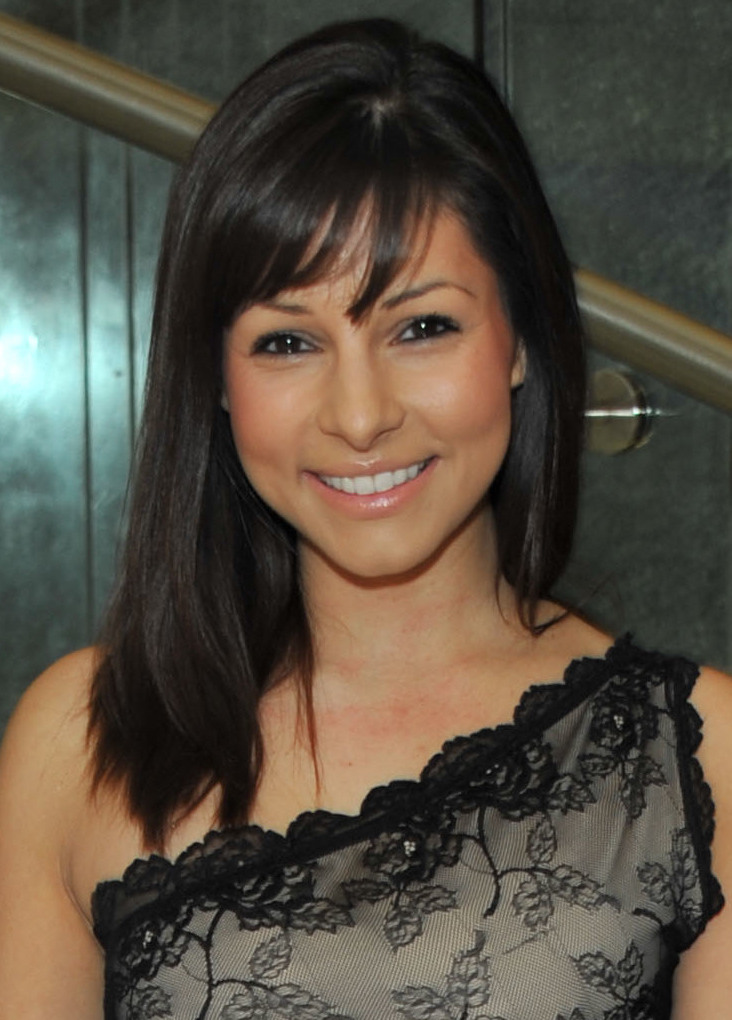
- Carrion at an event for The Woman in Black (2012)
- Born: Roxanne Kaboli-Nejad; 26 December 1982 (age 43); Carlisle, Cumbria, England
- Education: Liverpool John Moores University
- Occupations: Actress; television personality
- Years active: 2005–2019
- Spouse: Jason Carrion (m. 2020)
- Children: 1

Roxanne Carrion (formerly Pallett; born Roxanne Kaboli-Nejad; 26 December 1982) is an English former actress, television personality, and broadcaster.

She is best known as a housemate on the twenty-second series of Celebrity Big Brother, which saw her falsely accuse fellow housemate Ryan Thomas of punching her which effectively ended her television career.

She also played the role of Jo Stiles in the ITV soap opera Emmerdale (2005–2008).

She also appeared in the horror films Lake Placid 3 (2010), Wrong Turn 6: Last Resort (2014) and Devil's Tower (2014), as well as making appearances in other shows including Casualty (2010, 2012) and Waterloo Road (2012).

Pallett also starred in various stage productions.

Pallett went to appear on various reality television shows, including Celebrity Stars in Their Eyes (2006), Soapstar Superstar (2006), Dancing on Ice (2009), Celebrity Island with Bear Grylls (2018) and Celebrity Coach Trip (2019).

Pallett subsequently married and emigrated to the U.S.

== Early life ==
Roxanne Kaboli-Nejad was born on 26 December 1982 in Carlisle, Cumbria to an Iranian father, Johandar Kaboli-Nejad, and an English mother, Monica Pallett.

After her father walked out on the family, Roxanne took her mother's surname and was brought up in Currock by her mother and grandmother.

Her maternal grandfather was Italian.

== Career ==
In her final year of university, Pallett co-formed girl group Urban Angel, writing songs for them with producer, ex-East 17 member Tony Mortimer. After landing a deal with a record label, Pallett spent a year developing her music in London and co-creating a TV show.

She later auditioned for several roles in Emmerdale and was offered the role of Jo Stiles.

During her three years on Emmerdale, she was nominated for several awards, including Sexiest Female, Best Storyline, and Best Actress at The British Soap Awards, the Inside Soap Awards and the TV Quick Awards.

In November 2005, Pallett won a celebrity edition of Stars in Their Eyes as Gloria Estefan, although the programme was never transmitted.

In January 2006, she appeared in the ITV entertainment singing show Soapstar Superstar, finishing in fourth place and raising more than £70,000 for the Eden Valley Hospice Jigsaw Appeal. While competing on Soapstar Superstar, she met her then partner, actor Richard Fleeshman.

She was also named in the 2006 100 Most Sexiest Women in the World list by FHM in 2006. Pallett went on to do photoshoots for rival magazines Loaded and Maxim.

After leaving Emmerdale, Pallett took part in the fourth series of ITV's Dancing on Ice in 2009 with professional partner Daniel Whiston. She was voted off unanimously by the judges following a skate-off with former Blue Peter presenter Zoe Salmon, but went onto take part in the show's spin-off Bolero Anniversary UK Tour.

Pallett was scheduled to play the lead role in the 2009 Christmas pantomime Cinderella at the Theatre Royal, Newcastle upon Tyne, she left three weeks into the run following the death of her best friend.

In 2010, Pallett filmed a guest role for the BBC's Casualty. She also made her professional stage debut in Rock Around The Clock, which toured the country until September. In the same year, she also made her film debut in Lake Placid 3. In September 2010, Pallett toured with Eve Ensler's Vagina Monologues, opposite Nikki Sanderson and Sue Jenkins. In 2012, Pallett played a troubled 17-year old school girl, Shelby Dixon, in BBC's Waterloo Road, a role that was twelve years younger than the actress herself in real life, followed by a second guest role in Casualty as psychotic character Keeley Hyatt. She was also cast as Sarah McColl in British horror film Devil's Tower, followed by the urban comedy It's A Lot, in November 2013. Pallett also played Janet Weiss in the 40th anniversary UK tour of The Rocky Horror Show.

In 2016, Pallett began a run in the UK touring production of the eighties musical The Wedding Singer based on the Adam Sandler and Drew Barrymore film of the same name. She starred alongside Ray Quinn and Ruth Madoc in the stage musical. In April 2017, Pallett unexpectedly left the production mid-way through its run despite positive reviews.

In February 2018, Pallett joined local radio station Minster FM as co-host for its weekday breakfast show, after admitting that she had felt unfulfilled and undervalued as an actress for many years. Pallett left the station after seven months, following her appearance on Celebrity Big Brother.

In September 2018, Pallett appeared on the third series of Celebrity Island with Bear Grylls, which was filmed in May. She left in the first episode after the campfire smoke reminded her of a childhood house fire and she suffered a panic attack as a result. After waking in the night in a panic, Roxanne told her campmates: "Smoke that nearly killed my family in a house fire when I was 16, the smoke, the smell is taking me back to that time." Another misfortune on the Island which Pallett endured was getting her leg caught in a fishing net and having to be cut free by other camp mates.

In 2019, Pallett appeared on the fourth series of Celebrity Coach Trip, which was filmed in July 2018.

=== Celebrity Big Brother ===
In August 2018, while participating in the twenty-second series of Celebrity Big Brother, Pallett falsely accused fellow housemate Ryan Thomas of punching her "repeatedly, unprovoked and completely deliberately" during a play-fight. She later slept in the spare bedroom, after she claimed that she felt uncomfortable sleeping in the same room as him.

Following the incident, Thomas was given a formal warning, and maintained that there had been "no malice" in any of his conduct. However, Pallett branded him a "liar", and a "woman beater".

In the face of crowds outside the house "booing her name", she subsequently decided to leave the house in the early hours of Day 17 (1 September 2018). Two days after leaving the house, she returned for a pre-recorded interview with show host Emma Willis, shown during that night's eviction programme.

In the face of Willis challenging her statements regarding Thomas, observing Pallett "could have ruined him", Pallett apologised, stating she had made a "horrible mistake" and said that she wanted to be forgiven for her actions.

The incident, which generated more than 25,000 viewer complaints to Ofcom, was dubbed "punchgate" by some sections of the press. Viewers called Pallett's interview "insincere" and a "publicity stunt" undertaken as "damage limitation".

Pallett subsequently fully withdrew her false accusations and admitted her fault, apologising to Thomas and saying her actions were "an overreaction to what wasn't a malicious act. I was sensitive and emotional and mistook what was playful – I apologise for it; I shouldn't have questioned his motivation."

Following this incident, actor Sam Attwater claimed he had a similar experience with Pallett during the Rocky Horror tour in which they both took part; having hit him, Pallett left the stage claiming to have been struck by Attwater. Actor Connor Byrne supported Attwater's statement, having himself been accused of "violence" while working with Pallett on a pantomime the previous year, notwithstanding the presence of a colleague at the time who could attest to the falsity of Pallett's claim.

== Personal life ==
In 2017, Pallett began an online relationship with steelworker Lee Walton, after Walton contacted her on Instagram through a mutual love for Elvis Presley. They met for the first time in December 2017, and a week later, Walton asked her to move in with him, proposing to her a day after she did so.

In July 2018, during a feature assignment for Minster FM with breakfast co-presenter Ben Fry, Pallett was involved in an accident while driving an F2 Outlaw Stock Car at Hunmanby Raceway, North Yorkshire. Pallett had driven head on into a concrete wall on the first bend, and had to be cut free from the car by firefighters, which took them two hours. She was then airlifted to a hospital with a sprained wrist and some bruising.

On 26 January 2020, Pallett married firefighter and former Married at First Sight contestant Jason Carrion at the Lutheran Evangelical Church in New York, two months after their engagement.

In June 2021, Pallett announced she was pregnant with her first child, and later gave birth to a son.

== Outside acting ==
In 2007, Rosa Roxanne Pallett, a deep red hybrid rose, was named after Pallett and launched at the 2007 Southport Flower Show by Cheshire-based grower C&K Jones.

== Filmography ==
| Year | Title | Role | Notes |
|---|---|---|---|
| 2005–2008 | Emmerdale | Jo Stiles | 358 episodes |
| 2009 | Dancing on Ice | Herself | Participant (17 episodes) |
| 2010 | Lake Placid 3 | April | Supporting role |
| 2010 | Casualty | Keeley Hyatt | 1 episode |
| 2011 | Generator Rex | Various | 1 episode |
| 2011 | Total Wipeout | Herself | Contestant (1 episode) |
| 2012 | Waterloo Road | Shelby Dixon | 1 episode |
| 2012 | Casualty | Leanne Greening | 1 episode |
| 2012 | Crime Stories | Linda Brooks | 1 episode |
| 2013 | It's a Lot | Louise | Supporting role |
| 2014 | Wrong Turn 6: Last Resort | Jillian | Supporting role |
| 2014 | Devil's Tower | Sarah MacColl | Supporting role |
| 2014 | Crystal Skulls | Melanie Cox | TV movie |
| 2015 | The Violators | Carla | Supporting role |
| 2017 | Habit | Alex | Supporting role |
| 2017 | Partners in Rhyme | Herself | Participant (2 episodes) |
| 2018 | Recoil | Suzie | Main role (short) |
| 2018 | Celebrity Ghost Hunt | Herself | Participant (2 episodes) |
| 2018 | Celebrity Big Brother | Herself | Participant (18 episodes) |
| 2018 | Celebrity Island with Bear Grylls | Herself | Participant (6 episodes) |
| 2018–2019 | Jeremy Vine | Herself | Panelist (2 episodes) |
| 2019 | Celebrity Coach Trip | Herself | Participant (3 episodes) |

== Radio ==
| Year | Title | Role | Notes |
|---|---|---|---|
| 2018 | Minster FM | Herself | Breakfast show co-host |

== Stage ==
| Year | Title | Role | Venue |
|---|---|---|---|
| 2009–2010 | Cinderella | Cinderella | Theatre Royal, Newcastle |
| 2010 | Rock Around the Clock | Corinne | UK tour (various locations) |
| 2010 | The Vagina Monologues | Various | UK tour (various locations) |
| 2011 | Satin 'n' Steel | Tina | Oldham Coliseum |
| 2013 | The Rocky Horror Picture Show | Janet Weiss | UK tour (various locations) |
| 2013 | Ladies Day | Shelley | Royal Court Theatre, Liverpool |
| 2014 | On the Piste | Bev | UK tour (various locations) |
| 2014–2015 | Beauty and the Beast | Belle | The Playhouse, Whitley Bay |
| 2016 | Some Girl(s) | Tyler | Park Theatre, London |
| 2016–2017 | The Wedding Singer | Holly | UK tour (various locations) |
| 2016–2017 | Dick Whittington | Alice Fitzwarren | Macron Stadium, Bolton |
| 2017–2018 | Jack and the Beanstalk | Jack | Ipswich Regent |

== Awards and nominations ==
| Year | Award | Category | Result | Ref. |
|---|---|---|---|---|
| 2006 | The British Soap Awards | Sexiest Female | Nominated | |
| 2007 | The British Soap Awards | Sexiest Female | Nominated | |
| 2008 | Digital Spy Soap Awards | Sexiest Female | Nominated | |
| 2008 | The British Soap Awards | Sexiest Female | Nominated | |
| 2008 | The British Soap Awards | Best Actress | Nominated | |
| 2008 | Inside Soap Awards | Best Actress | Nominated | |
| 2008 | Inside Soap Awards | Sexiest Female | Nominated | |
| 2009 | The British Soap Awards | Sexiest Female | Nominated | |

== See also ==
- List of Celebrity Big Brother (British TV series) housemates
- List of Dancing on Ice contestants
