= Diamonique =

Jewelry companies of the United States

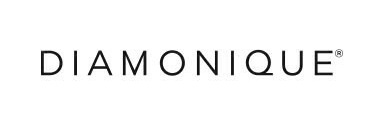
Logo used since 2010

Diamonique is the brand name used by television shopping network QVC for their cubic zirconia simulated colorless diamond, simulated colored diamond, and simulated colored gemstone jewelry (cubic zirconia is a common type of gemstone substitute). QVC acquired the manufacturing facilities, proprietary technology and trade name rights from MSB Industries, Inc. in 1988. Starting in April 2001, QVC began a limited distribution of Diamonique jewelry at Target retail locations. In the 1990s, Diamonique jewelry made up approximately 5% of QVC's sales. Sales of jewelry for QVC have naturally declined as the company has diversified their shopping programming.

On April 15, 2026, parent company QVC Group warned that it was preparing to file for Chapter 11 bankruptcy as soon as the end of that day, citing steadily viewer declines and debt burdens. QVC Group plans to enter a prepackaged restructuring support agreement with its creditors and exit Chapter 11 bankruptcy within no later than 90 days, or by around July 2026. On April 16, QVC Group filed for Chapter 11 bankruptcy protection in the United States District Court for the Southern District of Texas with plans to reduce over $5 billion in long-term debt, which will allow for the company to continue operating while having over $1 billion in debt remaining.

== Designers ==
Celebrities and fine jewelry designers have designed collections of Diamonique Jewelry for QVC.

- Morgan Fairchild
- Loni Anderson
- Carol Channing
- Judith Ripka
- Paul Klecka
- Tacori
- Erica Courtney
- Tova Borgnine
- Michelle Mone, Baroness Mone
- Scott Kay
- Netali Nissim
- Lisa P. Mason

== See also ==
- Diamond simulant
