= Black money scam =

Type of confidence trick; variation of what is known as advance fee fraud

The black money scam, sometimes also known as the "black dollar scam" or "wash wash scam", is a scam where con artists attempt to fraudulently obtain money from a victim by convincing them that piles of banknote-sized discoloured paper are real United States dollars that have been stained or dyed. Some scammers claim the money was dyed after it was seized by the Drug Enforcement Administration during investigations, and has been stained to prevent it being circulated back into the world economy. As a form of misdirection, the scammer will often assert that the money itself is worthless, thus the victim is persuaded to pay upfront fees to purchase expensive chemicals to remove the dye, with the promise of a share in the proceeds after all the money has been thoroughly cleaned. The black money scam is a variation of what is known as advance fee fraud.

== Chemicals used ==
A Ghanaian native caught perpetrating the scam revealed the tricks of the trade to ABC News Chief Investigative Correspondent Brian Ross. Authentic US$100 bills are first coated with a protective layer of glue, and then dipped into a solution of tincture of iodine to stain it completely black. The bill, when dried, looks and feels like black construction paper. From a mass of banknote-sized sheets of real construction paper, the victim is invited to pick a "note" at random for cleaning by the scammer, where it is then switched via sleight of hand with the iodine-coated US$100 bill. The scammer then sprays on a light coat of an unidentified chemical, which removes the dye to reveal the banknote. The "magic cleaning solution" is actually crushed vitamin C tablets dissolved in water. In another arrest, ordinary raspberry drink mix was found to be the "magic cleaning solution". Solutions of calcium hydroxide and magnesium hydroxide have also been used as washing agents in the scam.
