= Fay Presto =

British magician

Fay Presto (born 17 May 1948) is the stage name of Letitia Winter, a British magician and member of The Inner Magic Circle known for her close-up magic.

== Career ==
Winter's first job was as a lab assistant at an atomic energy research company, and she tried returning to study and working in sales before developing an interest in performing magic in her late thirties. She joined The Magic Circle, but was asked to leave when she began to transition. When The Magic Circle voted to allow women members in 1991, she was one of the first women to join.

As Presto, Winter specialises in close-up magic, and had held a residency at London's Langan's Brasserie since the start of her magic career. She is known for her "bottle through the table" trick, which was ranked as the 37th greatest magic trick of all time by Channel 4's 50 Greatest Magic Tricks.

Presto was part of the UK touring show Champions of Magic from 2014 to 2017, alongside fellow magicians Edward Hilsum, Alex McAleer and Young & Strange.

She was profiled in the BBC documentary series 40 Minutes in 1994 in the episode "Fay Presto: Illusions of Grandeur" directed by Sally George. In 2017, Presto was the subject of the documentary Fay Presto, the Queen of Close-up.

== Television appearances ==
Winter has appeared in a number of documentaries and played herself in cameo roles.

| Year | Title | Role | Notes |
|---|---|---|---|
| 1994 | Fay Presto: Illusions of Grandeur | Herself | |
| 1995 | The Car's The Star | Herself | Guest |
| 1995 | Paul Daniels' Secrets | Herself | |
| 1995 | The Late Late Show | Herself | Guest |
| 2000 | Heroes of Magic | Herself | |
| 2001 | Emmerdale | Herself | Cameo |
| 2002 | The Daily Show | Herself | Guest |
| 2002 | 50 Greatest Magic Tricks | Herself | |
| 2006 | The Story of Light Entertainment | Herself | |
| 2016 | When Magic Goes Horribly Wrong | Herself | |
| 2017 | Fay Presto, Queen of Close-up | Herself | |

== Awards and accolades ==
In 1998 Winter was voted "Party Entertainer of the Year" by Tatler Magazine.

In 2012 Winter won the title of The Magic Circle Close-up Magician of the Year 2012.

In 2024 awarded the David Berglas Award for "Outstanding Contribution to Magic by a British magician" by The British Magical Society.

== Personal life and charity work ==
Winter is a transgender woman, and regularly organises and performs in benefits to support the rights of women, children and the LGBT community. Before her transition, she performed in character as a female magician. She is an ambassador for Action for Children.
