= List of The Magicians (British TV series) episodes =

The Magicians is a British family entertainment television show, first broadcast throughout January 2011 on BBC One. During the course of the programme, 11 episodes of The Magicians aired over two series.

The show features magicians performing a number of magic tricks with guest celebrities, to decide which pair will face a forfeit trick at the end of the episode. In the first series, this was decided through audience participation; however, for the second series, a phone vote was introduced. The first series was hosted by Lenny Henry, and featured magicians Luis de Matos, Barry and Stuart and Chris Korn.

== Series overview ==
Series	Episodes	Originally released	
Series	Episodes	First released	Last released
1	5	1 January 2011	29 January 2011
2	6	7 January 2012	11 February 2012

== Episodes ==
=== Series 1 (2011) ===
- Winner: Luis De Matos (3 wins)
- Runner(s)-up: Barry and Stuart (2 wins)
- Loser: Chris Korn (No wins)

No. overall	No. in series	Theme	Forfeit	Original release date	UK viewers (millions)
1	1	Tricks involving a box	Walking on hot ashes, barefoot	1 January 2011	5.83
Barry and Stuart and Sian Williams: Grand Illusion, sword through box trick using crossbow bolts and javelins; Celebrity's Choice, mind-reading illusion; Street Magic, hand through stomach trick Luis de Matos and Ashley Banjo: Grand Illusion, Diversity appearing out of a small box; Celebrity's Choice, escapology trick involving a chest; Street Magic, making Ashley Banjo appear behind a coat on top of a park bench Chris Korn and Bruno Tonioli: Grand Illusion, Tonioli suspending Chris in a box over spikes; Celebrity's Choice, each of Chris and Bruno sawing an assistant in half; Street Magic, teleporting extracts from books from one London Eye pod to another
2	2	Transportation	Lying on a bed of nails whilst a motorbike rides across the chest	8 January 2011	5.52
Barry and Stuart and Adrian Edmondson: Grand Illusion, mind-reading prediction, including making a horse appear; Celebrity's Choice, blending and restoring a phone; Street Magic, spoon-on-nose trick, using a nail Luis de Matos and Peter Jones: Grand Illusion, making Peter's car disappear; Celebrity's Choice, escapology trick featuring a strait-jacket and chains; Street Magic, card trick, tearing it apart and making it vanish before reappearing inside an orange Chris Korn and Amanda Byram: Grand Illusion, making a car fly, making a helicopter appear; Celebrity's Choice, Victorian Mystery Box trick; Street Magic, card trick with mind reading
3	3	Animal Magic	Walking on broken glass and swords up a staircase	15 January 2011	5.58
Barry and Stuart and Stephen K Amos: Grand Illusion, "mind-poking", use of cards, making a camel appear with Amos sat on it; Celebrity's Choice, making Barry disappear; Street Magic, woman selects a card and then chooses a pack containing only that card from many packs suspended from a ceiling Luis de Matos and Chris Tarrant: Grand Illusion, making an animatronic dinosaur appear; Celebrity's Choice, card selection trick using a pool table; Street Magic, psychological; members of the public attempt to open a box by selecting keys Chris Korn and Samantha Womack: Grand Illusion, making many white rabbits appear from an apparently empty shed; Celebrity's Choice, Clearly Impossible - Chris sawing Samantha in half; Street Magic, passing a ticket through glass
4	4	Fairytales	Concrete smashed on chest. Performed on host Lenny Henry	22 January 2011	5.40
Barry and Stuart and Martin Kemp: Grand Illusion, Kemp makes a goldfish appear in a bowl, made an audience member put a needle 'supposedly' through Stuart's tongue, balancing Stuart on the tip of a sword and piercing him with it; Celebrity's Choice, transportation of Barry and Kemp from one box to another; Street Magic, card trick where a member of the public signs and shuffles a card back into the pack, and a restrained Kemp produces it from his mouth Luis de Matos and N-Dubz: Grand Illusion, 3 separate effects: disappearing Fazer’s chest and stomach, sawing Tulisa into eight, and shrinking Dappy; Celebrity's Choice, Luis and Tulisa making paper butterflies appear and remain airborne; Street Magic, set in a school, using Segways while blindfolded to correctly locate from many CD players the one playing N-Dubz's music Chris Korn and Rolf Harris: Grand Illusion, tricks based around Alice in Wonderland, using a member of the audience as Alice, including transporting a ring and making a bottle disappear; Celebrity's Choice, Rolf draws a person with features as selected by members of the audience, later shown by Chris to have been predicted on a scroll, and a model appears wearing the same items as in the painting; Street Magic, Rolf draws a spider on a web, Chris disappears the spider from the drawing, and a fake spider appears on the back of the person's hand (Chris Korn was supposed to be on the hurdles, with Rolf Harris smashing the concrete, but due to a hernia sustained in rehearsals, Chris was unable to do the forfeit. As such, Rolf also claimed he had an injury, so Lenny Henry suggested that he take Chris' place, and a member of the stagecrew stepped in to smash the concrete.)
5	5	Fright Night	Bending an iron pole by pressing it into their necks and running towards each other	29 January 2011	5.90
Barry and Stuart and Angela Griffin: Grand Illusion, Story of the McCrae family, with Angela tied up and placed behind curtains which were closed and opened, showing once with the stage demolished, second with Angela with a coat on with maggots everywhere & third with 6 people appearing, and throwing 'maggots' into the crowd; Celebrity's Choice, Angela had been made to appear out of nowhere in a box, audience was then shown the same trick again but with an infrared camera to see through the box panels, but then came to know that Angela wasn't in the box, but sitting next to Lenny; Street Magic, Barry & Stuart approached someone in a library and asked them to type in their email into their phone, sending them an email containing a YouTube link. They then asked her to choose 8 books from random and choose one from the ones chosen. Then, they played the YouTube link, showing Angela reading out the book chosen by the member of the public. Luis de Matos and Neil Morrissey: Grand Illusion, A card trick in which an audience member identified a card were placed in a 1000L box of water. Luis was suspended within it to try to find the card, disappearing from it and reappearing at the back of the studio; Celebrity's Choice, Neil lying down on a plank of wood and being levitated by Luis; Street Magic, Neil showed members of the public how to easily see to the backs of cupboards, by moving Luis' neck halfway down his body without him bending over Chris Korn and George and Larry Lamb: Grand Illusion, George was tied to a bed with a panel of nails hovering above him ready to fall. When they do, curtains are dropped and George appears on top of the nail panel. (An effect known as the table of death); Celebrity's Choice, An audience member identified a paintball and Chris was strapped into a device that prevented him from moving. George then proceeded to fire the paintball through a panel towards Chris, and Chris caught the paintball in his teeth; Street Magic, Chris showed off some sleight of hand magic in a bingo hall, transporting coins from George and Larry's hands.

=== Series 2 (2012) ===
- Winner: Jason Latimer (3 wins)
- Runner(s)-up: Barry and Stuart (2 wins)
- Loser: Pete Firman (1 win)

No. overall	No. in series	Forfeit	Original release date	UK viewers (millions)
6	1	Eating fire and gurgling molten metal	7 January 2012	5.27
Barry and Stuart and Tyger Drew-Honey and Daniel Roche: Grand Illusion, Making Barry and Stuart appear from an empty sealed box in the guise of two ghosts; Location Grand Illusion, Asking a woman to choose a random CD from an HMV store and then creating subliminal art prediction using Joe McElderry; Close-Up Magic, Using predictions made using Facebook or Twitter to create a card sequence trick; Street Magic, Making a volunteer's worst insect nightmare appear in their cup of coffee on the London docks. Jason Latimer and Flavia Cacace: Grand Illusion, Turned a laser beam of light into a solid object. (Hanging objects on it, bending it, breaking it, and manipulating it like a staff); Location Grand Illusion, Latimer and Flavia perform a "relay race escape" attempting to escape from wooden boxes to free their teammate in another wooden box before a bus plows into them; Close-Up Magic, Pulling coins through a solid handkerchief visibly; Street Magic, Drew a deck of cards on LATIMER's arm then made the drawing animate on his skin as a selected card rose out of the drawing. Pete Firman and Keith Duffy: Grand Illusion, A role-reversal illusion with Keith as the magician and Pete as the 'assistant'; Location Grand Illusion, Using a rubber 'crystal ball' to create a mind-reading prediction using a piece of laundry; Close-Up Magic, A sleight of hand trick using sausages; Street Magic, Making a glass pitcher break via a mental "high note". Guest act: Eric Giliam and Hiroki Hara
7	2	Walking barefoot up a staircase of swords, and then lying on your back on top of another set of swords, whilst a monk slices a watermelon on your stomach	14 January 2012	N/A
Barry and Stuart and Craig Revel Horwood: Grand Illusion, A guillotine trick, removing Craig's head and making it re-appear, with added party blowers; Location Grand Illusion, Sending Craig over a cliff, locked in the boot of a car, making the car explode, and then making Craig re-appear on a helicopter; Close-Up Magic, Using 'The Pirate Shuffle' dance to re-create an age old card trick with a musical twist, against Barry and Stuart's will (with pre-recorded messages halfway in to give the audience a laugh at Barry and Stuart's expense). Jason Latimer and David Hasselhoff: Grand Illusion, A modern-day variation of the "powers of Darkness," using a series of female assistants, with David as a "magic ninja" secretly assisting Latimer without a spectator knowing; Location Grand Illusion, A prediction using a series of letters on randomly thrown out T-shirts and the car appearance of KITT the car from Knight Rider; Close-Up Magic, Using the audience to break a world record in which a mass number of people all reach the end of a sequence of cards, despite starting in different positions with different cards, each making different choices, Latimer and the David Hasselhoff find millions of different cards at the same time; Street Magic: Hasselhoff reveals his prediction of a freely selected card by burning his predications and rubbing the ashes on his arm and it magically spells out the name of the card. Latimer then burns his prediction "accidentally" burning his skin causing a blister on his finger tips that take the shape of a "K" on one finger and a figure of a "Club" on the other. Pete Firman and Julia Bradbury: Grand Illusion, Passing Julia through an industrial fan with the aid of a fake protection spray named "Firmanite"; Location Grand Illusion, Using a bandstand and a marching band in Battersea park to predict a song a member of the public is thinking of; Close-Up Magic, Using a drawing pad to make a prediction as to an animal that a member of the audience is thinking of. Guest act: Michael Halvarson
8	3	Lying on a bed of nails, whilst a second bed is placed on top, and six audience members walk across it, crushing it into your stomach	21 January 2012	N/A
Barry and Stuart and David Haye: Grand Illusion, Sawing a female assistant into nine pieces using blades piercing through the top of a sealed box; Location Grand Illusion, Using a member of the public, and mind-reading using lights on a building in Canary Wharf; Close-Up Magic, Turning a glass of water into a glass of wine, and then turning it back into water again; Street Magic, Creating a tattoo on a man's arm based on a special person he was thinking about. Jason Latimer and Kimberly Wyatt: Grand Illusion, Performing Jason Latimer's "Perfect Picture" levitation with Kimberley. Latimer levitated Kimberly up into the air while the entire scene on stage rotated 360 degrees, giving audiences a full view from every angle; Location Grand Illusion, Kimberly walked on the surface of water at Marble Arch fountain. Latimer walked out on the water then performed his "Fountain Walk" effect where he uses water jets as stepping stones; Close-Up Magic, Visually turned a whole deck of cards one by one into the design of one particular card, chosen by an audience member; Street Magic, Jason LATIMER and Kimberly went to a pub in London and proceeded to push items through a glass table. Kimberly pressed a straw through glass, while Latimer pressed his drink through the glass table surface. Pete Firman and Mel Giedroyc: Grand Illusion, Asking a member of the audience to choose from a number of different fruits, and then creating a cabaret performance based around it; Location Grand Illusion, Moving through a wall of tinned baked beans without any of the tins falling or moving out of place; Close-Up Magic, Asking the audience to pick a sequence of four cards, and then by using mind-reading, re-creating the sequence; Street Magic, Taking a woman's a mobile phone from an envelope and moving it to an arcade machine on Brighton Pier. Guest act: Juliana Chen
9	4	Walking barefoot across some broken glass and then having some concrete smashed on their head	28 January 2012	4.31
Barry and Stuart and Tina Hobley: Grand Illusion, A fake box trick, moving Tina around, ending with Tina reappearing out of the first box; Location Grand Illusion, A series of tricks based a disused hospital, with a ghost-hunting style-show theme; Close-Up Magic, Making a real-life bowling ball appear from a 2D drawing on a large jotter pad; Street Magic, Holding a frog in the hand, making it disappear and then making it re-appear in the mouth. Jason Latimer and Myleene Klass: Grand Illusion, Matter illusion trick, involving Latimer dancing with a dress, making it come 'alive' and making Myleene appear inside it; Location Grand Illusion, Being locked in a chamber, being lowered into a river and then escaping to safety on a bridge; Close-Up Magic, Latimer and Myleene pointed out a prediction in a glass jar that would not be touched by anyone till the end of the effect. Latimer proceeded to randomly find audience members by launching three T-shirts into the audience to have each volunteer call out a colour, a suit, and a value. Myleene revealed the prediction inside the glass jar was the selected card; Street Magic, Making a chosen card from a deck of fifty-two reappear beneath the sealed ice of an ice rink. Pete Firman and Adam Woodyatt: Grand Illusion, A series of cabaret tricks in the style of 50's duo Sigfreid and Roy, including a magic assistant act; Location Grand Illusion, Using a number of different cars and vehicles to create a matching prediction trick; Close-Up Magic, Any Drink Called For; turning a carton of orange juice into a series of different alcoholic and non-alcoholic drinks; Street Magic, Asking a member of the public to think of an animal and making it appear inside a sealed box. Guest act: David and Dania
10	5	Having an apple shot off of their head by an archer on a rotating turntable.	4 February 2012	5.16
Barry and Stuart and John Torode and Gregg Wallace: Grand Illusion, A 'Find the pea' trick, switching and make a person disappear beneath three different places; Location Grand Illusion, With John dangling from the top of the building, Stuart makes a mobile phone vanish and reappear in John's lunch bag; Close-Up Magic, Mind-reading with the home and studio audience using a selection of different foods on a circular chart; Street Magic, John and Gregg transmitting taste via 'magic gum' to a volunteer. Jason Latimer and Phil Tufnell: Grand Illusion, Passing objects through a solid mirror using a volunteer, ending with a relative of the volunteer appearing; Location Grand Illusion, Prediction based on a large mural which has been created over three days by members of the public; Close-Up Magic, A child choosing a card from a deck of fifty-two, it disappearing, and then re-appearing in a sealed glass box with Latimer inside; Street Magic, Linking rings using the stem and bowl of a standard wine glass. Pete Firman and Arlene Phillips: Grand Illusion, Locking Arlene in a chamber, making her disappear and then making her re-appear; Location Grand Illusion, Making a donkey disappear on Weymouth beach, and re-appear on a bandstand a mile away; Close-Up Magic, A 'Find your card' trick with an audience member acting as the magician and Pete as the volunteer; Street Magic, Making a ring vanish and reappear in a duck on a hook a duck stand. Guest act: Les Chapeaux Blancs
11	6	Bending an iron bar in their mouths and breaking an arrow against a wall with their necks.	11 February 2012	N/A
Barry and Stuart and Ed Byrne: Grand Illusion, Making Ed Byrne appear inside a box whilst 'revealing' how it's done; Location Grand Illusion, Ed bungee jumping in Magna, with Barry & Stuart cutting and repairing his rope using magic; Close-Up Magic, Using piranha fish to predict the answer to a question; Street Magic, Using a mini-moto bike to pick one card out of a possible 156 cards. Jason Latimer and George Sampson: Grand Illusion, Shaping water into three dimensional shapes; Location Grand Illusion, Making five people on a trailer lorry disappear and re-appear on another lorry; Close-Up Magic, Using a man's wedding ring to hold up an entire glass box; Street Magic, Turning airport flyers into twenty pound notes. Pete Firman and Joe Swash: Grand Illusion, Using the Tan-O-Matic 3000 to turn Joe into an old man; Location Grand Illusion, A prediction trick using animals at the London Aquarium; Close-Up Magic, Eating a maggot, regurgitating it and making it appear in the eye socket; Street Magic, Making a chosen card appear on the inside of a shop window. Guest act: Hans Klok
