= Piff the Magic Dragon =

British magician and comedian (born 1980)

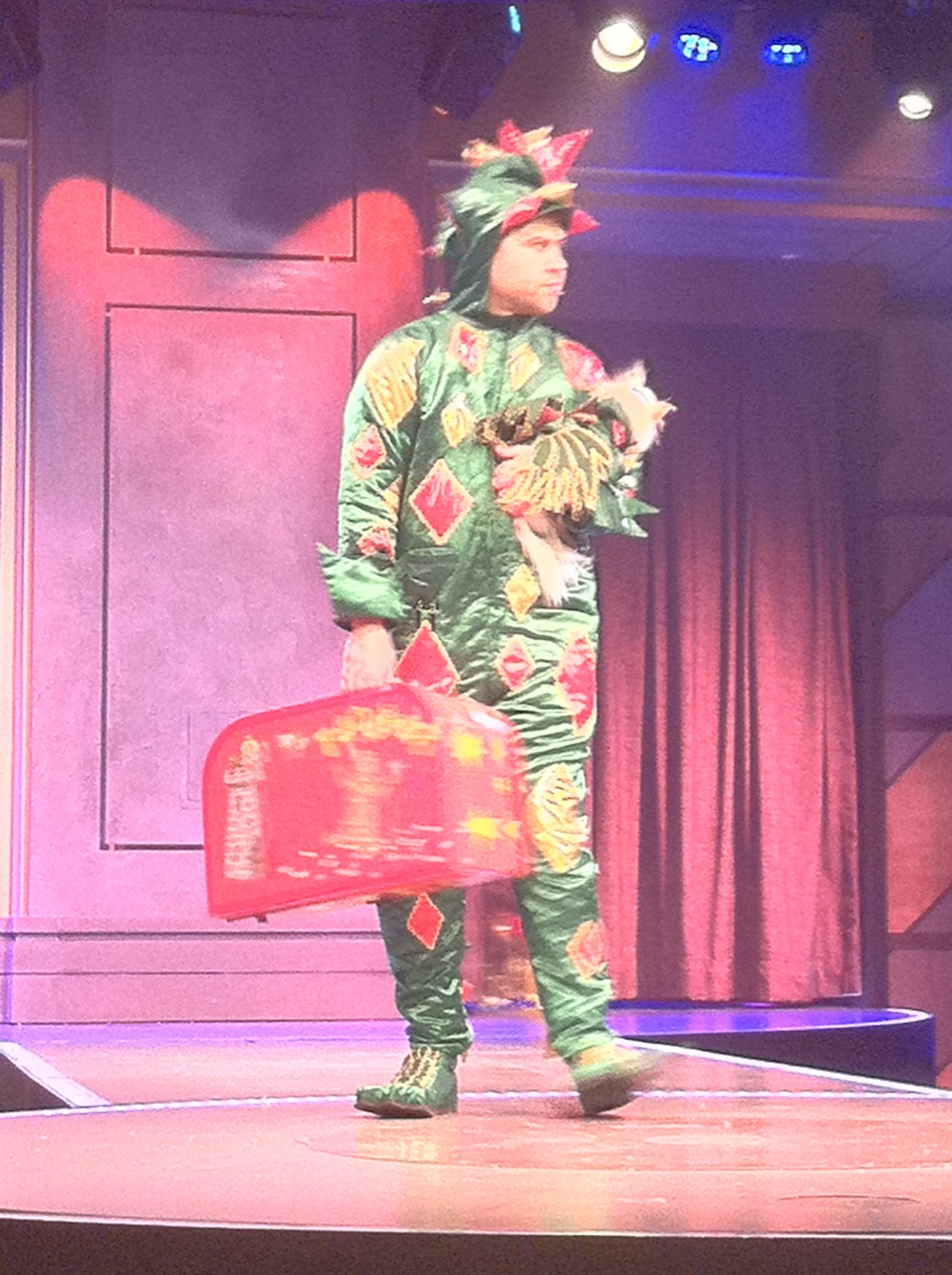
- Van der Put on stage, in 2014
- Born: John van der Put; 9 June 1980 (age 46); London, England
- Occupations: Magician, comedian
- Spouse: Jade Simone
- Website: piffthemagicdragon.com

John van der Put (born 9 June 1980) is an English magician and comedian, who performs under the stage name Piff the Magic Dragon. A winner of multiple awards from British magic societies, he toured as a supporting act for Mumford and Sons and has appeared on Penn & Teller: Fool Us and America's Got Talent. In June 2019, van der Put was named one of Variety's 10 Comics to Watch for 2019. Van der Put lives in Las Vegas and has a residency at The Flamingo.

== Early life and career ==
Van der Put grew up in South East London. As a teenager, he was inspired to become a magician after seeing Jerry Sadowitz on the BBC2 show Stuff the White Rabbit. At the age of 18, he became a member of The Magic Circle, and was one of the youngest members to have lectured there.

His parents persuaded him to have a back-up career, so he completed a Computer Science degree, and began a career in IT. After two years, a bout of acute pancreatitis caused him to rethink his life goals, and he quit IT to learn performance methods as a drama student at the Central School of Speech and Drama.

With fellow alumni of the CSSD Alexis Terry, Maya Politaki, and Lucy Cullingford, he co-founded the theatrical cabaret company standnotamazed, becoming their artistic director. The company's Love and Other Magic Tricks, starring Politaki and van der Put and described in a WhatsOnStage review as "a show of subtlety and magic rather than drama and showmanship", won the Time Out Critic's Choice award as well as the 2009 Buxton Festival Fringe's award for Best Production, and was nominated for the Festival's Best New Writing award. Van der Put also had a supporting role in Derek Walcott's 2008 operatic production of Seamus Heaney's The Burial at Thebes at Shakespeare's Globe.

Van der Put credits Fay Presto for enabling him to become a professional magician. Jobs included restaurant close-up performances for tables of diners; cruise ship work; and corporate work including "product launches, PR stunts, tradeshows and internal presentations" for global companies.

=== Comedy vs. magic ===
Regarding his earlier pre-Piff magician career, asked whether or not it was a comedy act also, van der Put said "Not intentionally. It was me doing magic tricks. And then sort of people would say ridiculous things, like, 'Can you make my wife disappear? Can you do this? Can you do that?' And I would make a comment to them that I would think was funny, and a couple of people would think was funny, but most people would just get offended. So, the dragon outfit definitely helped make me socially acceptable."

Regarding his comedic influences, van der Put said "It was the people who are a little more irreverent. It was people like The Amazing Johnathan, Penn and Teller, Harry Anderson … and also if you look at some of the Copperfield stuff, like with the singing tie, he's got amazingly funny routines as well. But obviously, the other stuff that Copperfield does is very straight and serious. And that was what I was reacting against."

And when asked which is harder, doing the magic or getting the comedy right, van der Put said: "It is, without question, getting the magic tricks to work. That is the hardest bit. Because for the comedy, you can rewrite a joke pretty quickly, but to make a magic trick work it's usually at least a month or two in R&D prototyping. And if it doesn't work, then you have to really go back to the drawing board. Because now you spent all this time on something that nobody even cares about. So, you have to start again."

== As Piff ==
In 2008, van der Put created his stage persona of Piff the Magic Dragon, dressing in a green, red and yellow dragon costume, with self-deprecating humour and deadpan delivery. He is assisted by "Mr. Piffles", a chihuahua in a dragon costume. The Magic Dragon persona was created by happenstance, when he went to a costume party in a dragon outfit, and nobody else turned up in costume. "It was just me. And one of my friends who knew that I was a magician said to me, 'You should do this in your act. You could be Puff the Magic Dragon.' And I said, 'Wait, I could be Piff the Magic Dragon. You might have heard of my older brother, Steve.' And that's where that came from."

When asked in an interview why he is a dragon, and not some other mythological being, van der Put responded:

The first question is, "Am I even a dragon?" Because, well I don't have wings … I can't even fly. So, I don't know. What happened was: I was a regular human magician for many years. And it never really worked out for me … I had a sort of very grumpy face, and I was getting fired everywhere. And then I had to go to a costume party, and I didn't have a costume to wear and I said to my sister, "Do you have anything to wear?" And she said, "Yes, I have a dragon outfit under my bed. So, the fact that it's even a dragon outfit is solely down to my sister and her interpretation of the facts. And, I did ask her recently, ten years later, I did ask her, "Was it definitely a dragon outfit?," and she could not authenticate that. So, it was definitely some sort of lizardy, reptile-ish creature that I prefer to look at as a dragon.

Piff the Magic Dragon has appeared regularly in shows at the Edinburgh Fringe, debuting at the 2009 Free Fringe Festival with a solo show that broke the record for highest takings in one night, and being nominated for the inaugural 2012 Time Out and Soho Theatre Cabaret Award. His show at the 2009 Buxton Fringe won the award for Best Comedy Show the same year that Love and Other Magic Tricks won. He has had national tours of the UK and Australia, including runs at the Soho Theatre and Sydney Opera House.

Regarding the origin of Mr. Piffles, van der Put said:

There was a Chihuahua when I was in Edinburgh in 2009, and I put that dog in my show. And it was so funny, I went out the next day and I got Mr. Piffles. And, so I didn't really think about it. And then you know, eventually I started seeing dinosaur costumes for dogs. So, we put him in a dinosaur costume. And then it was just really funny to me, when people are saying "So you're a genuine magic dragon?" And I would say "Yes." And then they'd say, "So, is the dog a dragon too?" I'd say "No, it's just a dog in a dragon outfit." Having that sort of play was funny to me.

In 2011, Piff appeared on the first season of Penn & Teller: Fool Us with a phased transformation of incorrect card to signed card, a performance that according to Metro saw him "steal the show" with a routine that would "have been as welcome on a small stage at a comedy festival as it would a Vegas stage". Although his card trick segment of the performance fooled Penn and Teller initially, the pair seemed to figure it out and were therefore "not fooled" by Piff's own admission on stage. Penn subsequently revealed the method they gave on air was "kinda sorta wrong" and Piff just played along. The duo rated the act their favourite of the season, and Piff "a stunningly good magician". The routine was subsequently voted onto Channel 5's TV's 50 Greatest Magic Tricks. The next year, his routine was plagiarised by a Ukrainian magician on the Russian TV3 show Surprise Me! (Russian: Удиви меня!).

As Piff, van der Put was a support act for band Mumford & Sons on their 2012 Tour of Two Halves. The band first discovered him when they both appeared in the benefit concert The Secret Policeman's Ball 2012, and included him in their Galway Gentlemen of the Road stopover and on the cover of their album Babel. Together with his other 2012 performances, these appearances made him the UK magician seen live on stage by the most people that year.

Van der Put moved to Las Vegas to join The Cosmopolitan's Rose. Rabbit. Lie club and its 2014 Spiegelworld Vegas Nocturne show, having been headhunted while on tour in Australia. In December of that year, he opened for Human Nature's December 2014 Christmas shows at The Venetian.

In May 2015, Piff appeared on the 10th season of NBC's America's Got Talent. His audition, a repeat of his Fool Us routine with a phased transformation of incorrect card to signed card, was unanimously selected for the Judge Cuts round. In that round, a signed card reappeared in a sealed dog-food can, with special guest judge Neil Patrick Harris using his Golden Buzzer to send Piff straight to the quarterfinals. In the quarterfinals, three hanging boxes selected by judge Howie Mandel were violently destroyed, while the fourth unselected box was revealed to contain Mr. Piffles. This received sufficient votes to send him to the semifinals, where his revelations of three selected cards earned him standing ovations from judges Howard Stern, Heidi Klum and Howie Mandel, and sufficient votes for the final round. That week's act, which involved firing Mr. Piffles from a cannon and the reappearance of a signed bill inside a walnut, did not receive enough votes for him to win, and instead placed him in the Top 10. He returned as a guest performer on AGT's 2016 America's Got Talent Holiday Spectacular and in 2017 during Season 12.

In late 2015, van der Put became the resident performer at The Flamingo, and The Flamingo renamed its "Bugsy's Cabaret" theater as the "Piff the Magic Dragon Theater". He is assisted by showgirl and real-life partner Jade Simone.

In October 2020, Piff's show relocated to the much larger (700 seat) Flamingo Showroom with a three-year contract.

van der Put appeared in the ninth season of Queer Eye in 2024 when he was nominated by Simone, as well as fellow magicians Penn & Teller.

In November 2024, Piff announced that his canine companion Mr. Piffles had died at nearly 17 years of age, but he had paid for a genetic clone, Mr Piffles the Second.

== Consultant work ==
Van der Put served as consultant to Penn and Teller, and helped develop the Vanishing African Spotted Pygmy Elephant Act. He also served as a magic consultant for the theatre company Theatre-Rites, for their production of Mojo, as well as to Heston Blumenthal, who said van der Put worked on magic water for his restaurant The Fat Duck: "When two people ask for still and sparkling, we'll pour it from the same bottle without any physical divide."

== Religious beliefs ==
Van der Put grew up as an evangelical Christian, and performed Gospel magic when younger. When asked his opinion in an interview regarding the claim of some religious fundamentalists that dragons were actually fire-breathing dinosaurs, van der Put said:

I mean, what do you do? What do you do with so many of their arguments? There are so many. I've got very good friends still in that world, and also, I've personally really benefited from it. I've had some very, very good friends do very great things for me in my life, from that world. So, there is definitely a big positive side. But like you say, some of it is ludicrous. And a lot of it is incredibly damaging.

On the subject of religion, van der Put also said: "So, my joke with Penn [Jillette] is always that at some point he's going to be renouncing his atheism and jump on the God bandwagon. [Laughs] But the truth is that … you know, it's that thing about the older you get, the less you know."

== Awards ==
Van der Put won the 2008 British Ring Close-up Magician of the Year, while The Magic Circle awarded him their 2011 Close-up Magician of the Year, 2012 Stage Magician of the Year (as Piff), and 2013 Carlton Award. In 2013, the Circle also inducted him into their Inner Ring with Gold Star. In 2023, he was awarded Academy of Magical Arts Magician of the Year.
