= List of The Magicians episodes =

List of The Magicians episodes may refer to:

- List of The Magicians (British TV series) episodes
- List of The Magicians (American TV series) episodes
