= TV's 50 Greatest Magic Tricks =

- Genre: Clip show Documentary; Entertainment
- Directed by: Helen Albon
- Narrated by: Fay Ripley
- Country of origin: United Kingdom

Production
- Executive producers: Matt Crook; Anthony Owen; Andrew Newman
- Producer: Helen Albon
- Camera setup: Single-camera
- Production company: Objective

Original release
- Network: Channel 5
- Release: 31 December 2011

TV's 50 Greatest Magic Tricks is a one-off list show that was produced by Objective Productions for Channel 5. The programme counts down the fifty greatest magic tricks – The Magic Bullet by Penn & Teller is the illusion at number one. The show was presented by the British actress Fay Ripley, and was directed by Helen Albon. TV's 50 Greatest Magic Tricks was first broadcast on Channel 5 on 31 December 2011. The list of magic tricks features set pieces, stunts and rabbit-out-of-the-hat tricks. Contributors to the programme included Penn & Teller, Paul Daniels and Dynamo. Two tricks by the British magician Pete Firman featured in the list, with his Goldfish Trick in the top ten.

== Magic tricks ==
1. The Magic Bullet (Penn & Teller, 1996)
2. Death Saw (David Copperfield)
3. Russian Roulette (Derren Brown, 2003)
4. Chop Cup (Paul Daniels, 1985)
5. The Cardboard Box Illusion (Shahid & Lisa Malik, 2000)
6. Walking on Water (Dynamo, 2011)
7. Goldfish Trick (Pete Firman, 2005)
8. Challenge of the Death Dive (Robert Gallup, 1996)
9. Cigarette Routine (Tom Mullica, 1996)
10. Quick Change (David & Dania, 2006)
11. Blended Mouse (Pete Firman, 2005)
12. Metamorphosis (The Pendragons, 1983)
13. Shoe Trick (John Lenahan, 2003)
14. Dream (Siegfried & Roy, 1994)
15. Torn and Restored Newspaper (The Great Soprendo, 1982)
16. Guillotine (Simon Drake, 1992)
17. Pool Shark (Paul Zenon, 2000)
18. The Tube Experiment (Derren Brown, 2001)
19. Iron Maiden (Paul Daniels, 1987)
20. Hummer Illusion, (Franz Harary, 2006)
21. Spreadwave (Mathieu Bich, 2011)
22. Coin Trick (Criss Angel, 2005)
23. Houdini's Water Torture Escape (Ali Cook, 2002)
24. Truck Trick (Penn & Teller, 1990)
25. Levitation (David Blaine)
26. Card Manipulation (An Ha Lim)
27. Pulse Stopping (David Berglas, 1986)
28. Motorcycle Illusion (Doug Henning, 1983)
29. Snowball Trick (Dynamo, 2011)
30. Flying (David Copperfield)
31. Sawing in Half (Kevin James, 2007)
32. Goldfish Transformation (Criss Angel)
33. Silhouette (Simon Drake, 1992)
34. Homunculus (Barry & Stuart, 2005)
35. Tax Disc Trick (Paul Zenon, 2000)
36. Doves (Lance Burton, 1982)
37. Interlude (Siegfried & Roy)
38. Floating Lightbulb (Harry Blackstone Jr., 1986)
39. Toe Cards (Ali Cook, 2002)
40. Signed and Restored Card (Piff the Magic Dragon, 2011)
41. Spoon Bending (Uri Geller, 1983)
42. Card Revelation (David Blaine)
43. Portal (David Copperfield)
44. Any Card at Any Number (Marc Paul, 2002)
45. One Million Pound Vanish (Paul Daniels, 1984)
46. 673 King Street (James Galea, 2009)
47. Bottle Glass (Tommy Cooper, 1971)
48. Tower Bridge Vanish (Franz Harary, 2004)
49. Miser's Dream (Penn & Teller, 2011)
50. Floating Guitar (Dynamo, 2011)

== Reception ==
Following the original broadcast in 2011, Channel 5 repeated TV's 50 Greatest Magic Tricks multiple times, including in 2012 and 2013. When broadcast in 2012, the programme achieved an average of one million viewers and an audience share of 3.9%.
