= The Story of Light =

The Story of Light may refer to:

- The Story of Light (Steve Vai album), 2012
- The Story of Light (Shinee album), 2018
- The Story of Light Entertainment, British documentary series
