= Monkey Magic (British TV series) =

UK television program

Monkey Magic was a magic show on Channel 5 in the UK, produced by Objective Productions, that ran for 2 series between 2003 and 2004. It was nominated for The Golden Rose of Montreux.

The show was made up of short tricks and stunts by magicians Jonathan Goodwin, Pete Firman, Ali Cook and Pete McCahon.
