= Alex McAleer =

British mentalist and magician (b. 1986)

- Born: February 5, 1986 (age 40)
- Occupations: Mind Reader and Mentalist
- Website: www.alexmcaleer.com

Alex McAleer is a British mentalist and magician. He is known for combining elements of psychology, showmanship, mentalism, and comedy in his performances. He has appeared on television in the UK, Australia, and the US, and toured internationally as part of the ensemble magic show Champions of Magic from 2013 to 2023.

== Career ==
McAleer has performed across the UK, Europe, the United States, and Canada. He was a featured performer in the touring production Champions of Magic from 2013 to 2023, which played major venues including the Hammersmith Apollo in London and the Palace Theatre in Cleveland, Ohio.

In 2014, McAleer performed his solo show Alex the Mind Reader at the Edinburgh Festival Fringe. He has also performed internationally at festivals including the Perth Fringe World Festival in Australia, where he was nominated for a Cabaret Award.

His television appearances include segments on ITV's Good Morning Britain (UK), Seven Network's Today Tonight (Australia), and NBC's Access Hollywood (USA).

In addition to performing, McAleer has written books on mentalism and lectured for magicians and performers, including appearances at The Magic Circle in London.

== Notable performances ==
- Champions of Magic tour (2013–2023), including performances at the Hammersmith Apollo (London), Fox Theatre (Detroit), and Palace Theatre (Cleveland).
- Alex the Mind Reader – Solo show at the Edinburgh Festival Fringe (2014).
- Perth Fringe World Festival, Australia – nominated for a Cabaret Award (2017).
- Television appearance on ITV’s Good Morning Britain demonstrating memory techniques.

== Personal life ==
McAleer is based in East Anglia.

He has a son called Jack. He also does magic.
