= Barry and Stuart =

Scottish magic and comedy act

- Known for: Magic; Comedy; Sketch comedy
- Website: No active website currently owned by them

Barry Jones and Stuart MacLeod are a duo of Scottish BAFTA-nominated magicians and comedians whose work has been seen on television and on stage around the world. The double act are known for their comically dark performing style, for taking as inspiration the accounts of Biblical miracles and faking paranormal phenomena to form the basis for some of their illusions.

== Biography ==
Jones was born on 16 April 1982 in Aberdeen and grew up in Portlethen, Scotland. MacLeod was born in 1980 in the town of Peterhead in Aberdeenshire, Scotland. MacLeod attended Peterhead Academy before studying philosophy and psychology at Aberdeen University, while Jones grew up in Old Portlethen, before moving to London to study multimedia computing.

They met in Aberdeen in 1994 and started making videos of themselves performing magic. This is where their double act style of acting out scenes in character while performing illusions developed. The filmed results of these magic sketches eventually reached a television production company and led to the making of their first TV series Magick. The show was nominated as Best Comedy Series at the Rose d'Or international television awards in Montreux in 2004.

In 2005 they hosted the television series Dirty Tricks and television special When Magic Tricks go Wrong and in 2006 the pair created two one-hour specials for Channel 4, Tricks from the Bible and The Magic of Jesus where they took inspiration from and duplicated the miracles described in the Old and New Testament.

In 2009, Jones and MacLeod were awarded the 'Best Comedy Illusionist' Award at the World Magic Awards.

They have toured the UK extensively throughout from 2010 with their live shows as well as performing at the Edinburgh Festival Fringe with new shows between 2008 and 2011.

In 2011 and 2012 they were part of both seasons of BBC1's The Magicians, a live magic show drawing in over 6 million viewers weekly. They most recently made The Happenings – four one-hour specials for Watch in which the duo use their magic to fake paranormal events.

== Television ==
=== Magick ===
Jones and MacLeod's first television series Magick (aka Sick Ticks also, Crack Magick) debuted on 5 October 2003 and was described as "comedy magic featuring surreal characters in bizarre and uncomfortable situations." It began airing in Australia on SBS on 1 February 2007 under the title Sick Tricks.

This series featured reverse film magic, where the magic was performed backwards and the film later reversed to reveal the backmasking.

In one of a series of 'crimes' caught on CCTV, footage captures two men being caught en flagrante in a public toilet by a police officer. To get out of trouble, one of the men hides the other behind his coat and makes him disappear. In another incident, a man breaks into a car by sticking his hand through a glass window without breaking it.

Secret filming in a supermarket captures MacLeod and Jones magically sabotaging the products by putting dead insects into sealed bottles of mineral water and penetrating razor blades through the foil lids of ready-meals.

In 2004 this four-part series was nominated for a Rose D'Or comedy award in Montreux.

=== Dirty Tricks ===
Dirty Tricks is a six-part series that was hosted by Jones and MacLeod. It was described as "magic meets Natural Born Killers." The show also had regular spots from Pete Firman, Ali Cook and Jonathan Goodwin as well as guest appearances from international variety acts and celebrities including Penn & Teller and Kevin James.

At the end of every show, the presenters "kill" the radio and TV presenter Neil Fox in a horrific and painful manner. This includes him being cremated, stabbed and crushed.

=== The Magic of Jesus ===
This one-hour special aired over the Christmas holiday period in December 2005. In this show Jones and MacLeod drew inspiration from the accounts of Jesus' miracles in the New Testament to present illusions which included apparently walking on the surface of water in a glass tank, turning water into wine, causing a blind person to temporarily 'see', appearing to raise a deceased person, causing a virgin to apparently become 'pregnant' and feeding 5000 people.

=== Tricks from the Bible ===
Following on from The Magic of Jesus this one-hour special aired in June 2006. The duo drew inspiration from the miracle accounts in the Old Testament. Jones and MacLeod performed illusions such as turning staffs into snakes in Egypt, exactly where it was said to be performed in the Old Testament, casting some of the plagues of Egypt on two fans in an enclosed part of a restaurant, a transformation into a pillar of salt, exorcism of a demon, robbing a man of his strength as Samson had, apparently raising someone from the dead and pulling a coin from the mouth of a fish, performed on a boat in the Red Sea.

=== The Magicians ===
The Magicians is a BBC primetime show, that aired its first series during January 2011. It featured Barry and Stuart alongside host Lenny Henry and fellow magicians Luis de Matos and Chris Korn. The show returned for its second series on 7 January 2012, with Barry and Stuart being the only personalities retained from series one. The second series featured two new magicians alongside Barry and Stuart; American magician Jason Latimer and English magician Pete Firman. This second series was broadcast live and was the first magic series to do so in the UK in 30 years

=== The Happenings ===
In December 2013 Barry and Stuart's latest show, The Happenings, a four x 60 min series debuted in the UK on the digital channel Watch HD. The duo went undercover as they set about making the unbelievable paranormal-like events believable to the unsuspecting residents of towns across the UK and America.

Each episode was a self-contained narrative and featured their magic and illusion under the guise of mysterious incidents that were played out over the course of a few weeks in four towns. Episodes featured, ghosts, vampires, aliens and government cover-ups. A number of events filmed for the program made national headlines including their faked ghost sighting and alien landing.

The program was first broadcast internationally in April 2014 on the National Geographic Channel.

== Theatre ==
In 2008 the duo took their debut live show Part Time Warlocks to the Edinburgh Festival Fringe. Following 5 star reviews and a total sell out run, extra dates of the show were staged in a larger venue. In 2009 they returned to the Edinburgh Fringe with a new show Powered by Demons which they later performed at the Soho Theatre, London. Returning to the Edinburgh Festival Fringe in 2010 they performed 98% Séance, a show where they used their magic to fake ghostly apparitions under the guise of a séance. In a five-star review, Time Out London described the show as "a triumph of astonishing illusions, inventive technology, and unexpected frights." This show was the most positively tweeted about show at the Edinburgh Fringe 2010 according to the Realtime, crowd-sourced review website, EdTwinge.

They toured the UK in spring 2010 with Barry and Stuart: Live. In 2011 they performed two shows at the Edinburgh Festival Fringe, The Show and The Tell. In The Show they performed an hour of magic, then a limited number of that audience had the chance to buy tickets for The Tell where they would witness the explanations to the all tricks they had just witnessed. In 2012 they toured the UK with Show and Tell, a joint version of the two separate Edinburgh shows, and due to popular demand extended this tour into 2013.

They brought their live show for the first time to audiences in the United States with Barry and Stuart Live at Coronet Theatre Los Angeles in April 2013.

== Filmography ==
Year	Title	Notes
2003	Magick	4 x 30-minute episodes
2005	Dirty Tricks	6 x 60-minute episodes
2005	The Magic of Jesus	TV special
2005	When Magic Tricks Go Wrong	TV special
2006	Tricks from the Bible	TV special
2007	Music Hall Meltdown	for BBC4
2007	Twisted Tricks	TV pilot
2009	Derren Brown: The 3D Magic Spectacular	TV special
2011	The Magicians (season 1)	5 x 60-minute episodes
2012	The Magicians (season 2)	6 x 75-minute episodes
2013	The Happenings	4 x 60-minute episodes
