= Nene Royal =

Thai musician (born 2010)

Nene Royal เนเน่ รอยัล
- Nene Royal in 2026

Background information
- Born: Rattikarn Amloy; 14 March 2010 (age 16); Phuket, Thailand
- Genre: Rock
- Occupations: Musician; singer
- Instruments: Vocals; guitar; keyboard
- Years active: 2022–present
- Award: Winner of America's Got Talent (2026)
- Website: neneroyal.com

Rattikarn Amloy (Note: Thai: รัตติกานต์ อำลอย, RTGS: Rattikan Amloi, pronounced [rát.tì.kāːn ām.lɔ̄ːj]) (born 14 March 2010), also known by her stage name Nene Royal (Note: Thai: เนเน่ รอยัล, RTGS: Nene Royan, pronounced [nēː.nêː rɔ̄ː.jân, -rɔ̄ː.jâw]) and the nickname Praew, (Note: Thai: แพรว, RTGS: Phraeo, pronounced [pʰrɛ̄ːw]) is a Thai rock musician and singer. She is best known for winning the 21st season of America's Got Talent in 2026.

== Biography ==
Rattikarn "Praew" Amloy was born on 14 March 2010 in Phuket, Thailand, to Narong Amloy and Chuanpit "Oom" Poonkerd. She has a brother 12 years her junior. She began playing guitar at the age of six or seven and is largely self-taught through YouTube videos. Her parents had hoped that she would pursue a career in business, and she initially wanted to study computing as an extracurricular subject. The computer class was full, so she enrolled in music.

She adopted her stage name "Nene Royal" when she began performing in public at the age of 12. In 2022, she participated in the Thai talent show Super 10, performing with Thai rock artist PooH Anchalee. In 2023, she competed in the Overdrive Guitar Contest, winning second prize and being named "Best Musician" and "Best Vocalist". The same year, she received the Trang Music Award. In 2025, she competed in the King Power Band Competition and received an "Outstanding Player" award.

In 2026, she was a Grade 11 student at Kajonkiet International School in Phuket, where she received a music scholarship. She had completed two IGCSEs and was studying towards a BTEC Extended Diploma (equivalent to three A-levels) in music, as well as an A-level in visual arts. She is a featured artist with Enya Music and is recording her debut EP. She is a member of two bands, OZONE Band and Miniheart, both of which perform at the Naka Weekend night market in Phuket.

In August 2026, Nene received the "Best New International Artiste 2026" award at the Phil Lynott Convention in Dublin, Ireland, one of only two awards presented at the convention, the other being the "Lifetime Achievement Award".

== America's Got Talent ==
=== Audition ===
In 2026, Nene was invited to perform on the America's Got Talent season 21. Among the last contestants to audition for the season, she performed "Zombie" by the Irish rock band The Cranberries. She used an Ibanez Musician Series MC300 1978 model guitar which was given to her in 2024 by Strit Bram, a Danish fan. Her performance was aired on 7 July 2026 and became the most-viewed of the season auditions posted to social media.

==== Reactions ====
Nene received four "Yes" votes from Simon Cowell, Howie Mandel, Sofia Vergara, and Mel B. Vergara called the performance "spectacular". Mel B said: "You're like a match made in heaven. You're brilliant." Mandel said, "You are such a surprise [with your] energy and the rock 'n' roll. You are a rock star, young lady, you really are." The audition went viral on YouTube, Instagram and Tiktok. It had 1.5 million views within 24 hours on YouTube, and 100 million views on other social media by the second day. NBC said her performance was the most-viewed video of all the season's auditions.

Thai television and cable network company TrueVisions, which broadcasts America's Got Talent, promoted the show and invited Thai people to support her. TrueVisions chief Ong-Ard Prapakamol said, "When a Thai artist brings her talent, creativity and determination to shine before a global audience, it inspires people across Thailand to send their support beyond borders." On 14 July, she was invited by Prime Minister Anutin Charnvirakul to attend a Cabinet meeting at Government House in Bangkok. Anutin joined her in performing the song "Som San" by Loso. At the event, Tourism and Sports Minister Surasak Phancharoenworakul announced that the government will support Nene including financing expenses for AGT performances. The government will also discuss her appointment as an ambassador for tourism promotion. The Ministry of Social Development and Human Security announced plans to giver her the Inspirational Youth honorary plaque on National Youth Day on September 20.

On 15 July, Phuket governor Chotnarin Kerdsom presented Nene an appreciation certificate in a ceremony at the Phuket Provincial Hall. On 12 August, on the ceremony for National Mother's Day 2026 in Pak Kret district, Nonthaburi, Princess Maha Chakri Sirindhorn honoured her with a certificate citing her as an "outstandingly filial child.

=== Judges' Callbacks ===
For the 2026 season, AGT introduced a new round called Judges' Callbacks in which each judge calls an act back for a performance. Nene was called up by Mandel and performed "Hysteria" by the British rock band Muse for Mandel and guest judge Nikki Glaser. The broadcast was scheduled for 11 August 2026, but aired as an "early release" on AGT YouTube channel on 8 August. Her performance was an instant hit again, with over 2.1 million views within 24 hours of release on YouTube. Mandel and Glaser chose her as one of the acts going through to the AGT Live Shows.

=== Quarterfinals ===
On August 25, Nene performed "Black Hole Sun" by Soundgarden in the live quarterfinals competition. Her attire reflected Thai culture: a sleeveless jacket in Tita style of Phuket's Baba-Peranakan and a silk fabric called Manjakiri brocade or Sompak Pum, worn over pants.

==== Reactions ====
Mandel was the first to comment, saying, "I know I'm not supposed to say this. NBC, give her the million right now." Vergara said, "Nene, I think you could really win this competition... You can play that guitar...insanely." Mel B said, "How could I not do this" and gave Nene the Golden Buzzer, sending her directly to the final.

Vicky Cornell, widow of Soundgarden frontman Chris Cornell, praised Nene's performance, describing it as an exceptional rendition and an honor to her late husband. On 29 August, Thai rock musician Aed Carabao announced on Facebook that he would give Nene 1 million baht (~$30,000) for her journey on AGT. On 5 September, she was awarded a continuing scholarship from Thailand's largest private company, Charoen Pokphand (CP Group). Nene's family received a luxury condominium in Bangkok as a congratulatory gift from the Chearavanont family, which owns CP Group and is one of Thailand's richest families.

=== Finals ===
The final round of AGT was held on 22 September 2026. Nene performed a cover of "Seven Nation Army" by the White Stripes, accompanied by AGT house drummer Ashelee Nicole Nino. An all-female-sibling rock band The Warning paid her a visit during rehearsal; Nene joined them to perform the band's new song "Kerosene".

==== Reactions ====
Mel B said, "Well, I'm glad that I pressed my golden buzzer. Because not only do you have such mysterious, mystical stage presence… If you don't win this, I'm gonna sell Howie's new house." Mandel urged the Americans to vote for Nene: "The biggest, most talented, most viral talent to be on that stage... You should win. Give her the million, America. Give her the million."

==== Finale ====
On 23 September, Nene and Linkin Park performed the band's 2024 single "The Emptiness Machine." Frontman Mike Shinoda called Nene "incredible, incredible." Nene was declared the winner, and became the first winner to be born after the series debut in 2006. Her prize of US$1 million will be paid as an annuity: $25,000 per year for 40 years, or as a single payment of the annuity's present value of about $300,000. She opted for the single payment, estimated as $300,000 to $430,000.

After her AGT win, Nene was booked to open for U.S. heavy metal band Avenged Sevenfold (A7X) at their 13 October 2026 show in Singapore. At the show, she performed a half-hour opener for 10,000 attendees, and later in the evening appeared alongside A7X, sharing guitar and vocal roles on two A7X songs.

== Voice acting ==
Nene is slated to provide the voice of Billie Doe in the Thai-language release of the animated Disney film Hexed.

== Discography ==
=== Singles ===
- Real Verse (January 4, 2026)
