= Christen Gerhart =

American stage magician (born 1990)

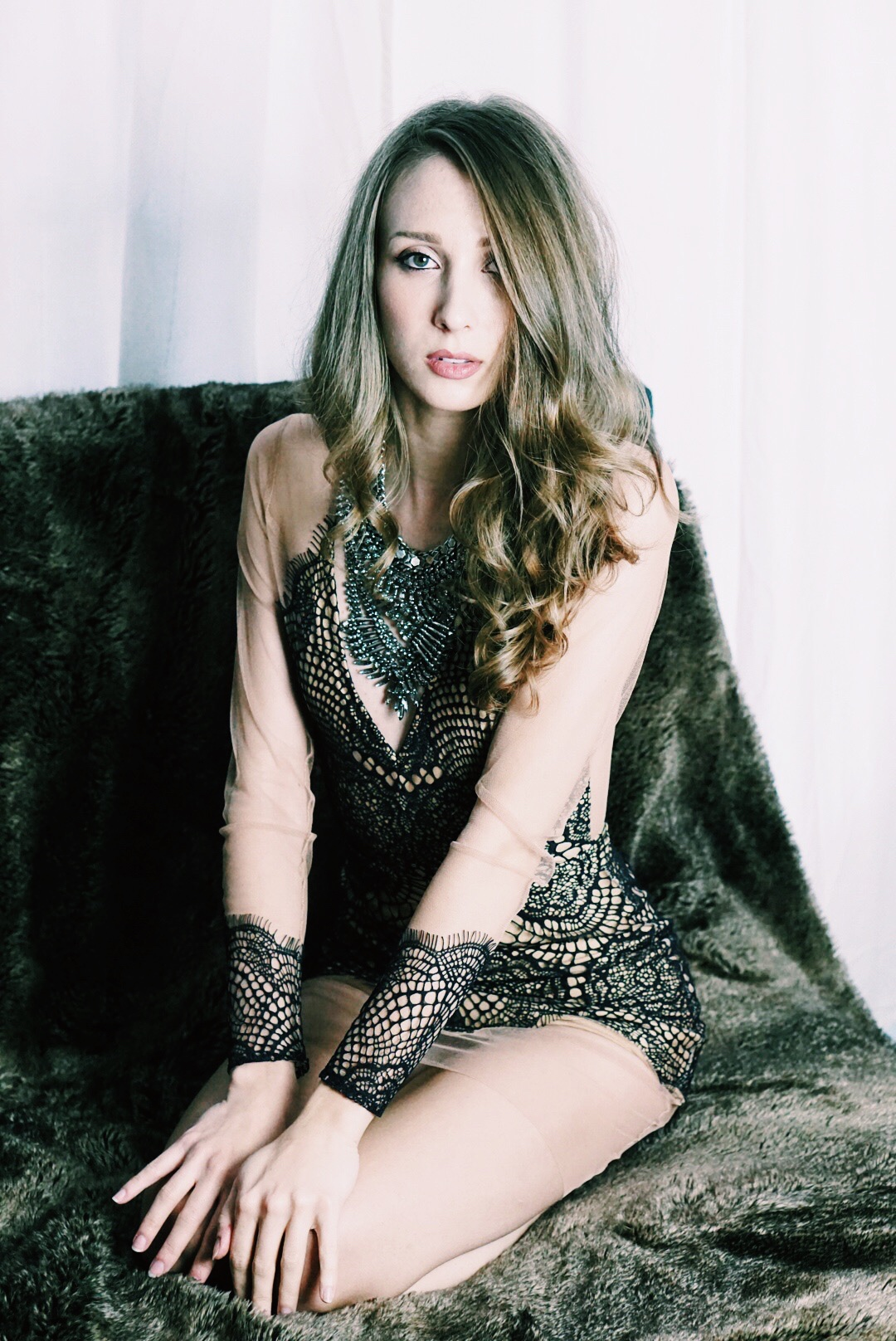
- Born: May 26, 1990 (age 36); Los Angeles, California, United States
- Occupations: Magician, magic critic, web host, telescope operator
- Known for: Wizard Wars, Exposé, Bitchkraft

Christen Gerhart is an American television host, actress, and magician. She had served as one of the judges, with Penn & Teller and Jason Latimer, on the magic contest reality television series Wizard Wars on the Syfy channel.

Gerhart is a magician and magic news reporter on a weekly magic-themed web show called Exposé, at theory11.com. She has focused her career on analyzing and understanding the magic world, and is a long-standing member of the Magic Castle.

She is also a telescope operator at Mt. Wilson Observatory and a former NASA Jet Propulsion Lab researcher.

Gerhart and comedian Eden Dranger are the performers on Bitchkraft, an original web series on YouTube featuring female-centric magic.

In April 2015, Gerhart, who is a vegan, launched "A Harmless Project" to promote cruelty-free, chic fashion.
