= Jason Latimer =

American magician (born 1981)

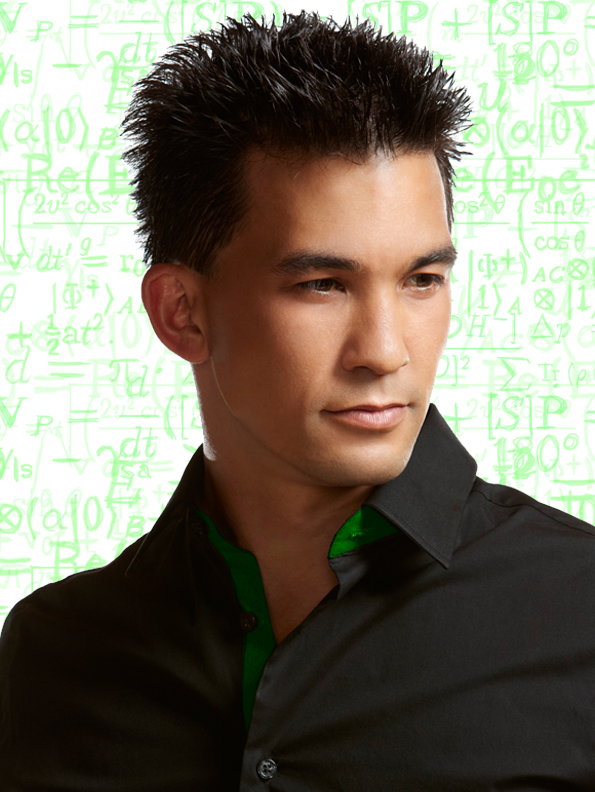
- Born: Jason Latimer; March 7, 1981 (age 45); Roseburg, Oregon, United States
- Occupation: illusionist
- Website: www.jasonlatimer.com

Jason Latimer (born March 7, 1981), known by the stage name LATIMER, is an American illusionist. In 2003, he became one of four Americans ever to win the title Grand Prix "Best Overall" at the World Championships of Magic. In 2012, Latimer starred in the six live British television specials on the BBC One's "The Magicians," and won UK competition overall. In 2014, Latimer joined Penn & Teller and Christen Gerhart as a judge on the American magic competition television series Wizard Wars on the Syfy channel. In 2015, Latimer launched the Impossible Science program in San Diego, CA. Currently, Latimer is the curator of Impossible Science for the Fleet Science Center and oversees the Impossible Science Initiative in science centers throughout Southern California. Jason co-hosts Science Channel's series SciJinks with The Big Bang Theory's Johnny Galecki and Mythbusters: The Search's Tamara Robertson. In 2018, Jason joined the likes David Copperfield and David Blaine as one of the few recipients of the prestigious Golden Grolla Award from the Masters of Magic in Saint-Vincent, Italy. In 2018, he was the closing speaker of the USA Science and Engineering Festival in Washington, D.C., for recognition of Impossible Science and changing education with wonder.

== Impossible Science ==
March 5, 2015, Jason Latimer accepted the position of the Curator of Impossible Science for the Fleet Science Center in San Diego, CA. Jason's role would be to coordinate the Impossible Science Experience and Program by designing interactive science experiments to engage curiosity and wonder in an educational environment.

Aug 2015, Jason launched the Impossible Science Festival & Labs among science centers throughout Southern California. The Impossible Science academic platform uses illusion and science fiction to engage curiosity while integrating over 50 science experiments. Currently, the Impossible Science Initiative includes Discovery Cube Los Angeles, Columbia Memorial Space Center in the City of Downey, Discovery Cube Orange County and the Fleet Science Center in San Diego, CA.

Oct 2016, Comic Con HQ made a 10 part series on Jason’s Impossible Science research at the Fleet Science Center in San Diego, CA. Each episode dove into Jason’s illusion design, work, research, and interviews with the leaders in the fields of Invisibility, Levitation, Biomimicry, Mind Control, Bionics, Transformation, Artificial Intelligence, Re-Animation, 3D Bioprinting, and High Speed Travel.

July 2015, Latimer launched Impossible Science Experience; a stage show concerning illusion design in fields of Physics, Chemistry, Mathematics, Engineering, and Psychology.

== Wizard Wars ==
Jason Latimer is one of the judges with Penn & Teller and Christen Gerhart on the contest reality television series Wizard Wars on the Syfy channel.

== The Magicians ==
In 2012, Latimer competed against the Scottish magic duo Barry and Stuart and British comedy magician Pete Firman in all categories of magic on the second season of the British television series The Magicians. The winner was determined by the British public vote. Over the course of six specials, Latimer was named the season's winner and series champion of season 2 of The Magicians.

== The World Championships of Magic ==
Jason Latimer is the third American in history to be awarded magic's highest honor of being titled "The Grand Prix World Champion of Magic" in 2003 by the International Federation of Magic Societies (FISM) The two previous American winners of the "Grand Prix" are Lance Burton of the Monte Carlo Hotel and Casino in Las Vegas, Nevada in 1982 and close up magician Johnny Ace Palmer in 1988. Latimer was awarded multiple "World Championship" titles and FISM awards in categories of close-up magic and in the invention & design.

== Recognition in the field of science and education ==
Nov 2016, Jason is recognized for his work in Impossible Science at the Conference for the Advancement of Science Teaching (CAST) 2016.

Aug 2016, Latimer is honored as the keynote speaker by the E3 Summit for his work and innovation in education at the Fleet Science Center in San Diego, CA.

June 2016, Latimer is featured as the keynote speaker for the Department of Education for Wyoming on the new approach the Impossible Science Initiative has brought to STEM education.

March 5, 2015, Jason was named curator of the Fleet Science Center in San Diego, CA. Jason’s role is to research cutting edge technologies approaching impossible topics and to develop and design interactive science activities at the science center to make today's impossibilities into tomorrow's realities.

Jan 2015, Jason is honored by Innovative Teaching for his address to the New York Science And Technology Educators (NYSCATE) for the future of education and the necessary role of curiosity and wonder must play in education.

In July 2014 - Jan 2016, Jason Latimer opened "Perception: See Beyond the Illusion," the first live show with the dome projection OMNIMAX/ IMAX Dome experience at the Reuben H. Fleet Science Center in San Diego, CA. "Perception" was a show designed to unite all sciences (i.e. mathematics, physics, chemistry, psychology, etc.) with illusion to inspire thinking, wonder, and curiosity in a science center.

In Oct 2013, Latimer was a speaker of the TEDxWallStreet conference at the NYSE. His talk was entitled, "Seeing Beyond the Illusion of Knowledge" referencing the necessity of wonder in the age of information.

In 2009, Latimer's contributions in illusion, science, and technology earned him an invite to be a presenter and performer at The Origins Symposium at Arizona State University.

Latimer was the special guest performer and presenter for Kshitij 2008 of the Indian Institutes of Technology (IIT) for his work utilizing light and laser technology.

Latimer has degrees and fields of study in Mathematics, Economics, and Applied Physics with research in multiple fields of Psychology of perception and attention from University of California Santa Barbara.

== Television specials and appearances ==
- NBC- Access Hollywood- Himself
- Comic-Con HQ - Impossible Science - Host
- Syfy: Wizard Wars Season 1, Episodes 1–6 – Judge - Himself
- TEDxWallStreet – 2013 Keynote Speaker- Himself
- CBS – The Talk Season 3, Episode 49 – Celebrity Guest and Entertainment- Himself
- BBC One – The Magicians Season 2, Ep. 1–6, 2012 – Starring Role
- NBC – The Ellen DeGeneres Show Performance, aired October 31, 2008 – Guest and Entertainment
- CBS – The Late Late Show With Craig Ferguson Performance, aired December 15, 2005 – Guest and Entertainment
- Le Plus Grand Cabaret Du Monde – With Patrick Sébastien – Entertainment
- BBC – History of Magic, Close up Magic 2008 – Interview and Documentary
- THUY NGA “Paris by Night” 2017 - “123: Ao Anh”

== Effects and tricks ==
=== Bending Light ===
Bending Light – (Theatrical name: Laser Fiction) is an illusion, created and performed by Jason Latimer, which gives the appearance that an individual can manipulate a beam of light like a solid object. Laser Fiction, although an illusion, is recognized by the science community for its appearance of interaction with light and touch. In 2009, Latimer's contributions in the illusion of light interaction, engineering and technology earned Jason an invite to be a presenter and performer at The Origins Symposium at Arizona State University amongst such notable scientists as Stephen Hawking and six Nobel Laureates (Baruch Blumberg, Walter Gilbert, Sheldon Glashow, John C. Mather, David Gross and Frank Wilczek)

As performed on the BBC One's TV special "The Magicians, Episode 1," “The Ellen DeGeneres Show, Oct 2008," and YouTube Live 2008. Latimer appears to be able to bend light, hang objects on a beam, break the beam and pick up the beam.

=== Shaping Water ===
Shaping Water – (Theatrical name: Water Misfit) is an illusion, created and performed by Jason Latimer, which gives the appearance that an individual can control water into a shape and then pop it and have it return to water form.

As performed on the BBC One's TV special "The Magicians, Episode 6," Latimer gives the illusion that he is able to shape water into a sphere, flowers, and other shapes and then pop them. The illusion first appeared on UK television February 11, 2012 with Britain's Got Talent Winner George Sampson.

=== Clear Cups and Balls ===
Latimer Clear Cups and Balls is an illusion, created and performed by Jason Latimer, which is a version of the "follow the ball" cups and balls game where the magician uses clear glass cups.

Debuted by Jason Latimer in 2003 at International Federation of Magic Societies (FISM), and on television in "The Late Late Show with Craig Ferguson, 2004" This effect won Jason Latimer "World Champion" FISM titles in Close up magic and Invention and Design, as well as the "Grand Prix World Champion of Magic."

=== Fountain Walk ===
Walking on Fountain Jets – (Theatrical name: Fountain Walk) is an illusion, created and performed by Jason Latimer, which gives the appearance that an individual walks on jets of water like steps.

As performed on the BBC One's TV special The Magicians, Episode 3, Latimer gives the illusion that he is able to walk on water and water fountain jets. The effect was debuted at Marble Arch in London, United Kingdom. It first appeared on television January 21, 2012 with former Pussycat Doll and Got to Dance judge Kimberly Wyatt.

=== Truck to Truck Teleportation ===
Truck Teleportation – (Theatrically named: Truck to Truck Teleportation) is an illusion, created and performed by Jason Latimer, which teleports audience members from one moving truck to another moving truck.

As performed on the BBC One's TV special "The Magicians, Episode 6," Latimer gives the illusion of teleporting audience members from one moving truck to another moving truck, while the viewing audience is on a third transport truck. The effect was debuted at Dunsfold Aerodrome in Surrey, United Kingdom. It first appeared on television in February 2012 on the BBC One with Britain's Got Talent Winner George Sampson.

=== Live Bullet Time Levitation ===
Perfect Picture Levitation (Matrix Levitation – Live Bullet Time) is performed and created by Jason Latimer, in which an assistant is levitated up into the air and then the entire scene is rotated 360 degrees to give the effect of Bullet Time

As performed on the BBC One's TV special "The Magicians, Episode 3," Latimer levitated former Pussycat Doll and Got to Dance judge Kimberly Wyatt then the entire scene rotates, stage, girl in the air, rotate 360 degrees to give the visual effect of Bullet Time on stage. The effect was debuted on television on the BBC One, January 2012
