= The Magicians (British TV series) =

- Genre: Talent show
- Presented by: Lenny Henry (2011); Darren McMullen (2012)
- Starring: Barry and Stuart; Luis de Matos (2011); Chris Korn (2011); Jason Latimer (2012); Pete Firman (2012)
- Country of origin: United Kingdom
- Original language: English
- No. of series: 2
- No. of episodes: 11 (list of episodes)

Production
- Executive producer: Karen Smith
- Producers: Will Spokes (2011); Sam Donnelly (2011); Richard Greenwood (2012)
- Running time: 60 minutes (2011); 75 minutes (2012)
- Production company: Shine TV

Original release
- Network: BBC One
- Release: 1 January 2011 – 11 February 2012

The Magicians is a British talent show, first broadcast throughout January 2011 on BBC One.

The show features magicians performing a number of magic tricks with guest celebrities, to decide which pair will face a forfeit trick at the end of the episode. In the first series, this was decided through audience participation; however, for the second series, a phone vote was introduced. The first series was hosted by Lenny Henry, and featured magicians Luis de Matos, Barry and Stuart and Chris Korn. At the end of series 1, Luis de Matos was deemed series champion.

The second series, which began airing in January 2012, is hosted by Darren McMullen, and replaces magicians de Matos and Korn with Jason Latimer and Pete Firman. While the first series was completely pre-recorded, the second series was broadcast live on Saturday nights, with the exception of the pre-recorded "Street Magic" and "Location Grand Illusion" segments. Thus, The Magicians became the first live magic programme to be broadcast on the BBC in over 30 years. At the end of series 2 Jason Latimer was deemed series champion by the UK viewers.

It was announced on 28 June 2012 that The Magicians had been axed.

== Format ==
Each episode features three magicians, each of whom are paired with a different celebrity. They must then perform a series of tricks to decide which pair will face a forfeit trick at the end of the episode.

In series one, the tricks were as follows:

- Grand Illusion – The pair perform a grand illusion in front of the audience, inspired by the episode's set theme.
- Street Magic – The pair go out on to the streets to perform in front of the general public.
- Celebrity's Choice – The pair perform a trick that the celebrity has always wanted to perform.

In series two, the tricks were as follows:

- Grand Illusion – Same as series one, however, this time it is performed live.
- Street Magic – Same as series one.
- Close Up Magic – The pair perform a simple trick live in amongst the audience, usually involving cards.
- Location Grand Illusion – The pair perform a grand illusion in a similar fashion to their street magic.

The order in which each of the magicians perform, and the order in which each of the tricks is done, changes from show to show. In series one, each episode had a specific theme, however, in series two, there were no themes. The second series also featured guest performances from another magician whilst the phone votes were being counted.

In the first series, after all nine performances, members of the studio audience voted for their favourite magician-celebrity partnership using an audience response system. In the second series, viewers could vote for their favourite acts via telephone. The act with the most votes were declared the winners, and the act with the fewest votes had to then attempt the forfeit trick. In the first series, the forfeit trick was explained to the magician, but not the celebrity. In the second series, the forfeit was explained to all three celebrities and magicians before the show went on air.

== International adaptations ==
Country	Title	Presenter	Magicians	Network	Premiere date
Ukraine	Магiя	Yuriy Horbunov; Tatyana Lazareva	Lyudmila Ratiani; Maria Koch-Kukes; Diana Gaičiūnaitė; Arvydas Gaičiūnas; Valentina Maximova; Vladimir Maximov	1+1	9 July 2012
Spain	Por arte de magia	Anna Simon	Jorge Blass; Yunque; Luis de Matos; Juan Tamariz (assistant)	Antena 3	13 September 2013
Russia	Магия	Volodymyr Zelenskyy; Tatyana Lazareva	Lyudmila Ratiani; Maria Koch-Kukes; Diana Gaičiūnaitė; Arvydas Gaičiūnas; Valentina Maximova; Vladimir Maximov	NTV (filmed for Russia-1 in 2011)	3 May 2019
