= America's Got Talent season 21 =

America's Got Talent
- Season 21
- Promotional poster for season 21, featuring (L to R) judges Mel B, Mandel, Cowell, and Vergara alongside host Crews
- Hosted by: Terry Crews
- Judges: Howie Mandel; Mel B; Sofía Vergara; Simon Cowell
- Winner: Nene Royal
- Runner-up: Geno Ploeger
- No. of episodes: 23

Release
- Original network: NBC
- Original release: June 2 – September 23, 2026

Season chronology
- ← Previous; Season 20

The twenty-first season of the American talent show competition series America's Got Talent premiered on NBC on June 2, 2026, and concluded on September 23, 2026. Howie Mandel, Mel B, Sofía Vergara, and Simon Cowell all returned to the panel for their seventeenth, eighth, seventh, and eleventh respective seasons. Terry Crews returned as host for his eighth consecutive season. With Crews' return, he now ties with Nick Cannon's record as the longest-serving host in the show's history.

The season was won by singer and guitarist Nene Royal, with magician Geno Ploeger finishing second, and magician group Hundred Fingers placing third.

== Production ==
On March 12, 2026, it was confirmed that the entire cast from the previous season would return for the twenty-first season. The following day, filming of the auditions began at the Pasadena Civic Auditorium.

On August 24, 2026, it was reported that judge Simon Cowell would be absent from the live show judging panel for a few weeks, in order to undergo back surgery. Entertainment Tonight reported that guest judges will fill in for Cowell during his absence. While no guest judge was present for the second Quarter-final round, Kenan Thompson served as a guest judge for the third Quarter-final round on September 1; Thompson previously filled-in for Cowell as a guest judge during season fifteen in 2020. On September 2, it was reported that former AGT judge Heidi Klum would serve as a guest judge for the final Quarter-final round on September 8. On September 22, it was announced that Britain's Got Talent judge KSI would serve as a guest judge for the season's finals on September 22 and 23.

Due to NBC Sunday Night Football airing on September 9, the season's final Quarter-final round was aired altogether on September 8. Through this scheduling, the entire week's regular schedule was instead done in three hours on a single night, with the acts' performances during the first two hours, followed by immediate results in the third hour.

Judges and Host for America's Got Talent Season 21

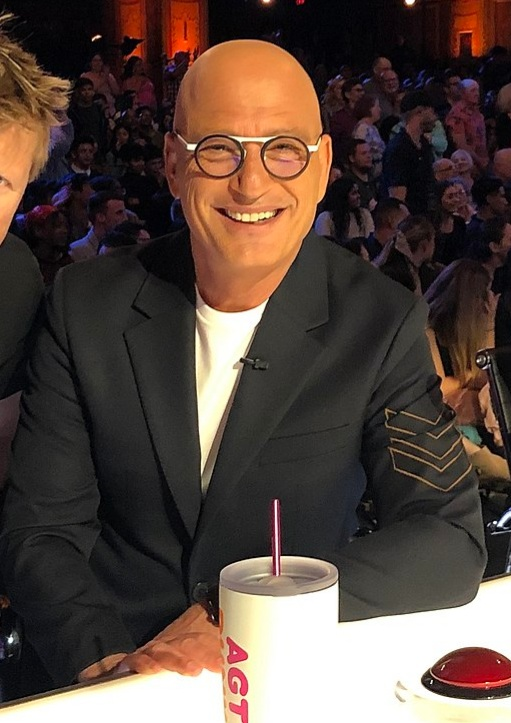
Howie Mandel

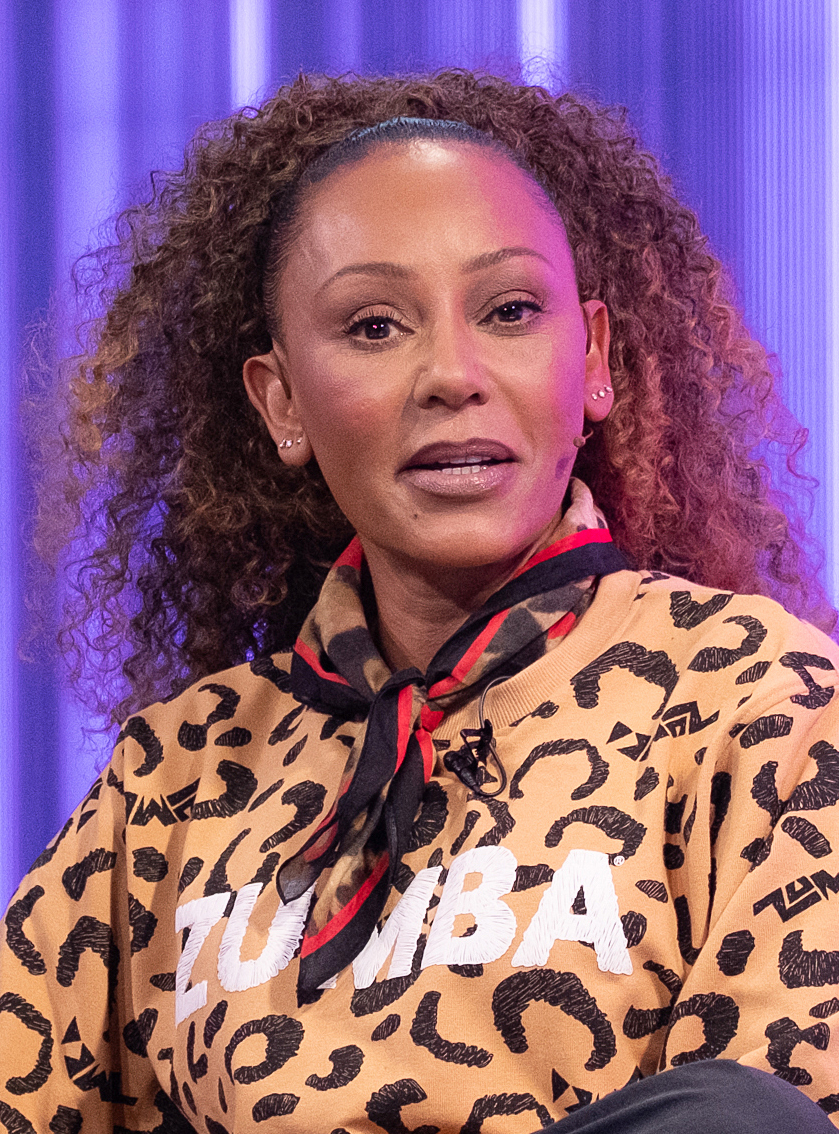
Mel B

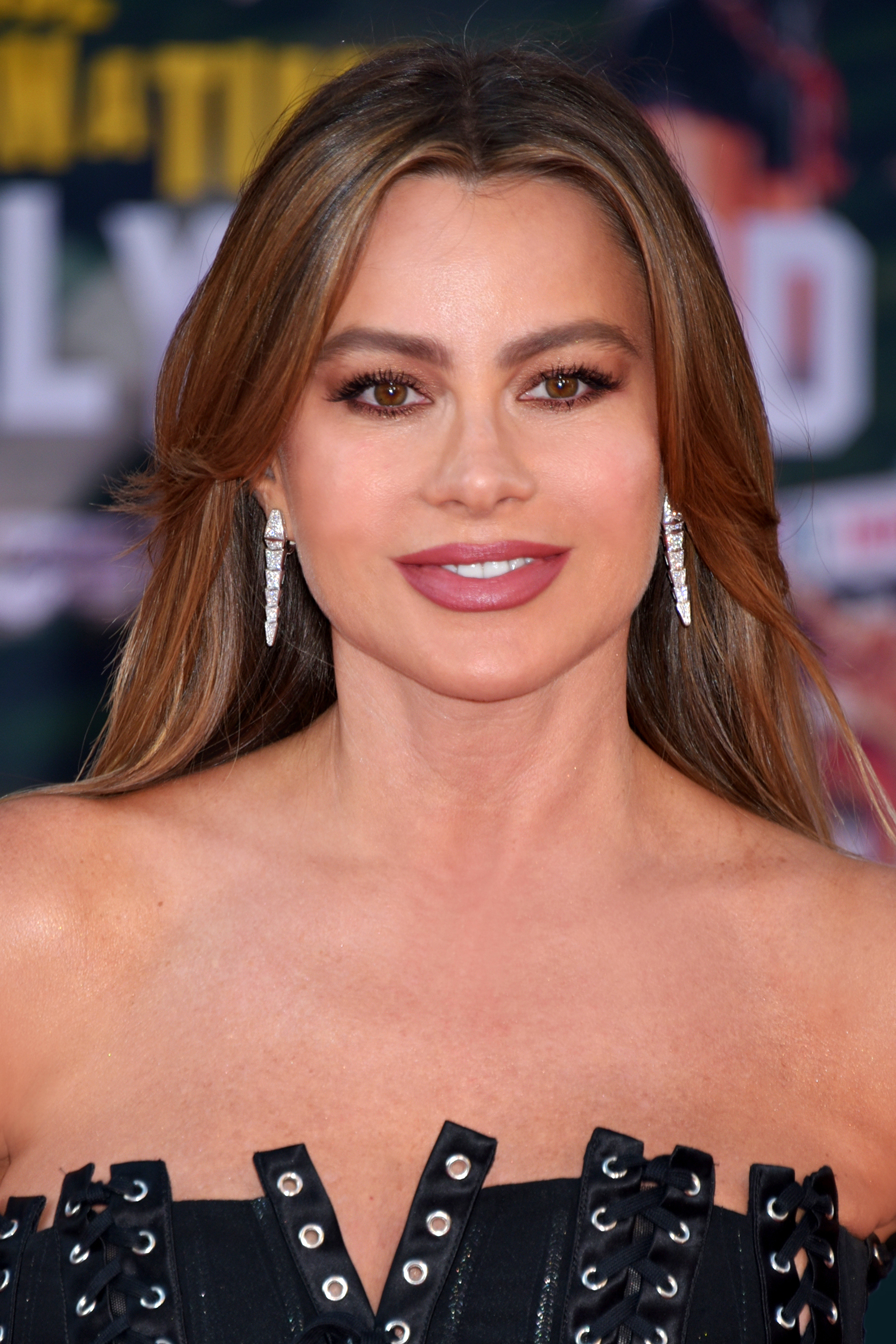
Sofía Vergara

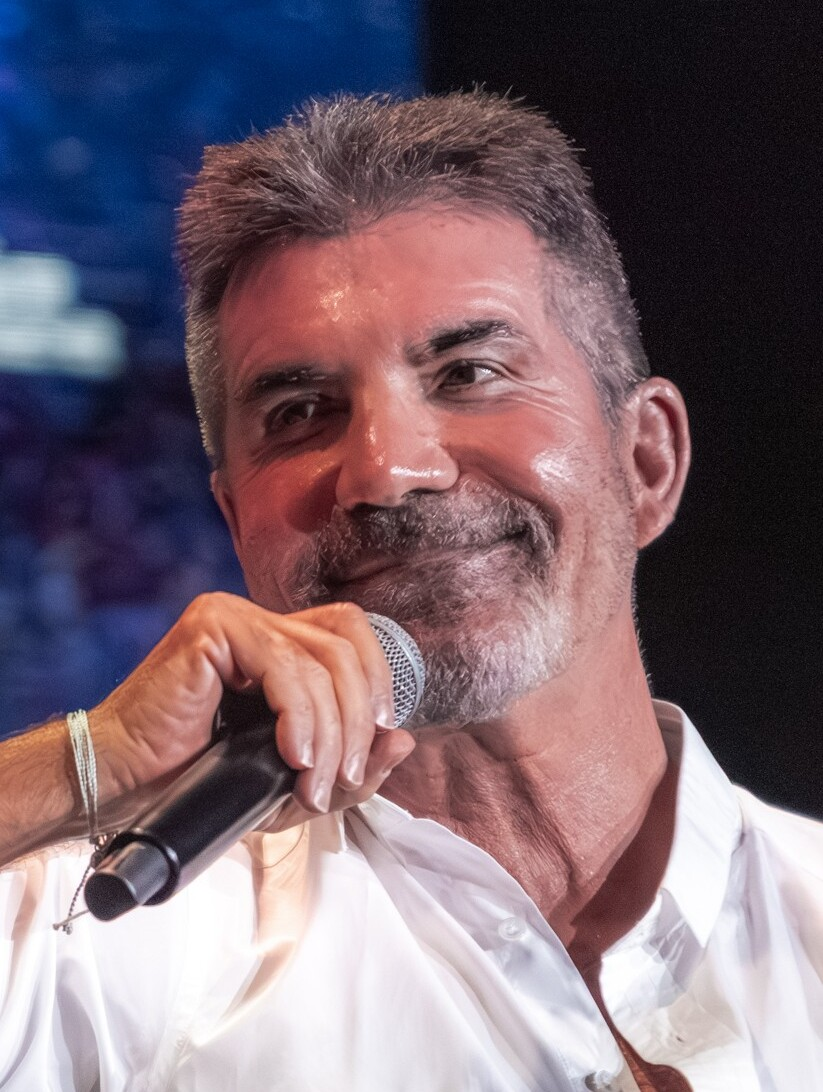
Simon Cowell

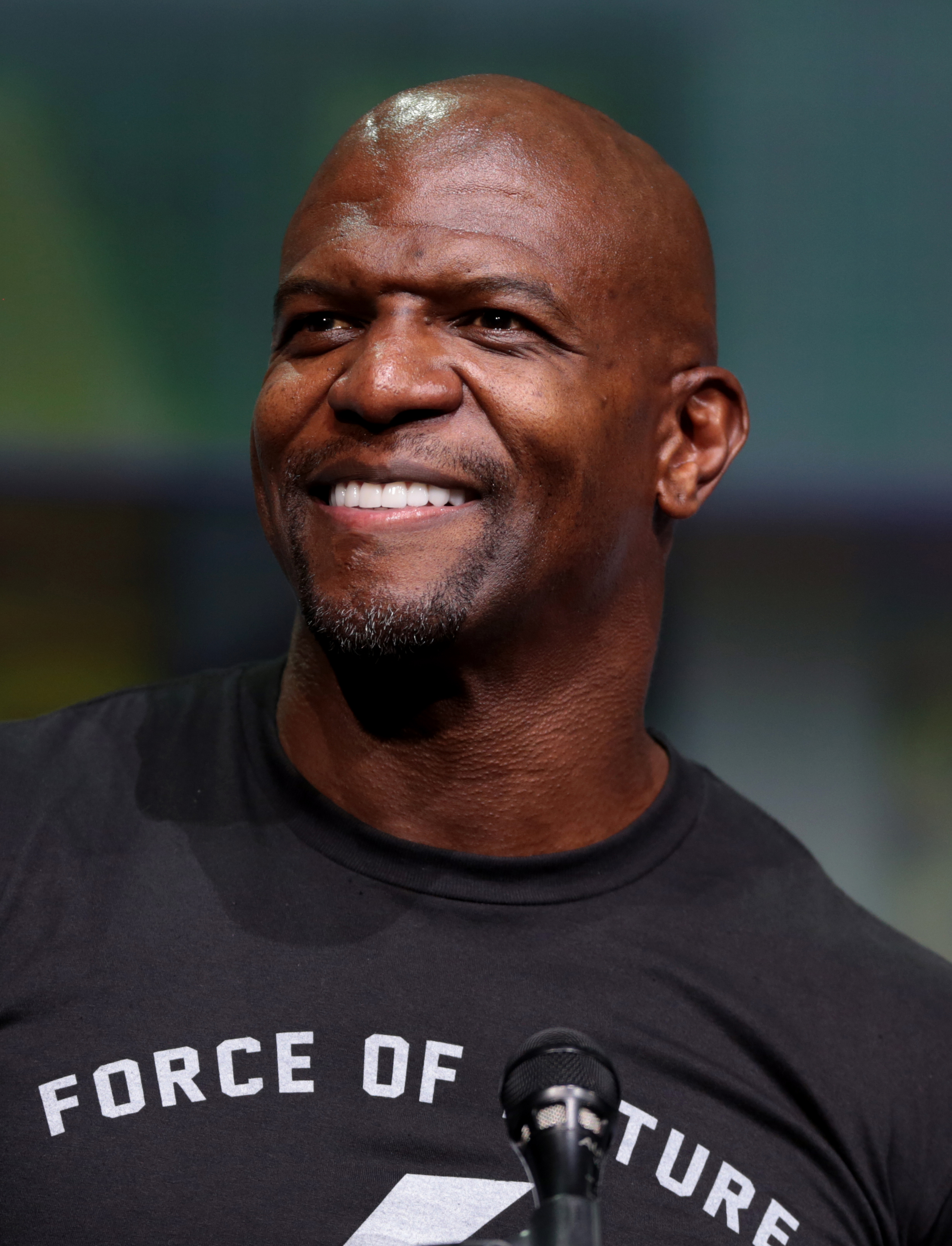
Terry Crews

== Season overview ==
=== Auditions ===
For the third consecutive season, and the only three times in the show's history, each judge was able to give two Golden Buzzers instead of the usual one; host Terry Crews also received two Golden Buzzers to give out during the auditions.

=== Judges' Callbacks ===
This season, a new round dubbed the Judges' Callbacks occurred. The purpose of the round is to give 23 select acts a second chance to earn a spot in the live shows after the judges' deliberations.

During this round, each judge worked closely with their guest judges to offer feedback and guidance to acts they selected before deciding who would advance to the live shows. Cowell hosted his selected acts in Malibu, where he was joined by singer Normani and songwriter and producer Poo Bear. Vergara hosted her selected acts in Beverly Hills, joined by singer Sebastián Yatra and content creator Lele Pons. Mel B hosted her selected acts in Leeds, alongside her Spice Girls groupmate Emma Bunton. Mandel hosted his select acts at the Laugh Factory in Hollywood, where he was joined by comedian Nikki Glaser.

Summary of Judges' Callbacks
Judge	Location	Guest judges	Acts
Cowell	Malibu	Normani and Poo Bear	Akira; Elektrodads; Elsie; Nyjah Music & Zyah Rhythm; Sando; Travis Garland
Vergara	Beverly Hills	Lele Pons and Sebastián Yatra	Brook Lynn; Darrell Moten; Kameron Marshall; Olivia Befus; Vahtang
Mel B	Leeds	Emma Bunton	Bety; Butter & Grit; James & Marina; Joel M Lachlan Patterson; Madelyn Tallent & Malachi Martin
Mandel	Laugh Factory Hollywood	Nikki Glaser	Bird and Byron; Cris Sosa; Daniel Alvarez; Naimana & Daniele; Nene Royal; Rynia Kando

=== Live shows ===
Winner | Runner-up | Third place | Finalist | Semi-finalist | Quarter-finalist | Golden Buzzer | Live Golden Buzzer

Participant	Age(s)	Genre	Act	From	Quarter-Final	Result
Acro Canine Crew	7-21	Animal / Dance	Dancing Dog Group	Edmonton, Alberta, Canada	3	Finalist
Akira	TBA	Variety	Novelty Act	Japan	4	Eliminated
Ashford Sanders	TBA	Singing	Singer	Atlanta, Georgia	1	Eliminated
Bety	TBA	Singing	Singer	Valencia, Spain	2	Eliminated
Bird and Byron	TBA	Singing	Rock Duo	Columbus, Ohio	4	Eliminated
Brad & Tracy	TBA	Danger	Sideshow Duo	Pullman, Washington	2	Eliminated
Brook Lynn	TBA	Singing	Singer	Wilp, The Netherlands	1	Eliminated
Butter & Grit	TBA	Singing	Vocal Duo	Nashville, Tennessee	2	Eliminated
Cameron Logsdon	TBA	Comedy	Impressionist	Omaha, Nebraska	4	Eliminated
Cesar Dias	TBA	Singing / Comedy	Comedy Singer	Portugal	4	Semi-finalist
Come Here	TBA	Dance	Dance Group	South Korea	2	Finalist
Cris Sosa	TBA	Comedy	Comedian	Humble, Texas	1	Eliminated
Daniel Alvarez	TBA	Comedy	Comedian	Los Angeles, California	3	Semi-finalist
Elsie	TBA	Singing	Singer	Columbia, Mississippi	3	Eliminated
Geno Ploeger	TBA	Magic	Magician	Phoenix, Arizona	2	Runner-up
Guy Kelton Jones I	TBA	Singing / Variety	Singer & Poet	New York City	3	Eliminated
Herwan Legaillard	TBA	Acrobatics / Danger	Aerialist & Sword Swallower	France	3	Eliminated
Holland & Sienna	TBA	Acrobatics	Aerial Duo	Las Vegas, Nevada	3	Eliminated
Hundred Fingers	TBA	Magic	Magician Group	South Korea	1	Third place
Isaac Atkins	23	Singing	Singer	Oahu, Hawaii	3	Eliminated
James & Marina	TBA	Magic	Mentalist Duo	England and Ukraine	1	Eliminated
Jesse Joe	TBA	Singing	Singer	Midland, Texas	4	Eliminated
Jesse White Tumbling Team	TBA	Acrobatics	Tumbling Group	Chicago, Illinois	1	Eliminated
Kameron Marshall	TBA	Magic	Magician	Toronto, Ontario, Canada	3	Semi-finalist
Lai Noelle	14	Singing	Singer	Dallas, Texas	3	Finalist
Lara D	23	Singing	Singer	Sydney, Australia	4	Eliminated
LaRussell	TBA	Singing	Rapper	Vallejo, California	2	Eliminated
Luke Taleno	TBA	Singing	Rapper	Hialeah, Florida	1	Semi-finalist
Mackenzie Sol	25	Singing	Singer	Newcastle, United Kingdom	2	Eliminated
Maria	18	Acrobatics	Contortionist	Bavaria, Germany	3	Eliminated
Nene Royal	16	Singing	Singer & Guitarist	Phuket, Thailand	2	Winner
Nyjah Music & Zyah Rhythm	TBA	Singing	Vocal Duo	O'ahu, Hawaii	2	Eliminated
Olivia Befus	17	Animal	Dog Act	Midland, Michigan	1	Finalist
Patrox	TBA	Dance	Dancer	Germany	2	Eliminated
Pynk Beard	TBA	Singing	Singer	Birmingham, Alabama	3	Eliminated
Royal Lasers	TBA	Dance	Light–Up Dance Trio	Las Vegas, Nevada	1	Grand-finalist
Rubén Roldán	TBA	Acrobatics	Parkour Athlete	Málaga, Spain	4	Eliminated
Sando	TBA	Dance	Dancer	Los Angeles, California	1	Eliminated
The CommUNITY ATL	TBA	Singing	Choir	Atlanta, Georgia	1	Eliminated
Travis Garland	TBA	Singing	Singer	Lubbock, Texas	4	Semi-finalist
Tyrone & Margo	TBA	Danger	Knife Throwing Duo	—	4	Eliminated
Unitree	TBA	Dance / Variety	Robot Dance Group	Hangzhou, China	4	Finalist
Veronika Goroshkova	TBA	Acrobatics	Aerialist	Las Vegas, Nevada (Note: Veronika originally lived in Mariupol, Ukraine)	2	Grand-finalist
Young & Strange	TBA	Magic	Magic Duo	Oxfordshire, England	4	Semi-finalist

==== Quarter-finals summary ====
Buzzed Out | Live Golden Buzzer | Advanced to Finals | Advanced to Semifinals | Eliminated (Top 5)

===== Quarter-final 1 (August 18) =====
Guest Performer, Results Show: NCT 127

Participant	Order	Buzzes				Result (August 19)
Participant	Order	Cowell	Vergara	Mel B	Mandel	Result (August 19)
The CommUNITY ATL	1					Eliminated
James & Marina	2	Buzzed Out				Eliminated
Jesse White Tumbling Team	3					Eliminated (Top 5)
Ashford Sanders	4					Eliminated
Sando	5					Eliminated
Hundred Fingers	6				Live Golden Buzzer	Advanced
Brook Lynn	7					Eliminated
Royal Lasers	8					Advanced
Olivia Befus	9					Advanced
Cris Sosa	10					Eliminated (Top 5)
Luke Taleno	11					Advanced

===== Quarter-final 2 (August 25) =====
Guest Performers, Results Show: Steve Ray Ladson & The War and Treaty

Participant	Order	Buzzes			Result (August 26)
Participant	Order	Vergara	Mel B	Mandel	Result (August 26)
LaRussell	1				Eliminated
Veronika Goroshkova	2				Advanced
Bety	3				Eliminated
Come Here	4				Advanced
Nyjah Music & Zyah Rhythm	5		Buzzed Out		Eliminated
Geno Ploeger	6				Advanced
Patrox	7				Eliminated
Nene Royal	8		Live Golden Buzzer		Advanced
Mackenzie Sol	9				Eliminated (Top 5)
Brad & Tracy	10		Buzzed Out		Eliminated
Butter & Grit	11				Eliminated (Top 5)

===== Quarter-final 3 (September 1) =====
Guest Performers, Results Show: Absolutely, Amma, and Detroit Youth Choir

Participant	Order	Buzzes				Result (September 2)
Participant	Order	Thompson	Vergara	Mel B	Mandel	Result (September 2)
Holland & Sienna	1					Eliminated
Isaac Atkins	2					Eliminated (Top 5)
Maria	3					Eliminated
Elsie	4					Eliminated
Acro Canine Crew	5					Advanced
Herwan Legaillard	6					Eliminated
Guy Kelton Jones I	7					Eliminated (Top 5)
Kameron Marshall	8					Advanced
Lai Noelle	9	^{1}				Advanced
Daniel Alvarez	10					Advanced
Pynk Beard	11					Eliminated

^1 Vergara pressed the golden buzzer after Thompson's instruction to "get her get back".

===== Quarter-final 4 (September 8) =====
Guest Performers, Results Show: Oz Pearlman & Warren Zeiders

Participant	Order	Buzzes				Result (September 8)
Participant	Order	Klum	Vergara	Mel B	Mandel	Result (September 8)
Young & Strange	1					Advanced
Lara D	2					Eliminated (Top 5)
Rubén Roldán	3					Eliminated
Cameron Logsdon	4					Eliminated
Bird and Byron	5					Eliminated (Top 5)
Tyrone & Margo	6					Eliminated
Cesar Dias	7					Advanced
Unitree	8		Live Golden Buzzer			Advanced
Travis Garland	9					Advanced
Akira	10			Buzzed Out		Eliminated
Jesse Joe	11					Eliminated

=== Semi-finals summary ===
Advanced to Finals

==== Semi-final (September 15) ====
Guest Performer, Results Show: Chris Turner

Participant	Order	Buzzes			Result (September 16)
Participant	Order	Vergara	Mel B	Mandel	Result (September 16)
Acro Canine Crew	1				Advanced
Kameron Marshall	2				Eliminated
Cesar Dias	3				Eliminated
Veronika Goroshkova	4				Advanced
Luke Taleno	5				Eliminated
Royal Lasers	6				Advanced
Olivia Befus	7				Advanced
Young & Strange	8				Eliminated
Come Here	9				Advanced
Daniel Alvarez	10				Eliminated
Geno Ploeger	11				Advanced
Travis Garland	12				Eliminated

=== Finals summary ===
Guest Performers, Results Show: Taylen Biggs and Trisha Paytas

Winner | Runner-up | 3rd place | Top 5

Finalist	Performed with (2nd Performance)	Result
Acro Canine Crew	Lele Pons ^{2}	Finalist
Come Here	Rei Ami	Finalist
Geno Ploeger	Mat Franco, Eric Nam & Sydney McLaughlin-Levrone	2nd
Hundred Fingers	Chloe Flower	3rd
Lai Noelle	Jessica Sanchez	Finalist
Nene Royal	Linkin Park	1st
Olivia Befus	Lele Pons ^{2}	Finalist
Royal Lasers	Steve Aoki ^{3}	Grand-finalist
Unitree	Steve Aoki ^{3}	Finalist
Veronika Goroshkova	Josh Groban	Grand-finalist

- ^2 Acro Canine Crew and Olivia Befus conducted a joint routine for their second performance, and thus shared the same guest performer.
- ^3 Royal Lasers and Unitree conducted a joint routine for their second performance, and thus shared the same guest performer.

== Ratings ==
Viewership and ratings per episode of America's Got Talent season 21
No.	Title	Air date	Timeslot (ET)	Rating (18–49)	Viewers (millions)	Ref.
1	"Auditions 1"	June 2, 2026	Tuesday 8 p.m.	0.5	4.86	
2	"Auditions 2"	June 9, 2026	Tuesday 8 p.m.	0.4	4.82	
3	"Auditions 3"	June 16, 2026	Tuesday 8 p.m.	0.3	4.82	
4	"Auditions 4"	June 23, 2026	Tuesday 8 p.m.	0.3	4.87	
5	"AGT: July 4th Party in the USA"	June 30, 2026	Tuesday 8 p.m.	0.3	3.91	
6	"Auditions 5"	July 7, 2026	Tuesday 8 p.m.	0.4	4.98	
7	"Auditions 6"	July 14, 2026	Tuesday 8 p.m.	0.3	4.81	
8	"Auditions 7"	July 21, 2026	Tuesday 8 p.m.	0.4	5.15	
9	"Live Acts Revealed"	July 28, 2026	Tuesday 8 p.m.	0.3	4.11	
10	"Judges' Callbacks 1"	August 4, 2026	Tuesday 8 p.m.	0.3	4.17	
11	"Judges' Callbacks 2"	August 11, 2026	Tuesday 8 p.m.	0.3	3.98	
12	"Quarterfinals 1"	August 18, 2026	Tuesday 8 p.m.	0.4	4.43	
13	"Quarterfinals 1 Results"	August 19, 2026	Wednesday 8 p.m.	0.3	3.79	
14	"Quarterfinals 2"	August 25, 2026	Tuesday 8 p.m.	0.4	4.44	
15	"Quarterfinals 2 Results"	August 26, 2026	Wednesday 8 p.m.	0.3	3.75	
16	"Quarterfinals 3"	September 1, 2026	Tuesday 8 p.m.	0.4	4.77	
17	"Quarterfinals 3 Results"	September 2, 2026	Wednesday 8 p.m.	0.3	3.83	
18	"Quarterfinals 4"	September 8, 2026	Tuesday 8 p.m.	0.4	4.47	
19	"Quarterfinals 4 Results"	September 8, 2026	Tuesday 10 p.m.	0.3	3.55	
20	"Semifinals"	September 15, 2026	Tuesday 8 p.m.	0.4	4.43	
21	"Semifinals Results"	September 16, 2026	Wednesday 8 p.m.	0.3	3.82	
22	"Finale"	September 22, 2026	Tuesday 9 p.m.	0.3	3.90	
23	"Finale Results"	September 23, 2026	Wednesday 9 p.m.	0.3	4.07	
