= The Seven Stupidest Things to Escape From =

Comedy television program

- Created by: Jonathan Goodwin
- Starring: Jonathan Goodwin; Stuart Unwin; Keith Harvey
- Country of origin: United Kingdom

Production
- Producer: Goodwin Productions
- Running time: 47 minutes (not including advertisements)

Original release
- Network: Channel 4
- Release: 7 November 2005

The Seven Stupidest Things to Escape From is a television comedy programme in which Jonathan Goodwin, the extreme escapologist tries to come up with the stupidest things to escape from. These include 50,000 bees and a dog.
