= Young & Strange =

British comedy magicians

- Born: Richard Young; July 24, 1984 (age 42) Sam Strange; November 30, 1984 (age 41)
- Occupations: Magicians, entertainers
- Known for: Magic, comedy

Young & Strange (Richard Young and Sam Strange) are a British comedy magic double act. The duo perform on stages around the world with a magic, comedy and illusion show and currently headline the touring production of Champions of Magic which frequently tours theatres in North America.

Young & Strange have also been featured on numerous magic and comedy based television shows around the world including Penn & Teller: Fool Us, ITV’s The Next Great Magician and NBC’s Caught on Camera with Nick Cannon.

== Career ==
Young & Strange began as rival magicians in their hometown of Oxford, both owning almost identical magic businesses performing for private and corporate events until they put on their first show together at The Thame Players Theatre in Oxfordshire in 2010 and went on to perform at the Edinburgh Festival Fringe for four years.

In addition to performing in the duo, Richard Young also hosts the magic podcast series The Magicians' Podcast on iTunes and Spotify which has featured interviews with magicians including David Copperfield, Derren Brown and Teller.

Between 16th July to 30 August 2021 Young & Strange were one of the main cast members of Wonderville, a variety show at the Palace Theatre in the West End of London.

In 2026, Young & Strange auditioned for the 21st season of America's Got Talent in which they managed to get through to the semi-final stage.

== Viral video ==
In 2015, a video surfaced depicting Young and Strange supposedly photobombing a Sky News TV broadcast, performing an illusion known as "the shrinking man" behind the Sky News presenter Ashish Joshi as he was apparently broadcasting outside the Houses of Parliament. It was later revealed that Joshi was in on the joke, and that the video was created independently in the style of Sky News, with Sky News confirming this via Twitter.

== Awards ==
- The Magic Circle's Carlton Comedy Award
