= Pete Firman =

English magician, comedian and television presenter

- Born: Peter Firman; Middlesbrough, England
- Occupations: Comedian, illusionist, television presenter, actor
- Years active: 2003–present
- Website: petefirman.co.uk

Peter "Pete" Firman is an English magician, comedian, television presenter and actor.

He has appeared in magic shows on BBC1, ITV, Channel 4, Five, and Sky1. He was also the presenter of two game shows on CBBC: Stake Out and Wait for It..!, and one of the regular magicians on series 2 of the BBC One show The Magicians. Firman performs live in theatres and comedy clubs worldwide.

== Early life ==
Born in Middlesbrough, Firman began his interest in magic as a child of eight when his mother bought him a magic book. He was educated at Acklam Grange Secondary School, where he twice won the school talent show. He then studied at Middlesbrough College then at the School of Arts & New Media unit of the University of Hull Scarborough Campus in Scarborough where he gained a Bachelor of Arts in theatre.

Firman performed his magic in pubs and as he later explained: "anywhere I could get paid for doing tricks, basically. I figured I wanted somewhere a bit more regular to work, and I saw the comedy circuit as something I could explore. Because I'd always tried to make the magic I was doing funny and lighthearted, and I never took myself too seriously."

== Career ==
Firman's first big break came in 2002 when he responded to an advert from Objective Productions, who were searching for new magicians for a new television show, Monkey Magic. Together with writer Paul Outhwaite and musician Andy Elvin, the three friends formed a short lived comedy team, "Threefellas" and made a short film of Firman doing tricks in the local area. He sent in a tape of himself in his underpants performing magic in Outhwaite's back garden and was chosen almost instantly. "Threefellas" made a few more short films before disbanding. In April 2003 the cast of Monkey Magic had their first meeting and Firman met fellow magician Ali Cook with whom he later shared a flat for two and a half years. During this time they wrote routines for The Greatest Magic Tricks in the Universe... Ever, the second series of Monkey Magic and The Secret World of Magic.

The first seven-part series of Monkey Magic was broadcast on Five in 2003 as well as a Christmas special. The show featured a team of four magicians each with their own unique style and personality. It was short listed for a British Comedy Award and nominated for a Rose d'Or. A second series of Monkey Magic aired in 2004, which saw his first Mr Ball routine.

Firman co-hosted The Greatest Magic Tricks in the Universe... Ever series on Five which saw a countdown of the "most amazing tricks of all time" from Horace Goldin's sawing a woman in half illusion to David Copperfield's Vanishing the Statue of Liberty illusion.

In The Secret World of Magic, which aired on Sky1 in 2005, Firman travelled the world with Ali Cook, interviewing the world's greatest magicians, including Mac King, Juan Tamariz and Max Maven, whilst also performing their own brand of sleight of hand on the streets of Paris, Madrid, New York City, Los Angeles, Las Vegas and Buenos Aires. He also did a Mr Ball routine in The Secret World of Magic which was developed by him and Ali Cook.

Dirty Tricks was a six-part series in 2005 on Channel 4, hosted by Firman along with Barry and Stuart. It was described as "like magic meets Natural Born Killers" by critic Sam Wollaston of The Guardian. The show had regular spots from Ali Cook and Jonathan Goodwin as well as guest appearances from international variety acts and celebrities including Penn & Teller, Stephen Fry, Mylene Klass and Kevin James. The show was nominated for a Rose d'Or.

Firman was a special guest on Don't Miss a Trick, a one-off family show version of The Real Hustle, which first aired on 25 August 2008 on BBC One.

Pete Firman has hosted two game shows, Stake Out in 2008 and Wait For It..!, in 2009. Both aired on BBC1.

In 2009 he appeared in "Derren Brown Presents: 3D Magic Spectacular".

The Magicians was a primetime Saturday night series for BBC1 that aired in 2012. It was the first magic show in 30 years to be broadcast live. Firman was one of the featured magicians, along with Barry and Stuart and Jason Latimer.

In 2016 he appeared as a contestant in the first series of ITV's The Next Great Magician.

== Theatre ==
In 2007 Firman performed his debut solo show Hokum at the Underbelly as part of the Edinburgh Festival Fringe. Since then he has performed each year at the festival, returning with a brand new show every time, most recently in 2018 with Marvels at the Pleasance Beyond. His shows have been critically acclaimed by the press and he has been described by The Telegraph as "the new poster-boy for British comedy magic."

He has toured the UK several times with his solo theatre shows.

In July 2008 he was invited to perform in Montreal, Canada, as part of the Just for Laughs comedy festival.

== Author ==
In 2006, Firman wrote his first book, Tricks to Freak Out Your Friends, in which he reveals secrets such as "how to crack your nose", "how to take a bite out of a glass" and "how to stick a barbecue skewer through your tongue". It also included simple card tricks and how to swallow knives. It has a foreword from Derren Brown.

== Television ==
- Monkey Magic (2003)
- The Greatest Magic Tricks in the Universe... Ever (2003)
- Monkey Magic 2 (2004)
- The Secret World of Magic (2005)
- Dirty Tricks (2005)
- Greatest Ever Comedy Movies (2006)
- Greatest Ever Disaster Movies (2007)
- Saturday LIVE Again (2007)
- The Convention Crasher (2007)
- Comedy Cuts (2008)
- Don't Miss A Trick (2008)
- For One Night Only (2008)
- Stake Out (CBBC game show)
- Derren Brown Presents: 3D Magic Spectacular (2009)
- Wait For It..! (2009)
- This Morning (2010)
- Comedy Rocks with Jason Manford (2011)
- Edinburgh Comedy Fest Live (2011)
- E4 Comedy Summit (2011)
- TV's 50 Greatest Magic Tricks (2011)
- The Magicians (2012)
- BBC Breakfast (2012)
- The One Show (2012)
- Something For The Weekend (2012)
- The Body Shocking Show (2013)
- Celebrity Mastermind (2013)
- Come Dine With Me - Comedians Special (2013)
- The Sarah Millican Television Programme (2013)
- Jon Richardson Grows Up (2014)
- Edinburgh Comedy Fest Live (2014)
- The John Bishop Show (2015)
- The Magic Show Story (2015)
- Now You See It (2015)
- When Magic Tricks Go Horribly Wrong (2016)
- The Next Great Magician (2016)
- Weekend (2016)
- BBC Breakfast (2016)
- Tommy Cooper Forever (2017)
- Let's Sing & Dance for Comic Relief (2017)
- Tonight at the London Palladium (2017)
- Don't Unleash the Beast (2020)
- Good Omens (series 2, 2023)

== Theatre ==
- 2018/19 - Marvels - UK Tour
- 2018 - Marvels - Edinburgh Fringe Festival
- 2016 - Trix - UK Tour
- 2016 - Trix - Edinburgh Fringe Festival
- 2015 - Super Duper - Edinburgh Fringe Festival
- 2014 - Trickster - UK Tour
- 2014 - Trickster - Edinburgh Fringe Festival
- 2013 - Scoundrel - Edinburgh Fringe Festival
- 2013 - Hoodwinker - UK Tour
- 2012 - Hoodwinker - Edinburgh Fringe Festival
- 2012 - Jiggery Pokery - UK Tour
- 2011 - Jiggery Pokery - Edinburgh Fringe Festival
- 2010 - Jokes & Tricks - UK Tour
- 2010 - Jokes & Tricks - Edinburgh Fringe Festival
- 2009 - The Pete Firman Magic Show - Edinburgh Fringe Festival
- 2008 - FlimFlam - UK Tour
- 2008 - FlimFlam - Edinburgh Fringe Festival
- 2007 - Hokum - Edinburgh Fringe Festival

== Bibliography ==
- Tricks to Freak Out Your Friends (2006)
