= Luís de Matos =

Portuguese magician (born 1970)

Luis de Matos
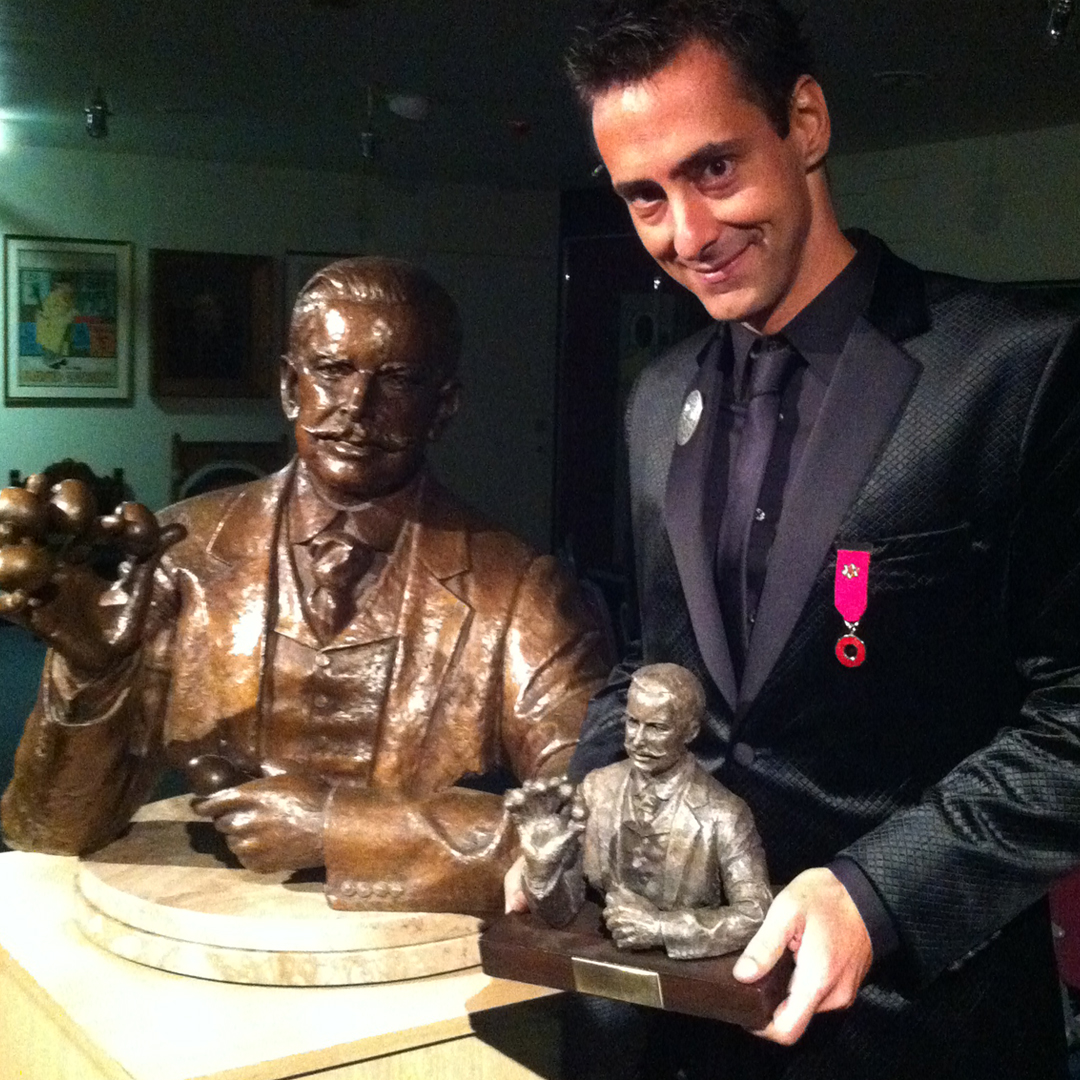
- "The Devant Award" Luis de Matos at The Magic Circle Awards in October 2013.
- Born: Luis Manuel Curcialeiro Godinho de Matos; August 23, 1970 (age 56); Lourenço Marques, Portuguese Mozambique
- Occupation: Magician
- Website: www.luisdematos.com

Luís Manuel Curcialeiro Godinho de Matos (born 23 August 1970) is a Portuguese magician. In 2013, he was a co-winner of the "Golden Grolla" alongside Lu Chen and Dynamo. On 19 October 2013, he received "The Devant Award" from The Magic Circle, becoming its youngest recipient.

== Life and career ==
Luis de Matos was born in 1970 in Maputo (then called Lourenço Marques), Portuguese Mozambique. At the age of five, he moved with his parents to Portugal, where the family settled in Avelar, a civil parish of the municipality of Ansião. At age 14, he moved to Coimbra to complete his technical studies, living with his cousins. He earned a bachelor's degree (B.Ag) in agricultural technical engineering from Escola Superior Agrária de Coimbra (ESAC), part of the Instituto Politécnico de Coimbra (IPC).

He had his first guest appearances on television in 1990. Two years later, he hosted his own television series entitled "Isto é Magia!" ("This is Magic"). This was followed by several other TV magic shows.

In 1995, he predicted the winning numbers of Portugal national lottery one week in advance, leading to his rise in prominence. A journalist described him as going from being "the cute kid who does tricks" to being compared to David Copperfield in Portugal.

In the following years, he won several international prizes, such as "Magician of the Year" (Hollywood Academy of Magical Arts−1999) and the “Mandrake d’or” (French Society of Magicians−2000).

In 2003, he cooperated in preparing the opening ceremony for the Estádio do Dragão in Porto. During that ceremony, he had bags with pieces of blue silk distributed to the audience and asked them to hold the pieces aloft simultaneously. Then, he made all the 52,000 pieces of silk vanish, a trick that entered the Guinness Book of Records.

He has made appearances and starred as a regular in TV shows worldwide, like "Shalakabula" in Spain, BBC ”The Magicians”, and its latest Spanish version, “Por Arte de Magia”. He had a program for ten years on TVG.

In 2010, in collaboration with David Britland and Marco Tempest, Luis de Matos organized The Essential Magic Conference, which was the first online magic conference at the time. He created ESTÚDIO33 in Ansião, a TV studio, workshop, documentation center, and museum.

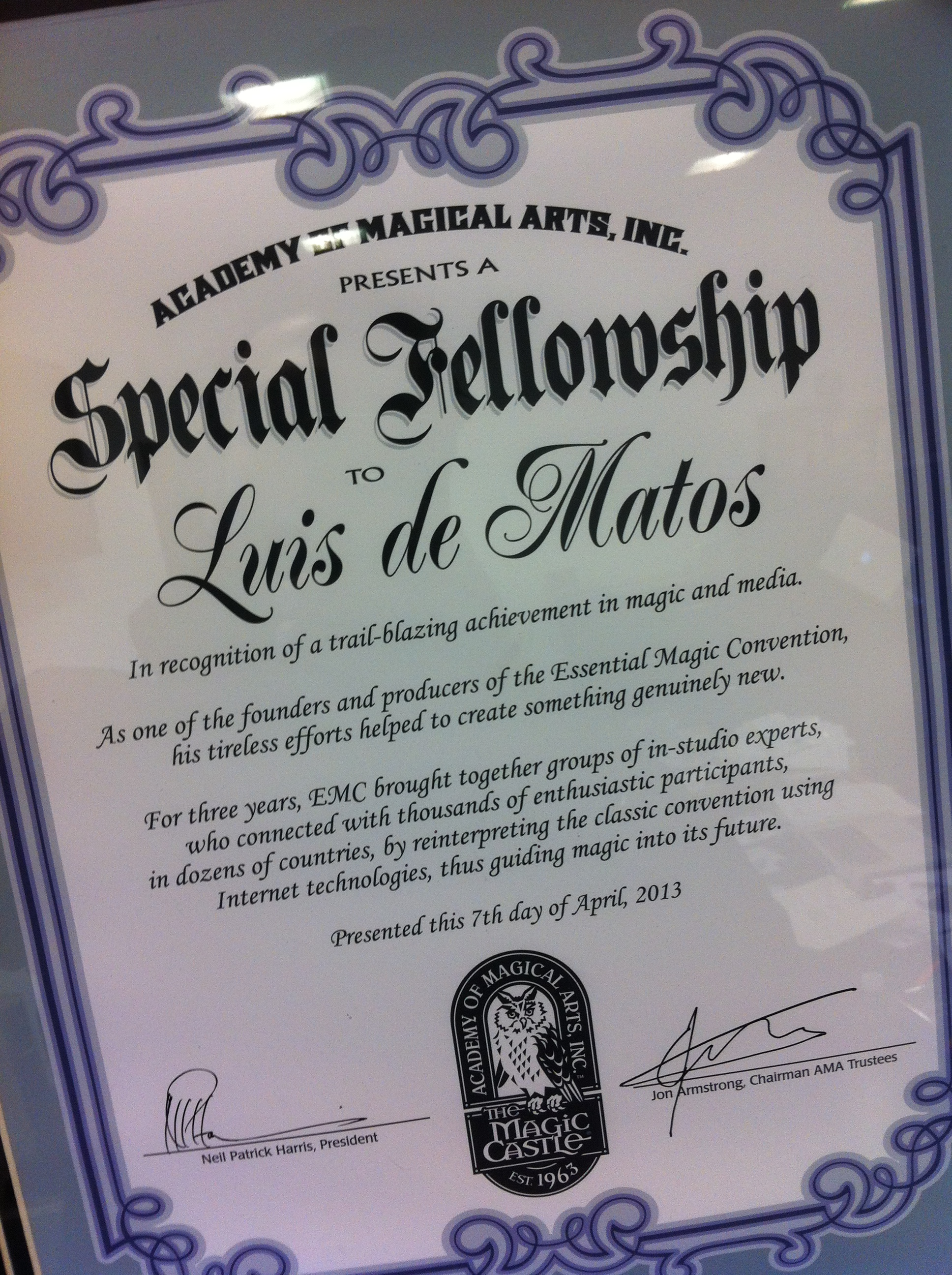
Luis de Matos "Special Fellowship Award" by the Hollywood Academy of Magical Arts, April 2013.

In 2013 Luis de Matos received his third award from the Hollywood Academy of Magical Arts, the “Special Fellowship Award."

He organizes the annual “Street Magic Festivals” in Portugal.

=== Television ===
- 1990. First professional appearance on RTP1 Christmas Special ('Natal dos Hospitais') as the ceremony's host.
- 1991. Hosts a ten-minute spot on a morning show called 'Espaço Mágico' (13 episodes) on RTP1.
- 1992. Writes and hosts 'Isto é Magia' ('This is Magic') series (40 episodes) on RTP1.
- 1991. Participates as game show host on 'Caça ao Tesouro' ('Treasure Hunt') for 96 episodes on RTP1.
- 1992. Writes and hosts 'Isto é Magia' ('This is Magic') (26 episodes) on RTP1.
- 1994. Writes and hosts 'Noite Mágica' ('Magic Night') (26 episodes) on RTP1.
- 1994. Hosts live with Ana do Carmo Festival da Canção on RTP1.
- 1995. Hosts a Portuguese talk show 'Domingo em Cheio!' (10 episodes) on RTP1.
- 1995. Participates on the 'Magiskt Show', Sweden; 'World's Greatest Magic', NBC; 'Champions of Magic', ABC.
- 1996. Writes, produces and hosts 'Ilusões com Luis de Matos' (26 episodes) on RTP1 with Sónia Araújo as his assistant.
- 1996. Participates for the second time at Monaco's 'Champions of Magic', produced by ABC.
- 2001. Writes, produces and hosts 'Luis de Matos Ao Vivo' (13 episodes) on RTP1.
- 2005. Hosts with Catarina Furtado, live on RTP1 the 'Gala Pirilampo Mágico' (Portuguese famous gala show).
- 2006. 'Luis de Matos 3D' (TV Special) on RTP1.
- 2006. Participates regularly on the Spanish TV Show 'Shalakabula' (21 episodes).
- 2006. Begins his weekly participation on Spanish TV Show 'Luar' on TVG, which is still ongoing (currently in its 9th Season of participation).
- 2008. Writes, produces and hosts 'Mistérios' (13 episodes) on RTP1.
- 2009. Participates in several international TV Shows: 'Surprise, Surprise' (Romania) and 'Le Plus Grand Cabaret Du Monde' (France).
- 2011. The Magicians, (5 TV Specials) for BBC.
- 2011. Participates on RTP1 live gala show "PORTUGAL APLAUDE" dedicated to arts.
- 2012. This is Magic, (2 TV Shows) recorded for MBC South Korea.
- 2013. Por Arte de Magia recorded in Spain for Antena 3.
- 2017. Luis de Matos Impossível live on RTP1 Portugal.

=== Tours ===
- 1999. "A Magia de Luis de Matos" ("Luis de Matos Magic"/"Mobile Theatre Tour") - first national tour (Portugal), 45 cities, 245 shows took place in a special venue created and designed by Luis de Matos called “Teatro Móvel” ("Mobile Theatre").
- 2001. "Utopia" - 12.000 spectators audience at Pavilhão Atlântico, Lisbon.
- 2002. "Luis de Matos CLOSE-UP" - touring Portugal and Spain for seven years.
- 2004. "Luis de Matos ENIGMA" - touring Portugal and Spain for five years.
- 2012. "Luis de Matos CHAOS" - touring Portugal and Spain.
- 2018-2019. "Luis de Matos IMPOSSÍVEL AO VIVO" - touring Portugal.
- 2019-2020. "Luis de Matos IMPOSSÍVEL AO VIVO" - touring Portugal.
- 2020-2021. "Luis de Matos CONECTADOS" - touring Portugal and Spain.
- 2021. "Luis de Matos BACKSTAGE" - online.

The Illusionists 2.0

- Adelaide, Australia (from 27 December 2013 to 5 January 2014)
- Sydney, Australia (from 8 to 16 January 2014)
- Brisbane, Australia (from 19 to 27 January 2014)
- Mexico City, Mexico (from 16 to 27 July 2014)
- Auckland, New Zealand (from 2 to 13 September 2014)
- Abu Dhabi, UAE (from 25 to 29 October 2014)
- Dubai, UAE Dubai World Trade Center (from 30 October to 5 November 2014)
- Istanbul, Turkey (from 13 to 17 November 2014)
- Melbourne, Australia (from 16 to 25 January 2015)
- Perth, Australia (from 14 to 19 April 2015)
- Bangkok, Thailand (from 7 to 19 April 2016)
- Hong Kong, China (from 14 to 24 April 2016)
- Singapore, Singapore (from 6 to 16 May 2016)
- Paris, France (from 17 November to 11 December 2017)
- Amsterdam, Netherlands (from 8 to 19 January 2017)
- Moscow, Russia (from 19 to 23 January 2017)
- Berlin, Germany (from 19 to 23 January 2017)
- Strasbourg, France (from 6 to 8 February 2017)
- Lille, France (from 9 to 12 February 2017)
- Antwerp, Belgium (from 13 to 19 February 2017)
- Gent, Belgium (from 20 to 26 February 2017)
- Lyon, France (from 27 February to 1 March 2017)
- Brussels, Belgium (from 2 to 5 March 2017)
- Dublin, Belgium (from 12 to 19 March 2017)
- Madrid, Spain (from 12 to 19 March 2017)
- Paris, France (from 12 to 19 March 2017)
- Prague, Czech Republic (from 8 to 15 January 2018)
- Moscow, Russia (from 15 to 19 January 2018)
- Minsk, Belarus (from 29 January to 5 February 2018)
- Kyiv, Ukraine (from 29 January to 5 February 2018)
- St, Petersburg, Russia (from 12 to 19 February 2018)
- Marseille, France (from 27 February to 1 March 2018)
- Lille, France (from 1 to 5 March 2018)
- Montecarlo, France (from 9 to 15 April 2018)
- Lyon, France (from 15 to 19 April 2018)
- Genève, Switzerland (from 19 to 23 April 2018)
- Bordeaux, France (from 23 to 27 April 2018)
- Toulouse, France (from 23 to 27 April 2018)

=== Releases ===
==== Books ====
- "O Mundo Mágico de Luis de Matos" ("Luis de Matos Magic World") | Publisher Gradiva | 1995 - Author.
- "Hocus Pocus" by Paul Kieve | Publisher Dom Quixote | 2009 - Preface by Luis de Matos.
- "Luis de Matos Livro dos Segredos" | Publisher Porto Editora | 2016 - Author - Preface by David Copperfield

==== DVDs ====
- "Luis de Matos HOME TOUR" | released and distributed by Jornal de Notícias | 2002 - Author; Producer.
- "Enciclopédia Mágica" | released and distributed by Jornal de Notícias | 2003 - Author; Producer.
- “Luis de Matos EXTREME Human Body Stunts for Professionals” | Essential Magic Collection | 2009 - Author; Producer.
- "The Magic Square" | Essential Magic Collection | 2011 - Author; Producer.
- "The Egg Bag" | Essential Magic Collection | 2013 - Author; Producer.
- "The Floating Ball" | Essential Magic Collection | 2014 - Author; Producer.

==== Magic Kits ====
- "Luis de Matos MAGICUS" | Includes Original DVD | 2011 | Concentra.
- "Isto é Magia!" | 2006 | Concentra.
- "SCHHH... Isto é Segredo!" | Includes Original VHS | Frenesim.

== Awards ==
- 1986 - "Best Newcomer" Award - "7th International Magic Festival" at Figueira da Foz (Portugal)
- 1987 - Second Place in "Close-Up" - "1st Magic National Congress" at Figueira da Foz (Portugal)
- 1989 - Winner in "Manipulation" at the "2nd Magic National Congress" at Figueira da Foz (Portugal)
- 1995 - "Award of Merit" - Hollywood Academy of Magical Arts
- 1996 - "Troféu Nova Gente" - People's Choice (Portugal)
- 1998 - "The Merlin Award, Best Close-Up Magician” - International Magicians Society
- 1999 - "Magician of the Year" - Hollywood Academy of Magical Arts
- 1999 - “Mandrake d’Or” - French Academy of Illusionists (Paris, France)
- 2010 - "The Merlin Award, Magician Of The Decade" - International Magicians Society
- 2013 - "Special Fellowship Award" - Hollywood Academy of Magical Arts
- 2013 - "Magic Golden Grolla, Il grande rivoluzionario della magia” - The Masters of Magic (Italy)
- 2013 - Luis de Matos was awarded with The Golden Medal of the City of Coimbra (Portugal)
- 2013 - "The Devant Award" - The Magic Circle (London)
- 2014 - Luis de Matos was awarded "Comendador da Ordem do Infante D. Henrique" - Presidency of the Portuguese Republic
