= Jonathan Goodwin (escapologist) =

Welsh escapologist (born 1980)

- Born: 20 February 1980 (age 46); Haverfordwest, Pembrokeshire, Wales
- Occupations: escape artist and daredevil
- Years active: 2005–2021
- Spouse: Katy (divorced)
- Partner(s): Amanda Abbington (2021–present; engaged)
- Children: 1
- Website: thedaredevil.com

Jonathan Goodwin (born 20 February 1980) is a Welsh former escapologist and daredevil, who retired after severing his spinal cord, amongst other severe injuries, during a 2021 stunt.

== Early life ==
Goodwin was born in Haverfordwest, Pembrokeshire, Wales, and grew up in Robeston Wathen. He attended the since-closed Tasker Milward Voluntary Controlled School in Haverfordwest.

== Career ==
He first appeared on Channel 4 TV programme Dirty Tricks and has subsequently appeared in TV specials The Seven Stupidest Things to Escape From, Deathwish Live, and Monkey Magic, as well as Discovery Channel's One Way Out and How Not to Become Shark Bait in which he allowed himself to be attacked by a Caribbean reef shark. Goodwin returned to Discovery Channel in 2009 for a ten-part series of One Way Out which also starred engineer Terry Stroud. He also appeared in an episode of the Channel 4 programme Balls of Steel, with his father helping him with a stunt.

On 11 September 2012, it was announced that Goodwin would be appearing in his own series on UKTV's Watch, entitled The Incredible Mr. Goodwin. The show included a wide variety of stunts, from free climbing skyscrapers to "extreme planking", and started airing in early 2013. It was also shown on UKTV's Dave and on BBC America beginning in July 2013.

On 9 March 2013, Goodwin appeared on The Jonathan Ross Show and performed the stunt of lying on a single nail and having a breeze block broken on his chest with a sledgehammer.

In April 2019, he appeared on the 13th series of Britain's Got Talent, and made it to the finals performing "buried alive", the first time this stunt had ever been attempted on a stage. He finished in eighth place overall.

Goodwin performed on the Las Vegas show Fantasy at the Luxor between October 2020 and September 2021. As part of one set, he used a bullwhip. In another set, he was blindfolded as he used a crossbow to hit progressively tinier objects held in the hands and mouth of a helper.

In 2020, he appeared on America's Got Talent, where he finished as a semifinalist.

== Injuries ==
In October 2021, Goodwin was hospitalised following injuries sustained during a stunt rehearsal for America's Got Talent: Extreme. The stunt was supposed to involve Goodwin escaping from a straitjacket while suspended upside-down 30 feet between two cars. Instead, he became crushed between the cars as they caught fire.

Goodwin sustained many injuries, including third-degree burns, a broken spine, a severed spinal cord, and two broken shoulder blades. He shattered both legs and lost a kidney. He was discharged from hospital in February 2022 but was left paralysed from the waist down, requiring the use of a wheelchair.

== Personal life ==
Goodwin is divorced from his first wife, Katy, with whom he has a daughter.

Goodwin is engaged to actress Amanda Abbington. They had been social media friends for a decade, but met only after her split from Martin Freeman. They spoke by phone for some time before meeting in person. Goodwin proposed marriage within 30 minutes of their first meeting, in Vienna, which Abbington accepted.

Around five weeks after they got engaged, Goodwin's accident occurred. Not knowing if he would survive surgery, he thanked Abbington for their time together and offered her a release on their engagement, in light of his paralysis, which she rejected. The couple live north of London, in Hertfordshire.
