= The Story of Light Entertainment =

The Story of Light Entertainment is a British documentary series shown on the BBC in 2006. The series comprises eight episodes and is narrated by Stephen Fry.

== Episode 1: Double Acts ==
- Air date – 22 July
- Double acts covered include Abbott and Costello, Newman and Baddiel, The Two Ronnies, Morecambe and Wise, Hale and Pace, Little and Large, Mike and Bernie Winters, Peter Cook and Dudley Moore, French and Saunders, Adrian Edmondson and Rik Mayall, Fry and Laurie, Reeves and Mortimer, Smith and Jones, Little Britain, Ant and Dec.

== Episode 2: All-Round Entertainers ==
- Air date – 29 July

== Episode 3: Radio Stars ==
- Air date – 5 August

== Episode 4: The Comics ==
- Air date – 12 August

== Episode 5: Pop and Easy Listening ==
- Air date – 19 August
- Guests included Terry Wogan, Cliff Richard, and Jimmy Savile.

== Episode 6: Impressionists ==
- Air date – 26 August
- Covers Mike Yarwood, Doubletake, Spitting Image, and That Was the Week That Was.

== Episode 7: Chat Shows ==
- Air date – 2 September
- Guests included David Frost, Sally Jessy Raphael, Clive James, Graham Norton and Joan Rivers.

== Episode 8: Variety ==
- Air date – 9 September
