= Champions of Magic =

Touring group of magicians

Champions of Magic is a touring illusion show featuring a cast of four magicians from the UK, US and Mexico, each specializing in a different type of magic from mind reading & close-up to stage filling grand illusions.

== History ==
Champions of Magic opened in the UK in October 2013 at Reading Hexagon Theatre and has since completed 6 UK tours and a run in London. The show completed a US tour in 2017 which was extended due to demand, concluding in March 2018. This included an extended run at the Palace Theatre in Cleveland, Ohio. To date the show has been seen by over 500,000 people and received positive reviews. In the summer of 2026, the production had a long run at the Studebaker Theater in Chicago where it once again received glowing reviews. Other notable venues include but are not limited to the Microsoft Theater in LA, Kennedy Center in Washington DC and the Hammersmith Apollo in London.

== Cast ==
The founding duo Young & Strange became friends at 8 years old in the UK, bonding over their shared fascination with magic. These passions later bloomed into careers, and they have since performed on London’s West End and major stages around the world. The duo reached international fame from the video ‘Young & Strange take Las Vegas to Television,’ in which the magicians videobomb the background of a Live Sky News broadcast with one of their signature illusions. They also appeared on Season 21 of America’s Got Talent.

Fernando Velasco is a Mexican-American escape artist who first felt pulled to the trade at 11 years old, when he was able to experience the inside world of illusions through his father’s restaurant job at the Magic Castle. In 2017 at 26 years old, Velasco became the youngest escapologist to in the world to perform his interpretation of ‘Houdini’s Water Torture Cell,’ in which he was handcuffed, padlocked, and trapped upside-down in 6ft of water. In Champions of Magic, he pulls off dangerous stunts in front of a live audience.

Liberty Larsen is a fourth-generation magician of the family that founded The Magic Castle in Hollywood, Genii Magazine and the Academy of Magical Arts. She has appeared on Penn & Teller’s Fool Us and had regular shows at venues in LA. She also served as the Theatre Director and core cast member in over 500 shows at the Black Rabbit Rose, a speakeasy magic club in Hollywood.

== Performance ==
The production features mostly original magic that was created or devised by the performers and production designers. The show is known for its production including a large lighting rig and pyrotechnic effects.

== Television appearances ==
The cast of the show have appeared on television multiple times including:

Programme	Channel	Performer
The Next Great Magician	ITV	Young & Strange
Caught on Camera with Nick Cannon	NBC	Young & Strange
Today Tonight	Channel 7 (Australia)	Alex McAleer
Good Morning Britain	ITV	Alex McAleer
Penn & Teller: Fool Us Season 1	ITV	Young & Strange
Penn & Teller: Fool Us Season 4	The CW (USA)	Young & Strange
Penn & Teller: Fool Us Season 4	The CW (USA)	Kayla Drescher
The Today Show	NBC (USA)	Kayla Drescher
Link Segment	Disney Channel	Richard Young
Blue Peter	CBBC	Alex McAleer

== Charity ==
As part of their 2016 and 2018 UK tour the production held a performance exclusively for children from UK charity Rays of Sunshine at the Mermaid Theatre in London.

When touring they also support Tickets For Troops who provide free tickets to members of the armed forces and their families and Tickets For Kids which provides free tickets to disadvantaged children.
