= Timeline of magic =

History of the performing art of illusion

This timeline of magic is a history of the performing art of illusion from B.C. to the present.

== Timeline of magic ==
2700 B.C. - The reputed first known performance of a conjuring effect (balls) was said to have been done by the magician Djedi in ancient Egypt. Dedi had done other effects, such as decapitating a bird, then reattaching the head to resurrect it. (This is disputed as there is nothing in reference to Djedi, specifically in the Westcar Papyrus, to indicate that he performed the cups and balls for anyone. The famous drawing of two men seemingly performing the cups and balls, from the tomb of Baqet III at Beni Hasan is believed by most experts to show a game using pots or cups but details of the game are unknown.) (Note: Since there is no indication that Djedi performed the Cups and Balls, or ever existed and the Beni Hasan tomb painting is considered unlikely to represent the effect, there is no certain evidence for the existence of the cups and balls during this period.)

1300–650 B.C. - References to magic are abundant in the ancient Greek myths among the classical founding pagan cultures of Europe, connected to the neighbouring Egyptian and Persian ones. Often centered around women of divine origin, nymphs and priests, from Ariadne to Calypso, Circe to Medea, Hermes to Hecate, magic, divination and necromancy are widespread and intertwined with chthonic Gods and monsters, oracles and heroes.

50–300 A.D. - The Acetabularii performed the Cups and balls in ancient Rome using stones and small vinegar cups (hence the name Acetabularii). The Acetabularii are a group of magicians specializing on the cups and balls effect.

400–1000 - The Dark Ages; little is known about the history of magic, but much of it was associated with the occult and magic as entertainment is not prominent. Magic as entertainment in fact has been a cornerstone in the entertainment industry, the theater itself started as a place of magic and wonder with children being a primary focus (now more than ever). The influential pasts historic moments in magic has built what we now see in many venues of entertainment.

1000–1500 - The Middle Ages, where much magic was associated with the occult and witchcraft. The growing trading nature of society allowed some street or circus performers to make a living out of old classics such as the cups and balls and in fact more modern ideas such as cheating by short changing via sleights with coins and other small objects.

1584 - Reginald Scot publishes The Discoverie of Witchcraft, a book designed in part to counter the activities of persecutionists, but at the same time revealing many conjuring secrets of the day. Magic and witchcraft were linked, and many copies of Scot's book were burnt in the early 17th century.

1634 - Hocus Pocus Junior: The Anatomie of Legerdemain was published. This book is one of the first to include the "Cups and Balls" effect described as it was originally performed, along with the "patter" which was used during the performance. This book had twelve editions.

- Steve Burton published a hardcover edition of the 1634 first edition (1997)

1720- Isaac Fawkes, English magician, retires. His performances at fairs left him with a fortune of nearly ten thousand pounds. Among his tricks were a card on the ceiling with any card called for and his bag of many eggs. His booth is featured in Bartholomew Fair by Hogarth with a sign that says "Dexterity of Hand." He also presented impressionists and contortionists as part of his shows.

1750 - Joseph Pinetti, "considered to be the major figure of 18th century magic," is born. Pinetti is said to be the first recorded performer to do the "thumb tie effect" and he also performed second sight, exhibited automata and the orange tree illusion.

1805 - Year of birth of Jean Eugène Robert-Houdin (died 1871). The "father of modern magic", who brought it from the street and circus side shows to an elegant stage or drawing room setting.

1808 - Mayette Magie Moderne opened up in Paris becoming the first magic store.

1874 - Year of birth of Harry Houdini, A.K.A. King of Cards and King of Handcuffs (died 1926 because of a ruptured appendix). Real name Ehrich Weiss, he achieved fame as an escapologist.

1876 - The first publication of Modern Magic. Written by Professor Louis Hoffmann (1839–1919) (real name Angelo John Lewis), it was a definitive work on the state of the art of that time.

1877 - Martinka and Co. was founded by Francis and Antonio Martinka, it was run by Houdini in 1919 and is still in existence.

1886 - Tam Shepherds Trick Shop opened up in Glasgow becoming the oldest magic store in the United Kingdom.

1894 - Year of birth of Dai Vernon (died 1992). A.K.A. "The Professor" and "The Man That Fooled Houdini", he was born as David Frederick Wingfield Verner in Ottawa. One of the most influential 20th-century performing-arts magicians.

1898 - Davenports Ltd. was founded by Lewis Davenport and Davenports Magic has earned the unique distinction of being the oldest family-owned magic shop in the world.

1902 - The Expert at the Card Table is published by The Charles T. Powner Co. Written by S. W. Erdnase, is considered by serious card workers as one of the most important books written on the subject.

1902 - May 10, The Society of American Magicians is founded at Martinka's Magic Shop in New York City, New York. It is the oldest magic society in the world.

1905 - July - The Magic Circle was formed. Its first President was David Devant. This is a prestigious organization for magicians and has strict rules against exposure. (It expelled its founder twice for alleged exposure, something it has done to many famous magicians.)

1907 - Jan 15 - The Australian Society of Magicians the fourth oldest magical society in the world, was founded in Sydney, Australia. Meetings were first held at Queen's Hall, Sydney.

1911 - Our Magic by Nevil Maskelyne and David Devant – arguably one of the most important books of magic theory – is published.

1911 - The Mysto Magic Company incorporated by Gilbert, Gilbert, and Petrie.

1918 - Houdini first performs Morritt's Vanishing Elephant at the Hippodrome on January 7.

1918 - The South African Magical Society (SAMS) was formed. SAMS is also affiliated to the London Magic Circle.

1921 - P.T. Selbit performs the first "Sawing in half", something that is, in the present day, synonymous with the art of stage magic.

1926 - On All Hallows Eve at 1:26 pm, Harry Houdini dies. A statuary bust of Houdini was placed at the grave. Possibly the only one of its kind in a Jewish cemetery.

1930 - Gilbert Genesta died while performing an escape trick.

1934 - Johnny Max Thompson was born in Chicago, Illinois, U.S. (died 2019). He was awarded one of the highest honors in the magician community, a master fellowship with the academy of magic arts, widely known as a mentor and teacher of magic.

Circa 1940 - Edward M. Massey invents the finger chopper, which becomes many young magicians' first trick.

1955 & 1948 - Penn Jillette and Teller were born. The duo has been featured in the show “ Fool us”.

1949 - The first publication of Royal Road to Card Magic Written by Jean Hugard and Fred Braue, it's still an important first text for card magicians today.

1952 - The first publication of Modern Coin Magic Written by JB Bobo, considered by some the "bible" of coin magic, many other works reference this one.

1956 - David Copperfield is born on September 16, as David Seth Kotkin.

1960 - Lance Burton is born on March 10, as William Lance Burton in Louisville, Kentucky.

1963 - The Magic Castle is formed by Bill, Irene, and Milt Larsen in Hollywood USA by converting a 1908 Victorian mansion to a centre of magical excellence. Many leading magicians have performed there. Dai Vernon was a resident magician in the latter part of his life.

1968 - The book Thirteen Steps To Mentalism by Corinda was published and is one of the most famous books on mentalism.

1972 - New York's first magic show spot The Magic Towne House is opened by Ed Davis and taken over by Dorothy Dietrich (then a teenager) and Dick Brookz. It featured such notables as Frank Garcia, Jack London, Harry Blackstone, Jr., etc. Performers who got their start their included Eric DeCamps, Rocco Silano, Johnny Ace Palmer, Jeff McBride and Michael Chaut. Years later Chaut would organize Monday Night Magic after The Magic Towne House closed in the 1980s.

1974 - The musical The Magic Show starring Doug Henning opens on Broadway and ushers in a new "Golden Age" of magic.

1977 - Marco the Magi presents Le Grand David and his own Spectacular Magic Company premieres on February 20 in Beverly, Massachusetts. It runs for 35 years (until Spring of 2012) and becomes the longest running "Resident Magic Show" in history.

1977 - Jeff Sheridan, a street magician in New York's Central Park, publishes STREET MAGIC - An Illustrated History of Wandering Magicians and Their Conjuring Arts. Published by Dolphin Books, an imprint of Doubleday & Company.

1980 - In July, Dorothy Dietrich, in her teens becomes the first, and as of 2019, and the only woman to do the "jinxed" bullet catch in her mouth, often referred to as "the stunt that scared Houdini." It was done under test conditions at the annual International Brother of Magicians Convention at Point State Park in front of hundreds of paying attendees and the general public. It was televised worldwide and got international press.

1988 - The Houdini Museum opens in Scranton, PA. The only building in the world dedicated to Houdini. The exhibit was originally in NYC at The Magic Towne House, NY's first and original Houdini Museum.

1994 - The first WWW magic stores appear following the older text type newsgroups and bulletin boards. Pictorial and information sites soon follow, changing the way magic is learned and distributed.

1997 - The Masked Magician, Val Valentino, provokes much controversy by exposing magic secrets on major Fox TV specials. David Blaine brings "Street Magic" to America.

1998 - World Of Illusion at Madison Square Garden launched the career of Criss Angel, followed by Criss Angel Mindfreak which ran until 2003.

2011 - Dynamo releases a magic series Dynamo: Magician Impossible, and goes on to release 3 more series in the following years.

2011 - Destroyed by vandals, Houdini's gravesite bust returned secretly at cost of $10,000 by Houdini Museum's Dorothy Dietrich and Dick Brooks.
