= George Schindler =

American magician and entertainer

- Born: George Schindler; March 31, 1929 (age 97); Brooklyn, New York City
- Occupations: magician, actor, comedian, puppeteer, businessman

George Schindler (born March 31, 1929) is an American stage magician, magic consultant, comedian, actor, ventriloquist and writer based in New York. In addition to creating noteworthy illusions and publishing many books on magic, Schindler has performed at venues around the world and is currently "lifetime dean" of the Society of American Magicians, having previous tenure in the "S.A.M. Hall of Fame" as well as president and spokesperson. From the 1950s to the 1960s, he had also been a frequent contributor to Billboard Magazine's comedy, magic and vaudeville columns.

== Biography ==
Born in Brooklyn, Schindler first picked up an appreciation for magic at age 11 after seeing a magician at his school make a live goldfish appear in thin air. While studying card and sleight of hand illusions during his teens, Schindler entertained friends and relatives in Brooklyn and the Bronx, apprenticed for various New York City-area magic shops and eventually carried out magic acts before a community center audience in Bensonhurst. By his early twenties, he had worked his way up to nightclub, casino, theater and street festival gigs throughout New York City and Long Island.

Concurrent to his study of magic during the 1940s, Schindler had been a co-founder and early member of F.A.M.E. ("Future American Magical Entertainers"), an organization of young magicians whose alumni at the same time had also included Howie Schwarzman, Dick Brooks, Carl Ballantine and Shari Lewis, among others. Lewis' father, Abraham Hurwitz, a magician and Yeshiva University professor, headed F.A.M.E. The club lasted until Hurwitz' death in 1981, in which F.A.M.E. splintered into other groups, namely the Society of Young Magicians.

In the Summer of 1953, George Schindler traveled to Hollywood to explore the demand for magicians on the West Coast and consulted with The Magic Castle's Milt Larsen as well as various figures in the film and television industry, including cartoonist and Metro-Goldwyn-Mayer producer Sol Fielding (who had gotten Harry Belafonte his first break into movies the same year) and also George Boton, a talent casting agent for Art Baker's You Asked For It on ABC. It was during this time that Schindler was inspired to incorporate comedy and acting with magic, and by the early 1960s, he had developed a nationally syndicated program of radio gags called "Days, Dates and Data" which he produced, recorded and distributed out of his residence in Brighton Beach.

While performing shows at Manhattan's celebrity-frequented Magic Towne House in the early 1970s, Schindler met up with Frank Garcia who he would collaborate with at the venue and as a co-founder of The School for Magicians, which was active from 1973 to 1978. Both magicians also co-authored a number of books together including "Super Subtle Card Miracles" (1973), "Amedeo's Continental Magic" (1974) and "Magic with Cards" (Barnes & Noble, 1974). In 1985, Schindler debuted with his wife and magic-partner, Nina, at the Lincoln Center.

Schindler received the "Magician of the Year" award in 1986 and Backstage magazine's bistro award in 1988, the former which he shared with Jeff McBride. The following year he worked onstage as an illusionist consultant with director Gregory Mosher for two off-Broadway plays: Shel Silverstein's The Devil and Billy Markum, which starred Dennis Locorriere; and David Mamet's Bobby Gould in Hell, which starred William H. Macy, Treat Williams and Felicity Huffman.

In 1992, Schindler was elected as president of S.A.M. and named its "dean" in 2005, succeeding Jay Marshall.

Schindler's recent activity has included coaching aspiring magicians and ventriloquists, lectures on performance technique and the history of magic and magicians. Schindler was also instrumental in having an official S.A.M. "holiday" commemorate Harry Houdini (who was the S.A.M. president from 1917 to 1926), and worked with fellow magician, collaborator and Houdini Museum curator Dorothy Dietrich in promoting the past magician's life, career and legacy.

== Television and film appearances ==
George Schindler has appeared as a guest on many talk shows, including the 07/08/1976 episode (#214) of CBS's The Mike Douglas Show and episodes of The Morning Show in the 1980s, in which host Regis Philbin participated in the magician's card/sawing illusions. Schindler discussed both his life and his 50 years in the magic profession with Barbara Walters on a 1999 episode of The View.

During the 1970s, Schindler was the voice of character "The Great Nabisco" in a series of Oreo TV commercials.

In 1989, Schindler starred in the Woody Allen-directed segment of New York Stories, Oepedius Wrecks (starring Allen, Mia Farrow, Julie Kavner, Kirsten Dunst and Larry David). Schindler played a theater magician who makes Allen's character's mother (played by Mae Questel) disappear. Woody Allen previously considered Wallace Shawn for the role but wanted a real magician to both play the part and perform the act, and personally cast Schindler.

Schindler was also featured in the program The Art of Ventriloquism, produced for New York's PBS affiliate WNET.

== Published works ==
George Schindler has authored various books catered to learning or intermediate magicians, the most notable titles including:

- "Magic with Everyday Objects: Over 150 Tricks Anyone Can Do at the Dinner Table"(Henry Holt and Company, 1976)
- "Presto! Magic for the Beginner" (Dover Publications, 1977)
- "Ventriloquism: Magic with Your Voice" (Dover Publications, 1979)
- "Basic Balloon Sculpture" (Penguin Group/Show Biz Services, 1983)

He also worked with Larry Sloman on the book, The Secret Life of Houdini (Simon & Schuster, 2006), a comprehensive biography on the historical magician/escape artist.
