= Future American Magical Entertainers =

F.A.M.E. (Future American Magical Entertainers) was a pioneering organization in the magic field for adolescents and teenagers that existed in New York City, United States from the early 1940s until the early 1980s. Initially it had been called the Peter Pan Magic Club until the name change of F.A.M.E. in the early 1950s. After overseer Abraham "Abe" Hurwitz died in 1981, the remnants of the club became the Society of Young Magicians, which was started by F.A.M.E alum Dick Brooks.

Many early F.A.M.E. members would go on to become famous American magicians, magic consultants, puppeteers, and motion picture and television personalities. Most notably, Shari Lewis (daughter of overseer "Abe" Hurwitz) would gain major recognition in the Emmy and Peabody award-winning children's TV series Lamb Chop on PBS; Stan Burns would principally star with Madonna in Desperately Seeking Susan (1985) and in Woody Allen's Radio Days (1987), both as a New York ventriloquist; George Schindler would write for many Billboard magic/comedy columns (1950s-1960s), publish at least 8 magic books, do TV commercial voice acting, star as a magician in Woody Allen's New York Stories (1989) and hold title as spokesman, president and dean of the Society of American Magicians; and Dick Brooks would open the Magic Towne House (now closed) in Manhattan and the Houdini Museum, the Only Building in the World Dedicated to Houdini, in Scranton, Pennsylvania with collaborator Dorothy Dietrich.

== Founder ==
Dr. Abraham Hurwitz, known as "Peter Pan the Magic Man", originally headed the club. Hurwitz was a Yeshiva University education professor who was so reputed in the American magic scene that he was named New York City's "official magician" by then-Mayor Fiorello La Guardia.

Hurwitz was a city recreation director when Mayor La Guardia gave him the official magician title during the Depression. For 18 years, he took his magic show to schools and recreation centers and put on annual magic shows in parks in every NYC borough. For years after he left the department he continued his magic shows as a volunteer. Among his protégés was his daughter, television star Shari Lewis, the world-famous ventriloquist and developer of Lamb Chop.

Hurwitz was born in Lithuania in 1905. He graduated from City College of New York, obtained his master's degree from Columbia University and his Ph.D. in educational guidance from New York University. He began mixing magic with teaching as a guidance counselor at the Brooklyn Hebrew Orphanage. He retired from Yeshiva in 1974 and died on September 29, 1981.

== Early members ==
A few earlier members of the Peter Pan Magic Club before it changed its name to F.A.M.E. included George Schindler, Stan Burns, George Gilbert (Lott), Albert Goshman, Ken Krenzel, Jack London (Harry Rifas), Danny O'Brien (Blackwood), George Sands, Vic Sendax, Len Cooper, Sonny Sklar, Jerry Bergman, Howie Schwarzman and Shari Lewis.

== Name change to F.A.M.E. ==
In the 1950s, the then members decided the name of the club was childish and changed it to FAME Future American Magical Entertainers and included Dick Brooks, Ken Silverman (who became a Pulitzer Prize winning author and wrote a biography of Houdini), John Hope, Robert A. Olson, (Hope and Olson later wrote a column on coin magic in Hugard's Magic Monthly), Richard Bangs, Al Callus, David Levy, Burt Kaplan, Jeff Spiller, Dan Ritchard, Mike Eberton, Melvin Kelger, Sheldon Weiner, Mike Goldstein, Leonard Heller, Kichi Iamoto, Hank Lifson, Jerry Goldstein and many others. (see official 1952 roster) At that time it was run by Antoinette Deutch, Bob White, and Lou Dick. The acronym FAME came about when the members decided the Peter Pan name was a bit childish, especially after a comment from comedy magician Carl Ballantine, "I love your peanut butter". The FAME acronym was suggested by Dick Brooks (entertainer). Among later magicians who joined included Jeff Spiller, Diane Zalph, Jeff Silverstein, Debbie Leifer, Jeff Sheridan, Robin Lane, and others.

== Society of American Magicians ==
In the early 1960s the S.A.M. sponsored a club for young magicians known as the I.M.P.S. (Independent Magical Performers Society). This club had its original branch in New York City under the direction of veteran magician (and inventor of magical apparatus) Arnold Belais, who was in his late 70's; at most meetings, Belais was assisted by Marshall Johnson, a magic enthusiast who was employed as a television producer/director at the CBS studios on 57th St.

During its peak, the I.M.P.S. met once a month in Manhattan at the West Side YMCA on West 63rd St; here, in addition to giving the young members a chance to perform and polish their technique, adult performers/lecturers would often take part in the proceedings by offering guidance, advice, and impromptu performances for the young magicians and ventriloquists that comprised the club. Several times in the mid and late 1960s, the group was even visited by talent scout Mark Letti (who was well known in NY entertainment circles as a 'talent spotter' for Ed Sullivan's popular Sunday night television variety show).

In addition to their I.M.P.S. sponsorship, the S.A.M. awarded "scholarships" to qualifying IMPS when they became old enough to apply for SAM membership. A North Jersey branch was established in the late 1960s that met in Tenafly as well as another New Jersey branch which met several times a year in Perth Amboy (until the late 1960s). The New York I.M.P.S. club remained active into the 1970s (although meeting less frequently) and for a brief time survived the passing of its founding leader, Arnold Belais. Currently, young people can join a new organization, SYM Society of Young Magicians, which is a branch of the Society of American Magicians. SYM was conceived in 1981 and founded in 1984 by 6 members of the S.A.M. Dan Rodriguez, Edward Schuman, Ray-Mond, Wendel Gibson, Dick Laneau and Donald Lea.

== Sources ==
- Thanks to magician and Dean and former SAM President George Schindler for his help in accumulating and checking the accuracy of much of the information on this page.
- The Who's Who in Magic
- Obituary: Abraham Hurwitz Dead at 76
