= Brother Theodore =

German-American actor

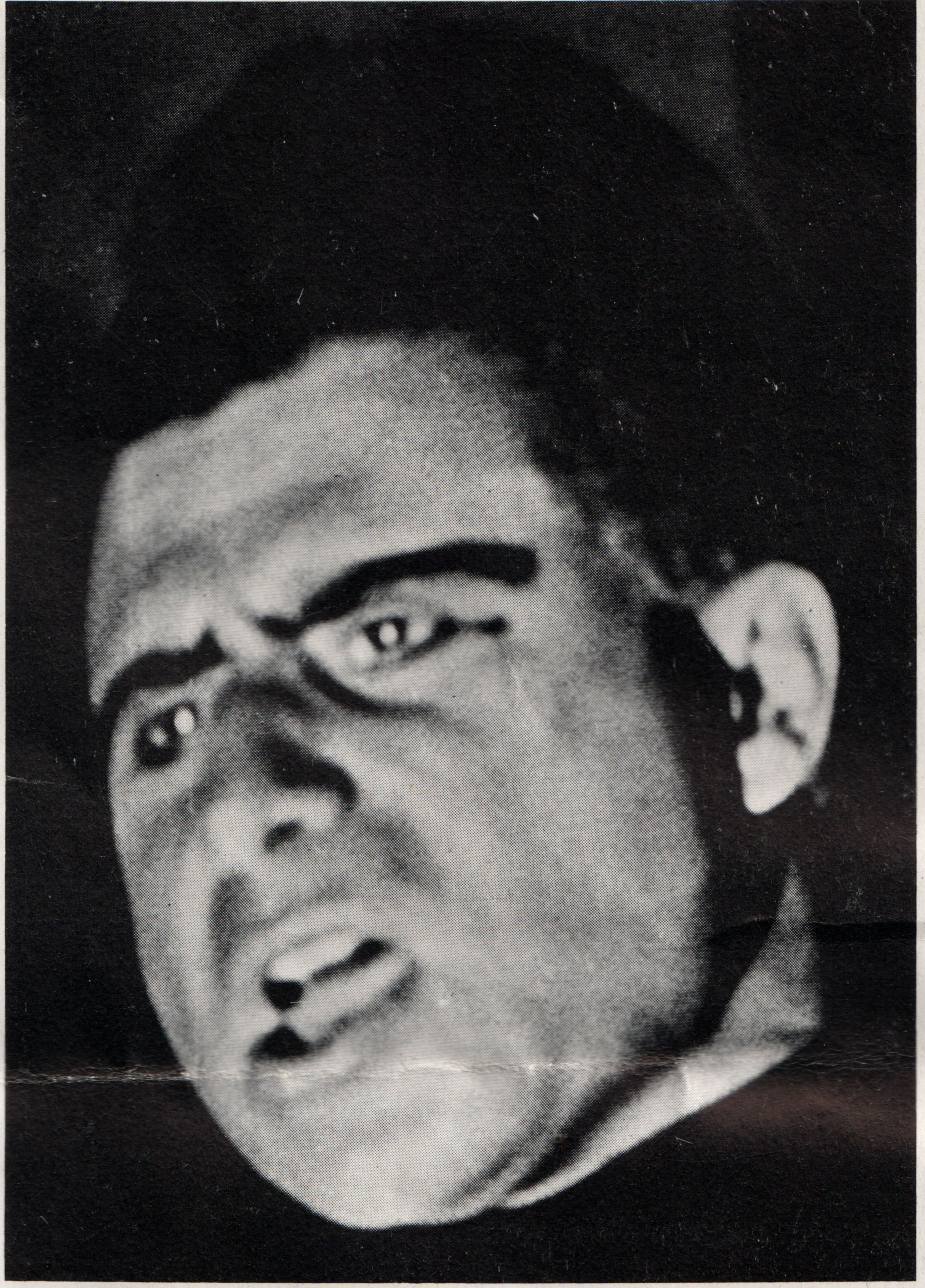
- Brother Theodore on stage, as shown in an early-1970s publicity brochure
- Born: Theodore Gottlieb; November 11, 1906; Vienna, Austria-Hungary
- Died: April 5, 2001 (aged 94); New York City, New York, U.S.
- Years active: 1946–2001
- Children: 1

Theodore Isidore Gottlieb (November 11, 1906 – April 5, 2001), professionally known as Brother Theodore, was a German-American actor and comedian, known for his post–World War II career in the U.S. delivering rambling, stream-of-consciousness monologues. His style, which he called "stand-up tragedy", was similar to Diseuse or Kabarett, which was popular in Western Germany during the 1920s and '30s.

== Early years ==
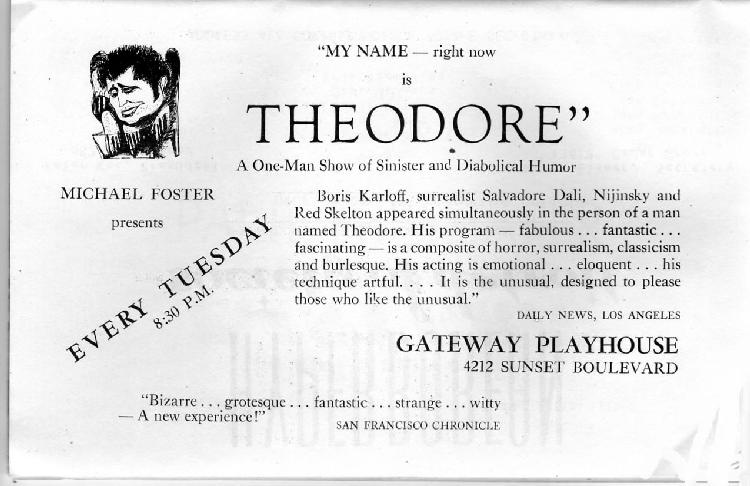
1946 advertisement for theatrical performance by Brother Theodore

Gottlieb was born in Vienna, the son of a magazine publisher. Raised in a Jewish family, he moved with his mother to Düsseldorf in the Rhine Province of Germany after her divorce and marriage to a wealthy textile manufacturer. He attended the University of Cologne. At age 32, under Nazi rule, he was imprisoned at the Dachau concentration camp until he signed over his family's fortune for one Reichsmark. After emigrating to Switzerland, he was deported for chess hustling. He then went to Austria, where Albert Einstein, a family friend, helped him emigrate to the United States.

=== In the United States ===
He worked as a janitor at Stanford University, where he demonstrated his prowess at chess by beating 30 professors simultaneously, and he later became a dockworker in San Francisco. He played bit parts in two films starring Orson Welles: The Stranger (1946, also directed by Welles) and The Third Man. These were some of the several movie appearances he made beginning in the 1940s and continuing into the 1990s. These were mostly small parts in B-movies.

He provided the voice of Gollum in the 1977 made-for-television animated version of The Hobbit and the follow-up adaptation of The Return of the King (1980). He also voiced Ruhk, Mommy Fortuna's assistant and carnival barker in The Last Unicorn (1982).

He collaborated with Marvin Kaye on a novella published in 1981 called The Possession of Immanuel Wolf.

== Career ==
=== Success ===
Theodore's career as a monologuist began in California in the mid-1940s, with dramatic Poe recitals and darkly humorous monologues. A 1946 advertisement lists "Theodore" (not yet "Brother Theodore") performing "A One-Man Show of Sinister and Diabolical Humor" weekly at the Gateway Playhouse on Sunset Boulevard. He moved to New York City, and by the 1950s he had attracted a cult following. In 1958, he presented a one-man show that promoted "quadrupedism", the idea that human beings should walk on all fours. Jay Landesman booked him at St. Louis' Crystal Palace in the 1960s.

In the early 1960s, he frequently performed at the Café Bizarre in New York's Greenwich Village (106 W 3rd Street). He reached a wider audience through television, with 36 appearances on The Merv Griffin Show in the 1960s and '70s, and was a guest on The Tonight Show Starring Johnny Carson, The Dick Cavett Show, and The Joey Bishop Show. After his nightclub and TV appearances in the 1950s and '60s waned, he retired in the mid-1970s.

=== Comeback ===
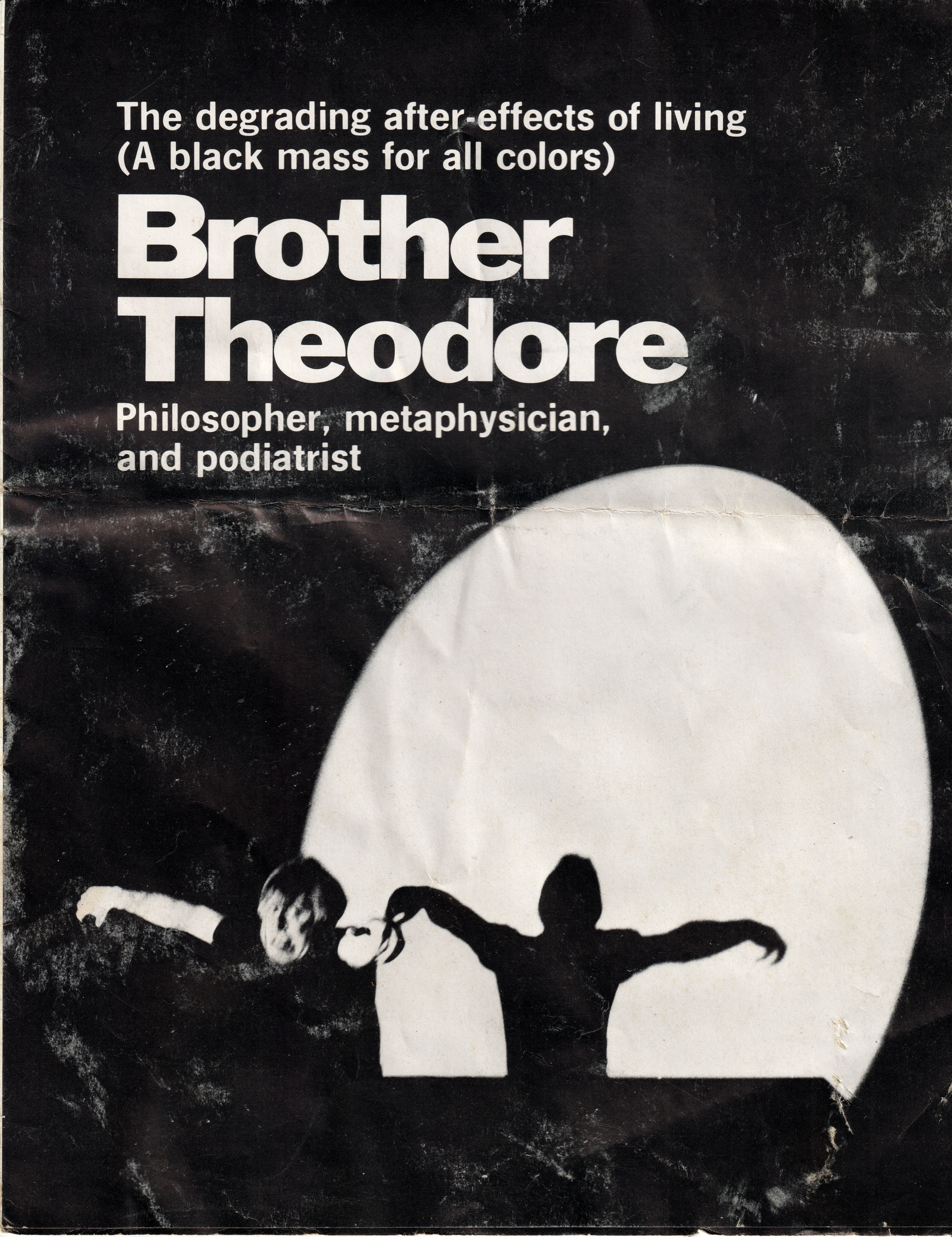
Brother Theodore publicity poster

He was pulled out of retirement and booked by magicians Dorothy Dietrich and Dick Brooks in the Magic Towne House on the affluent Upper East Side of Manhattan for special weekend midnight performances. Years earlier, Brooks had remembered seeing Brother Theodore drawing large crowds at small, eclectic clubs across the Lower East Side (Greenwich and the East Village) and sought him out to appear at his new club. This resulted in a resurgence of interest in Brother Theodore that brought him success in his later years starting with Tom Snyder's Tomorrow Show in 1977 followed by more TV appearances and movies.

According to Brooks, it took multiple calls to Theodore to convince him to make a comeback. Theodore's attitude was very bleak, and he felt his career was over. Brooks wanted to charge ten or more dollars, but Theodore insisted on four dollars, so as not to scare people away. The show was a success and ran for three years. A picture of the Magic Towne House ad appeared in local New York newspapers such as the Village Voice and The New York Post.

In an interview for MUM, The Society of American Magicians official magazine, Dietrich said:

Dick knew him. As a kid Dick used to see him around the village and they would be lined up around the block to see him. The stage was black with a pin spot on a desk which was raked towards the audience. The light comes on and there he is with a big shadow behind him. He just stares at the audience for an excruciatingly long time. Then he says, "Einstein is dead. Schopenhauer is dead... and I'm not feeling so well myself!"

He was the king of dark humor. He performed as a wacko. Truthfully, he was always depressed in real life and people thought it was his stage character. He was from a rich family in Europe and then his whole family went to concentration camps and lost it all. When he came to the States, he quickly became a huge celebrity in the Village. Then he totally disappeared and became a has been. Dick remembered him and tracked him down. We asked him to perform at the Townhouse and he turned us down saying that his life was over and he couldn't perform anymore. We insisted that he try to perform again in our place. He didn't make it easy for us. He had all these provisions that he tried to use on us to not perform.

He ended up doing the Saturday night midnight show for three years. We revived his career and it helped promote us. We did Equity Showcase Theater for out of work actors to display their talents. We had famous directors trying out their shows. One time an audition for a two-person show brought in 2000 actors vying for the parts. The line went all around the block.

In the 1980s, Theodore made 16 appearances on NBC's Late Night with David Letterman. Letterman introduced him as “a noted philosopher, metaphysician, and podiatrist”. In the early 1980s, he was a regular on the Billy Crystal Comedy Hour. He also did voice work, including the voice-over to the American trailer for Lucio Fulci's The House by the Cemetery in 1981.

In 1989 he appeared in the Joe Dante comedy film The 'Burbs. Up until the late 1990s, he was a guest actor in several episodes of Joe Frank: Work in Progress radio show on National Public Radio (NPR). Beginning in 1982, Theodore took up residence on Saturday nights for a nearly two-decade run at the 13th Street Repertory Theatre in Greenwich Village.

An article on Theodore appeared in RAVE magazine with color photos. Segments from it are in the book Who's Who in Comedy. Just prior to his death from pneumonia, he recorded several monologues for the controversial documentary series Disinfo Nation. He appeared in Billy Crystal's mockumentary Don't Get Me Started. In 1995, he voiced the character of an ointment expert on NPR's Weekend Edition Saturday version of Julius Knipl, Real Estate Photographer.

=== Documentary ===
In early 2001, Theodore and film artist Jeff Sumerel met and discussed producing a documentary about Theodore. In February 2001, preliminary shooting began, including informal interviews with Theodore in his apartment. In April, Theodore contracted pneumonia and died.

Sumerel was encouraged by Theodore's family and friends to complete the documentary. As no funding was available, Sumerel continued the project intermittently as time and financing allowed. After interviewing Henry Gibson other notable performers who were Theodore fans were encouraged to participate. Gibson connected Sumerel with Penn & Teller, who were long-time, avid Theodorians.

Over the next five years, Sumerel interviewed Dick Cavett, Eric Bogosian, Tom Schiller, Harlan Ellison, Len Belzer, Joe Dante, Mark Shulman, and Woody Allen, among others. Sumerel spent the next two years gathering archival materials and working with editor Jeter Rhodes to sift through the vast amount of content conveying Theodore's personal and professional life. The result was a non-traditional documentary titled To My Great Chagrin: The Unbelievable Story of Brother Theodore. The film was selected for premiere, February 13, 2008, at the opening night of the Museum of Modern Art's Fortnight Series.

== Death ==
Theodore died in New York City on April 5, 2001, at the age of 94. He is buried in Mount Pleasant Cemetery in Hawthorne, New York.

His headstone reads: Known as Brother Theodore / Solo Performer, Comedian, Metaphysician / "As Long as There Is Death, There Is Hope"

== In media ==
=== Discography ===
- Entertainment of Sinister and Disconcerting Humor (Tears from a Glass Eye, With a Tongue of Madness): (10 in. disc, Proscenium 21)
- Coral Records Presents Theodore: (Coral S 7322)
- To My Great Chagrin

=== Film appearances ===
- The Stranger (1946)
- So Dark the Night (1946)
- The Lone Wolf in Mexico (1947)
- The Black Widow (serial) (1947)
- The Third Man (1949)
- A Nose (1966) (based on the Nikolai Gogol short story "The Nose")
- Horror of the Blood Monsters (1970) (narration)
- Massage Parlor Murders! (1973)
- Gums (1976)
- Devil's Express (1976)
- The Hobbit (1977) (animated TV movie; voice of Gollum)
- Nocturna: Granddaughter of Dracula (1979)
- The Return of the King (1980) (animated TV movie; voice of Gollum)
- The Last Unicorn (1982) (animated film; voice of Rukh)
- The Invisible Kid (1988)
- That's Adequate (1989)
- The 'Burbs (1989)

==== Note ====
Theodore claimed on one of his David Letterman appearances that he had filmed a scene as a supermarket cashier in Leonard Part 6 starring Bill Cosby, but was fired after a day of shooting because he repeatedly mocked the star.

=== Television appearances ===
- The Tonight Show with Steve Allen: Approximately 05/12/1955
- The Joey Bishop Show: 10/31/1967, 11/8/1967
- The Merv Griffin Show: 1966, 09/26/1969
- The Dick Cavett Show: 07/01/1969
- The Tomorrow Show with Tom Snyder: 10/31/1977
- Billy Crystal: Don't Get Me Started – The Billy Crystal Special: 1986
- Billy Crystal: Don't Get Me Started – The Lost Minutes: 1987
- Late Night with David Letterman (NBC): 9/10/1982, 10/20/1982, 2/3/1983, 5/19/1983, 7/8/1983, 9/7/1983, 2/21/1984, 5/16/1984, 9/17/1984, 12/19/1984, 7/8/1985, 10/31/1985, 9/17/1986, 7/24/1987, 1/13/1988, 2/17/1989 (collected on YouTube)
- Beyond Vaudeville: 8/19/89

=== Radio appearances ===
- "Frequent" appearances on ABC radio's "Offbeat" or "Listen Listen" timeslot, in a "Soloscope" segment of "New Sounds for You" in 1956. Broadcast dates included 16 January and 23 February 1956.
- Joe Frank's radio shows The Decline of Spengler, The End, A Tour of the City, Black Light
- Steve Post The Outside radio show on WBAI in New York during the 1960s and 70s. Broadcast dates include 15 April 1966, 20 November 1967, 22 February 1969, and 20 September 1969.
- Bob Claster's Funny Stuff on KCRW in Santa Monica, September 24, 1989.
- The Ointment Expert: Julius Knipl, Real Estate Photographer, 1996 //www.hearingvoices.com/webwork/isay/knipl.html
