= The Grim Game =

1919 film directed by Irvin Willat

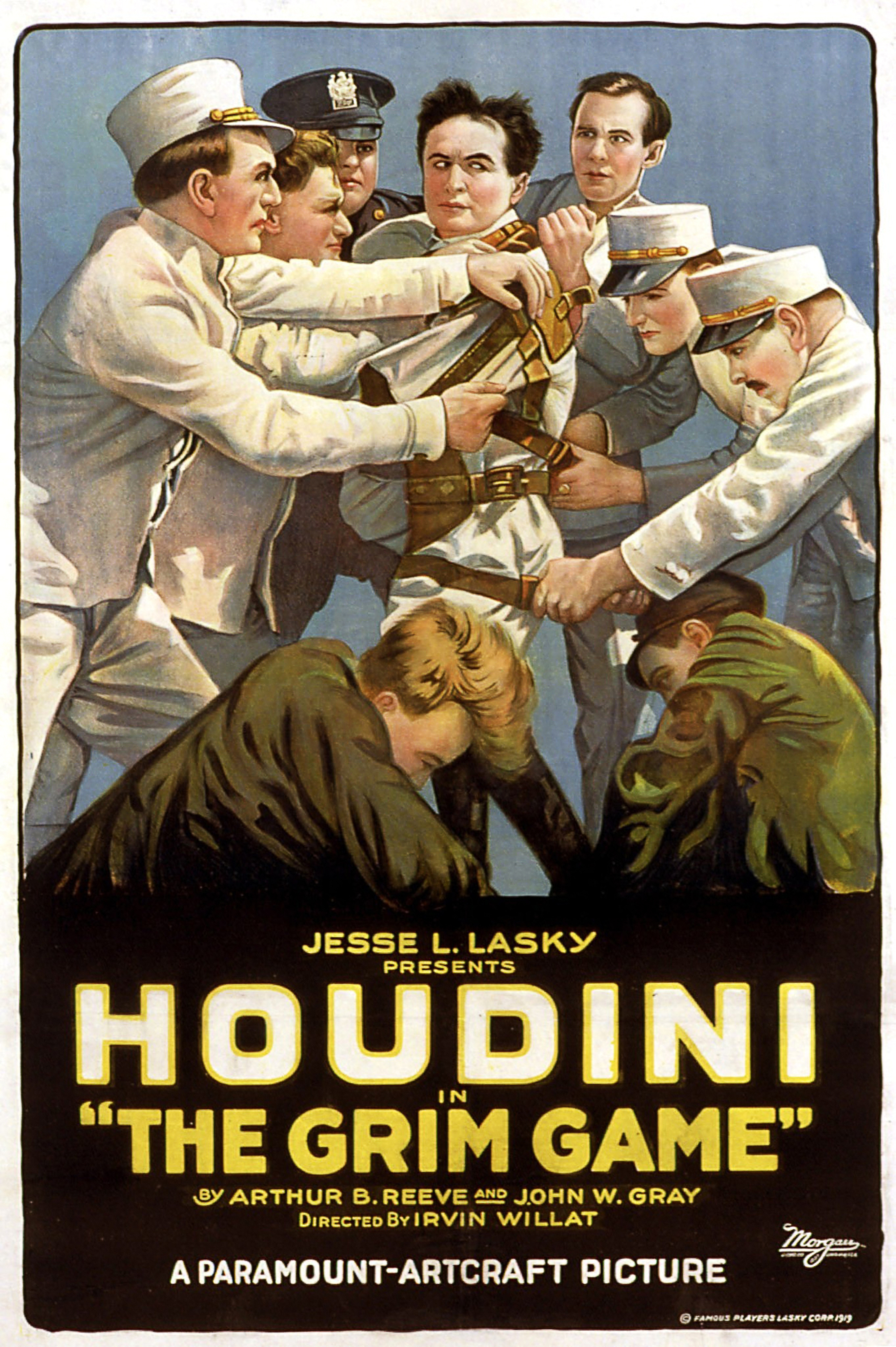
- Theatrical release poster
- Directed by: Irvin Willat
- Screenplay by: Walter Woods
- Story by: Arthur B. Reeve; John Grey
- Produced by: Jesse L. Lasky
- Starring: Harry Houdini; Ann Forrest; Augustus Phillips; Tully Marshall; Arthur Hoyt
- Cinematography: Frank M. Blount
- Production company: Famous Players–Lasky
- Distributed by: Paramount Pictures
- Release date: August 25, 1919
- Running time: 71 minutes
- Country: United States
- Language: Silent (English intertitles)
- Budget: $200,000 ($3,714,000 in 2025)

The Grim Game is a 1919 American silent drama film directed by Irvin Willat and starring Harry Houdini and Ann Forrest. The basic plotline serves as a showcase for Houdini's talent as an escapologist, stunt performer and aviator. As the story unfolds, a series of Houdini's trademark set-piece stunts and escapes are performed. When his tormentors chain him up and imprison him on numerous occasions, Houdini escapes. The film concludes with a climactic mid-air collision following an aircraft pursuit. Following the collision, Houdini is reunited with his fiancée.

== Plot ==
Young newspaper reporter Harvey Hanford is in love with Mary Wentworth, the ward of rich, eccentric Dudley Cameron, who opposes the match. Harvey becomes involved in a newspaper scheme to plant evidence for a fake murder of his uncle.

Dudley Cameron is actually killed, however, and Harvey is framed and arrested for the murder. Jailed unjustly for a murder he did not commit, freeing himself, Harvey is able to pursue the actual killers.

Confronting the gang, Harvey is overwhelmed, but using his amazing powers of escape to free himself in a series of remarkable escapes from handcuffs, chains and a straitjacket, culminating in a climactic mid-air aircraft collision. Following the collision, Harvey is vindicated and finally reunited with Mary.

== Cast ==
- Harry Houdini as Harvey Hanford (credited as Houdini)
- Thomas Jefferson as Dudley Cameron
- Ann Forrest as Mary Wentworth
- Augustus Phillips as Clifton Allison
- Tully Marshall as Richard Raver
- Arthur Hoyt as Dr. Harvey Tyson
- Mae Busch as Ethel Delmead (credited as Mae Bush)
- Edward Martin as Police Reporter
- Jane Wolfe as Hannah (credited as Jane Wolf)

== Production ==
The Grim Game was produced by the Famous Players–Lasky Company, shot at deMille Field Number 2. The aerial sequences were to feature a new stunt, where Houdini would hang by a rope from an aircraft and drop into the cockpit of an aircraft flying below. In the media, Houdini claimed that he was "scorning the use of a stunt man". In actuality, the film company advertised for a stunt double to take Houdini's place. Robert E. Kennedy, a former army air force flight instructor, applied and received a contract for the dangerous stunt.

The mid-air collision in The Grim Game was not scripted. (Note: The mid-air aircraft transfer from one aircraft to another resulted in "what was probably Hollywood's first recorded midair collision.") It was a real accident caught on film over the skies of Santa Monica, California. David E. Thompson was flying with stuntman Robert E. Kennedy, doubling Houdini, hanging from the landing gear. As the two Curtiss JN-4 "Jennys" lined up, a sudden gust of wind pushed Thompson's aircraft into the lower aircraft flown by Christopher Pickup, with his landing gear jamming into the top wing of the lower aircraft. As the two aircraft spun down, Thompson's aircraft flipped upside down while Al Wilson, flying the camera aircraft, followed the tangle of aircraft down.

Both aircraft managed to free themselves at about 200 feet (61 m) and were able to land although Thompson's aircraft was still upside down. No one was killed, and the story was rewritten to incorporate the accident. Publicity was geared heavily toward promoting this dramatic "caught on film" moment, claiming it was Houdini himself dangling from the aircraft.

== Reception ==
The contemporary film review of The Grim Game in The New York Times, noted, "The familiar feats, with which he (Houdini) has entertained audiences for so many years, were more baffling than ever, and airplanes, high-powered motor cars, and heights of treetops were brought into service to give the audience the best possible thrill in stock. For the first time, too, Houdini combines love with his daredevil accomplishments, and throughout the picture his attractive young sweetheart is carried from the secret recesses of a wild hunting lodge, guarded by desperate-looking characters, to perilous heights in the clouds just out of reach of her courageous hero."

Ever the showman, Houdini himself appeared at the Broadway Theatre, New York, for the first screening, proclaiming that he would offer $1,000 to anyone "who could prove that the collision was not an authentic one." He further detailed that the mid-air collision took place at 4,000 ft, a height that allowed both aircraft to recover and land safely.

Aviation film historian James Farmer in Celluloid Wings: The Impact of Movies on Aviation (1984) considered The Grim Game an example of a film that allowed Houdini to "showcase his celebrated stage skills."

== Preservation ==
Widely considered to have been a lost film, a complete print of The Grim Game was acquired by Turner Classic Movies from Larry Weeks, a former juggler from Brooklyn who had obtained his copy from the Houdini estate.

Following up on a lead from Dorothy Dietrich and Dick Brookz of The Houdini Museum in Scranton, Pennsylvania, The Grim Game was restored by Rick Schmidlin. TCM gave the restored version a world premiere as the closing film for their annual Classic Film Festival on March 29, 2015. TCM premiered the film on October 18, 2015.

=== Poster ===
An original 1919 movie poster from The Grim Game was auctioned by eMoviePoster.com for $67,166 on December 3, 2013, a new auction record for any Houdini poster (movie or magic). The poster was purchased by illusionist David Copperfield.

== See also ==
- List of rediscovered films
