= The Hobbit (1977 film) =

1977 animated film directed by Jules Bass and Arthur Rankin, Jr.

- Cover of 1991 USA video release by Warner Home Video
- Genre: Fantasy
- Based on: The Hobbit by J. R. R. Tolkien
- Written by: Romeo Muller
- Directed by: Arthur Rankin Jr.; Jules Bass
- Starring: Orson Bean; Richard Boone; Hans Conried; John Huston; Otto Preminger; Cyril Ritchard; Brother Theodore; Glenn Yarbrough; Paul Frees; Don Messick; John Stephenson; Jack DeLeon
- Theme music composer: Glenn Yarbrough
- Composer: Maury Laws
- Countries of origin: United States; Japan
- Original language: English

Production
- Producers: Jules Bass; Arthur Rankin, Jr.
- Running time: 78 minutes (Note: The film has a running time of 78 minutes; several Internet sites list the full 90 minute air time.)
- Production companies: Rankin/Bass Productions; Topcraft Limited Company
- Budget: $3 million

Original release
- Network: NBC
- Release: November 27, 1977

Related
- The Return of the King

The Hobbit is a 1977 animated musical fantasy television special created by Rankin/Bass and animated by Topcraft. The film is an adaptation of the 1937 book of the same name by J. R. R. Tolkien; it was first broadcast on NBC in the United States on Sunday, November 27, 1977. The teleplay won a Peabody Award; the film received a Christopher Award.

The New York Times found the film "curiously eclectic", but felt that whatever its failings, it warranted attention. The Tolkien scholar Douglas A. Anderson called the adaptation "execrable"; the author Baird Searles called it an "abomination" and an attempt that had "failed miserably", regretting the quality of the animation and of the soundtrack, and the omission of key plot points.

== Plot ==
A hobbit named Bilbo Baggins lives in his hobbit-hole in The Shire. Gandalf, a wizard, suddenly arrives and informs him he is looking for someone to share an adventure, and introduces thirteen dwarves led by Thorin Oakenshield. They invite themselves in, eat dinner, and play music. The magic in the music makes Bilbo suddenly long for adventure.

Thorin explains Bilbo is to be a lucky number fourteen for them, and tells how his dwarves were driven out of the Lonely Mountain by the dragon Smaug, who killed their people and stole their treasure. Gandalf accepts the mission for Bilbo before the hobbit can speak.

The company discovers a camp of three trolls, who capture all but Gandalf and Bilbo. Bilbo hides while Gandalf uses his magic to bring the sunrise, which turns the trolls to stone. In the troll's cave, Bilbo discovers some stolen treasure, which the dwarves claim. They find two swords, and a dagger for Bilbo. Gandalf shows Thorin a map of the Lonely Mountain and a key, given to him by Thorin's father Thrain. The map shows a secret passage.

Travelling through the Misty Mountains, everyone but Gandalf are captured by goblins, who bring them to their leader, The Great Goblin. He tries to kill Thorin, but Gandalf returns, and kills him with his sword (Glamdring, the Foe-Hammer), allowing the dwarves to escape. Bilbo loses the group; he finds an underground lake, where he discovers a ring, and meets the creature Gollum. Gollum forces Bilbo to engage in a series of riddles; if Bilbo wins, Gollum will show him the way out, but if Gollum wins, he gets to eat Bilbo. Discovering the ring grants invisibility, Bilbo follows Gollum to the door, and escapes.

The goblins, riding Wargs, pursue the company into a pine forest, setting it ablaze. The Lord of the Eagles rescues the company, and carries them to Mirkwood Forest; Gandalf must leave, as he has pressing business elsewhere. In Mirkwood, Bilbo and the dwarves are captured by giant spiders, but Bilbo puts on his ring and drives off the spiders with his dagger, which he then names "Sting". The dwarves are apprehended by the wood elves. Bilbo evades them using his ring. After weeks of searching, Bilbo pilfers a sleeping guard's keys, and floats the dwarves in barrels down the river into Laketown.

The people of Laketown nurse the company back to health. The fourteen reach the Lonely Mountain, and follow the map's instructions to enter. Bilbo goes in first, and meets Smaug, using the ring to hide. He and Smaug converse; the dragon assumes Bilbo must be a Laketowner. Bilbo discovers a patch of skin on Smaug not covered by protective scales. When Smaug attacks him for stealing, he escapes, mocking the dragon. Enraged, Smaug flies off to take revenge on Laketown. Bilbo sends a thrush to tell Bard about the bare patch in Smaug's armor. As the dragon attacks Laketown, the thrush arrives and tells Bard about Smaug's weakness. Bard stands his ground and shoots Smaug down with his family's black arrow, but Smaug destroys Laketown in his death throes.

The Dwarves reclaim their treasure, only to find that the Lakemen, led by Bard who has been named king by his people, and the Elves have arrived, wanting recompense for Smaug's many damages over the years. Thorin refuses to share, and declares war. Bilbo rebukes him, as they are outnumbered, angering Thorin. Just as the Lakemen and Elves are about to attack, Thorin's cousin, Dain, arrives with a dwarven army. Gandalf reappears, warning that the Goblins are coming. Men, elves, and dwarves unite against the common enemy, and Bilbo uses his ring to hide as battle rages. Just when all looks lost, the Eagles join the fight.

Bilbo finds a wounded Bombur who informs him that the Battle of Five Armies has been won. Only seven of the thirteen dwarves are left. Bilbo is led by Gandalf to the dying Thorin, who forgives him. Bilbo accepts two small chests of gold and his dagger as payment. Gandalf escorts him home. Gandalf warns him that the adventure is only just beginning, thanks to the ring he has found.

== Voice cast ==
The voice actors for the characters were:

- Orson Bean – Bilbo Baggins
- Richard Boone – Smaug the Dragon
- Hans Conried – Thorin Oakenshield
- John Huston – Gandalf / Narrator
- Otto Preminger – The Elvenking
- Cyril Ritchard – Elrond
- Brother Theodore – Gollum
- Paul Frees – Bombur, Troll #1
- Jack DeLeon – Dwalin, Fíli, Kíli, Óin, Glóin, Ori, Nori, Bifur, Bofur, Troll #2
- Don Messick – Balin, Goblin, Lord of the Eagles, Troll #3
- John Stephenson – Dori, Bard, Great Goblin
- Glenn Yarbrough – the balladeer
- Thurl Ravenscroft – Goblin (singing voice), background voice

== Production ==
The film was produced and directed by Arthur Rankin Jr. and Jules Bass of Rankin/Bass Productions in New York City. It was adapted for the screen by Romeo Muller; Rankin took on the additional duties of production designer. When interviewed for the film, Rankin declared that he would add nothing to the story that was not in the original. The New York Times reported that The Hobbit cost $3 million to produce. In a 2003 interview, Rankin stated, "I love the Tolkien work". He explained that he was able to make the film because The Hobbit was still in the public domain at the time, despite claims to the contrary from the copyright holders.

The story's protagonist, Bilbo Baggins, is voiced by Orson Bean, backed up by Hollywood director and actor John Huston as the voice of Gandalf. In supporting roles, the comedian and performance artist Brother Theodore voiced Gollum, and Thurl Ravenscroft performed the baritone singing voices of the goblins. The gravelly voice of the dragon Smaug was provided by Richard Boone, with Hans Conried as Thorin Oakenshield.

The Hobbit was animated by Topcraft in Tokyo, a now-defunct Japanese animation studio whose animation team re-formed as Studio Ghibli under Hayao Miyazaki; some of the animators went on to establish Pacific Animation Corporation. According to Rankin, the visual style of the film took its cue from the early illustrations of Arthur Rackham.

While Topcraft produced the animation overseas, the concept artwork was completed at the Rankin/Bass studio under Rankin's direction. Rhode Island artist Lester Abrams did the initial designs for most of the characters; Rankin had seen Abrams' illustrations to an excerpt from The Hobbit in Children's Digest.

Harry N. Abrams published a large, illustrated coffee table edition of the book featuring concept art and stills. Jules Bass adapted Tolkien's original lyrics for the film's musical interludes, drawn primarily from the songs in the book. He assisted Maury Laws, Rankin/Bass's composer and conductor-in-residence in the composition of an original theme song, "The Greatest Adventure (The Ballad of the Hobbit)", sung by Glenn Yarbrough. It was the film's sole original song, and came to be heavily associated with Yarbrough.

== Critical reception ==
In 1978, Romeo Muller won a Peabody Award for his teleplay for The Hobbit. The film won a Christopher Award. It was nominated for the Hugo Award for Best Dramatic Presentation, but lost to Star Wars.

A few days before its first airing, John J. O'Connor wrote in The New York Times that "Rankin and Bass Productions have now carefully translated The Hobbit into film. The result is curiously eclectic, but filled with nicely effective moments... The drawings frequently suggest strong resemblances to non-Tolkien characters... The goblins could have stepped out of a Maurice Sendak book. But... the Dragon and Gollum the riddle aficionado bring some clever original touches... Whatever its flaws, this television version of The Hobbit warrants attention."

Criticism primarily focused on adaptation issues, including the unfamiliar style of artwork used by the Japanese-American co-production team. Some Tolkien fans questioned the appropriateness of repackaging the material as a family film for a very young audience. The scholar Douglas A. Anderson called the adaptation "execrable" in the introduction to his book The Annotated Hobbit, although he did not elaborate; and a few critics said it was confusing for those not already familiar with the plot. The science fiction author Baird Searles criticized the adaptation, calling it an "abomination" and an attempt that had "failed miserably". He singled out the quality of animation, the omission of key plot points such as Beorn and the Arkenstone, and the soundtrack.

IGN gave the film 7 out of 10, recommending it to fans of the novel. On the review aggregator website Rotten Tomatoes, 71% of 17 critics' reviews are positive, with an average rating of 5.70/10.

== Release ==
Before The Hobbit aired on NBC, Rankin/Bass and its partner animation houses began preparing a sequel. Meanwhile, United Artists released J.R.R. Tolkien's The Lord of the Rings in 1978, an animated adaptation directed by Ralph Bakshi, originally intended as the first part in a two-part film. United Artists's sequel would soon be cancelled after a disagreement with Bakshi. The Hobbit first aired as an animated television special in 1977.

Disney's Buena Vista Records released The Hobbit on LP with the soundtrack and dialogue from the film in 1977. An edited version, along with accompanying "storyteller read-alongs", was later issued by sister label Disneyland Records.

The Hobbit was released in the early 1980s on Betamax and VHS by Sony Video Software and on CED by RCA, under license from ABC Video Enterprises. Warner Home Video released the film on VHS in 1991 and again in 1996 (as part of the Warner Bros. Classic Tales VHS line), and on DVD in 2001 (under Warner Bros. Family Entertainment label), though on the DVD, some of the sound effects were absent. (Note: E.g. goblets clanking and hammer-tinkering noises omitted, spider death screams, along with several lines of dialogue.) Parade Video released the film on DVD and VHS in 2004.

The film was released on DVD by Warner Bros. as part of a DVD trilogy boxed set, which includes Ralph Bakshi's The Lord of the Rings and the Rankin/Bass production of The Return of the King. A remastered deluxe edition DVD was released in 2014.

== See also ==
- The Hobbit film series (live action)
- The Last Unicorn (film)
- List of animated feature films
- The Hobbit (1967 film) a short film by Gene Deitch
- The Hobbit (1985 film) a USSR film
