= Modern Magic =

1876 treatise by Professor Hoffmann

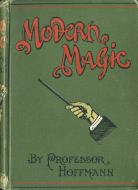
- Author: Professor Hoffmann
- Published: 1876

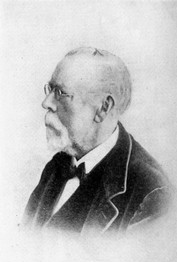
Professor Hoffmann

Modern Magic by Professor Hoffmann (real name Angelo Lewis) is a treatise in book form, first published in 1876, detailing the apparatus, methods and tricks used by the stage magicians and conjurors of that era. Hoffmann was considered to be one of the greatest authorities on the theory and practice of magic, despite his own limited professional experience as a magician.

== The Modern Magic book series ==
Professor Hoffman imparted much of his wisdom and expertise in the art of magic through a series of four books:

- Modern Magic (48 articles, first serialized in Routledge's Every Boy's Paper, and then published as one volume, in 1876.)
- More Magic (1890)
- Later Magic (1903)
- Latest Magic (1918)

Of the series, Modern Magic is best known. The book contains advice on the appearance, the dress and the staging of a magician. It then goes on to describe many tricks with playing cards, coins, watches, rings, handkerchiefs, dominoes, dice, cups and balls, balls, and hats, and concludes with a long chapter of miscellaneous tricks, including magic with strings, gloves, eggs, rice and some utility devices. The penultimate chapter describes large stage illusions, and the final chapter contains advice on routining a magic show, and more advice on staging.

The first edition of Modern Magic "sold out within weeks and subsequent printings continued to fly off the shelves." Its popularity was due in part to the scarcity of teaching materials available to would-be magicians in the late 19th century. Modern Magic was the first book in the English language to really explain how to perform magical feats. The publication of Modern Magic was controversial, however, as some magicians were outraged that their secrets were now published. On the other hand, it appears that Hoffmann only published secrets with their creators' permission.

Modern Magic, and Hoffmann's writings in general, influenced several well-known magicians including Howard Thurston, Chung Ling Soo, Alexander, and Harry Houdini. David Copperfield's private museum is home to Hoffmann's personal copy of Modern Magic. Copperfield believes that "the book eventually played an essential role in elevating the art of conjuring and may have acted as a catalyst for the entire golden age of magic".

== See also ==
- Timeline of magic
