= Lou Lancaster =

American magician

- Lou Lancaster, Magician
- Born: Louis Lancaster McClung; October 31, 1936
- Died: July 5, 2008 (aged 71)
- Other names: Chan Lu "The Charlie Chan Of Magic"
- Occupation: Magician
- Website: www.loulancaster.com

Lou Lancaster (October 31, 1936 – July 5, 2008), born Louis Lancaster McClung, was an American magician and author.

His 1984 book Tricks Of The Trade: A Professional Looks at Commercial Closeup Magic OCLC 12995877 [edited by Phyllis Guggenheim; photos by Lancaster & Guggenheim] explained many techniques of close-up magic, and he appeared in several instructional videos produced by the International Magicians Society. The August 2005 issue of The Linking Ring featured a cover story on Lancaster and his innovations.

Lancaster performed at the Magic Castle eighteen times, with multiple engagements throughout Las Vegas, Lake Tahoe, San Francisco, Sacramento, and the Catskills. When in New York he worked at the famous Magic Towne House headed up by Dorothy Dietrich and Dick Brooks. He helped assemble Dietrich's straitjacket escape for the HBO Special The World's Greatest Escapes, in which she appeared as special guest star. She holds the record for the highest stationary escape by a woman from a straitjacket while hanging from a burning rope. She has been quoted as saying, "I trusted my life to Lou Lancaster!" She also says he invented the famous Twister illusion for Mark Wilson when he worked on his TV show. He was the resident magician at Magic Island in Newport for two years.

After Lancaster's death, Jeff McBride - who credits Lancaster with giving him his first professional engagement - participated in Lancaster's memorial Broken Wand Ceremony.
