= The Return of the King (1980 film) =

1980 animated musical television film by Jules Bass

- Original VHS release cover
- Based on: The Hobbit and The Return of the King by J. R. R. Tolkien
- Written by: Romeo Muller
- Directed by: Jules Bass; Arthur Rankin Jr.
- Starring: Orson Bean; Theodore Bikel; William Conrad; John Huston; Roddy McDowall; Brother Theodore; Paul Frees; Glenn Yarbrough
- Theme music composer: Glenn Yarbrough
- Composer: Maury Laws
- Countries of origin: United States; Japan
- Original language: English

Production
- Producers: Arthur Rankin Jr.; Jules Bass
- Running time: 98 minutes
- Production companies: Rankin/Bass Productions; Topcraft Limited Company

Original release
- Network: ABC
- Release: May 11, 1980

Related
- The Hobbit

The Return of the King (also known as The Return of the King: A Story of the Hobbits) is a 1980 animated musical fantasy television film. It is a sequel to The Hobbit (1977). The film is an adaptation of The Return of the King, the third and final volume of the 1955 novel The Lord of the Rings by J. R. R. Tolkien. The first two parts of Tolkien's story, The Fellowship of the Ring and The Two Towers, are not covered in this release and are only briefly summarized at the beginning of the movie.

The special aired on ABC on Sunday, May 11, 1980. Both critics and fans gave The Return of the King an indifferent reception.

== Plot ==
Gandalf briefly narrates the background. Then, at Bilbo Baggins's 129th birthday party in Rivendell, his nephew Frodo explains why he is missing a finger from his hand while the Minstrel of Gondor sings a ballad that tells the story of the quest to destroy the One Ring and defeat the Dark Lord Sauron.

In Mordor, Frodo's friend and companion, Samwise Gamgee, bears the Ring in Frodo's absence as he ventures to rescue Frodo from the Orc fortress of Cirith Ungol. During his journey, Sam is tempted to claim the Ring for himself, but ultimately resists its power. He rescues Frodo, and the two Hobbits head out for Mount Doom to destroy the Ring.

Meanwhile, the wizard Gandalf the White and the Hobbit Pippin Took arrive at Minas Tirith to warn Denethor, the Steward of Gondor, about the upcoming war—only to discover that the Steward has gone insane and means to take his own life. Frodo and Samwise continue toward Mount Doom (eluding Ringwraiths and infiltrating a battalion of Orcs in the process) only to be attacked by Gollum, the creature from whom Bilbo took the Ring decades before. Frodo casts Gollum down, however, and goes to the Crack of Doom. Sam prepares to kill Gollum, but is overcome with pity and allows him to flee.

At the same time, Gondor's neighbouring country, Rohan, battles Sauron's forces in the Battle of Pelennor Fields, but its King, Théoden, is killed by the Witch-king of Angmar. Theoden's niece Éowyn, who had disguised herself as a man to take part in the battle, kills the Witch-king with help from the Hobbit Merry Brandybuck, temporarily defeating Sauron's armies. Those forces momentarily rally upon the arrival of the black fleet coming from the west, the despairing vision of which drove Denethor to his suicide, but their morale shatters when they realise the fleet is under the command of Prince Aragorn of Gondor. Upon his own arrival, Aragorn, heir to the throne of Gondor, plans to confront Sauron at the Black Gate. Here, he quarrels with the Mouth of Sauron and the two armies prepare for battle.

On Mount Doom, Frodo succumbs to the Ring's power and puts it on, becoming invisible. Sam discovers Gollum and Frodo fighting over the Ring, which results in Gollum's biting off Frodo's finger to claim it. While dancing with joy at the retrieval of his "precious", Gollum falls into the lava of Mount Doom, taking the Ring with him. The Ring is destroyed, and Sauron perishes. Sam and Frodo are rescued by the Eagles from the erupting Mount Doom. A few months later, Aragorn is crowned King of Gondor.

The story concludes with Frodo accompanying Bilbo, Gandalf, and Elrond as they leave Middle-earth. He gives the Red Book of Westmarch (consisting of Bilbo's memoirs with some spare pages) to Sam, assuring him that a good life is still in store for him. Gandalf assures them that Hobbits will someday have descendants among humans, to preserve their own existence; and the film ends with Frodo's departure from the Grey Havens.

== Cast ==
The voice cast is:

- Orson Bean – Bilbo Baggins, Frodo Baggins
- Nellie Bellflower – Éowyn
- Theodore Bikel – Aragorn
- William Conrad – Denethor
- Paul Frees – Elrond, Orc, Uruk-hai
- John Huston – Gandalf
- Casey Kasem – Merry Brandybuck
- Roddy McDowall – Samwise Gamgee
- Sonny Melendrez – Pippin Took
- Don Messick – The Mouth of Sauron, Théoden, Easterling
- John Stephenson – Lord of the Nazgul, Gondorian Guard
- Brother Theodore – Gollum (credited as Theodore)
- Glenn Yarbrough – The Minstrel

== Production ==
After the 1977 broadcast of The Hobbit on NBC, development and production began on The Return of the King at Rankin/Bass Productions in New York City under supervision of Arthur Rankin Jr. and Jules Bass. The film's original working title was Frodo, The Hobbit II. It was written by Romeo Muller with Rankin doing the script, designs for the characters and storyboards. The original cast from the previous film returned to reprise the voices of the characters with new actors joining them.

Orson Bean returned as the voice of the older Bilbo Baggins, as well as that of the story's hero, Frodo Baggins. John Huston also came back, as the wizard Gandalf, and co-starring with them were: William Conrad as Denethor, Roddy McDowall as Samwise Gamgee, Theodore Bikel as Aragorn, and reprising his role of Gollum, Brother Theodore. Rankin/Bass stalwart Paul Frees replaced the late Cyril Ritchard as the voice of Elrond; Casey Kasem was Merry Brandybuck, with Sonny Melendrez as Pippin Took; Nellie Bellflower as Éowyn; and Glenn Yarbrough returned as principal vocalist, billed here as simply "the Minstrel of Gondor". Thurl Ravenscroft served in the chorus. Once the character voices were recorded, in addition to background music by Maury Laws, with Jules Bass writing songs and lyrics for the film, the animation production was done by Topcraft in Japan under supervision of Toru Hara, Tsuguyuki Kubo, Kazuyuki Kobayashi and others.

The release was threatened by a lawsuit filed by the Tolkien Estate and Fantasy Films on the basis that Rankin/Bass had not secured the U.S. and Canadian television rights to J. R. R. Tolkien's book. The lawsuit was settled "amicably", allowing it to proceed with a May 1980 release.

The film is often mistaken for a sequel to Ralph Bakshi's 1978 animated film The Lord of the Rings. After Rankin/Bass became defunct in 1987, Warner Bros. acquired the rights to the special for home video distribution and chose to market the film, in addition with The Hobbit, as installments of an animated Tolkien trilogy, with Bakshi's The Lord of the Rings (by then also owned by Warner Bros., from United Artists) acting as the middle chapter. This false promotion led to rumours that Rankin/Bass had originally decided to produce The Return of the King upon hearing Bakshi's sequel to The Lord of the Rings had been cancelled. However, Rankin/Bass had always planned on making The Return of the King as a follow-up to their production of The Hobbit, even before the release of Bakshi's film.

== Reception ==
The film has garnered mixed reviews from modern sources. Charles Cassidy of Common Sense Media gave it a score of 3/5, and said, "Cartoon tale is darker, more complex than others in series". Steven D. Greydanus of Decent Films Guide gave it a C, and said, "Works even less well than The Hobbit, which really is a children's story… overbearing folk-ballad soundtrack doesn't even gesture lyrically to Tolkien's poetry". On the review aggregator website Rotten Tomatoes, 67% of 15 critics' reviews are positive, with an average rating of 5.90/10.

Director Arthur Rankin Jr. later stated, "We tried to do Return of the King... but it is an awful lot to put into it. I think [Peter] Jackson is having the same problem in his films. You can't deviate from these books, or somebody'll wait on the street for you! ...[In] The Return of the King, we had to summarize what had happened before, and then put it all together in 2 hours. It's not a very good film." Asked why he chose only to make The Return of the King, instead of making the entire Lord of the Rings trilogy, Rankin admitted, "I didn't know that the audience would sit still for it. I was wrong."

== Home media ==
The Return of the King was first released on CED videodisc by RCA in 1979 and later on VHS by Warner Home Video in 1991, and for the second time as part of the Warner Bros. Classic Tales video collection in 1996. The film has been available on DVD since 2001, both individually and as a "boxed trilogy" with Rankin/Bass's The Hobbit and Bakshi's The Lord of the Rings.
