= Magic Towne House =

Coordinates: 40.76270°N 73.96606°W

- Interactive map of Magic Towne House
- Location: 1026 Third Avenue, New York City, New York, USA
- Operating season: Closed

Attractions
- Total: 0 None
- Website: http://MagicTowneHouse.com

The Magic Towne House was a magic show spot on three floors at 1026 Third Avenue, north of 60th Street, New York City, in the 1970s and 1980s. It was a venue for adults in the cabaret as well as having a children's theater for patrons of all ages to see and enjoy magic.

== Importance ==
The Magic Towne House became a popular magic show spot in New York City, with the longest continuously running magic shows in New York City's history. For fifteen years it showcased both new and established magicians to the general public. It was in the posh area of the Upper East Side of Manhattan on Third Avenue and 61st Street next to Bloomingdale's Department Store.

== Operation ==
It was headed up by magicians Dorothy Dietrich and Dick Brooks.

According to William Dorfliinger's book The Magic Catalogue:

The Mystical Magic Towne House featured New York's cleverest close-up magicians, arranged gala children's birthday parties, and a modern magic shop. It is the brainchild of two young magicians Ray Carter (AKA Dick Brooks and John Bravo) and Dorothy Dietrich who operate it and sometimes appear on its programs... Dorothy Dietrich, who hails from Erie, Pennsylvania, is one of the East's most active lady magicians. She does general magic, dove productions, even straitjacket escapes. Her partner, Ray Carter (AKA John Bravo and Dick Brooks) performs a wide range of magic effects also, and is well known for his demonstrations of ESP and mind reading. The Towne House is a discovery for magic lovers and the parents of magic lovers"

Dick Brooks and Dorothy Dietrich were "involved in the management and direction of all its activities.

== Incubator for young magicians ==
One of the goals of the establishment was to develop future generations of magicians. Originally opened by Eddie Davis, it was taken over by two professional performers, Dick Brooks (entertainer) and Dorothy Dietrich. They encouraged new and unknown performers by allowing them to perform after the main acts had gone on. Some of the magicians who got their early start at The Magic Towne House include Robert Baxt, Jeff McBride, Otto and George, Johnny Ace Palmer and Rocco Silano.

== Venue for established magicians ==
Established performers of the era also performed there such as Harry Blackstone, Jr., Milbourne Christopher, Daryl, Fantasio , Frank Garcia, Walter B. Gibson, Lou Lancaster, Max Maven, James Randi, David Roth, Darwin Ortiz, George Schindler and Slydini.

== Legacy ==
Opening a magic show venue in New York City had been a dream of many famous magicians, such as Houdini, Thurston and Doug Henning. This was finally accomplished with the efforts of Eddie Davis, Dorothy Dietrich and Dick Brooks (entertainer) and the help of many who worked this venue. Dick Brooks also searched out Brother Theodore, whose career had waned, to do several seasons of midnight shows, and helped to bring him back to prominence. After that Theodore appeared on The Tom Snyder Tomorrow Show and a long series of TV and movie appearances. Magic Towne House advertisements appeared in local New York newspapers such as The Village Voice and the New York Post.

After the closing of the Magic Towne House, Michael Chaut and Peter Samelson went on to develop "Monday Night Magic" along with Frank Brents, Todd Robbins, and Jamy Ian Swiss, which still runs successfully in New York City.

== See also ==
- List of magic museums
