= Gollum =

Monster in Tolkien's fantasy series

- Middle-earth character
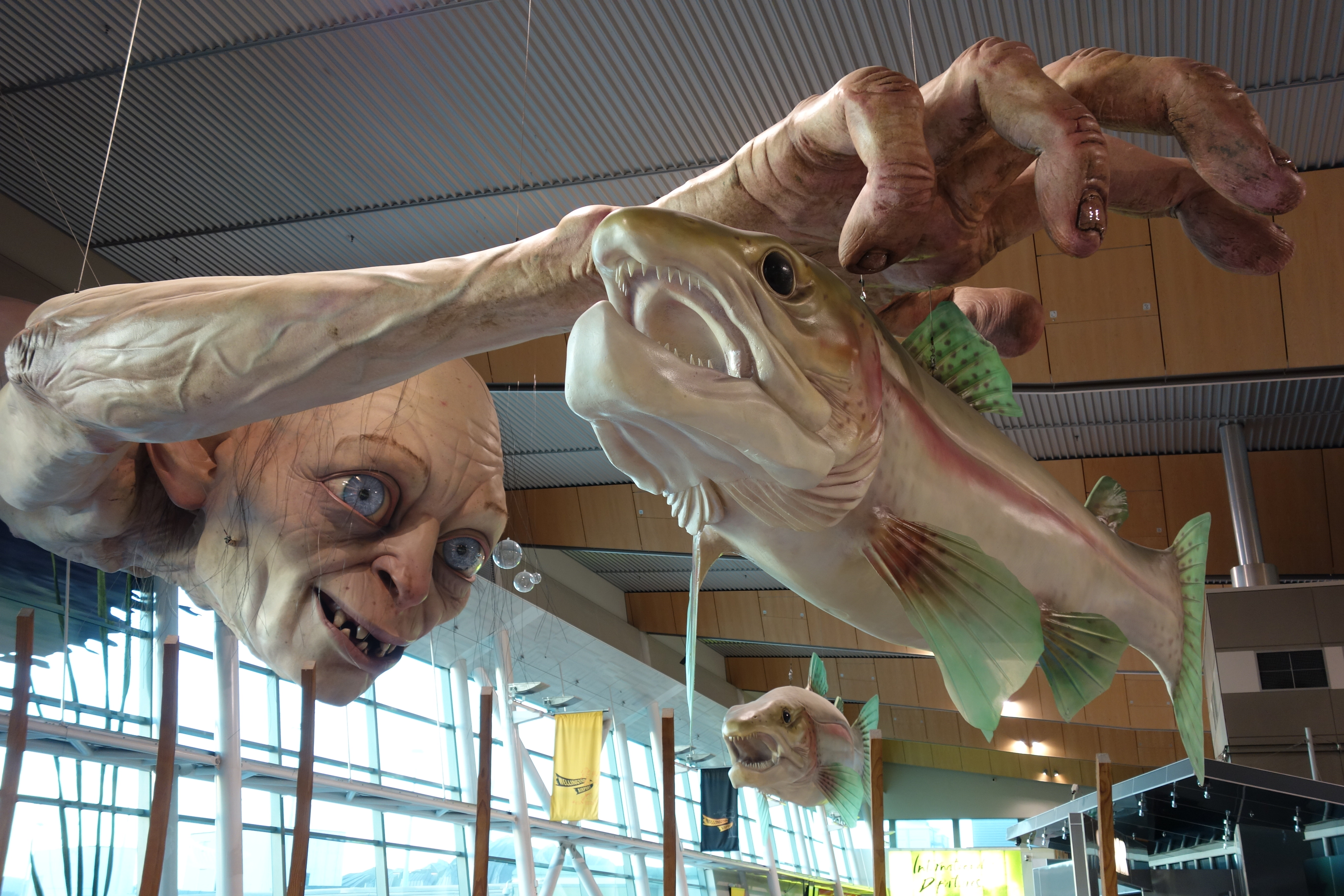
- Sculpture of Gollum catching fish at Wellington Airport, New Zealand, 2013, to mark the release of The Hobbit: An Unexpected Journey

In-universe information
- Full name: Sméagol
- Race: Hobbit (Stoor branch)
- Gender: Male
- Book(s): The Hobbit (1937); The Lord of the Rings (1954–1955); Unfinished Tales (1980)

Gollum is a fictional character in J. R. R. Tolkien's fantasy world of Middle-earth. He was introduced in the 1937 fantasy novel The Hobbit, and became a major character in its sequel, The Lord of the Rings. Gollum was a Stoor Hobbit (Note: Tolkien 1980, Part Three, IV. "The Hunt for the Ring", p 353, note 9) (Note: Carpenter 2023, #214 to A. C. Nunn, c. late 1958-early 1959 "remigration of the Stoors ... Deagol-Smeagol incident") of the River-folk who lived near the Gladden Fields. In The Lord of the Rings, it is stated that he was originally known as Sméagol before he was corrupted by the One Ring, and later named Gollum after his habit of making "a horrible swallowing noise in his throat". (Note: Tolkien 1937, ch. 5 "Riddles in the Dark")

Sméagol obtained the Ring by murdering his cousin Déagol, who found it in the River Anduin. Gollum calls the Ring "my precious", and it extended his life far beyond natural limits. Centuries of the Ring's influence have twisted Gollum's body and mind, and, by the time of the novels, he "loved and hated [the Ring], as he loved and hated himself." (Note: Tolkien 1954a, book 1, ch. 2 "The Shadow of the Past") Throughout the story, Gollum is torn between his lust for the Ring and his desire to be free of it. In The Hobbit, Bilbo Baggins finds the One Ring and takes it for his own, and Gollum afterwards pursues it for the rest of his life. In The Return of the King, Gollum finally seizes the Ring from Frodo Baggins at the Crack of Doom in Mount Doom in Mordor, but he falls into the fires of the volcano, where both he and the Ring are destroyed.

Commentators have treated Gollum as a monster: the Tolkien scholar Verlyn Flieger suggests that Gollum is Tolkien's central monster-figure. Others have described Gollum as a psychological shadow figure for Frodo, and as an evil guide in contrast to the wizard Gandalf, the good guide. They have noted, too, that Gollum is not wholly evil, and has a part to play in the will of Eru Iluvatar, the God figure of Middle-earth, necessary to the destruction of the Ring. For Gollum's literary origins, scholars have compared Gollum to the shrivelled hag Gagool in Rider Haggard's 1885 novel King Solomon's Mines and to the subterranean Morlocks in H. G. Wells's 1895 novel The Time Machine.

Gollum was voiced by Brother Theodore in Rankin-Bass's animated adaptations of The Hobbit and Return of the King, and by Peter Woodthorpe in Ralph Bakshi's animated film version and the BBC's 1981 radio adaptation of The Lord of the Rings. He was portrayed through motion capture by Andy Serkis in Peter Jackson's The Lord of the Rings film trilogy and The Hobbit: An Unexpected Journey. The "Gollum and Sméagol" scene in The Two Towers directly represents Gollum's split personality as a pair of entities. This has been called "perhaps the most celebrated scene in the entire film".

== Name ==
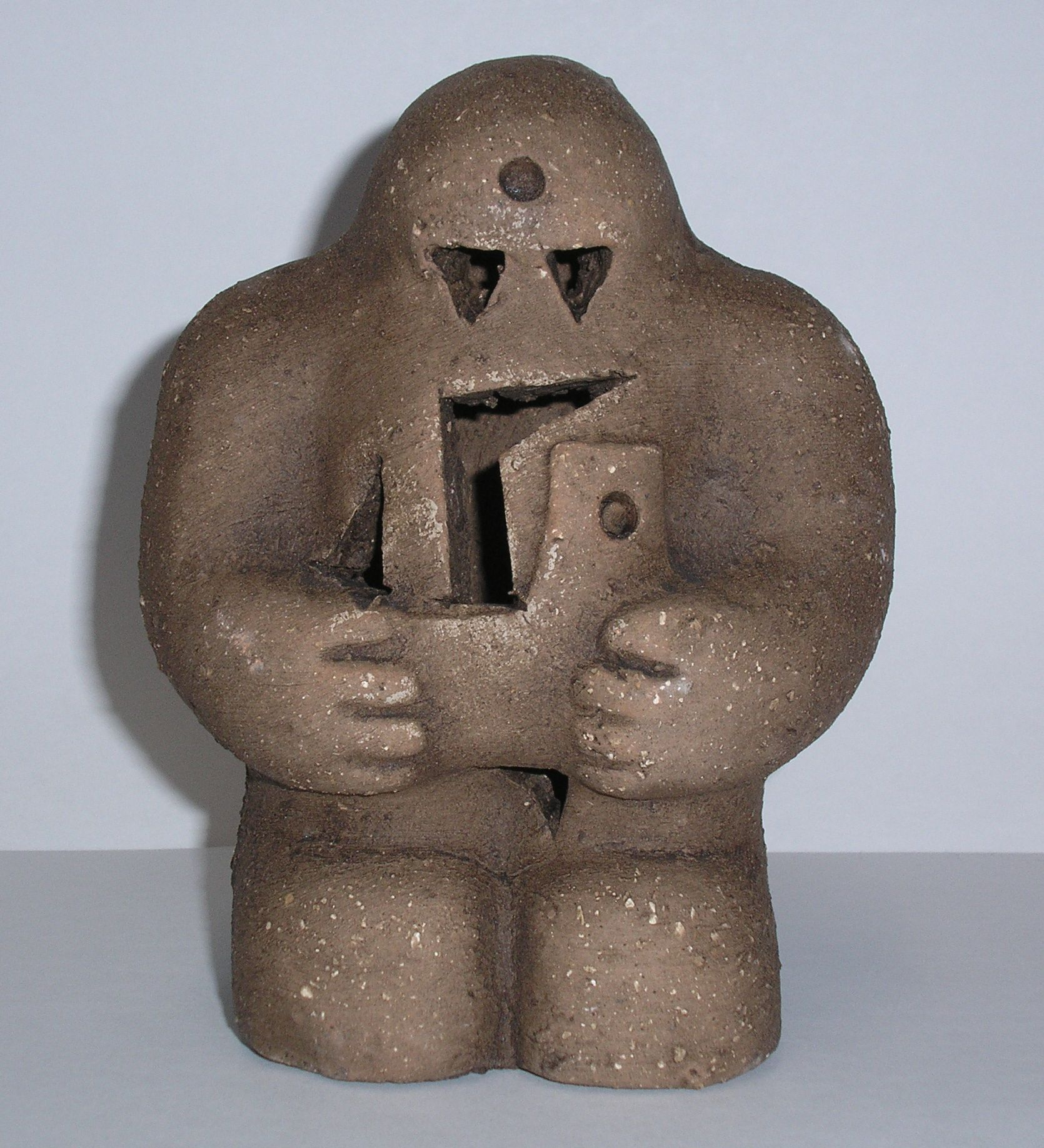
One suggestion is that Gollum derives from golem, the name of a being in Jewish folklore (Prague golem pictured).

The Tolkien scholar Douglas A. Anderson, editor of The Annotated Hobbit, suggests that Tolkien derived the name Gollum from the Old Norse word gull or goll, meaning "gold, treasure, something precious"; this has the dative form gollum. Another suggestion is that it derives from golem, the name of a being in Jewish folklore.

In Appendix F of The Lord of the Rings, Tolkien pretends that the name Sméagol is a "translation" of the Middle-earth name Trahald. (Note: Tolkien 1955, Appendix F) The latter means "burrowing, worming in", and is hence rendered by a name based on the Old English verb smēagan, meaning "to scrutinize, investigate".

The rhyming name of his relative Déagol is from Old English dēagol, meaning "secretive, hidden". As with Sméagol, this is supposed to be a translation of an original Middle-earth name (in this case, Nahald).

== Appearances ==
=== The Hobbit ===
Gollum is introduced in The Hobbit as "a small, slimy creature" who lives on a small island in an underground lake at the roots of the Misty Mountains. He survives on cavefish, which he catches from a small boat, and small goblins who stray too far from the stronghold of the Great Goblin. Over the years, his eyes have adapted to the dark and become "lamp-like", shining with a sickly pale light.

Bilbo Baggins stumbles upon Gollum's lair, having found the Ring in the network of goblin tunnels leading down to the lake. At his wits' end in the dark, Bilbo agrees to a riddle game with Gollum on the chance of being shown the way out of the mountains. In the first edition of The Hobbit, Gollum's size is not stated. Originally, he was also characterised as being less bound to the Ring than in later versions; he offers to give the Ring to Bilbo if he loses the riddle game, and he shows Bilbo the way out of the mountains after losing himself. To fit the concept of the ruling Ring that emerged during the writing of The Lord of the Rings, Tolkien revised later editions of The Hobbit. The version of the story given in the first edition became the lie that Bilbo made up to justify his possession of the Ring to the Dwarves and Gandalf.

In the new version, Gollum pretends that he will show Bilbo the way out if he loses the riddle-game, but he actually plans to use the Ring to kill and eat him. Discovering the Ring missing, he suddenly realises the answer to Bilbo's last riddle – "What have I got in my pocket?" – and flies into a rage. Bilbo inadvertently discovers the Ring's power of invisibility as he flees, allowing him to follow Gollum undetected to a back entrance of the caves. Gollum is convinced that Bilbo knew the way out all along, and hopes to intercept him near the entrance, lest the goblins apprehend Bilbo and find the Ring. Bilbo at first thinks to kill Gollum in order to escape, but is overcome with pity, and so merely leaps over him. As Bilbo escapes, Gollum vows eternal hatred of him and the Baggins family name.

=== The Lord of the Rings ===
The chapter "The Shadow of the Past" in Tolkien's sequel novel The Lord of the Rings supplies Gollum with a backstory, which Gandalf relates to Frodo Baggins, Bilbo's cousin and heir.

Gollum's real name was Sméagol, and he had once been a member of the secluded branch of the early Stoorish Hobbits. He spent the early years of his life with his extended family under a matriarch, his grandmother. On Sméagol's birthday, he and his relative Déagol went fishing in the Gladden Fields. There, Déagol found the Ring in the riverbed after being pulled into the water by a fish. Sméagol fell immediately under the Ring's influence and demanded it as a birthday present; when Déagol refused, Sméagol fatally strangled him, taking the ring.

Sméagol later used the Ring for thieving, spying and antagonising his friends and relatives, who nicknamed him "Gollum" for the swallowing noise he made in his throat, until his grandmother disowned him. He wandered in the wilderness for a few years until he finally retreated to a deep cavern in the Misty Mountains. The Ring's malignant influence twisted his body and mind, and prolonged his life well beyond its natural limits.

Gollum left his cave in pursuit of Bilbo a few years after losing the Ring, but the trail was cold. However, he travelled to Mordor, where he met the monstrous spider Shelob and became her spy, worshipping her and bringing her food. He was eventually captured by Sauron's forces and tortured, revealing to Sauron the names of "Baggins" and "the Shire". His testimony alerted Sauron to the existence and significance of hobbits in general and the Baggins family in particular. He was freed, but was soon caught by Aragorn and placed in the care of the Wood Elves of Mirkwood. Gandalf interrogated him about the Ring. He escaped from them (with the help of Sauron's Orcs) and descended into Moria.

Gollum begins following the Fellowship of the Ring in Moria, but is noticed by Frodo, Gandalf, and Aragorn. He trails the Fellowship to the edge of Lothlórien. He picks up their trail again as they leave, (Note: Tolkien 1954a, book 2, ch. 9 "The Great River") following them all the way to Rauros, then pursues Frodo and Samwise Gamgee across the Emyn Muil when they strike out on their own towards Mordor. (Note: Tolkien 1954, book 4, ch. 1 "The Taming of Sméagol")

Frodo and Sam confront Gollum in the Emyn Muil; Gollum nearly strangles Sam, but Frodo subdues him with his Elvish sword, Sting, which had once belonged to Bilbo. Sam ties an Elvish rope around Gollum's ankle as a leash, but the mere touch of the rope pains him. Taking pity on the wretched creature, just as Bilbo once had, Frodo makes Gollum swear to help them. Agreeing to the oath, Gollum swears by the Ring itself, and Frodo releases him. The unlikely company, guided by Gollum, makes their way to the Black Gate, the main entrance to Mordor. Frodo's kindness brings out Gollum's better nature, and he makes at least some effort to keep his promise. Sam, however, despises Gollum upon sight, and often warns Frodo of the creature's deception and slipperiness. (Note: Tolkien 1954, book 4, ch. 3, "The Black Gate is Closed")

When they reach the Black Gate and find it well-guarded, Gollum offers to lead them toward an alternative entrance into Mordor. Along the way, Frodo and Sam are seized by Faramir, and Gollum slips away uncaught (but not unseen) and follows them. (Note: Tolkien 1954, book 4, ch. 4, "Of Herbs and Stewed Rabbit") When Frodo allows Faramir to briefly take Gollum prisoner in order to spare his life, Gollum feels betrayed, and begins plotting against his new "master". Faramir finds out that Gollum is taking them to the pass of Cirith Ungol, an entrance to Mordor through the Ephel Dúath mountains. He warns Frodo and Sam of the evil of that place, as well as the treachery he senses in Gollum. (Note: Tolkien 1954, book 4, ch. 6, "The Forbidden Pool")

Frodo, Sam, and Gollum leave Faramir and climb the stairs to Cirith Ungol. Gollum slips away and visits Shelob, planning to betray the Hobbits by feeding them to her so that he can then get the Ring for himself. When he returns, he finds the hobbits asleep, and the sight of Frodo sleeping nearly moves Gollum to repent. However, Sam wakes up and speaks harshly to him, and the opportunity for redemption is lost. (Note: Tolkien 1954, book 4, ch. 8, "The Stairs of Cirith Ungol")

Gollum follows through with his plan and leads Frodo and Sam into Shelob's Lair. However, he disappears after entering the Lair, causing the Hobbits to realize he betrayed them. When Shelob begins chasing Frodo, Gollum takes the opportunity to attack Sam, who defeats him, and Gollum retreats. Frodo is soon stung by Shelob, taken prisoner by Orcs, and hauled to the Tower of Cirith Ungol. (Note: Tolkien 1954, book 4, ch. 9, "Shelob's Lair") Sam rescues Frodo from the Tower of Cirith Ungol and, dressed in scavenged Orc-armour, the two make their way across the plateau of Gorgoroth to Mount Doom. When Frodo and Sam almost reach their destination, Gollum attacks them, but Frodo throws him down. Sam faces Gollum on his own, letting Frodo continue up the mountain to finish their mission. Like Bilbo and Frodo before him, Sam spares Gollum's life out of pity, turns his back on the creature, and follows Frodo. (Note: Tolkien 1955, book 6, ch. 3, "Mount Doom")

Moments later, Frodo stands on the edge of the Crack of Doom, but claims the Ring for himself and put it on. Gollum strikes, struggles with the invisible Frodo, bites off Frodo's finger, and seizes the Ring. Gloating over his prize and dancing madly, he steps over the edge and falls into the Crack of Doom, taking the Ring with him with a last cry of "Precious!" Thus, the Ring is destroyed and Sauron defeated. Sam curses Gollum after his death, but Frodo urges his friend to forgive him, as without him the quest would have failed. (Note: Tolkien 1955, book 6, ch. 4, "The Field of Cormallen")

== Characteristics ==
A very large Gollum in Tove Jansson's illustration for the 1962 Swedish translation of The Hobbit, before Tolkien stated that the monster was small

In the first edition of The Hobbit, Tolkien made no reference to Gollum's size, leading illustrators such as the artist and author Tove Jansson to portray him as very large. Tolkien realised the omission, and added in later editions that Gollum was "a small slimy creature." The Two Towers characterises him as slightly larger than Sam; and later, comparing him to Shelob, one of the Orcs describes him as "rather like a spider himself, or perhaps like a starved frog." (Note: Tolkien 1954, book 4, ch. 10, "The Choices of Master Samwise")

The Hobbit states that Gollum has pockets, in which he keeps a tooth-sharpening-rock, goblin teeth, wet shells, and a scrap of bat wing; it describes him as having a thin face, "big round pale eyes", and being "as dark as darkness". In The Two Towers, rangers of Ithilien wonder if he is a tailless black squirrel. According to Sam in The Fellowship of the Ring, he has "paddle-feet, like a swan's almost, only they seemed bigger" when Gollum is following their boat by paddling a log down the River Anduin. In a manuscript written to guide illustrators to the appearance of his characters, Tolkien explained that Gollum has pale skin, but wears dark clothes and is often seen in poor light.

In The Fellowship of the Ring, Aragorn states that "his malice is great and gives him a strength hardly to be believed in one so lean and withered." (Note: Tolkien 1954a, book 2, ch. 2 "The Council of Elrond") In The Two Towers, Gollum's grip is described as "soft, but horribly strong" as he wrestles with Sam.

=== Personality ===
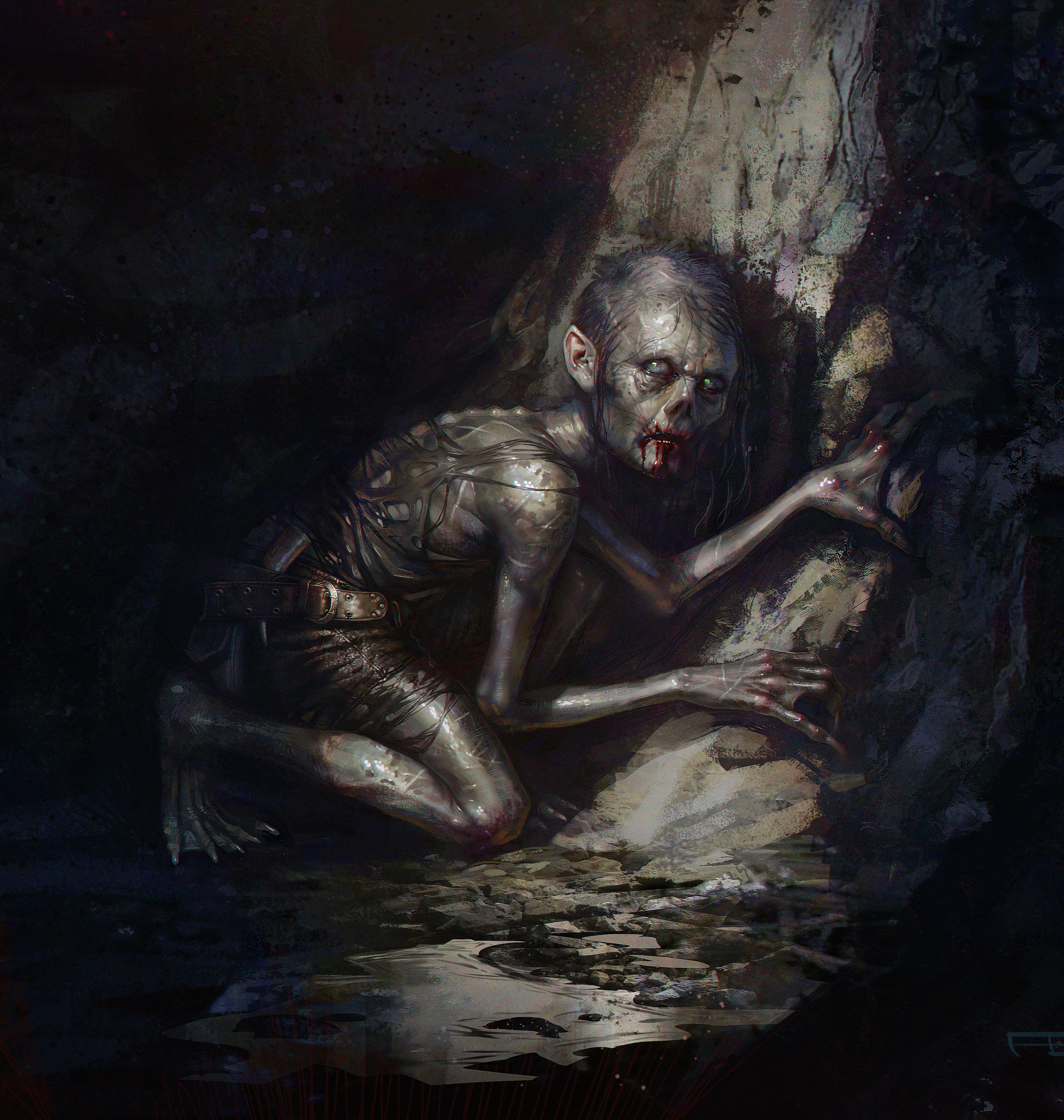
Gollum by Frederic Bennet, 2014 (detail)

Sam notes that Gollum has two distinct personalities: the sinister "Stinker" and the submissive "Slinker", with a green glint in his eyes showcasing the change between them. In "The Passage of the Marshes" chapter, Sam overhears a debate between the two, with the nefarious "Stinker" ultimately coming out on top. (Note: Tolkien 1954, book 4, ch. 2 "The Passage of the Marshes") However, as shown in "The Stairs of Cirith Ungol" chapter, Gollum often oscillates between good and evil. When Gollum stumbles upon Frodo and Sam outside of Shelob's Lair, he is briefly overcome and nearly repents, but this is ultimately ruined by Sam's sceptical remarks. Tolkien describes this as the story's most tragic moment, and he claims "Sam failed to note the complete change in Gollum's tone and aspect. Gollum's repentance was blighted, Frodo's pity was wasted, and Shelob's Lair became inevitable." (Note: Carpenter 2023, #246 to E. Elgar, September 1963)

Tolkien describes Gollum's personality after he had been captured by Frodo and Sam:

For that moment a change, which lasted for some time, came over him. He spoke with less hissing and whining, and he spoke to his companions direct, not to his precious self. He would cringe and flinch, if they stepped near him or made any sudden movement, and he avoided the touch of their elven-cloaks; but he was friendly, and indeed pitifully anxious to please. He would cackle with laughter and caper if any jest was made, or even if Frodo spoke kindly to him, and weep if Frodo rebuked him.

Gollum hates everything Elf-made. In The Two Towers, Sam bound Gollum's ankle with Elven rope, which caused Gollum excruciating pain by its mere presence. He was unable or unwilling to eat the lembas bread Sam and Frodo carried with them, and rejects cooked rabbit in favour of raw meat or fish.

=== Speech ===
Gollum speaks in an idiosyncratic manner, indeed in an idiolect, often referring to himself in the third person, and frequently talks to himself. In The Hobbit, he always refers to himself as "my precious". When not referring to himself in the third person, he sometimes speaks of himself in the plural as "we", hinting at his alter ego. The rare occasions when he actually says "I" are interpreted by Frodo as an indication that Sméagol's better self has the upper hand. Gollum also uses his own versions of words similar to the original words. He usually adds -es to the end of a plural, resulting in words such as "hobbitses" instead of hobbits or "birdses" instead of birds. When forming the present tense of verbs, he frequently extends the third person singular ending -s to other persons and numbers, resulting in constructions like "we hates it" (by analogy with "he hates it"). Gollum's speech emphasises sibilants, often drawing them out. (Note: Tolkien 1955, Appendix F: II, "On Translation")

=== Age ===
Through the influence of the Ring, Gollum's life was extended far beyond other members of his clan. An average hobbit lifespan is over 100 years, but a span of 556 years separates Gollum's finding of the Ring and its destruction, by which time he was almost 600 years old.

== Analysis ==
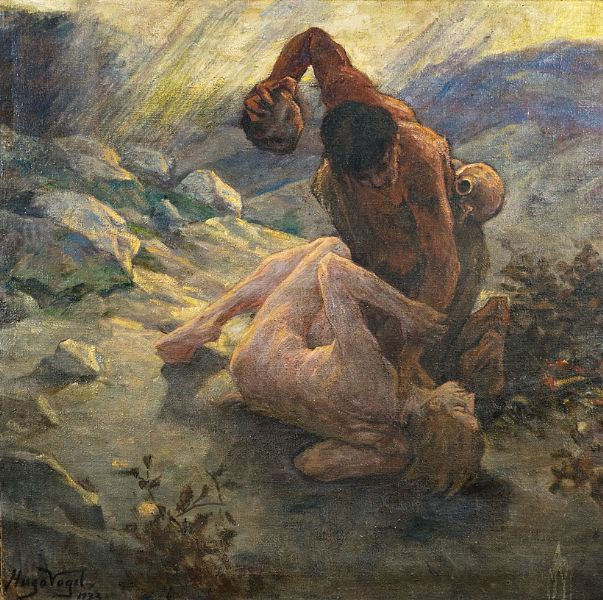
The story of Sméagol's murder of Déagol echoes the Biblical story of Cain and Abel. Cain Kills Abel by Hugo Vogel, 1922

=== Sméagol and Déagol ===
==== Cain, Abel, and Grendel ====
Commentators including the theologian Ralph C. Wood, and the critics Brent Nelson, Kathleen Gilligan, and Susan and Woody Wendling have remarked that Sméagol's murder of Déagol echoes Cain's killing of Abel in Genesis (4:1-18). Cain is jealous of his brother Abel; Sméagol is jealous of the shiny gold ring that his friend Déagol has found. Nelson observes that the names of the friends are similar, hinting that at least figuratively they are "brothers". Cain is guilty of Abel's murder, and ends up as a restless wanderer, never finding peace; Sméagol likewise is disowned and exiled by his family, and "wandered in loneliness". Nelson, describing Gollum as a "famous monster", notes that Tolkien was a famed scholar of the Old English poem Beowulf, which he acknowledged was a major source of his own fiction; (Note: Carpenter 2023, #25 to the editor of The Observer, February 1938, stating "Beowulf is among my most valued sources; though it was not consciously present to the mind in the process of writing") and that the Beowulf poet calls the monster Grendel one of the sons of Cain. Among the many parallels between Gollum and Grendel are their affinity for water, their isolation from society, and their bestial description. The Wendlings add that just as Beowulf confronts three monsters, starting with Grendel, in The Hobbit Bilbo confronts three, starting with Gollum; and again in The Lord of the Rings, Gollum is one of the three monsters that Frodo encounters.

The Tolkien scholar Verlyn Flieger suggests that Gollum is Tolkien's central monster-figure, likening him to both Grendel and the Beowulf dragon, "the twisted, broken, outcast hobbit whose manlike shape and dragonlike greed combine both the Beowulf kinds of monster in one figure".

==== Wagner's Der Ring des Nibelungen ====
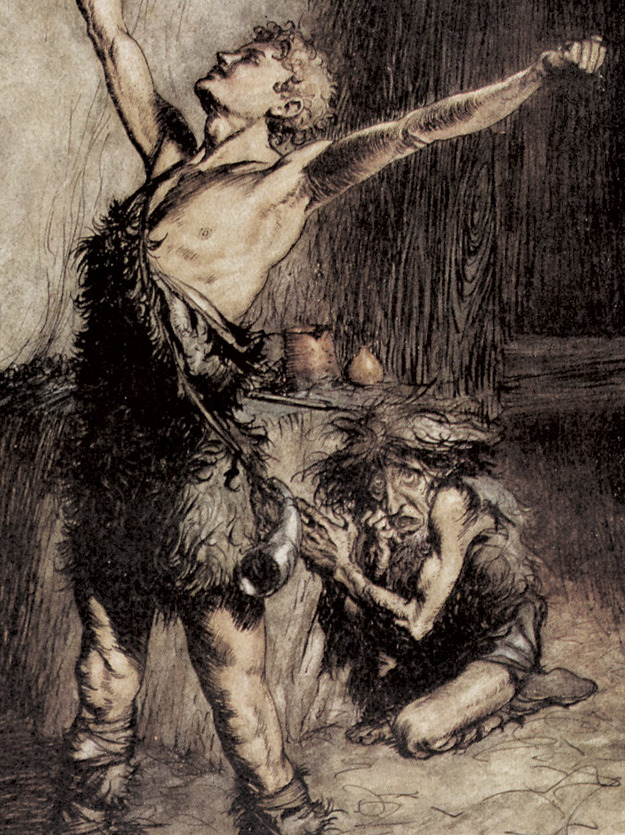
The shrunken gold-obsessed Mime, described as a Gollum-like figure, cowers behind the celebrating Siegfried in Wagner's Der Ring des Nibelungen. Illustration by Arthur Rackham, 1911

Jamie McGregor, writing in Mythlore, compares Sméagol's murder of Déagol to Fafner's murder of his brother Fasolt in Richard Wagner's Der Ring des Nibelungen. He notes that Tolkien denied any comparison of his Ring with Wagner's, and that this was accepted by his biographer Humphrey Carpenter. All the same, McGregor notes that Arthur Morgan identified evident parallels, starting with Alberich's curse: there is only one ring; it is cursed; it gives limitless power; owning it brings only misery, and it consumes its owner, who becomes its slave; its owner is called the Lord; owning it is living death.

McGregor further compares Déagol's delight in the ring with the Rhinemaidens' innocent rejoicing in their gold: "And behold! when he washed the mud away, there in his hand lay a beautiful golden ring; and it shone and glittered in the sun, so that his heart was glad". He draws a parallel between Sméagol's asking for the Ring with Fafner's; Déagol refuses, saying "I'm going to keep it", just as Fasolt says "I hold it: it belongs to me"; Sméagol derisively says "Oh, are you indeed, my love", and strangles him, turning by degrees into the wretched creature Gollum, while Fafner sourly says "Hold it fast in case it falls" and clubs Fasolt to death, becoming by degrees a treasure-fixated dragon.

Much later, Bilbo blunders into Gollum's cave and finds the Ring by accident; he holds off Gollum with his sword, and escapes by winning a peaceful battle, a riddle contest; Siegfried is led by Mime to the dragon's den, kills Fafner to save himself from being eaten; and takes the ring as a bird's voice suggests it. Alberich had cursed the "thief" who took the ring; Gollum curses Bilbo for taking his Ring. On the other hand, McGregor writes, Siegfried is a hero, Bilbo, an anti-hero; and the shrunken Mime is the most Gollum-like character in Wagner's Ring Cycle.

=== Playing a part in a cosmic game ===
David Callaway, in Mythlore, writes that Tolkien, a devout Roman Catholic, had made Middle-earth a place where good and evil are in conflict under an omnipotent god, Eru Ilúvatar: in other words, "his cosmology is Christian". Callaway describes Gollum as fitting into this framework as a being not wholly evil, able to make moral choices.

The Episcopal priest Fleming Rutledge writes that at the Council of Elrond, Frodo angrily resists the notion that Gollum was a Hobbit like himself. She adds that Gandalf describes the tale of Gollum's enslavement to the Ring as "a sad story" rather than as Frodo's description of him, "loathsome". Gandalf says that Gollum "had no will left in the matter", and could not get rid of the Ring; instead, "the Ring itself .. decided things". Rutledge comments that the sad story has happened to everybody, trapped, as Christians believe, in "Sin and Death", and states that

The genuinely revolting Gollum is central not only to the surface narrative, ... but also to the underlying theological drama.

Eru makes use of every being's choices for good: Callaway gives as example the way that Gríma Wormtongue's angry throwing of the palantír, a crystal ball-like stone of seeing, enables Pippin Took to look in the stone and reveal himself to Sauron; in turn, Sauron jumps to a wrong conclusion about the stone and the hobbit, which assists the Fellowship in completing their quest, destroying the One Ring. Similarly, Callaway argues, Gollum "is being partly manipulated by Eru in this cosmic chess game" citing Gandalf's remark that Gollum "has some part to play yet, for good or ill". Indeed, Gollum's alter ego, Sméagol, struggles to be good, speaks the truth when questioned by Frodo, and guides them through the Dead Marshes. In short, as Tolkien writes, Gollum is "not altogether wicked". Finally, at the end of the quest inside Mount Doom, Gollum takes the Ring from Frodo, and causes it to be destroyed, completing the quest successfully at the moment that Frodo had announced that he would keep the Ring. Callaway calls this "the ultimate heroic self-sacrifice", arguing that Gollum acted "consciously" using "the good fraction in his mind finally overpowering the Ring's evil".

=== Degenerate ===
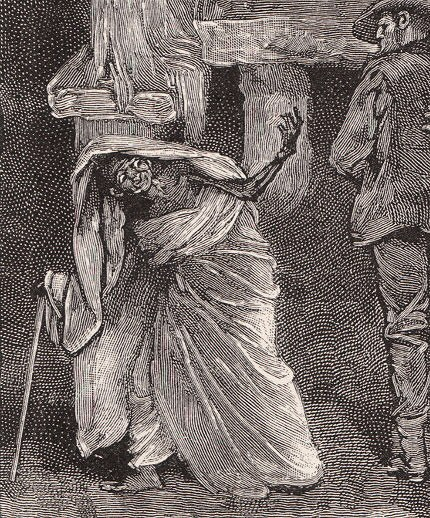
Gollum may derive from the "shrunken" Gagool in Rider Haggard's King Solomon's Mines. 1888 illustration by Walter Paget

The English literature scholars William N. Rogers II and Michael R. Underwood compare Gollum to the similarly named evil and ancient hag Gagool in Rider Haggard's 1885 novel King Solomon's Mines; Tolkien acknowledged Haggard, especially his novel She, as a major influence. They note that Haggard's tales share many motifs with Tolkien's The Hobbit, including a non-heroic narrator who turns out to be brave and capable in a crisis; a group of male characters on a quest; dangers in caves; a goal of treasure; and return to a happy countryside. Gollum and Gagool both have a monstrous character, Gagool being described as

a withered-up monkey [that] crept on all fours ... a most extraordinary and weird countenance. It was (apparently) that of a woman of great age, so shrunken that in size it was no larger than that of a year-old child, and was made up of a collection of deep yellow wrinkles ... a pair of large black eyes, still full of fire and intelligence, which gleamed and played under the snow-white eyebrows, and the projecting parchment-coloured skull, like jewels in a charnel-house. As for the skull itself, it was perfectly bare, and yellow in hue, while its wrinkled scalp moved and contracted like the hood of a cobra." —King Solomon's Mines, 1885

Rogers and Underwood note that Gagool rejoices in "blood and death". Like Gollum, she is human-like but distorted to a parody; she is shrunken and extremely old; her large eyes and speech are distinctive; and she is wholly materialistic, with a "terrible greediness and self-referencing" and "the insatiable claims of the naked ego". They mention also the cultural background of the late 19th century, combining economic recession, fear of moral decline and degeneration leading indeed to eugenics, and a "for-the-moment hedonism" in the face of these concerns. They comment that Gagool can be seen as a "worst-case" embodiment of such Victorian era fears.

Dale Nelson, writing in the J. R. R. Tolkien Encyclopedia, suggests that Gollum may derive from H. G. Wells's Morlocks in his 1895 novel The Time Machine. They have "dull white" skin with a "bleached look", "strange large grayish-red eyes" with "a capacity for reflecting light", and run in a low posture somewhere close to all fours, looking like "a human spider", through having lived for generations underground in darkness.

Tom Birkett, writing in A Companion to J. R. R. Tolkien, likens Gollum to Hreiðmarr's son in the Völsunga saga, who took the shape of an otter to catch fish; in the myth, the gods pay a ring as ransom when they kill the otter. Birkett comments on the resemblance to Gollum of "this semi-aquatic creature, greedily devouring fish in a mountain pool".

A 2004 paper in the British Medical Journal by supervised students at University College London noted that over 1300 websites had discussed possible diagnoses for Gollum's apparent mental illness, and argued that Gollum meets seven of the nine diagnostic criteria for schizoid personality disorder.

=== Psychological pairings ===
A variety of commentators have suggested that Gollum constitutes a "shadow figure" for Frodo, as his dark alter ego ("other self") according to Carl Jung's theory of psychological individuation. Some have identified many such "pairings", such as Denethor as a shadow for Théoden, Boromir for Aragorn, Saruman for Gandalf, Ted Sandyman for Sam Gamgee, the Barrow-wight for Tom Bombadil, and Shelob for Galadriel, but the Gollum/Frodo pairing is by far the most widely accepted.

The Tolkien scholar Charles W. Nelson described Gollum as an evil guide, contrasted with Gandalf, the good guide (like Virgil in Dante's Inferno) in The Lord of the Rings. He notes, too, that both Gollum and Gandalf are servants of The One, Eru Ilúvatar, in the struggle against the forces of darkness, and "ironically" all of them, good and bad, are necessary to the success of the quest.

=== Fully-developed character ===
Elizabeth Arthur, writing in Mythlore, argues that Gollum is the "most fully-rounded character" in the novel, and "in his way, he is the hero". Where many of the other characters are flattened to more or less Jungian archetypes, she writes, Gollum is complex and of two minds, as people often are. Arthur notes Ursula Le Guin's comment that the character made up of Frodo, Sam, Gollum, and Sméagol is genuinely interesting. Arthur argues that it is Gollum's final act that " frees the world from the Great Darkness. Gollum is nobody's Shadow; he carries his own Shadow with him, and that makes him a whole person." He is in no way heroic, but, Arthur writes, he is "a kind of hero ... fighting the long defeat, and who destroys the Ring because he loves and hates it, because he is happy at last."

== Adaptations ==
=== Animations ===
Gollum does nothing in Gene Deitch's 1967 short The Hobbit except sit in his boat.

Gollum's first known screen adaptation is in Gene Deitch's 1967 short film The Hobbit, where his role is reduced from the action described in the novel to appearing in a single scene which depicts him sitting in his boat.

A somewhat froglike Gollum in Rankin/Bass's animated 1977 The Hobbit

In the 1977 Rankin/Bass adaptation of The Hobbit and its 1980 The Return of the King, Gollum was voiced by Brother Theodore. He appeared somewhat froglike.

Gollum in Ralph Bakshi's animated 1978 version of The Lord of the Rings

In Ralph Bakshi's 1978 animated film adaptation of The Lord of the Rings, as in the 1981 BBC radio dramatisation, Gollum was voiced by Peter Woodthorpe. Austin Gilkeson, writing on TOR.com, called the prologue with the "snaring and transformation of Gollum" "beautifully rendered as black shadows cast against a red canvas" like a shadow play or a medieval tapestry come to life, with a mix of animation, painted backgrounds, and rotoscoping.

=== Television plays ===
A green-clad Gollum with something like a cabbage leaf on his head, in Leningrad Television's 1991 Khraniteli

In the Soviet-era television film Сказочное путешествие мистера Бильбо Бэггинса, Хоббита (The Fairytale Journey of Mr. Bilbo Baggins, The Hobbit) of 1985, a green-faced Gollum is portrayed by Igor Dmitriev.

A different Russian Gollum was played by Viktor Smirnov in Leningrad Television's two-part 1991 TV play Khraniteli, rediscovered in 2021. Variety reported that "he's speaking Russian, sports orange eye-shadow and has what appears to be bright green cabbage leaves pasted to his head."

Kari Väänänen portrayed Gollum (Finnish: Klonkku) in the 1993 live-action television miniseries Hobitit [The hobbits] produced and broadcast by the Finnish network Yle.

=== Jackson's feature films ===
==== Andy Serkis, motion capture, and CGI ====
Gollum was voiced and performed by Andy Serkis in Peter Jackson's live-action version of The Lord of the Rings, using motion capture.

In Peter Jackson's The Lord of the Rings film trilogy, Gollum is a CGI character voiced and performed by the actor Andy Serkis. He is smaller than Frodo or Sam, but has considerable strength and agility. Barely glimpsed in The Fellowship of the Ring (2001), he becomes a central character in The Two Towers (2002) and The Return of the King (2003). The CGI character was built around Serkis's facial features, voice, and acting choices, and is depicted naked but for a loincloth. Serkis based the iconic "gollum" throat noise on the sound of his cat coughing up hairballs. Using a digital puppet created by Jason Schleifer and Bay Raitt at Weta Digital, animators created Gollum's performance using a mixture of motion capture data recorded from Serkis and the traditional animation process of key frame, along with the laborious process of digitally rotoscoping Serkis's image and replacing it with the digital Gollum's in a technique coined rotoanimation. Daniel Timmons admired the motion-capture, stating that it brilliantly animated Gollum. Susan Booker said that Gollum "came to life for viewers" through Serkis's acting and Jackson's "electronic wizardry". David Bratman however wrote "How much greater Sméagol's agony is in the book, how much more moving and better-written than the films", arguing that Tolkien's account of Gollum's being "in two minds about his role" is more appropriate than what he considers Jackson's unsophisticated dialogue, with its thrice-repeated "Leave now and never come back".

In The Return of the King, Serkis himself appears in a flashback scene as Sméagol before his degeneration into Gollum. This scene, originally for The Two Towers, was held back to allow audiences to become familiar with Gollum and so relate better to the original Sméagol. The decision meant that Raitt and Jamie Beswarick had to redesign Gollum's face for the second and third films to resemble Serkis's more closely. Serkis again played Gollum in the 2012 prequel The Hobbit: An Unexpected Journey.

Wizard magazine rated Serkis's Gollum as 62nd of the 100 greatest villains in visual media. Serkis as Gollum was 13th on Empire magazine's "100 Greatest Movie Characters of all Time".

==== The "Gollum and Sméagol" scene ====
The start of the "Gollum and Sméagol" scene
Speaker	Dialogue	Notes
Gollum	We wants it. We needs it. Must have the precious. They stole it from us. Sneaky little Hobbitses. Wicked. Tricksy. False.	Distant shot; cut to closer shot, still of Gollum
Sméagol	No. Not master.	Camera arcs round to Gollum's other side, with "milder 'Sméagol' expression"
Gollum	Yes, precious. False. They will cheat you, hurt you, lie!	Camera arcs back, again without a cut
Sméagol	Master's my friend.	First shot/reverse shot cut; 18 more follow

In the "Gollum and Sméagol" scene (number 29) in The Two Towers, Gollum's split personality is directly represented as a pair of entities. The screenwriters Fran Walsh and Philippa Boyens shaped it as an argument between the childlike "Sméagol" and the evil "Gollum". The film scholar Kristin Thompson called it "perhaps the most celebrated scene in the entire film", commenting that it "[drew] gasps from audience members ... at the first cut to Sméagol as an apparently separate character facing himself as Gollum." She comments that the "subtle combination of framing, camera movement, editing, and character glances" requires frame-by-frame analysis to understand in full how Walsh's direction of the scene (to Jackson's instructions) manages "to suggest the conflict between Gollum's two sides". The Tolkien scholar Tom Shippey describes Jackson's treatment of Gollum as "masterful all through" and the arguing with himself scene as "especially good and original".

The scene uses the long-established shot/reverse shot convention for film dialogue between two people, switching between them, with a three-quarter view of each character, one looking to the left, one to the right. What is new is the technique's application to a single character. Thompson notes however that the scene introduces Gollum and Sméagol by "arcing" continuously from Gollum to Sméagol and back again, rather than by cutting. The argument then proceeds with nineteen shot/reverse shots. Thompson comments that "this scene's ability to make us apparently see two characters arguing with each other when only one is actually present creates an eerie, even astonishing moment that transcends the presentation in the book".

=== Fan film ===
Gollum is the eponymous character in The Hunt for Gollum, an independently produced 2009 prequel to the Jackson films directed by Chris Bouchard. Bouchard's CGI Gollum, voiced by Gareth Brough, looks much like the Gollum of the Jackson films.

=== Other media ===
Serkis and Gollum appeared on the 2003 MTV Movie Awards, when Gollum won "Best Virtual Performance" and went on to deliver an obscenity-laden acceptance speech in character, so well received that it won the Hugo Award for Best Dramatic Presentation, Short Form.

In Canada, Gollum was portrayed by Michael Therriault in the three-hour stage production of The Lord of the Rings, which opened in 2006 in Toronto. He won a Dora Award for the performance.

Gollum appears in a 1989 three-part comic book adaptation of The Hobbit, scripted by Chuck Dixon and Sean Deming and illustrated by David Wenzel.

The Lord of the Rings: Gollum, a video game centred on Gollum, was released in 2023, for Microsoft Windows, PlayStation 4, PlayStation 5, Xbox One, and Xbox Series X/S, by Daedalic Entertainment.

== Cultural references ==
The rock band Led Zeppelin mention Gollum and Mordor in their 1969 song "Ramble On", with the lyrics "Twas in the darkest depths of Mordor / I met a girl so fair / But Gollum, and the evil one crept up / And slipped away with her".

== See also ==
- Erdoğan–Gollum comparison trials
