= Debbie Leifer =

American female magician

Debbie Leifer was named 2006 Greater Atlanta Magician Of The Year by the International Brotherhood of Magicians and the Society Of American Magicians Atlanta chapters. Debbie is the first female corporate magician to receive that honor in the 35-year history of the prestigious award.

She has appeared with Ray Charles, Joan Rivers, Gladys Knight, Phil Collins, The Platters, and Earth Wind & Fire, and she had the honor of teaching magic to Muhammad Ali.

The subject of a chapter titled "Wonder Woman", Debbie was the only female magician featured in the book A Career In Magic. She has appeared on FOX television five times, and was a featured entertainer at the International Energy Exhibition & World's Fair, two Super Bowls, the NBA All-Star Game, and the 1996 Centennial Olympic Games.

Editor of the Equinox Magical Journal, Debbie serves on the board of directors of the Atlanta, Georgia, chapter of the International Brotherhood of Magicians, and on the National Council of the Society of American Magicians.

Debbie was the first female demonstrator in the 50-year history of Tannen's Magic Shop in New York City, one of the world's premiere magic stores; she was the only female president of F.A.M.E. (Future American Magical Entertainers), a New York City-based teenage magic club that began in the 1950s.

Articles profiling Leifer have appeared in the Atlanta Journal-Constitution, Solutions Magazine, Chai Magazine, the Marietta Daily Journal, the Knoxville News-Sentinel, and her magic shows have been covered by the New York Daily News and The New York Times.

Leifer was the female star of "Holiday Magic Show" in Hong Kong, she has toured Japan five times, and has performed on cruise ships throughout the Caribbean. Star of the sold-out fundraiser "A Magical Connection", Leifer devotes herself to a significant amount of charitable performances every year, including raising significant money for tsunami relief and Katrina relief in 2005, and she continues to focus on hunger relief charities.

== Sources ==
- About.com article February 2007
- Magic Broadcast Radio Interview March 2007
- Society of American Magicians July 2007 Dallas Magic Convention Speakers
