= Howie Schwarzman =

American magician (1927–2020)

Howard Schwarzman (November 20, 1927 – July 21, 2020, New York City) was an American magician, card manipulator, sleight of hand expert, and trick inventor. Considered a "living legend" in the Eastern United States magician community, he was best known as a columnist within the magician trade press, and an importer of very rare tricks from outside the United States.

== Biography ==
In his youth, Schwarzman was considered a "red-headed prodigy", and was mentored by New York orchestra leader Richard Himber, creator of the Linking Finger-Ring trick (which later became part of David Copperfield's stage repertoire). Schwarzman was known for pulling pranks at Himber's request, such as impersonating mentalist Joseph Dunninger. In 1962, Schwarzman began mentoring himself, working with the teenaged Denny Haney, who he booked to perform at the Society of American Magicians.

Schwarzman was one of the charter members of Future American Magical Entertainers (F.A.M.E.), which is a magic club created for young magicians in New York City in the 1940s, under the tutelage of Professor Abe Hurwitz, father of Shari Lewis, known as Peter Pan The Magic Man.

Schwarzman became a magic dealer in 1976 and specialized in rare imported tricks, including those from Lubor Fiedler. He also wrote a popular column, "I've Said It Before", for Tannen’s Magic Manuscript Magazine. He also edited "Professional Card Magic," by Cliff Green, published in 1961 by Lou Tannen.

He was a member of the Parent Assembly Nr. 1 of the Society of American Magicians for 45 years, and was named "Magician of the Year" in 2007. Schwarzman was also a long time attendee at FFFF, "Fechter's Finger Flicking Frolic," a yearly, invitation-only convention for 200 of the world's best close-up magicians held in upstate New York. Much to the chagrin of his late wife, Laura, he never missed a convention for any wedding, funeral, bar mitzvah or christening.

When Schwarzman first began to lecture at magicians clubs in 1961, Dai Vernon said of him, "In the last few years, you have certainly taken your place among the top flight card men in New York ... I think I'm familiar with the work of almost everyone interested in card handling, both professional and amateur, in this country. I unhesitatingly assert you can hold your own in the fastest company." Vernon had known of Schwarzman for years; in a copy of his 1949 pamphlet, "Dai Vernon's Select Secrets," Vernon wrote, "Warmest Magical Wishes to 'Howie,' who is one of the younger and better magic performers."

Schwarzman retired in 1993, but attended many major magic conventions and gave occasional lectures, selling his "Dynamic Deceptions" notes. He lived in Baltimore, Maryland. Until several years ago, he regularly flew his own airplane. He played more than 2000 pop songs from the 20s, 30s, and 40s, on the piano from memory.

== Selected works ==
- Dynamic Deceptions: Close Up Magic by Howard Schwarzman (lecture notes)
- MUM Reprint of Howard Schwarzman's column "I've Said It Before" from May 2007 onwards
