= The Hobbit (1985 film) =

1985 Soviet television play

- Bilbo Baggins encounters Gollum
- Also known as: The Fabulous Journey of Mr. Bilbo Baggins, The Hobbit, Across the Wild Land, Through the Dark Forest, Beyond the Misty Mountains. There and Back Again
- Based on: The Hobbit by J. R. R. Tolkien
- Written by: Tamara Yakovleva
- Directed by: Vladimir Latyshev
- Starring: Anatoly Ravikovich; Ivan Krasko; Igor Dmitriev
- Narrated by: Zinovy Gerdt
- Music by: Vladislav Uspensky
- Country of origin: Soviet Union
- Original language: Russian

Production
- Cinematography: Aleksandr Degterev
- Running time: 71 minutes
- Production company: Lentelefilm

Original release
- Network: Leningrad TV Channel
- Release: 1985

The Hobbit (Russian: Хо́ббит, romanized: Khóbbit), full title The Fabulous Journey of Mr. Bilbo Baggins, The Hobbit, Across the Wild Land, Through the Dark Forest, Beyond the Misty Mountains. There and Back Again is a 1985 Soviet television play for children. It is an adaptation of J. R. R. Tolkien's 1937 children's fantasy novel The Hobbit by Vladimir Latyshev.

The play was shot in 1984 as a teleplay and produced in the framework of the children's TV series Tale after Tale (Russian: Сказка за сказкой) and aired at the Leningrad TV Channel in the 1980s and the 1990s.

== Plot ==
The play follows Bilbo's journey with Thorin and the Dwarves (Dwalin, Balin, Kili, Fili, Dori, Nori, Ori, Oin, Gloin, Bifur, Bofur, and Bombur), advised by Gandalf, to the Lonely Mountain to steal back the Dwarves treasure from the dragon Smaug. On the way they meet the Goblins, the creature Gollum, and the giant spiders of Mirkwood. The plot omits the three Trolls, the party's stay in Rivendell with Elrond, their stay with Beorn, and their imprisonment by the Elvenking's Wood-Elves.

== Production ==
The play featured Zinovy Gerdt as "the professor" (a narrator stand-in for Tolkien), Mikhail Danilov as Bilbo Baggins, Anatoly Ravikovich as Thorin Oakenshield and Igor Dmitriev as Gollum. Smaug and the Mirkwood spiders were portrayed by puppets. Missing in this version are the trolls, Elrond, Beorn and the wood-elves. The goblins were human-like with little makeup, and were portrayed by dancers from the Leningrad State Academic Opera and Ballet Theatre, as are the inhabitants of Lake Town.

== Cast ==
The cast is as follows:

- Zinovy Gerdt – "The professor" (a narrator stand-in for J. R. R. Tolkien)
- Mikhail Danilov – Bilbo Baggins
- Ivan Krasko – Gandalf
- Igor Dmitriev – Gollum
- Anatoly Ravikovich – Thorin Oakenshield
- Georgy Korolchuk – Kíli
- Mikhail Kuznetsov – Fíli
- Alexey Kozhevnikov – Balin
- Nikolai Gavrilov – Dwalin
- Kirill Dateshidze – Dori
- Vladimir Kozlov – Nori
- Oleg Levakov – Ori
- Yuri Zatravkin – Glóin
- Vladimir Lelyotko – Óin
- Mikhail Khrabrov – Bofur
- Yuri Ovsyanko – Bifur
- Alexander Isakov – Bombur
- Boris Sokolov – Bard the Bowman
- Alexei Cukanov – dragon Smaug
- Vladimir Martianov – spider (voice)
- Igor Muravyov – spider (voice)
- Mikhail Matveyev – leader of the goblins
- Leonard Sekirin – goblin
- Alexander Slanksnis – goblin

== Release ==
The film was first aired in 1985 at the Leningrad TV Channel, and then repeatedly in the 1980s and the 1990s. It has appeared on DVD, although the TV and DVD versions each contain material that the other does not. The timing of the versions differs by 50 seconds. No subtitles were included, but fan-made subtitles have since appeared. The film was released on the official YouTube channel of 5TV on Dec 9, 2014.

== See also ==
- Adaptations of The Hobbit
- Khraniteli
