= Frank Garcia (magician) =

American magician (1927–1993)

- Born: Frank Garcia; May 8, 1927; Manhattan, New York, US
- Died: July 15, 1993 (aged 66)
- Occupation(s): Magician, performer, teacher, author
- Known for: sleight of hand, card magic, card sharp
- Height: 6 ft 2 in (1.88 m)
- Spouse: Betty Lou Field-Garcia (Moss)
- Children: 1

Frank Garcia (May 8, 1927 – July 15, 1993) was a magician and professional gambler. He was known as "The Man With The Million Dollar Hands." His specialty was gambling scams and cheating.

== Biography ==
The son of Spanish immigrants, he decided to become a magician after seeing a performance of David "Fu Manchu" Bamberg.

As "The Gambling Investigator" he demonstrated and exposed cheating methods at trade shows and to law enforcement organizations throughout the United States and on television shows. Frank Garcia wrote and lectured about the subject throughout his life.

Garcia made "close-up" work his domain. His repertory of card manipulations, sponge-ball magic, cups and balls, and sleight-of-hand was highly regarded by his peers.

Frank was a frequent guest on TV talk shows including The Dick Cavett Show, and David Suskind, sometimes performing magic and sometimes revealing the scams of crooked gamblers such as three card monte players on the streets of New York.

== Career ==
Frank Garcia began his professional magic career in New York City, where he became known for his expertise in sleight of hand and card manipulation. He gained recognition for his performances at private clubs and television appearances, including talk shows hosted by David Letterman and Johnny Carson.

Garcia co-founded the New York School for Magicians with fellow magician George Schindler, where they taught aspiring magicians and helped nurture a new generation of performers. He also authored several influential magic books, including Million Dollar Card Secrets and Super Subtle Card Miracles, which became essential texts for magicians worldwide.

In addition to his entertainment career, Garcia collaborated with law enforcement agencies, including the FBI and U.S. Department of Defense, to demonstrate and explain card and gambling scams. His work helped educate officials about con games and cheating techniques used in casinos and on the street.

== Published works ==
In the course of his life, Garcia wrote 22 books, covering topics such as card cheating, gambling, and especially close-up card magic. Some of his magic books are considered collector's items. His most notable books are:

- Encyclopedia of Sponge Ball Magic (1976)
- Million Dollar Card Secrets (1972)
- Super Subtle Card Miracles (1973)
- Exclusive Card Secrets (1980)
- Exclusive Card Miracles (1980)
- The Close Up Card Magic of Frank Garcia, Part I (1982)
- The Close Up Card Magic of Frank Garcia, Part II (1982)
- Marked Cards And Loaded Dice (1962) which was later released as How To Detect Crooked Gambling (1977)
- All In A Nutshell (1974)
- Don't Bet On It! (1978)
- Magic With Cards (1974) (co-authored with George Schindler)
- Amedeo's Continental Magic (co-authored with George Schindler)

== Death ==
Frank Garcia died at age 66 from natural causes at his home in Manhattan on July 15, 1993. He is survived by his wife, Betty Moss, and a son Frank.
