= Dorothy Dietrich =

American stage magician and escapologist (born 1969)

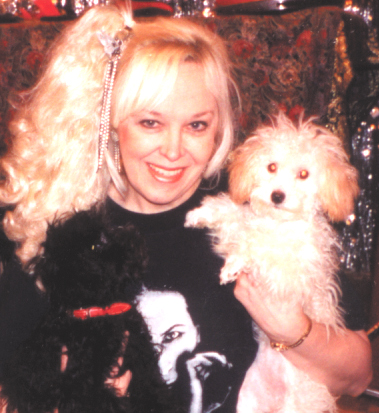
- Dietrich in 2008
- Born: April 1, 1948 (age 78); Erie, Pennsylvania, U.S.
- Occupations: Magician, illusionist, escapologist, stunt performer, actor, historian
- Website: dorothydietrich.com

Dorothy Dietrich (born April 1, 1948) is an American stage magician and escapologist, best known for performing the bullet catch in her mouth and the first woman to perform a straitjacket escape while suspended hundreds of feet in the air from a burning rope. She was the first woman to gain prominence as an escape artist since the days of Houdini, breaking the glass ceiling for women in the field of escapes and magic.

The 2006 Columbia Encyclopedia included Dietrich among their "eight most noted magicians of the late 20th century", and entertainment writer Samantha Hart in Hollywood Walk of Fame: 2000 Sensational Stars, Star Makers and Legends, called her a "world-class magician" and "one of the world's leading female magicians". Early on, as a teenager, she already was referred to as "The First Lady of Magic", a reference later copied by others. Dietrich, often called the female Houdini, has duplicated many of Houdini's original escapes, and has gone one step further by doing the Jinxed Bullet Catch Stunt – the one that Houdini backed away from.

== Early career ==
Dorothy Dietrich is a native of Erie, Pennsylvania. In a six-page article about the history of women in magic in the women's magazine, Bust, which contained only two full-page pictures, one of Adelaide Herrmann and the other of Dietrich, Nichole Summer writes:

Growing up in rural Pennsylvania with six brothers, she often found herself tied up as the damsel in distress during their games of cowboy and Indians but would somehow manage to escape on her own. When an aunt saw her freeing herself one day, she said to her, "Who do you think you are, Houdini?" Dietrich had no clue who Houdini was but set off for the local library to find out. Doing odd jobs, at the age of 13, she saved enough money as a young teen to hitch a ride with a girlfriend's older brother to New York and ran away from her abusive father, her first true escape act.

Among the books that inspired her as a child was a biography of Houdini, who became a childhood idol, a fact that later influenced her desire to perform magic and escapes.

Early on, she learned her craft mostly from books. In New York, she auditioned for Westchester Department of Parks from an ad in a show business newspaper and was booked on the spot for a full summer of work, was recommended to the school district for the winter months, and re-booked the following summer for an increase in dates and price. Around this same time she earned her performing chops working a dime museum "grind show" Ten-in-One operation in Times Square run by legendary mouse pitchman Tommy Laird with such performers as Earl "Presto" Johnson, Lou Lancaster, Chris Capehart, Dick Brooks (a.k.a. Brookz), and others. Showcasing for the Parent Assembly of the Society of American Magicians at about the same time, well-known magicians Russell Swann and Walter B. Gibson, captivated by her performance style, took her under their wing. Walter Gibson, who was a confidant and biographer of Houdini's, said "What you have is very reminiscent of Houdini, when Houdini came out on stage, the audience automatically fell in love with him. In my long years I've never seen anyone who had that." Dietrich also studied with "Coney Island Fakir" Al Flosso (for the coin routine), a regular performer on the Ed Sullivan television show, Jack London (for the bullet catch) and Lou Lancaster with the Milk Can and the Straitjacket escape, as well as sleight-of-hand magic. "The recognition gradually put Dorothy Dietrich and her magic into resort hotels, nightclubs, school and college auditoriums, trade shows." She became a favorite of several New York booking agents.

== Innovative routines ==
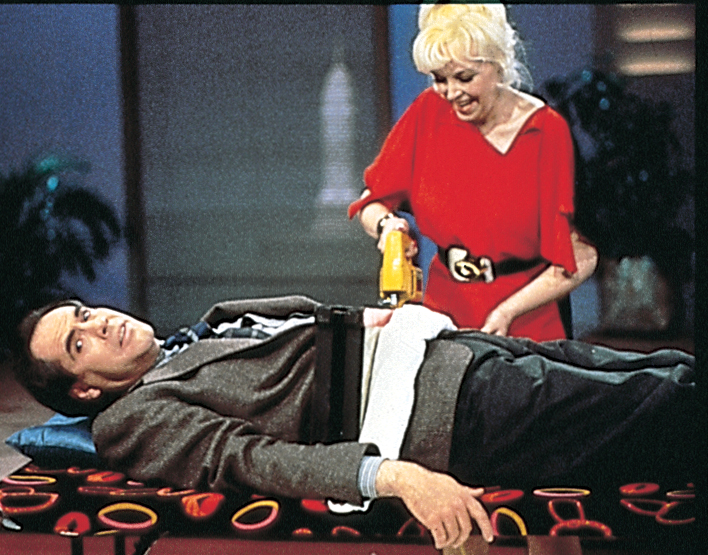
Dorothy Dietrich sawing celebrity comedian Robert Klein in half on TV

She developed what is known as a flash act that included doves, a rabbit, a duck and two poodles. Early on she was considered a "leading dove worker". She also developed several routines few women had ever attempted. Sawing men in half, escaping from a straitjacket, sleight of hand with coins via the Misers Dream, The Bullet Catch, and levitating audience members. It was her goal to level the playing field between men and women in the field of magic, and to innovate and break barriers where no women, and in some cases no men, have gone. Until she broke many of these barriers, women were not allowed full membership in organizations such as The Society of American Magicians, which she tried to join. She has pioneered and paved the way for women in the field today.

Dietrich has created special shows for such companies as Maidenform, Pooltrol, Yago Sangria, Manhattan Shirts, as well as fashion and cosmetic companies. She is a regular performer for trade and industrial events.

== Television ==
On television, Dorothy Dietrich won attention as a woman who, instead of allowing herself to be sawed in half, reversed the traditional illusion and severed into two parts the male hosts of talk shows and network specials. As word got around she was called to do a Bill Cosby special while still in her early teens, but with the help of her sophisticated style and makeup she passed as an adult and was able to work night clubs and banquets in the best hotels and venues. Cosby was so impressed that he recommended her to several agents. At this same time she performed with Loretta Lynn, Dick Van Patten, Henny Youngman, Jonathan Winters, and Tony Randall.

Dietrich was co-editor, contributor and publisher of Hocus Pocus Magazine along with magician/mentalist Dick Brooks. In addition to escapes and large-scale stunts, Dietrich has performs illusions with live animals such as doves, rabbits, poodles and ducks. She is also known for sawing men in half. She also does an updated version of the classic Miser's Dream, plucking coins from the air, nose, ears and pockets of a youngster from the audience. She is also known for levitating volunteers from the audience.

== The bullet catch ==
In 2008, Bust reported about Dietrich's 1988 attempt to catch a bullet in a metal cup in her mouth. She performed it at Donald Trump's Resorts International's 10th anniversary in Atlantic City, New Jersey. It was televised on a special called, Just For The Record, The Best Of Everything. This came about after catching a .22 caliber bullet for the yearly convention of the International Brotherhood of Magicians in Pittsburgh. It was shown on Network TV's Evening Magazine, and on The New You Asked For It with Rich Little as host. She performed it again in Canada on a TV show called Autobus du Canada for the highest amount ever paid a magician on Canadian television. It was done under test conditions with the bullets bought by a committee. Brought in under guard, an independent marksman picked and fired the bullet. One of two chosen bullets was fired into a concrete backstop and the second was fired at Dorothy. Dietrich challenged anyone who could prove that the bullet did not leave from the gun by offering a $10,000 reward. Feature stories and articles about her have appeared in major publications such as The New York Times and TV Guide.

== Houdini Magical Hall of Fame ==
On exhibit for many years at the Houdini Magical Hall of Fame in Niagara Falls, Canada, until it burned down, was a large two-panel display of Dorothy Dietrich and her accomplishments as "The Female Houdini". A similar display is now shown at Scranton's Houdini Museum.

== The Houdini seances ==
For many years she held the Houdini seances in New York as a tribute to the legendary magician, continuing a tradition started by Houdini's wife and passed on to Walter B. Gibson. Even though Bess gave up the séances herself, she asked magician Walter B. Gibson to carry on the October 31 tradition. For many years, Gibson, along with several other magicians, held the séances at the Magic Towne House in New York City. Before Gibson died he asked Dietrich to carry on the tradition. Walter was a confidant and biographer of Houdini and also wrote the famous Shadow series. Dietrich continues the seances at The Houdini Museum in Scranton, Pennsylvania, each Halloween, the day Houdini died. The seances have been shown on such shows as TV Land: Myths and Legends, Biography's Dead Famous-Houdini and Exploring the Unknown. The seances at the Houdini Museum in Scranton are often attended by the Houdini family, who are the closest living relatives of Bess Houdini, making this the closest event connected back to the original seances that Bess Houdini held.

== Debunker ==
Dietrich also crusades against those who falsely claim to speak to dead relatives of vulnerable grieving citizens. Early on, Dietrich realized that there were those who would use magic and various deceptive arts to manipulate and even cheat people out of money. So following in the footsteps of famous debunkers who came before her, such as Houdini, Milbourne Christopher and James Randi, she takes on such a role where possible. She has a $10,000 reward for anyone who says they can contact the spirit of Houdini. Those who have tried, unsuccessfully, include Canadian television "medium" Kim Dennis, who had contacted the Houdini family claiming she was getting messages from Houdini.

== Traveling Houdini exhibit ==
Dietrich also sends out the world's only continuous traveling Houdini exhibit. Besides featuring it as part of her many shows, it has also traveled to corporations, banks, and casinos.

== Restoration and upkeep of the Houdini grave site ==
On September 27, 2011, a group she formed, that came to be known in the media as The Houdini Commandos, secretly replaced the statuary bust at Houdini's grave site: Machpelah Cemetery (Queens) that had been missing due to vandalism for 36 years. This was reported in a half-page story worldwide in The New York Times on October 24, 2011. Her world-famous attraction, Scranton's Houdini Museum that she runs with mystery entertainer Dick Brooks, has been asked by both the family of Houdini and the management of the Machpelah Cemetery (Queens) to take over the upkeep of the grave that has been in disarray for many years. In 2013 she petitioned The Society of American Magicians, magic's most prestigious and wealthiest organization, thanks to Houdini, to help take over the care of the grave site at Machpelah Cemetery (Queens), which they agreed to by unanimous vote. Dietrich commented on this, "I will not live forever, but The Society of American Magicians will!" Because of their work over the years, in 2016 Dietrich and Brooks were given the highest honor that can be bestowed on any magician: The Society of American Magicians rare Presidential Citation for their work in promoting the art of magic.

== Dietrich Uncovers Houdini's Long Lost Best Film "The Grim Game" ==
Long considered by film buffs as lost, Dietrich was aware since her teens that the only copy of Houdini's The Grim Game was buried in the apartment of Brooklyn collector Larry Weeks. She had seen it several times along with her partner Dick Brooks and attempted to acquire it from him several times to no avail. Finally with the help of film producer Rick Schmidlin she got him to turn it over to Turner Classic Movies and produce the restoration, who then put up the funding to have it professionally restored and commissioned two new movie scores to be added to the film. Turner flew Dietrich and Brooks to Hollywood to introduce the film as the climax to their week long yearly film festival. As part of the festival Turner asked Dorothy to perform a challenge strait jacket escape for which she got a standing ovation. Larry Weeks, who was ill and 96 years old, died about 5 months before the showing in March. As a tribute to Weeks she demonstrated a trick vest of Houdini's that she had acquired from Weeks as a teenager. Dietrich and Brooks are featured on the second title card of the restored film, which was shown on television the following October. "Because of our efforts more people and future magicians will now see Houdini's best work, than saw him in his entire lifetime!" said the two.

== Podcasts ==
- Open Sesame, Dick Brookz (a.k.a., Brooks) and Dorothy Dietrich discuss the legacy of Harry Houdini.
- Finding and restoring Houdini's 1919 Silent film, Houdini's The Grim Game-25:30.
- Dorothy Dietrich talks about being the only woman magician to do the Bullet Catch. Bonus podcast for the April 2016 SAM magazine cover story-18:32.
- Scott Wells Discusses Houdini-Opoly with Dick Brookz and Dorothy Dietrich.

== In popular culture ==
- In the novel The Art of Escaping by Erin Callahan, geared toward the Young Adult Market, 17-year-old Mattie has a secret obsession: escapology. She dreams of becoming the next Harry Houdini or Dorothy Dietrich. Mattie is hiding her obsession with Harry Houdini and Dorothy Dietrich from everyone
- Stories for Kids Who Dare to Be Different: True Tales of Amazing People Who Stood Up and Stood Out, by Ben Brooks. Hardcover.
- Dorothy Dietrich is mentioned on House MD, in a segment about her bullet catch. (Year 8, Segment 8, Perils of Paranoia). Wilson shows up in House's office with a gun he's found. House swears "it's not a gun. It's a prop. From Dorothy Dietrich's magic act. Look it up. She's the only woman to ever do the "Catch a Bullet" trick."
- Houdini: The World's First Superhero Collector Cards. Features Dietrich. Produced in 2012 by Frank Eachus Publishing. A few of the card sets made included a rare Dorothy Dietrich signed card. The preview set was part of limited printing (500 sets) to promote the full release of trading cards.

== Bibliography ==
- Twelve Have Died!, the story of the Bullet Catch
- The Guide to Magic As A Hobby by Bill Severn
- The Columbia Encyclopedia, 6th Edition, Columbia University Press, (2006)
- Feature article on women in magic. Bust Magazine, May 2008
- Magic: The Complete Course
- Feature All About Magicians article on Dorothy Dietrich.
- "Electric City" Cover Story 2012
- Glendale Life Cover Story Houdini Bust Replacement
- In the 2013 film Now You See Me, Isla Fisher plays an escape artist named Henley Reeves. In an interview she says, "I watched all of Houdini's work and Dorothy Dietrich, who is a female escapologist, who is amazing, you have to watch her." "I got to train with Dorothy Dietrich, the first lady magician to catch a bullet with her teeth. Fisher studied the life and work of illusionist Dorothy Dietrich to prepare for the role... Dorothy is a real female escapologist who is working today. She was the first woman to capture a bullet between her teeth, which is an amazing feat. She's not only good at misdirection, but she also connects emotionally with the audience, so she's better able to involve them in the stunts."
- MUM April 2016 Official Magazine of The Society of American Magicians. Cover and 8 page feature story.
- Women in American History: A Social, Political, and Cultural Encyclopedia, Peg A. Lamphier. Details Dietrich's contributions.
