= Dick Brooks (magician) =

United States magician and entertainer

- Born: New York City, New York, U.S.
- Other names: Ray Carter; Dick Brookz; John Bravo; Bravo The Great; Bravo The Grate!
- Occupations: magician, entertainer, writer
- Awards: Society of American Magicians Presidential Citation, United States Postal Service award for work on Houdini Stamp, 2002
- Website: http://www.MysteryEntertainer.com

Dick Brooks is a United States magician and entertainer. He began his career in show business at the age of 10, and since that time has worked in TV commercials, stand-up comedy, writing, children's entertainment, and army shows, and performed in night clubs, casinos, and magic venues. Focus Magazine described Brooks as a "magician of renown".

== Early years ==
As a teenager Brooks joined a magic club headed by the official magician of New York City, Abe Hurwitz (Peter Pan the Magic Man). When Hurwitz left the Peter Pan Magic Club, the club changed its name to Future American Magical Entertainers (F.A.M.E.) on Brooks's suggestion. This laid the foundation for the Society of American Magicians, who at first did not allow youngsters to join, but formed the Society of Young Magicians (S.Y.M.) for youngsters in 1984.

As a teenager, Brooks was booked by Skipper Dawes, who booked him as a regular performer doing commercials for Tootsie Rolls on the Paul Whiteman TV show Teen Club in Philadelphia. He traveled there alone at weekends, after getting the script by mail. He was eventually replaced by 23-year-old announcer Dick Clark. In 1972 Brooks appeared on The David Susskind Show about young comedians looking for a break in show business. When drafted into the army he was placed in Special Service, the entertainment branch of the military. After leaving the military he became a songwriter, writing dozens of songs including the track "Power House".

== The Magic Towne House ==
Brooks was the co-founder, with Dorothy Dietrich, of the Magic Towne House on the Upper East Side, which presented magic in New York City for over 15 years. Brooks and Dietrich resurrected Brother Theodore's career in the 1970s, booking him to do several seasons of midnight shows at The Magic Towne House, which led to a long series of TV and movie appearances. While at the Magic Towne House, Brooks established a 64-page magazine for magicians, Hocus Pocus Magazine, which ran for three years.

== Houdini-related projects ==
Wanting a larger facility and a place to house his collection of Houdini memorabilia, Brooks and Dietrich opened The Houdini Museum in Scranton, Pennsylvania.

For many years Brooks and Dietrich maintained Harry Houdini's abandoned grave. On September 27, 2011, along with escape artist Steve Moore, they restored the missing statuary bust at Houdini's grave site that was destroyed by vandals in 1975. The event was reported in The New York Times, who nicknamed them the Houdini Commandos. On September 13, 2014, David W. Bowers, president of the worldwide Society of American Magicians, issued Dick Brooks a Certificate of Appreciation for his work taking care of Houdini's grave.

Brooks has worked as a Houdini consultant for various media outlets including The Travel Channel, The New York Times, The London Times, Inside Magic, and The New York Daily News. He appeared on the Travel Channel show Magic Road Trip, which also aired on CBC.

In 2014 Brooks and Dietrich created a board game based on the Houdini Museum, named HoudiniOpoly, which took two years to develop. The project was funded by a Kickstarter campaign from early 2017, which raised over $14,000, with investors including John Cox of WildaboutHoudini.com, Joe Notaro of HarryHoudiniCircumstantialEvidence.com, and Dean Carnegie of TheMagicDetective.com, as well as the game being sanctioned and supported by The Society of American Magicians.

== Appearances ==
As well as a number of corporate and celebrity parties, Brooks has appeared on television on such shows as Atlantic City Alive, Travel Channel's Magic Road Trip, Biography Channel's Dead Famous-Houdini, Evening Magazine, Good Morning America, Home Box Office, Canada's Deals From The Dark Side, and twice as a special guest on Travel Channel's Mysteries At The Museum.

He is currently starring in Psychic Theater's production "HAUNTED! Mind Mysteries & THE Beyond!". The Fall 2008 issue of the Pennsylvania Tourism Office's magazine, Pennsylvania Pursuits, named Brooks' Psychic Theater as the 9th most haunted place in Pennsylvania.

Brooks has also worked as a magic consultant for the New York Shakespeare Festival, Woody Allen's "The Magic Light Bulb" at New York's City Center, and Radio City Music Hall. He has also interviewed celebrities such as Uri Geller, has written several books, and invented a number of magical effects.
