= Houdini Museum =

Biographical museum in Pennsylvania

The Houdini Museum
- Interactive map of The Houdini Museum
- Location: 1433 N. Main Avenue, Scranton, Pennsylvania, United States
- Coordinates: 41.43259°N 75.66304°W
- Opened: 1988
- Slogan: The Only Building in the World Dedicated to Houdini
- Website: Houdini.org

The Houdini Museum is located at Scranton, Pennsylvania. Harry Houdini appeared in Scranton and did several special challenges there. His brother, Hardeen, also appeared in Scranton and in its sister city, Wilkes-Barre. The longest engagement of Houdini's career was in this area of northeast Pennsylvania when he spent two full seasons with the Welsh Brothers Circus. Documents and letters attesting to this are on display in the museum's renovated 125-year-old building and on its website. Houdini performed at Sylvester Z. Poli's theater for in Scranton, which was part of the Keith-Albee-Orpheum circuit at the time. This would later become the RKO Pictures circuit.

The Houdini Tour, show, and museum attraction is a popular Scranton attraction. The museum features memorabilia, artifacts, mannequins and films of Houdini. The Houdini Tour includes a magic show. A tour and show takes about two and a half to three hours.

The live show at the museum includes two nationally known magicians, Dorothy Dietrich and Dick Brooks.

== History ==
The Houdini Museum was created by Dorothy Dietrich and Dick Brooks (aka John Bravo and Ray Carter) who began collecting in the 1970s. The exhibits include items from their personal collections as well as artifacts given to Brooks by his father, who saw Houdini perform. Elements of the collection were on display for 15 years at the Magic Towne House in New York City, from the 1970s to the 1980s, before the move to Scranton, Pennsylvania.

Also on display at the New York location was the Society of American Magicians replica of Houdini's bust at Houdini's grave site, an item that the Society could not store. They were placed there for safe keeping. On September 27, 2011, The Houdini Museum along with "Houdini Commandos" (Dorothy Dietrich, Dick Brooks, and Steve Moore) replaced the statuary Houdini bust that was destroyed by vandals and missing at the grave for 36 years with the permission of the administration of the cemetery and Houdini family members. This project was funded by the not-for-profit Houdini Museum at a cost of about $10,000. With the urging of The Houdini Museum, The Society of American Magicians now contributes yearly to the upkeep of the Houdini grave site. Maintenance is also performed and financed by Scranton's Houdini Museum, the administrators of the cemetery, and volunteers and donors.

== Other Houdini museums ==
- American Museum of Magic
- David Copperfield's International Museum and Library of the Conjuring Arts, which is closed to the public
- The History Museum at the Castle in Appleton, Wisconsin
- Houdini Museum of New York at Fantasma Magic
- The House of Houdini
- University of Texas Library, which houses Houdini ephemera and a large collection of Houdini letters and manuscripts

== See also ==
- List of magic museums
