= Fantasma Magic =

American magic-toys manufacturer

The Fantasma Magic company (also known as Fantasma Toys) was founded in December 2001 by Roger Dreyer and Mark Setteducati. Fantasma Magic is a manufacturer of magic tricks, magic sets, science-based toys and Rubik's items as well as other novelties. Fantasma Magic supplies magic tricks, specialty magic sets and other toys to retailers such as Costco, Toys R Us, Kmart, Walmart, Target and others.

The first iteration of the Fantasma company was formed by Roger Dreyer in 1987 as a manufacturer of holograms. This led to Fantasma manufacturing clocks and watches for Disney. In 1999, Foster Grant purchased the company.

In 2001, after a stint with Marvin's Magic, Dreyer partnered with Setteducati, an inventor and consultant with Tenyo and creator of Milton Bradley's Magic Works line, to form Fantasma Magic. In February 2003, Fantasma Magic became the exclusive magic supplier to the FAO Schwarz flagship store in New York City and remained their exclusive magic supplier until FAO Schwarz closed their flagship store in July 2015.

In spring of 2006, Fantasma Magic left their offices at the International Toy Center when it was revealed the center had been sold. Fantasma opened its first retail location on the corner of 7th Avenue and 33rd Street. The store featured magic tricks and sets from Fantasma Magic as well as amateur and professional magic effects from a variety of other manufacturers. The store also housed the first Houdini Museum of New York. The store and museum have since moved to 213 West 35th Street, Room 401, New York City.

As of 2010, Fantasma Magic reported profits of $950,000 on $10 million in sales. Fantasma Magic is the only magic manufacturer to receive the unpaid endorsement of the International Brotherhood of Magicians. Fantasma Magic has founded and sponsors their own I.B.M. Ring (Ring 257) in Las Vegas, Nevada.
