= John Milner (magician) =

English magician

- Born: John David Milner; 1948 (age 77–78); Stourbridge, West Midlands, UK
- Occupation: Magician
- Spouses: Sylvia; Kim
- Children: 2

John David Milner (born 1948) is an English magician and entertainer based in Stourbridge, West Midlands, UK. He has been active in magic since he was a child and is a member of the Inner Magic Circle with a gold star, the International Brotherhood of Magicians, and Equity (previously British Actors' Equity).

== Early life ==
John Milner was born in 1948 in Stourbridge, West Midlands, UK, the son of Gerald and Eva Milner. His father owned a greengrocer and competed in flower shows, specialising in gladioli and daffodils. Milner's interest in magic began at age four when an uncle gave him a David Nixon magic box for Christmas. He met Ken Brooke at a magic convention and later took a train from Stourbridge to London for lessons with Brooke. He competed in The Magic Circle's Young Magician of the Year Competition and reached the finals in both 1963 and 1965. Milner attended King Edward VI Grammar School after passing his eleven plus exams and was a classmate of Led Zeppelin lead singer Robert Plant. After leaving school, he worked at his father's grocery while also performing at local functions at Masonic and Rotary events, working men's clubs, and children's birthday parties on the side. Milner was a Queen's Scout and held an Explorer Belt, and is the nephew of former Stourbridge Mayor Horace Reginald "Steve" Stephens.

== Career ==
Milner became a full member of the Magic Circle at 18 and joined the British Actors' Equity. In the late 1960s and early 1970s, he performed at Mitchells & Butlers pubs on weeknights and placed second in an International Brotherhood of Magicians competition held in Margate in 1972. The following year, he married magician Sylvia and they began performing as a duo; they were one of a few married couples who were both professional magicians. He served as the vice chairman of the Wolverhampton branch of the British Actors' Equity in the mid-1970s before performing on Chandris Line's SS Ellinis cruise ship during the summer of 1977. By the 1980s, he was a full-time professional magician and had worked with well-known entertainers such as Ken Dodd, Danny La Rue, Tommy Steele, Bernard Manning, Frank Carson, and Leslie Crowther.

In 1981, Milner was invited by PM Margaret Thatcher to perform at 11 Downing Street. In 1982, he and Sylvia started performing their blindfold driving act at the Hagley Hall Motor Show in Stourbridge, initially with her behind the wheel before he took over. He met Paul Winchell and his dummy Gerry Mahoney at a children's show. They later performed at schools together as part of the Merlin Puppet Theatre. In March 1998, Milner became a member of the Inner Magic Circle with a gold star and was presented his certificate by David Berglas. In 1989, Milner challenged the British Actors' Equity after they denied his wife Kim membership, as she was not considered an integral part of the performance. In an interview with the Sunday Express, Milner said he believed he had a strong case "because he slices her in half during his act."

Milner and his mentee Tracie Hughes, who had experience in puppetry, formed Magical Solutions Limited, which hired out magicians to corporate events. In 2000, they purchased Classic Casinos. In 2001, they opened the House of Magic UK, which was outfitted to look like a traditional magic shop and within two years added a school for magicians. The store closed in 2018 after an increase in rent prices but magician David Pitt reopened it in 2021. Pitt had become interested in magic after visiting the shop as a child and was later mentored by Milner.

In 2007, England passed a smoking ban that prohibited smoking indoors, which affected Milner's ability to do one of his most popular tricks, the Lit Cigarette. He appealed to the Local Authorities Coordinating Body on Regulatory Services and in 2008 was granted permission to continue performing the trick within the Metropolitan Borough of Dudley.

In May 2011, Milner and his son James performed in front of Prince Edward, Earl of Wessex at a fundraising dinner for the Duke of Edinburgh's Award at Knowsley Hall. Throughout his career, Milner has invented illusions for corporate clients, including The Vanishing Microwave for Whirlpool. He has also mentored a number of young magicians, including Andrew O'Connor. Milner is a member of the International Brotherhood of Magicians.

In 2012, he published the book Live Respected, Die Regretted: Gerald Milner's War Letters to Eva from a Desert Rat, a compilation of his father Gerald's letters to Milner's wife Eva during his time in North Africa and Italy during World War II.

== Filmography ==
=== Films ===
- The Art of Tommy Cooper (2007)
- Magicians

=== Television ===
- Tom's Midnight Garden (1974) as Young Man in Boat
- The Canal Children (1976) as Legger/Conjuror
- Doctor Who (1977) as Theater Audience Member; uncredited, episode The Talons of Weng-Chiang Part Four
- The Leslie Crowther Show (1979)
- Crossroads
- The Jensen Code
- The Kids from 47A
- Boon
- Woof!
- Chancer
- Soldier Soldier
- The Barchester Chronicles
- Doctors
- This Week 1844
- The Incredible Robert Baldick
- He Said, She Said
- Thirty-Minute Theatre
- The Brothers
- The Pallisers
- Gangsters
- Z-Cars
- Angels
- All Creatures Great & Small
- New Faces
- Up for the Cup
- Pebble Mill Showcase
- Pebble Mill at One
- Saturday Show
- Opportunity Knocks
- Hartbeat
- Game for a Laugh
- The Telethon 1988
- Going Live!
- Get Fresh

== Personal life ==
Milner began campaigning for the Stourbridge Conservative Party, an affiliate of the UK's Conservative Party, as a child but "withdrew his membership [in 2016] after new laws were introduced requiring landlords check the immigration status of tenants." He is also anti-EU. Milner married his first wife, Sylvia, in 1973; together they have a son, Robert, born c. 1975. He and his second wife, Kim, also have a son; James was born c. 1991. James is also a magician.
