= History Museum at the Castle =

Museum in Appleton, Wisconsin

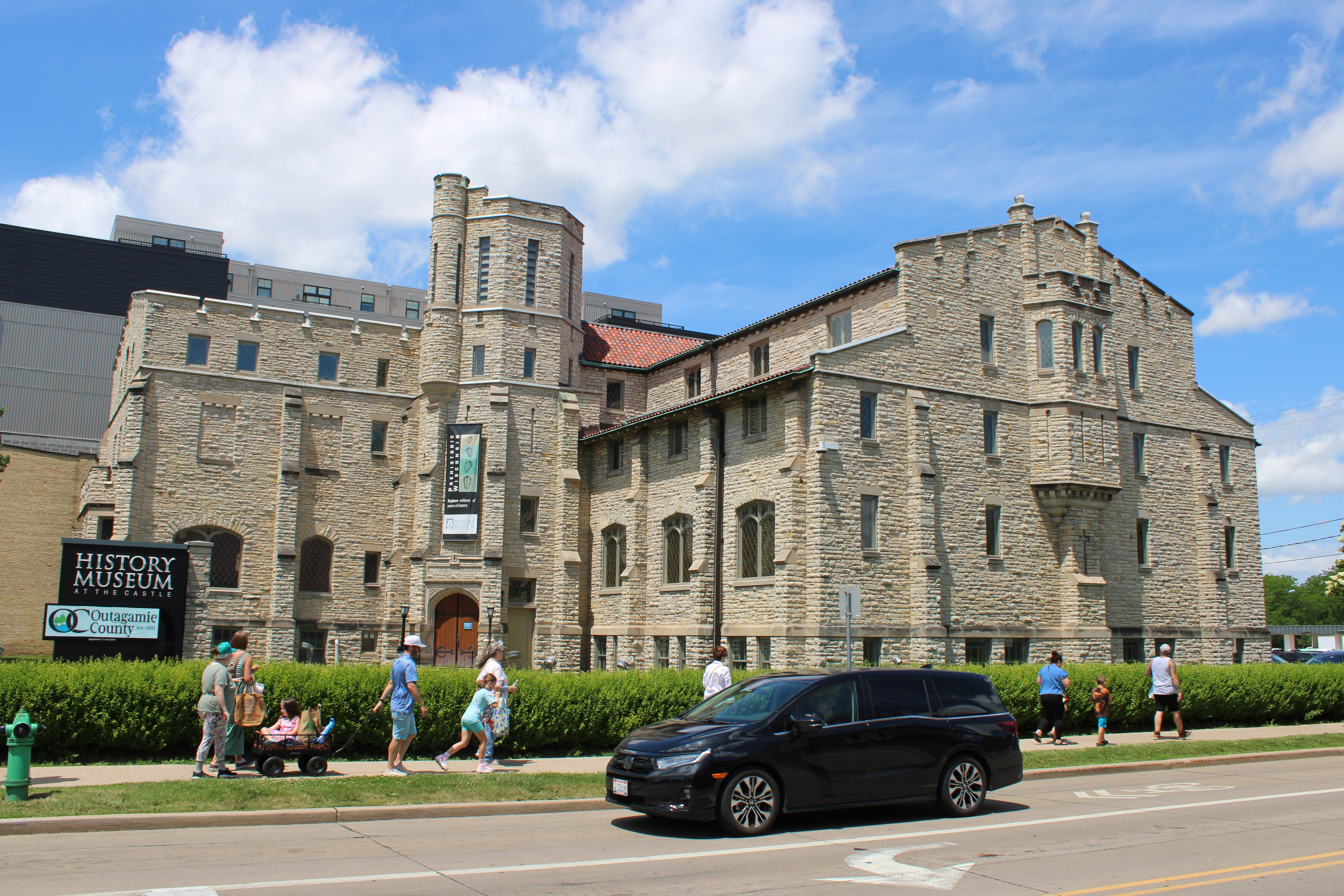
- The History Museum at the Castle
- Established: 1985
- Location: 333 East College Avenue, Appleton, Wisconsin
- Public transit access: Valley Transit
- Website: www.myhistorymuseum.org
- Masonic Temple
- U.S. National Register of Historic Places
- Coordinates: 44°15′44″N 88°24′5″W
- Built: 1923
- Architect: Leenhouts & Gutherie
- Architectural style: Tudor Revival
- NRHP reference No.: 85002330
- Added to NRHP: September 12, 1985

The History Museum at the Castle is a local history museum located in downtown Appleton, Wisconsin across College Avenue from Lawrence University. Owned and operated by the Outagamie County Historical Society (OCHS), the museum has previously operated under the names The Outagamie Museum and The Houdini Historic Center. The building was earlier known as Masonic Temple. The museum was a recipient of the 2018 National Medal for Museum and Library Service, the highest honor given to a museum or library in the United States.

== History ==
The building in which the museum is housed was formerly a Masonic temple, built in 1923, and is listed on the National Register of Historic Places as "Masonic Temple". Appleton's Waverly Masonic Lodge sold the building to the OCHS in 1985.

The museum's collections focus on the history of the Fox River Valley, containing artifacts from the 1840s onward. The History Museum at the Castle also has a large collection of original Harry Houdini personal documents and performance paraphernalia, including a selection of his picks, locks, keys, and handcuffs. The museum also holds a collection of artifacts from the life of Senator Joe McCarthy, who was from the Appleton area. The museum owns 35,000 photographs dating back as far as 1857, including ones of Houdini, McCarthy, and Edna Ferber.

== Other Houdini museums ==
- American Museum of Magic
- David Copperfield's International Museum and Library of the Conjuring Arts, which is closed to the public
- Houdini Museum (Scranton, Pennsylvania)
- The House of Houdini
- Harry Ransom Center at the University of Texas at Austin houses Houdini ephemera and a large collection of Houdini letters and manuscripts.
- Houdini Museum of New York

== See also ==
- List of magic museums
