= Musée des Automates =

Coordinates: 45.7562°N 4.8241°E

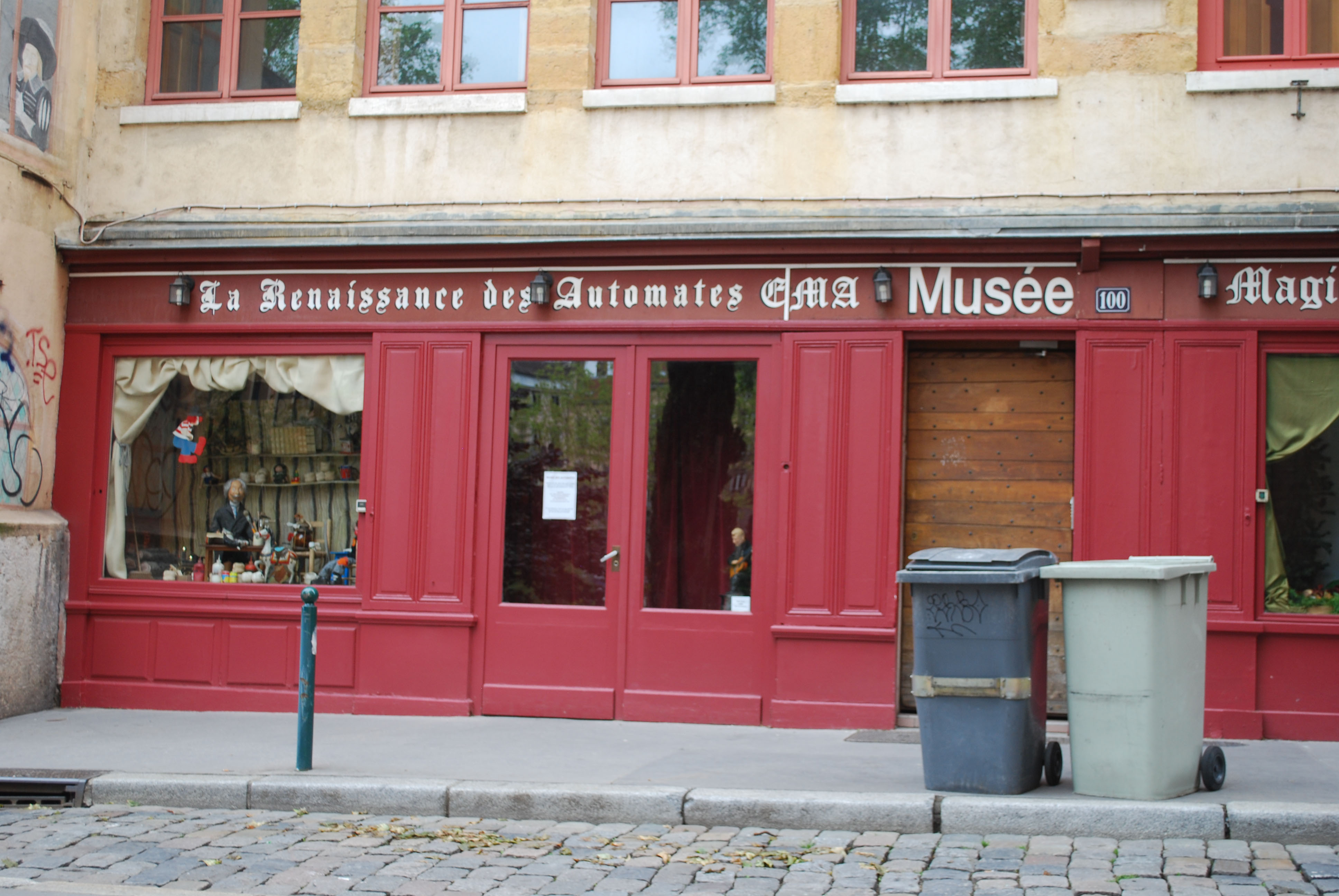
The museum

The Musée des Automates (French pronunciation: [myze dez‿ɔtɔmat], Automatons Museum) in Lyon, France, was a museum with a collection of 250 automatic puppets, all of them moving and made in the building's workshop. Seven rooms and 20 animated scenes reflected the heritage and tradition of Lyon. The museum closed in March 2022.

== See also ==
- List of museums in France
- Musee de la Magie of Paris — there is also a Musee des Automates co-located with this museum
