= John Milner (disambiguation) =

John Milner was an American baseball player.

John Milner may also refer to:

- John T. Milner (1826–1898), U.S. industrialist, railroad tycoon
- John Milner (nonjuror) (1628–1702), English clergyman
- John Milner (footballer) (born 1942), English former professional footballer
- John Milner (bishop) (1752–1826), English Roman Catholic bishop and writer
- John Milner (magician), British magician, stage and TV performer
- John Milner, a character in the 1973 film American Graffiti

== See also ==
- John Milnor (born 1931), American mathematician
- John Millner (born c. 1951), Illinois State Senator (2005-2013)
