= Marvin's Magic =

Producer and creator of magic products in the United Kingdom

Marvin's Magic Ltd
- Company type: Private
- Industry: Entertainment
- Founded: 1987; 39 years ago
- Founder: Marvin Berglas; Peter Marc Berglas; Amos Weinfeld
- Headquarters: London, UK
- Number of locations: Worldwide; Caesars Palace; Hamleys; Harrods; FAO Schwarz
- Key people: Carolyn Snell; Peter Marc Berglas
- Products: Magic Products
- Revenue: £10 Million (2008)
- Website: www.marvinsmagic.com

Marvin's Magic is a producer and creator of magic products in the United Kingdom.

It was founded in 1987 by award-winning magician and entrepreneur Marvin Berglas, son of David Berglas, and is the world's largest magic company.

The company operates in retail entertainment and in-store theatre and runs the magic departments in stores around the world including Hamleys and Harrods in London as well as FAO Schwarz in New York City and Caesars Palace on the Las Vegas Strip. It also employs a large team of professional demonstrator magicians and entertainers and have started the careers of many who have gone on to star on stage and screen.

Magic sets and products produced exclusively by Marvin's Magic include: Magic Made Easy, Mind-Blowing Magic, Simply Magic Collection, Marvin's Executive Magic, Marvin's Creative Magic, and The Ultimate Magic Collection. Marvin's Magic have also created the first and only tricks and magic sets ever to receive the official recommendation from the world-famous Magic Circle, who promote excellence in magic.

== History ==
Marvin's Magic has featured on over 80 million well-known fast-food and grocery packs including milk, eggs and cereal packets.

Marvin's in-house creative and product development magic team devise and compile each product under the direction of CEO Marvin Berglas. They also have alliances on occasions with creative magicians from around the world to produce innovative magic such as David Williamson with the Waccaroon, Michael Ammar - Card Secrets tutorial, Charlie Frye with Eccentrics, Professor Richard Wiseman with Quirkology, Bob Swadling original creator of The Energised Coin and The Great British Coin Trick and Freaky Body Illusions with Kevin James.
