= David Merlini =

Hungarian-Italian escape artist

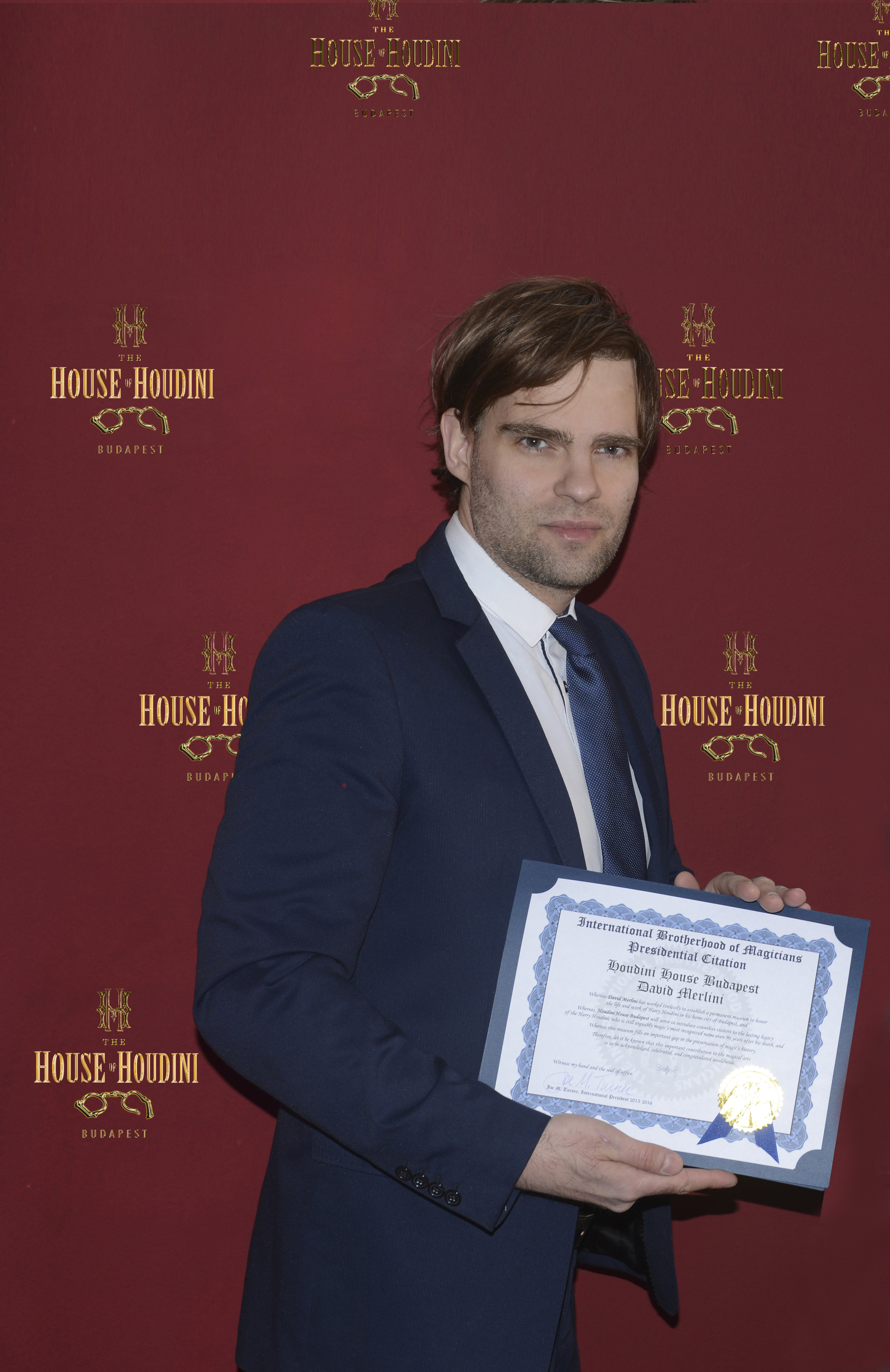
- David Merlini President - The House of Houdini Budapest
- Born: Budapest, Hungary
- Occupations: escape artist, Director
- Years active: 1993–present
- Children: No
- Website: www.merlini.com

David Merlini is a Hungarian-Italian escape artist, and World Record holder, described by Expo 2015 as the world's most famous escapologist, currently serving as Director of The House of Houdini, the only Houdini museum in Europe.

Merlini's signature performances had been broadcast live in some of the most relevant television networks worldwide.

== Early life and career ==
His mother is Hungarian and his father is Italian. He was raised in Italy, where he moved with his family from Hungary at the age of 4.

Around the age of 4, Merlini became interested in locks and handcuffs. As a child, he was given a magic trick, which founded his career. Around 13, Merlini attended night school at Turin's Circolo Amici della Magia, an illusionist school. When he was 17, he returned to Hungary, the country he regards as his homeland. Merlini cited Harry Houdini, who had also been born in Hungary, as a major source of inspiration.

== Milestones of his career ==
=== 1995 ===
At Sziget'95 (now called the Sziget Festival), Merlini was strapped in a straitjacket, and was tied to a flaming rope by his feet. His aim was to escape from the rope and descend 20 meters to the platform below with a safety line.

=== 1996 ===
Merlini was locked in a perforated steel box, after being chained and padlocked. The box was lowered into the Danube from the Chain Bridge.

=== 1997 ===
Attempts to recreate Houdini's famed Chinese Water Torture Cell, Handcuffed by five sets of regulation police handcuffs, locked with 60 pounds of chains, and padlocked in a metal cage, Merlini was lowered into a transparent tank of water, live at eurovision television programme Jeux Sans Frontieres.

=== 1998 ===
Handcuffed to the steering wheel of a Mercedes 500, doors are welded shut, the car is set on fire and lifted up to a height of 100 ft. before being released free fall.

=== 1999 ===
Strapped in a regulatory straitjacket on the main stage of Sziget Festival, he is lifted upside down several hundred feet in the air before proceeding to escape.

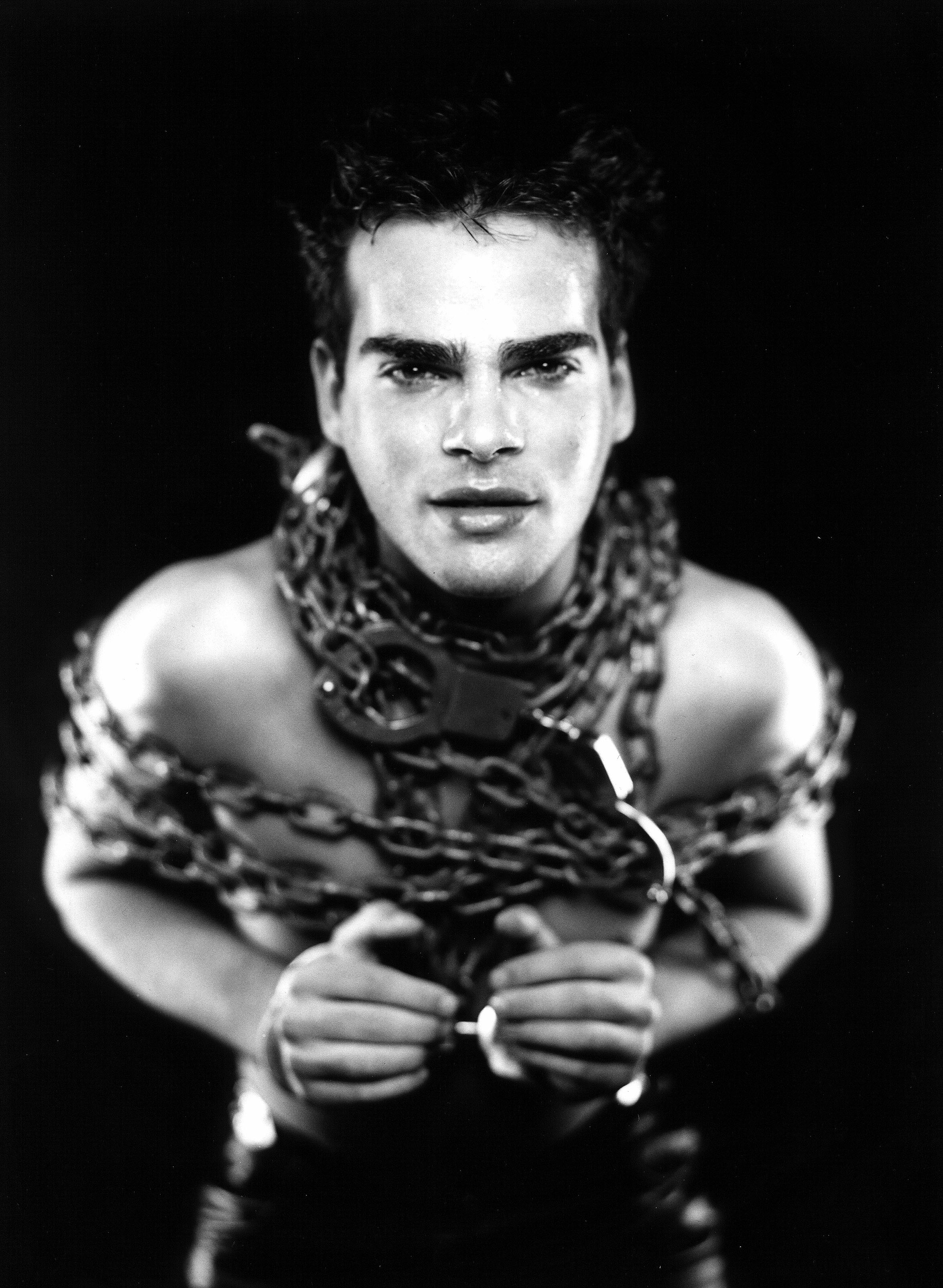
David Merlini in 1999

=== 2000 ===
Strapped in a special underwater straitjacket, Merlini's ankles are secured by handcuffs, padlocks and massive lead weights. He jumps into the giant transparent tank of water along with six tiger sharks, spending a total of 2 minutes and 30 seconds at a depth of 5 meters.

== The New Generation Performances ==
=== 2001 ===
The stunt named Hyberna sees Merlini strapped in a regulation straitjacket, welded in a steel-reinforced glass container filled with water, and set to freeze in a refrigeration cell on Heroe's Square, in Budapest. At the end of the 33-hour process, the one-ton ice block is melted with flamethrowers. The show is witnessed live by a crowd of more than 10,000 and on live television broadcast.

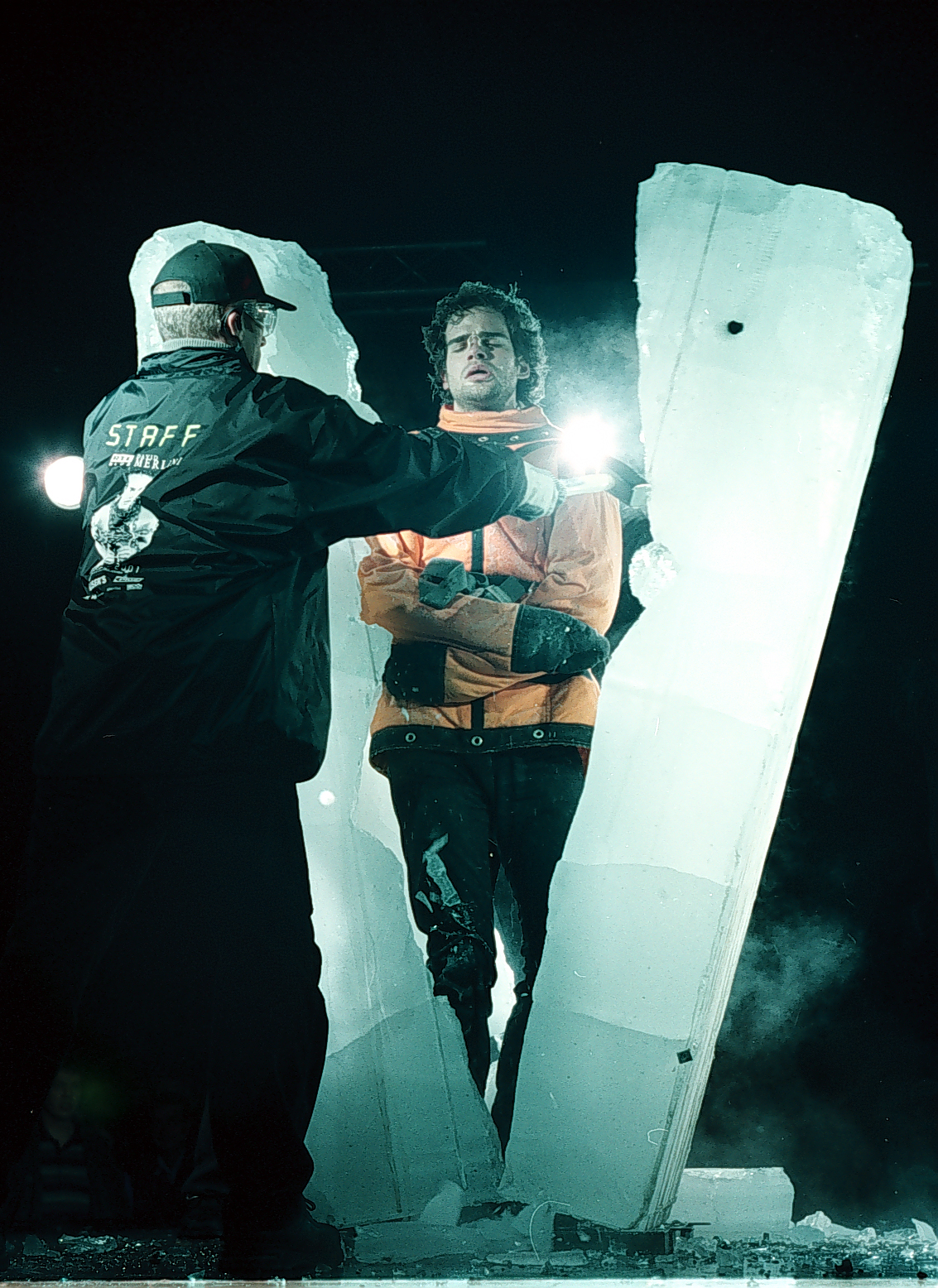
David Merlini frozen in a block of solid ice on Heroes Square, Budapest, Hungary, on the 29th of September 2001

=== 2002 ===
As part of a live segment for MTV show The Fridge. Strapped in a regulation straitjacket, his ankles are padlocked and handcuffed to lead weights, before jumping in the Baltic Sea in --Karlskrona, Sweden.

=== 2003 ===
Handcuffed to a metal cross, Merlini is lowered upside down in a tank of water set on fire, as part of a segment for MTV show The Fridge.

=== 2004 ===
As part of the performance named "The Breakthrough", viewed by two million people on live television, and a large crowd on the banks of the river, Merlini was buried up to his neck in 3.5 tons of freshly set concrete after which the concrete cube was lowered by crane to the bottom of the Danube river.

=== 2005 ===
Merlini is locked in a capsule on top of the largest non governmental, non military missile ever built, and launched to an altitude of 6,000 feet from the Shipyard Island (Hajógyári Island), as part of the stunt named The Countdown, witnessed live by a crowd of thousands, and broadcast live by Viasat.

=== 2006 ===
Publishes his first autobiographical book titled "Szabadíts ki!' (Free me!)

=== 2007 ===
Merlini received the "Best Escape Artist" award at the 2007 World Magic Awards in Los Angeles.

=== 2008 ===
Merlini set the breath-holding world record in Cannes, France, at the annual trade show MIPCOM after holding his breath for 20 minutes and 39 seconds. He received a certificate from Guinness World Records for "The record for the longest time that someone has held their breath underwater".

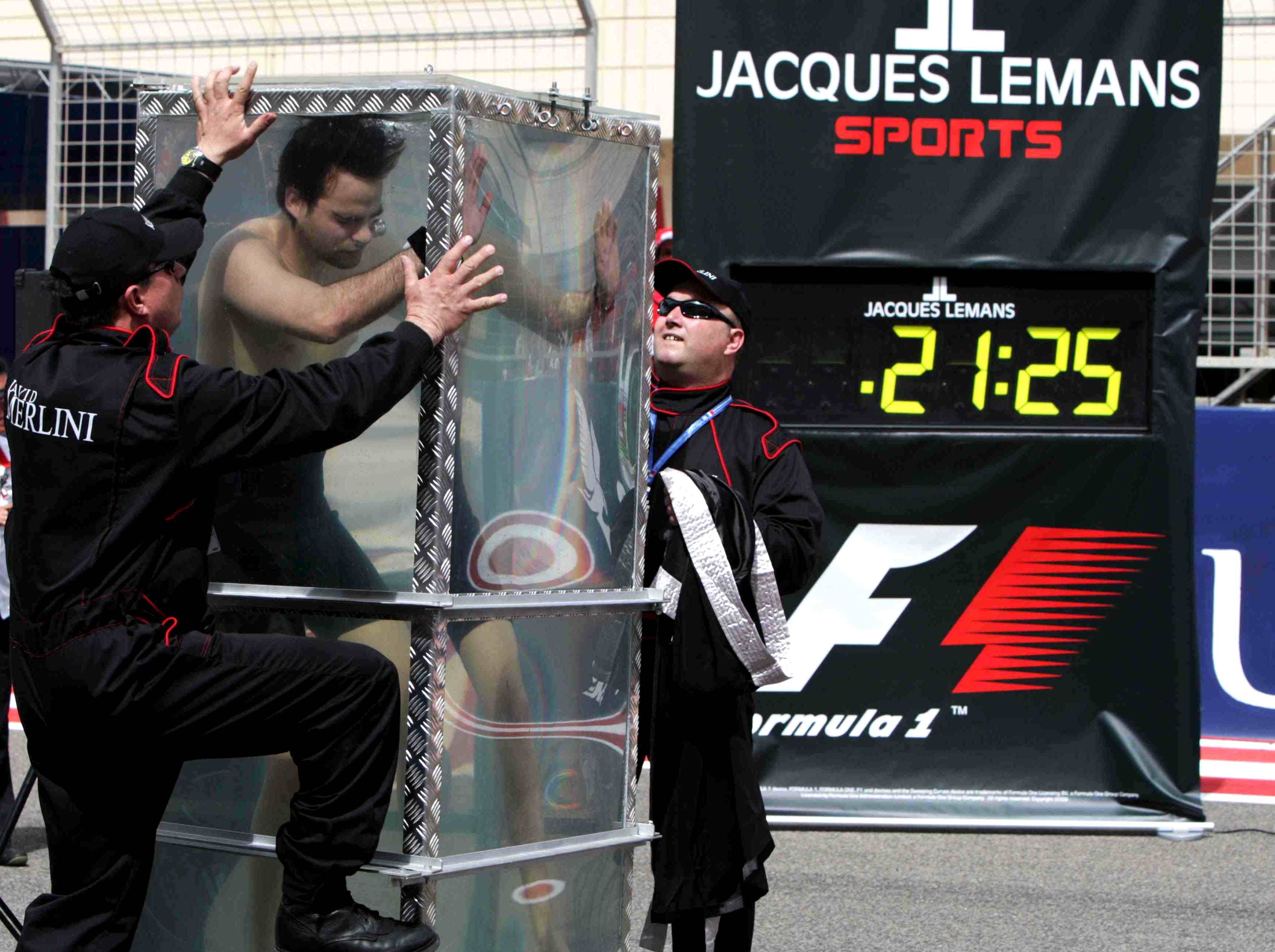
David Merlini (HUN) breaks his own record for holding breath underwater with a time of 21 minutes and 29 seconds. Formula One World Championship, Rd 4, Bahrain Grand Prix, Race Day, Bahrain International Circuit, Sakhir, Bahrain, Sunday 26 April 2009. Photo courtesy of Sutton Images

=== 2009 ===
Breaks the world record for the longest time underwater on the starting grid of the Formula 1 World Championship in Bahrain, before the start of the race. The event was covered live worldwide. The new world record stands at 21 minutes and 29 seconds.

=== 2010 ===
Merlini is on tour. Performing at 17 different venues, presenting his signature escapes.

=== 2011 ===
Breaks the breath-holding world record in Baofeng Lake, Hunan, China.

=== 2012 ===
Plays chess upside down with chess World Champion Susan Polgár, after successfully escaping a regulation straitjacket.

=== 2013 ===
Merlini consulted for the Houdini miniseries as a magical and escape advisor, training actor Adrien Brody, who played the role of Houdini, how to escape from handcuffs while holding his breath.

=== 2014 ===
Merlini was set on fire during his "Witch trial" stunt. Tied at the stake with ropes and soaked with flammable material, he had to escape before the protective coating on his skin volatilized.

=== 2015 ===
Merlini presented "Houdini in Milano", a live theatrical show featuring real escapes, for the closing ceremony of Expo 2015 at the Auditorium in Milan, Italy.

=== 2016 ===
Merlini opened The House of Houdini, presenting the largest permanent collection of original Houdini artifacts in Europe. Its artifacts were previewed at Budapest's National Széchényi Library. The museum's collection includes original Houdini memorabilia: e.g., handcuffs, personal correspondence, and "precious artifacts." A bible one owned by Houdini is part of the collection. It also includes original props from the latest "HOUDINI" film – Oxygen (1999), which featured Adrien Brody, an Oscar winner, and the later miniseries.

== Accidents and injuries ==
In 2008, during a World Record attempt in Cannes, France, Merlini's assistants smashed the giant water tank in order to rescue him, resulting in an injured arm caused by broken glass.

In 2014, he presented Hyberna, the ice escape in Italy, on Canale 5. During the escape, the 1-ton ice block breaks, causing a fracture of Merlini's tibia and fibula. Merlini calmly thanks the audience for their support before being rushed to the hospital. Few weeks later, he performs a new underwater escape, the "upper body escape", where only his head and torso are submerged underwater, due to the cast on his leg.
