= The House of Houdini =

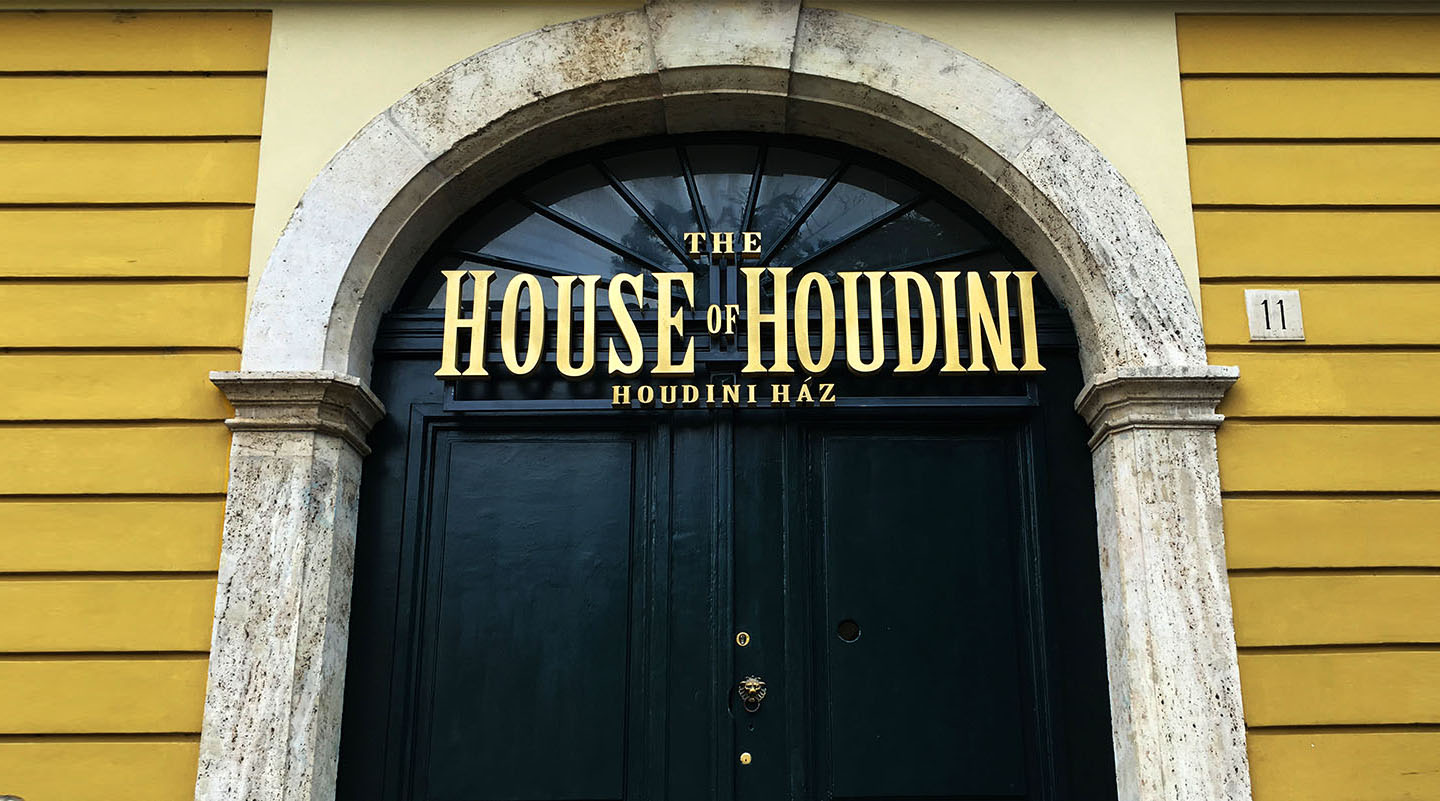
- The House of Houdini

- Location within Hungary
- Location: 11, Dísz Square, Budapest

History
- Founder: David Merlini
- Built: 1500

Site notes
- Architectural style: neobaroque

The House of Houdini is a private exhibit and performance venue located at 11, Dísz Square, within the walls of the Buda Castle in Budapest, Hungary. The building houses the only collection of original Houdini artifacts in Europe.

== History ==
The owners' private collection includes original Houdini memorabilia: e.g., handcuffs, personal correspondence, and "precious artifacts." A Bible once owned by Houdini is part of the collection. It also includes original props from the Houdini film – Oxygen (1999), which featured Adrien Brody, an Oscar winner, and the later miniseries. The facility opened on June 16, 2016.

Budapest was selected as the location of the premises as Houdini was born in the city. (Note: "Visitors can enter The House anytime during operating hours, but admission to The Show and Collection is only open to guests that can solve the "Entrance Arcane". You read that correctly, entrance to the magic area is possible only after successfully decoding the secret message on the ticket. If a visitor fails to decode the message, the secret passage will not appear and The House of Houdini will refund the ticket. Of course, the staff is always happy to provide helpful hints to solve the secret.")

The owner is David Merlini, an escapologist who served as technical advisor on the Houdini miniseries. (Note: "David joins a small and prestigious fraternity of magicians that includes Dunninger (advisor on Houdini (1953)), Harry Blackstone Jr. (The Great Houdinis), and Jim Bentley (Houdini, 1998).") Its artifacts were previewed at Budapest's National Széchényi Library. Joe M. Turner (Note: Turner is an American magician, mentalist, and professional speaker. Based in Atlanta, he is widely respected as a leader in the field of corporate magic as well as an authority on the process of customizing magic performances, keynotes and seminars for trade shows, product launches, and other marketing efforts, conferences, or corporate events. He was erroneously reported to be "IBM President".) exchanged commemorative plaques with Merlini at the then proposed site of exhibit on Houdini's birthday. This followed an earlier exhibition in Milan, Italy.

The venue is also a center for research into Houdini's life, highlighting his Hungarian and Jewish origin. Notwithstanding his Hungarian birth, Houdini never performed in Hungary.

Six magicians rotate performance in the "Orpheum" the in house small theater.

== Admission ==
As of September 2023, admission is 3,600 forints for adults and 2,400 forints for children under age 11. English and Hungarian language shows are available. Visitor entrance can only be gained through decoding a secret "arcane" message; if the visitor fails to solve it, they refund the price of admission

== Awards ==
The House of Houdini has been jointly recognized as a world magic heritage institution by the National President of the Society of American Magicians and the International President of the International Brotherhood of Magicians.

== Confusing names and claims ==
This "house" should not be confused with the "House of Houdini" which was a former Houdini home, purchased in 1908, at 278 West 113th Street, Harlem, now called Morningside Heights, New York City that also displays artifacts.

Likewise, in 1919 he rented the cottage at 2435 Laurel Canyon Boulevard in Los Angeles, (Note: "Not the home, which was sensationally dubbed "the Houdini mansion" when it burned in 1959, and has been rebuilt using the name "Houdini Estate.") while making movies for Lasky Pictures. His wife occupied it for a time after his death. As of 2011 the site of the cottage was a vacant lot and up for sale. The main mansion building itself was rebuilt after it was destroyed in the 1959 Laurel Canyon fire, and is now a historic venue called The Mansion. While Houdini did not likely live at the "mansion," there is some probability that his widow did.

== Acquisition rumors ==
News reports in the preceding months had raised the suspicion that the majority stake of the company and its assets were to be purchased by Centurion, a US based capital fund for $18.6M. The offer was reportedly turned down by the owner David Merlini.

== The Houdini Commemorative Stamp ==
In celebration of the 150th anniversary of the birth of Harry Houdini, the Hungarian Post announced the release of the Houdini Commemorative Stamp. This limited-edition stamp was issued on November 29, 2024.

== Other Houdini museums ==
- American Museum of Magic
- David Copperfield's International Museum and Library of the Conjuring Arts, which is closed to the public
- The History Museum at the Castle (Appleton Wisconsin)
- Houdini Museum (Scranton, Pennsylvania)
- Houdini Museum of New York
- University of Texas Library houses Houdini ephemera and a large collection of Houdini letters and manuscripts.

== See also ==
- List of magic museums
