= List of magic museums =

There are more than two dozen notable museums concerning illusionary magic and its associated magicians and magical apparatus, and all but two are publicly accessible.

== Permanent museums ==
=== North America ===
- 278 West 113th Street, New York City, New York. (Note: Not per se a "museum", but it is a private residence with a documented Houdini connection and a lot of his artifacts. It has occasionally been open for guided tours. Not to be confused with the "House of Houdini", this is a former Houdini home, purchased in 1908, at 278 West 113th Street, Harlem, now called Morningside Heights, New York City that also displays Houdini artifacts.)
- American Museum of Magic, Marshall, Michigan is the largest magic museum in the United States open to the public.
- The History Museum at the Castle is a local history museum located at 330 East College Avenue in downtown Appleton, Wisconsin. Owned and operated by the Outagamie County Historical Society (OCHS), the museum has previously operated under the names The Outagamie Museum and The Houdini Historic Center.
- The Houdini Museum, 1433 North Main Avenue, Scranton, Pennsylvania. It features memorabilia, artifacts, mannequins and films of the master magician. The Houdini Tour also includes a magic show as part of the tour.
- Houdini Museum of New York At Fantasma Magic
- David Copperfield's International Museum and Library of the Conjuring Arts, which is closed to the public, but available to researchers. It claims to be the largest collection of magic artifacts (80,000 items), notwithstanding the American Museum of Magic. It began in 1991 when Copperfield, who had acquired the Cole Collection, purchased the Mulholland Library of Conjuring and the Allied Arts, which contained the world's largest collection of Houdini memorabilia.
- Martinka & Co. Museum of Magic, 85 Godwin Avenue, Midland Park, New Jersey 07432.
- Marvin's Marvelous Mechanical Museum 31005 Orchard Lake Road, Farmington Hills, Michigan
- Museum of Illusions, Toronto, Ontario, Canada.
- Smithsonian Institution, F Street Northwest, Washington, DC. In 1985, on the 100th anniversary of his father's birth, Harry Blackstone, Jr. donated to the Smithsonian Institution in Washington D.C. the original floating light bulb – Thomas Edison designed and built it – and the original Casadega Cabinet, used in the "Dancing Handkerchief" illusion by his father, Harry Blackstone. This was the first ever donation accepted by the Smithsonian in the field of magic.
- Society of American Magicians Hall of Fame and Magic Museum, Los Angeles, CA. Museum in storage, seeking new location. Long out of view, the artifacts went on exhibit at the Whittier Museum for six months beginning in September 2012.

=== Europe ===
==== France ====
- La Maison de la Magie Robert-Houdin (the house of Magician Jean Eugène Robert-Houdin) fronting on the Royal Château de Blois, 1, Place du Château Blois 41000 “The museum displays automatons from the 19th century." As a museum of France and bearing the official label of "Musée de France", it is the only public museum in France which incorporates in one place collections of magic and a site for permanent performing arts.
- Musée de la Magie in Paris, France is underneath the 16th century house of the Marquis de Sade with exhibits in the cellars.
- Musée de la Curiosité et de l'Insolite, 39 Beaumont, 06100 Nice, France

==== Germany ====
- Museum Bellachini, Hansaplatz 8, 20099 Hamburg, shows the collection of Wittus Witt. It is Germany's only magic museum with regular opening hours to the public; from Thursday to Sunday, 11.00 am to 6.00 pm with regular shows on Friday night at 9:00 pm.

==== Spain ====
- King of Magic Museum, Carrer Jonqueres, 15 08003, Barcelona, Spain. An extension of a shop that opened in 1881, exhibits include pictures and memorabilia associated with illusionists, including Carlston, Fu-Li-Chang, and Horace Goldin.
- Museo Fournier de Naipes, Calle Cuchillería 54, Vitoria-Gasteiz, Spain
- Museo del Naipe, Carrer de l'Hospital, 1, Oropesa del Mar, Spain
- Teatro Museo El Rei de la Màgia, Carrer de les Jonqueres 15, 08003 Barcelona, Spain The King of Magic Museum is one of the oldest establishments in the world dedicated exclusively to sale, manufacture and teaching of illusions. In 1881 it was opened by Partagas Catalan Joaquim. In celebration of its 130th anniversary, it expanded to include a theater museum dedicated to the art of sleight of hand and the study and dissemination of illusionism. History and art, nineteenth century ephemera including hand games, posters, photographs of premier magicians, books, pictures, etc. are exhibited. Exhibitions illustrate the history, evolution of magic and its influence on Spain long before "the arrival of Harry Potter to our lives." Magic shows will include important illusionists such as Micky Conesa and Xavier Giro, winner of the 2010 Merlin Award (The ' Oscar of Magic ).
- Casa Museo de la Magia from "Magics Bufons". Located in Polinyà de Xuquer, Valencia. It exhibits many posters, magic objects and other curiosities, such as two pairs of "dressed fleas" or the Venus de Milo carved from a grain of rice. It has two small theaters of magic, which all offer weekend shows. They also have a magic shop.

==== Central and Eastern Europe ====
- The House of Houdini is a museum and performance venue located at 11, Dísz square in the Buda Castle in Budapest, Hungary, which claims to possess the largest Houdini collection in Europe. It should not be confused with the various houses owned by Houdini. In 1919 Houdini rented the cottage (Note: "Not the home, which was sensationally dubbed "the Houdini mansion" when it burned in 1959, and has been rebuilt using the name "Houdini Estate.") at 2435 Laurel Canyon Boulevard in Los Angeles, while making movies for Lasky Pictures. His wife occupied it for a time after his death. As of 2011 the site of the cottage was a vacant lot and up for sale. The main mansion building itself was rebuilt after it was destroyed in the 1959 Laurel Canyon fire, and is now a historic venue and called The Mansion. While Houdini did not likely live at the "mansion," there is some probability that his widow did.
- Magic Castle, Sofia, Bulgaria, opening May 2014.
- Magic Museum, Fruška Gora National Park, Serbia, containing "the largest collection in the Balkans on the history of magic art."
- Rossy Magic Museum, in the Balkans. Founded in 2001, it features the collection of "the late great magician and collector Dezider Repovic." It includes 20.000 articles, 3.000 magic and magician books, including the first Serbian language book about magic. Svetozar F. Ognjanovic, Novi Sad. Magician.
- Zauberkasten-Museum Schönbrunner Straße 262, Im Hofe, Wien 12, next to Schönbrunn Palace, Vienna, Austria. The largest magic set collection in the world, with nearly 3000 different magic sets, all from the collections of Manfred Klaghofer. Some sets date back to the 19th century. The museum is a work-in-progress, stemming from his first collection in the 1995, and he continues to acquire new sets (some costing thousands of dollars) at the rate of two or three per week. He is listed in the Guinness Book of World Records.

==== Northern Europe ====
- The Magic Circle Museum, at the Centre for the Magic Arts, the Headquarters of The Magic Circle, 12 Stephenson Way, London
- Davenport's Magic Kingdom in Norfolk, England, houses an exhibition on the history of magic as well as a live conjuring show and a recreated sideshow act.
- Museum for Magic and Illusions is at Rue de Namur 49, Brussels, Belgium.
- Norwegian Museum of Magic founded in 1997 as the "Norwegian Magician Archives", concentrating on Norwegian magicians. Oslo, Norway.
- Sveriges Magi-Arkiv is run by magician Christer Nilsson (stage name Christer el Ricco) in Nyköping, Sweden, and is the country's only magic museum.

==== Italy ====
- Museo della Magia, Cherasco (CN), Italy
- Museo Nazionale della Magia, Cagliari, Italy

=== Elsewhere ===
- Australian Museum of Magical Arts is in Sydney
- College of Magic has its Magical Arts Centre in Cape Town, South Africa It is currently resident in its own premises situated on Lansdowne Road in Claremont Cape Town. These premises were officially opened as the "Magical Arts Centre" (MAC) on 24 February 1995 by the then Department of Arts, Culture, Science and Technology. It houses an extensive collection of stage illusions, magical props and costumes.
- Museu de Arte Mágica e Ilusionismo João Peixoto dos Santos (João Peixoto dos Santos Magical Arts and Illusionism Museum), Rua Silva Bueno 519 (conjunto 42), Ipiranga, BrasiSão Paulo, Brazil.
- Museum of Illusions a franchise of museums that host a variety of exhibits of optical and other types of illusions. As of May 2023, the franchise consists of 43 museums in 25 countries. The first museum in the franchise was opened in 2015 in ZagrebCroatia. The franchise is operated by Metamorfoza d.o.o., which is, as of 2021, majority-owned by Invera Equity Partners.

== Closed museums ==
- Houdini Magical Hall of Fame, Niagara Falls, Ontario, Canada. Opened in May 1968 at 5019 Centre St., moved to 4983 Clifton Hill (Niagara Falls) in 1972, closed due to fire on April 30, 1995. Housed many significant items from Harry Houdini's personal collection, including a multitude of handcuffs and leg irons, a milk can escape, a wooden packing crate he used for underwater escapes, and the famed Chinese Water Torture Cell. Owned by Henry Muller, Vince Delorenzo, and partners.
- Houdini Museum, Las Vegas, started out at the Venetian, then at Caesars Palace in Las Vegas Valley
- Magic and Movie Hall of Fame, 3555 Las Vegas Blvd. South, Las Vegas Valley which included exhibits on "local acts" Lance Burton, Siegfried & Roy and David Copperfield.
- Ray Goulet's Mini Museum of Magic, 137 Spring Street, Watertown, Massachusetts
- Le Grand David and His Spectacular Magic Company at the Larcom Theatre 13 Wallis Street in Beverly, Massachusetts had three galleries of exhibits, and was also the site of the longest continuously running magic show in the world.

== Temporary exhibitions ==
- Before the Magic Towne House in New York City closed, some of Harry Houdini's artifacts were displayed there for thirteen years.
- Houdini: Art and Magic is an exhibition of Houdini paraphernalia and art inspired by him at Manhattan's Jewish Museum. The show closed in New York on March 27, 2011, and was then displayed in Los Angeles, San Francisco and Madison, Wisconsin.
- In 2010, fifteen museums in Singapore cooperated in hosting itinerant magic shows over the entire year.
- The Wellcome Collection in London hosted Smoke and Mirrors: The Psychology of Magic in 2019, exploring the scientific links between magic and psychology.
