= Pinoli's Restaurant =

Italian restaurant in Soho

Coordinates: 51.5111°N 0.1318°W

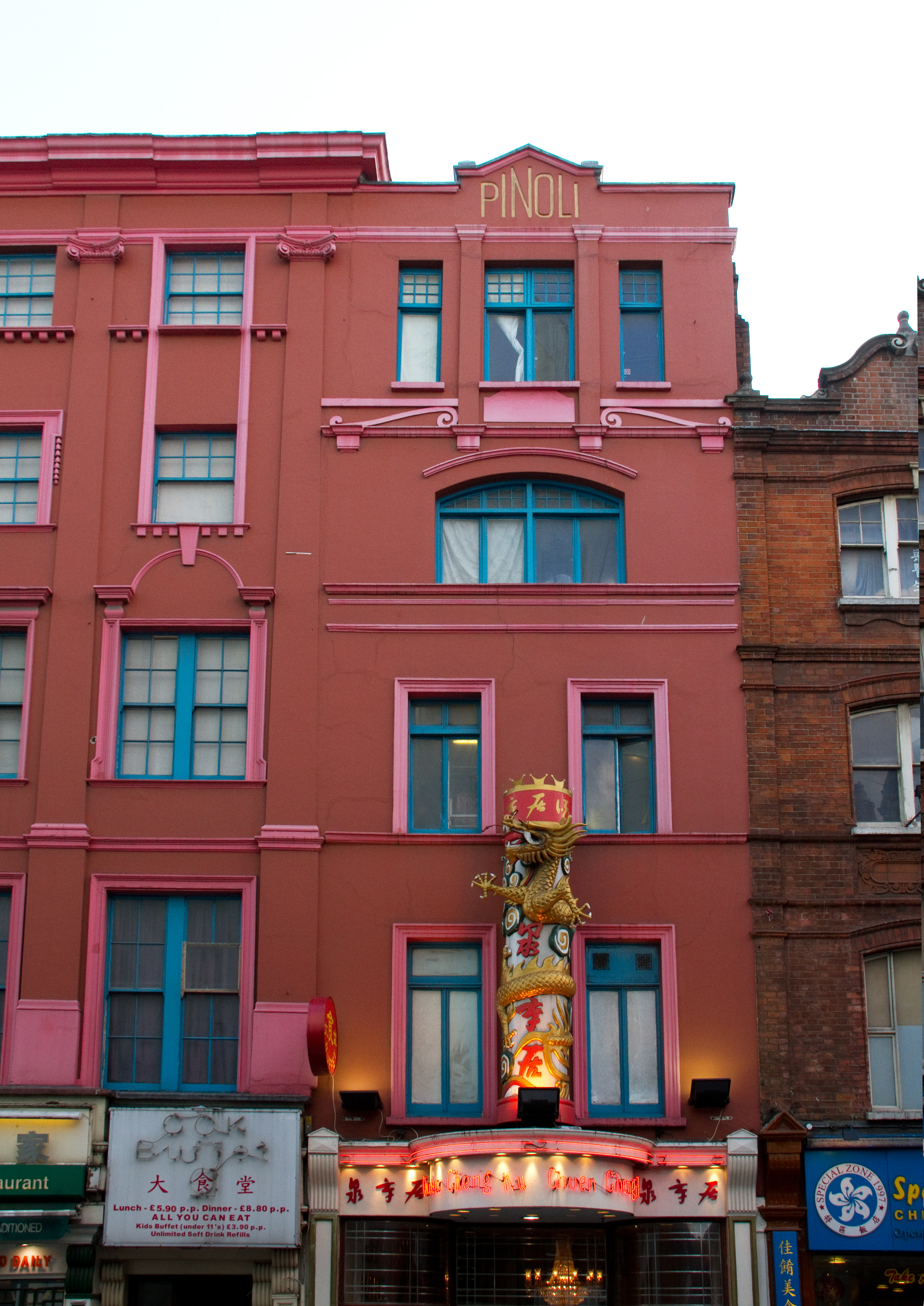
- Façade of 17 Wardour Street, photographed in 2011, showing the word "Pinoli" still visible at its top
- Interactive map of Pinoli's Restaurant

Restaurant information
- Established: 1890s
- Closed: 1949
- Location: London, United Kingdom

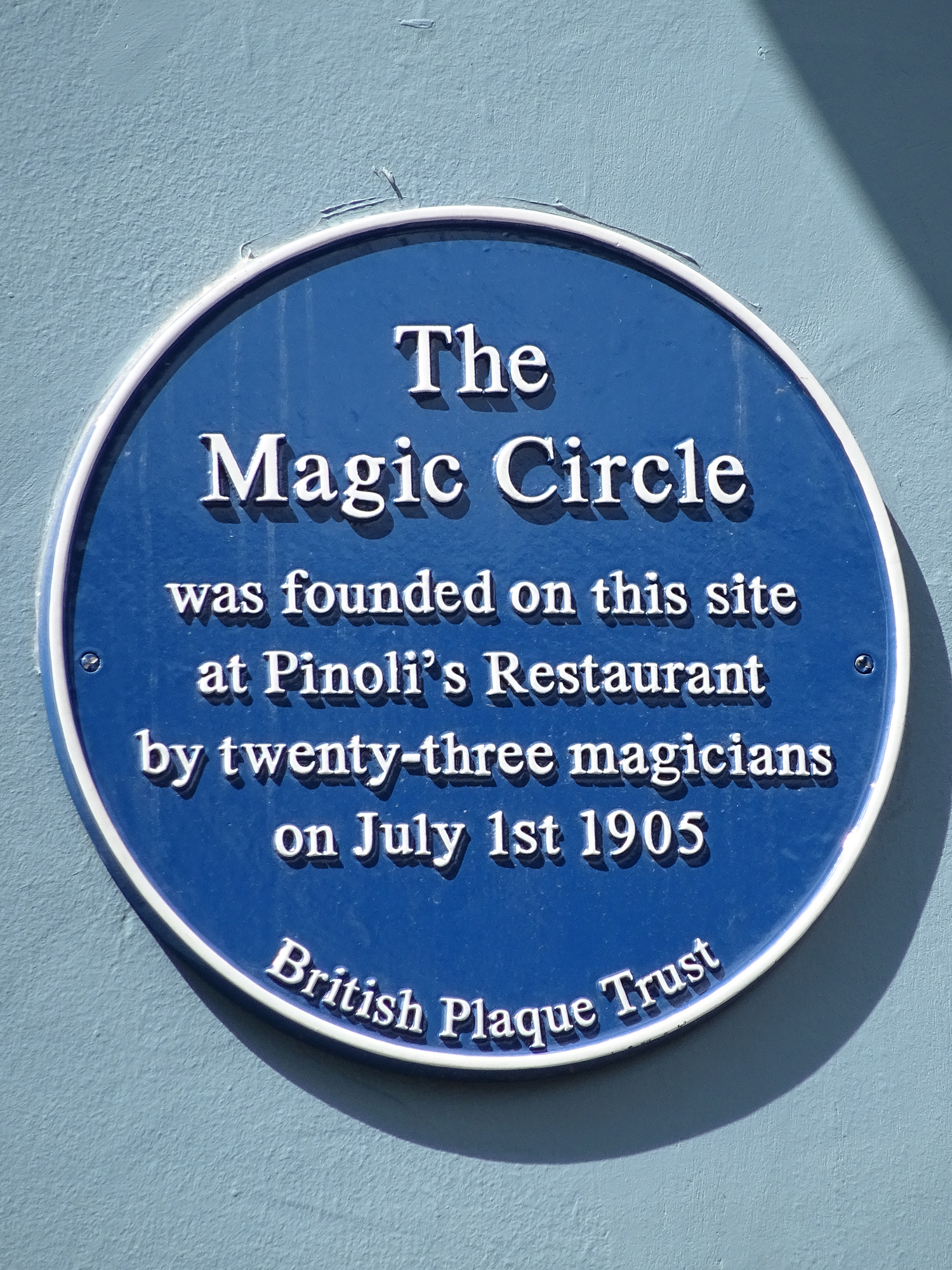
Blue Plaque at former site of Pinoli's Restaurant, photographed in 2016

Pinoli's Italian Restaurant was an Italian restaurant owned by Carlo Pinoli at 17 Wardour Street in what was then the Little Italy area of London's Soho district, with another frontage on Rupert Street. It was founded in the 1890s.

Pinoli's was known for good food at low prices, and was popular with celebrities, journalists and politicians.

The Magic Circle was founded in Pinoli's in 1905. There is now a blue plaque to celebrate the occasion.

Pinoli became a British citizen in 1906, and died in 1927. He is buried in Brompton Cemetery. Pinoli's closed in 1949.

The location of Pinoli's restaurant is now part of London's Chinatown. The name 'Pinoli' is still visible at the top of the building frontage in Wardour Street.
