= Todd Landman =

Todd Landman is a professor of political science and Pro-Vice Chancellor at the University of Nottingham. He is also an academic magician, specializing in mentalism, a member of The Magic Circle, and Visiting Professor of Performance Magic at the University of Huddersfield.

== Works ==
- Landman, Todd (2013). Human Rights and Democracy - The Precarious Triumph of Ideals. Bloomsbury Academic. doi:10.5040/9781472544643. ISBN 978-1-84966-346-5.
