= Jay & Joss =

English illusionists and entertainers

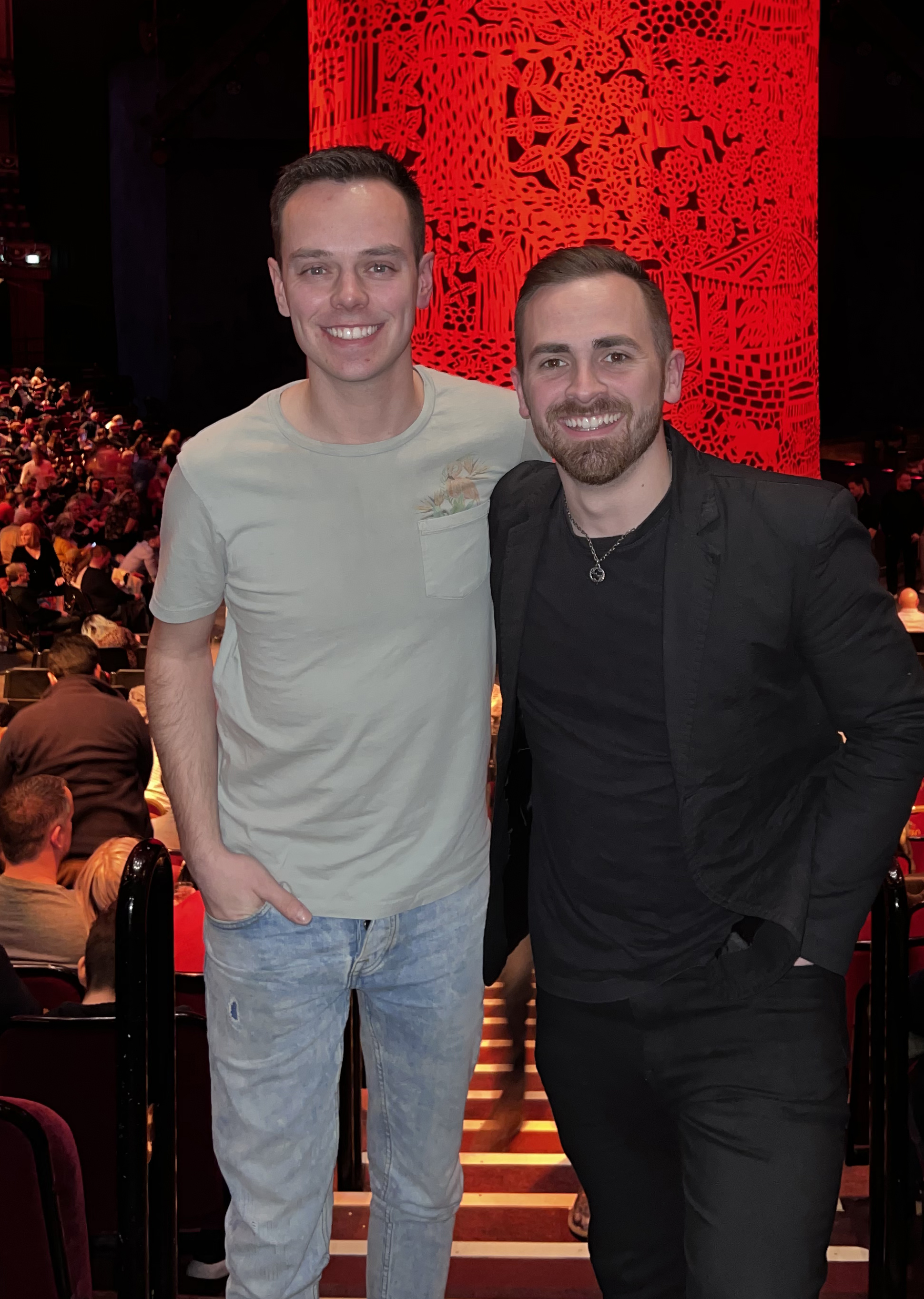
- Jamie Docherty (left) and Lewis Joss (right) at the Royal Albert Hall in 2022
- Born: Jamie Docherty; September 19, 1994 (age 32) Lewis Joss; December 27, 1995 (age 30)
- Occupations: Magicians, entertainers
- Years active: 2012–present
- Known for: Magic
- Website: jayandjoss.co.uk

Jay & Joss (Jamie Docherty and Lewis Joss) are a UK contemporary magic and illusionist couple who also work as illusion consultants. Currently touring their theatre show 'It's Not a Game', their act is known for using lasers, projections & fire, as well as dangerous stunts with blades & spikes. They met at the world's largest magic convention, got engaged in 2019 and further got married in 2023. Jay & Joss have appeared on Britain's Got Talent, BBC Three, Channel 4, Penn & Teller's Fool Us and Radio X's Chris Moyles Show. They have performed together for over 10 years and are regular entertainers at the Royal Variety Aftershow Party.

== Characters ==
Jay is played by Jamie Docherty AIMC (Associate of The Inner Magic Circle), a magician born in Northamptonshire in 1995.

Joss is played by Lewis Joss AIMC, born and raised in Bedfordshire. Lewis started work as an actor before turning his hand to performing magic full-time. Lewis has been promoted to the Associates of The Inner Magic Circle with a Silver Star.

== Career ==
Jay & Joss have performed twice at the Bedford Fringe Festival, the UK's 4th largest fringe festival. In 2020 Jay & Joss co-starred in the BBC Three mini-series School of Hard Tricks, where with other magicians they taught six strangers, battling personal challenges, to master the art of magic for a performance in a sold out theatre. They were featured in the 2020 Channel 4 documentary, A Day in the Life of Coronavirus Britain.

In November 2021 Jay & Joss appeared via a video link in the Rock Paper Magic! episode of Penn & Teller's Fool Us magic competition television series. Their trick was described as "...a really funny routine and perfectly done," but Penn and Teller were not fooled. During 2021 Jay & Joss adapted their shows for a coronavirus lock-downed virtual audience and described to the press the challenges this raised.

They performed at a fundraiser in April 2021 for the Huntington's Disease Association Youth Engagement Service. In September 2022 Jay & Joss performed in London's longest-running theatre magic show on tour, West End Magic, in Norwich. Radio X's Chris Moyles Show featured Jay & Joss in February 2023 assisting a presenter to perform sawing a woman in half live. From 2022 to 2024, Jay & Joss performed in 250 shows a year across all of Butlin's holiday resorts.

In May 2024 they appeared on Season 17 of Britain's Got Talent, with a wedding-themed routine that captivated both the judges and the audience. The couple, involved judges Simon Cowell, Amanda Holden, Alesha Dixon, and Bruno Tonioli in their act.

Jay & Joss appeared on ITV News while promoting a PR stunt for Wicksteed Park in February 2025. In which they made Merlin, the train vanish. This was performed to a live audience of staff and park goers in a one-take video. During February 2025, Jay & Joss also performed an illusion live on BBC Radio, where presenter, Bernie Keith was sawn in half.

In August 2025, the pair were credited as illusion designers and consultants, for a brand new theatre tour, The Void.

2026 saw the duo launch a new show called 'It's Not a Game', with a mention of 28 locations on their "most ambitious project to date". This tour was the first show which Jay & Joss worked alongside a so called "dream team", including writer Ryan Simons and producer Alex Moran. Critics described the show, based on Artificial intelligence, as "incredible illusions with technology, comedy and storytelling" and "completely magical".

== Awards ==
In 2021 Jay & Joss were promoted to the Associates of The Inner Magic Circle with a Silver Star.

In 2024, Jay & Joss won the title of The Magic Circle’s Champions of Stage Illusion.
