= Musée de la Magie =

Museum of magic, Paris, France

Coordinates: 48°51′11.2″N 2°21′40.2″E

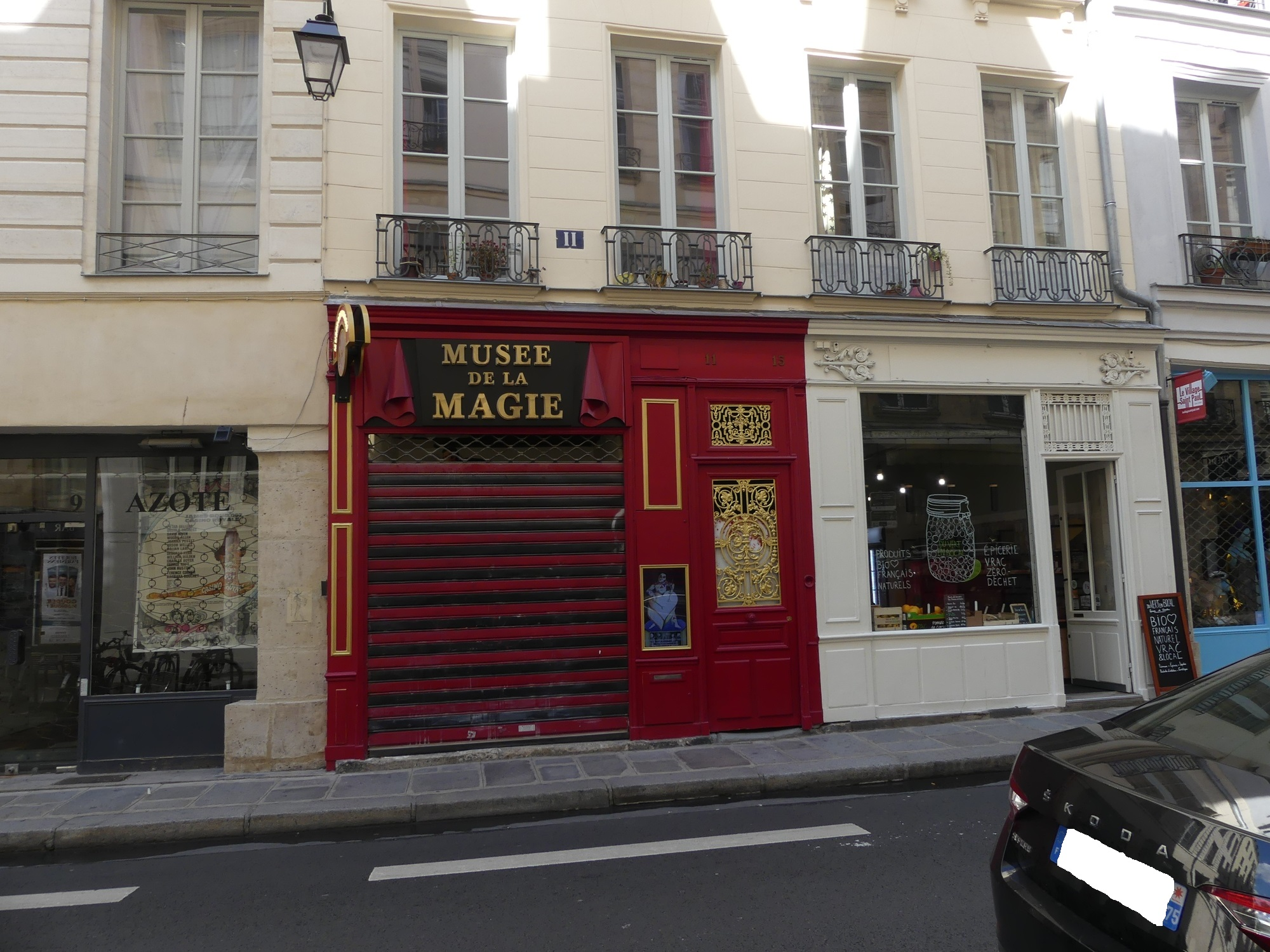
Musée de la Magie

The Musée de la Magie (French pronunciation: [myze də la maʒi]), also known as the Musée de la Curiosité et de la Magie and the Académie de la Magie, is a private museum located in the 4th arrondissement at 11, rue saint Paul in Paris, France. It is open several afternoons per week; an admission fee is charged.

The museum occupies 16th-century cellars beneath the Marquis de Sade's house, and includes items relating to magic shows, such as optical illusions, secret boxes, wind-up toys, magic mirrors, see-through glasses and posters. It also provides magic shows. The museum is collocated with the Musée des Automates, which contains more than 100 historical and contemporary automata.

The Museum of Magic is at 11 Rue Saint Paul in the 4th arrondissement. Nearest metro: St. Paul or Sully Morland.

== See also ==
- American Museum of Magic
- List of museums in Paris
- List of magic museums
