= Megan Swann =

Magician and first female president of the Magic Circle

Megan Knowles-Bacon (born 1992), known by her stage name Megan Swann, is a British magician who served as the first female president, and youngest president, of the Magic Circle, from 2021 to 2023.

== Career ==
Swann has been performing magic since she was a child. Her career began via the Young Magician's Club, a youth initiative of The Magic Circle. She became a member of The Magic Circle at 18. In 2014 at age 22, she became the first woman and youngest person to be elected as an officer of the society (she was elected as secretary), and she was elected as its Vice-President in 2019. Later, she served as its first female president, and youngest president, from 2021 to 2023.

Swann is passionate about nature, so uses her magic performance skills to promote environmental issues. She performs and tours the UK with her ‘Green Magic Show’ for children. She has a degree in Wildlife Conservation from University of Kent in Canterbury and performs 'environmental magic' which she describes as 'a powerful tool for sharing important messages in a fun and engaging way'.
