= Marvin Berglas =

British magician and entrepreneur

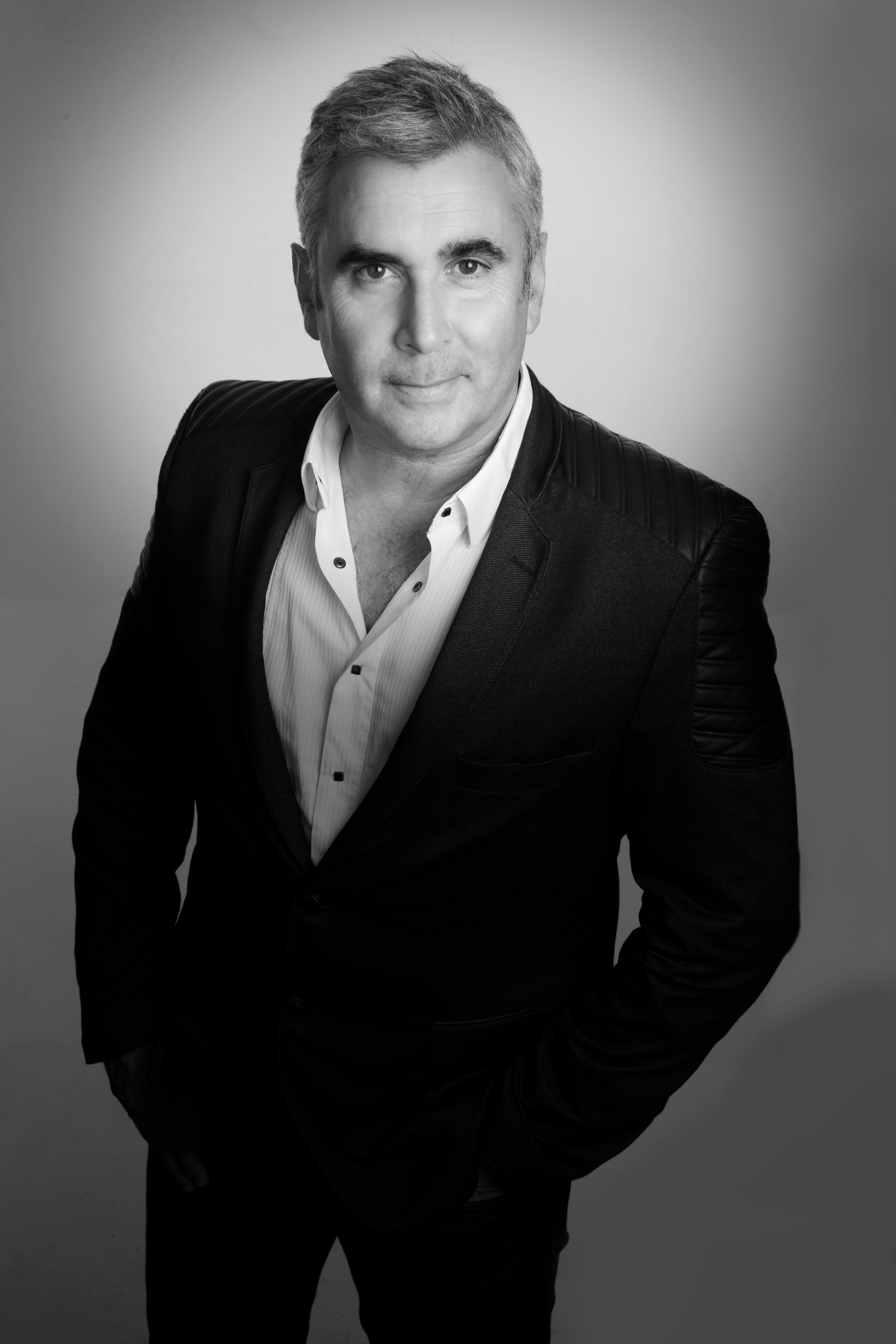
- Born: 3 January 1959 (age 67)
- Relatives: David Berglas (father)
- Website: marvinberglas.com

Marvin Berglas (born 3 January 1959) is a British magician, entrepreneur, and current president of The Magic Circle.

== Career ==
In 1987, Berglas founded Marvin's Magic, producers and creators of magic products in the United Kingdom.

In 1993, he became third resident magician in the Premier League at Arsenal F.C. For 25 years, he headed up their match day magic team, entertaining the VIP guests in the hospitality areas at the Emirates Stadium.

From 2017 to 2019, Berglas was vice president of The Magic Circle.. After failing to achieve presidency in 2 previous elections, he then became president in 2023.

Marv and his father have been guest artists and lecturers at the World Magic Congress and the Essential Magic Conferences..

== Awards and honors ==
Year	Organization	Award	Ref.
2014	The British Magical Society	Outstanding Contribution to Magic	
2015	British Toy and Hobby Industry	Outstanding Contribution Award	
2016	The Magic Circle	The Maskelyne Award	
2024	The British Magical Society	Honorary Vice President	

== Personal life ==
Berglas's father, David Berglas, was one of the first magicians to appear on television in the United Kingdom. He was also president of The Magic Circle from 1989 to 1998.
