= Museum of Illusions =

Specialized museum franchise

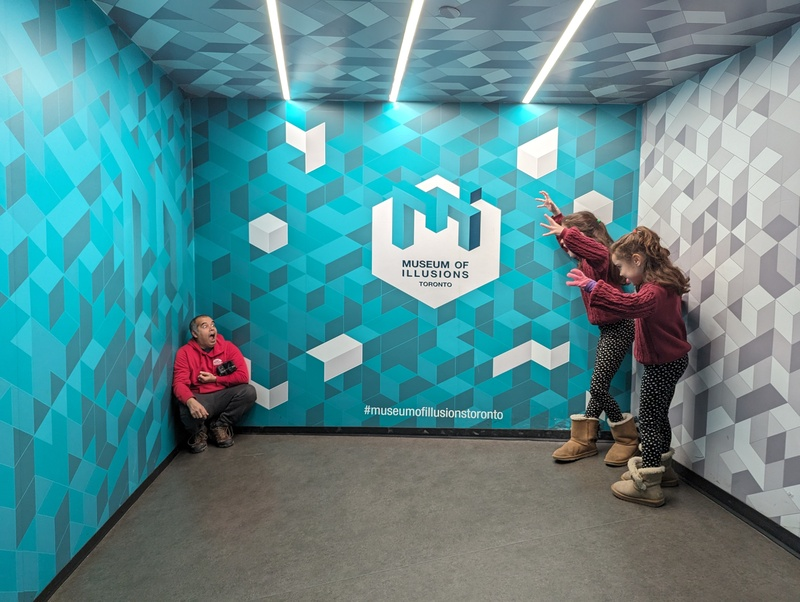
- Exhibit in the Museum of Illusions in Toronto
- Established: 2015 in Zagreb, Croatia
- Founders: Tomislav Pamuković; Roko Živković
- President: Teo Širola
- Owner: Metamorfoza d.o.o.
- Website: museumofillusions.com

The Museum of Illusions (Croatian: Muzej iluzija) is a franchise of museums that host a variety of exhibits of optical and other types of illusions. The first museum in the franchise was opened in 2015 in Zagreb, Croatia. As of May 2023, the franchise consists of 43 museums in 25 countries. The franchise is operated by Metamorfoza d.o.o., which is, as of 2021, majority-owned by Invera Equity Partners. link=File:Lexy_Tchuileu_at_Museum_of_Illusions_@@2.jpg|thumb|A person is shown in the Museum in a illusion exhibit.

== History ==
The idea for the museum was started by Tomislav Pamuković and Roko Živković after contemplating on "how to escape the corporate environment" and "making something my own". According to them, it was inspired by the National Geographic television show Brain Games. The first museum opened in 2015 in Zagreb, Croatia, with "two years passing between idea and realization". The franchising started in 2016 with museums opening in Zadar, Croatia and Ljubljana, Slovenia.

The franchise later expanded into multiple countries, with the largest museum opening in September 2023 in Las Vegas, United States. In May 2026 a branch opened in London.

== See also ==
- List of magic museums
- List of museums in Croatia
- List of museums in Qatar
