= Houdini Museum of New York =

The Houdini Museum of New York
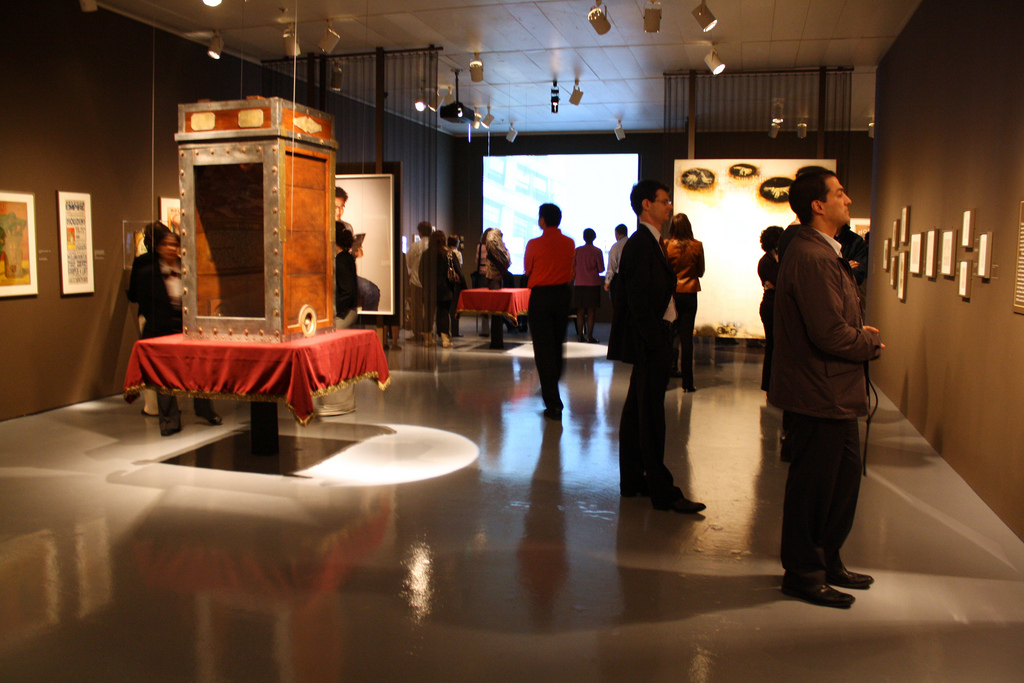
- Houdini Exhibition at The Jewish Museum New York
- Established: 2012
- Location: Wayne, NJ
- Coordinates: 40.7520447°N 73.9907061°W
- Type: Magic museum
- Owner: Roger Dreyer
- Website: www.houdinirevealed.com

The Houdini Museum of New York is a museum exhibiting memorabilia related to the escape artist, Harry Houdini. It is located at Fantasma Magic, a retail magic manufacturer.

== History ==
Opened in October 2012, the Houdini Museum of New York contains several hundred pieces of ephemera, most of which belonged to magician and escape artist Harry Houdini. Of the museum's many pieces, Houdini's 1907 escape coffin (in which Houdini was sealed with six-inch nails and subsequently escaped), the "robot" from Houdini's 1919 silent film The Master Mystery, and Houdini's Metamorphosis Trunk are the largest. Other notable pieces include the original bust from Houdini's grave (on loan to the museum from S.A.M. Parent Assembly Number One), Bess Houdini's stage outfit and a large selection of smaller pieces such as Houdini's personal magic and escape props. There are also many items related to Houdini's interest in the debunking of spiritualists. The Houdini memorabilia is said to be worth more than $1 million. and has been variously estimated to have cost "several million".

It is in an unassuming and almost unheralded location, and as such is easily missed. The museum has also been featured as both a point of interest and a background location on several television shows including ABC World News, Fox & Friends, NY1, MTV and Good Day New York.

The museum is owned by Houdini collector Roger Dreyer (also the owner and CEO of Fantasma Magic) and was designed by architect and designer David Rockwell. It features over 1,500 pieces of "Houdiniana," which portends an "ever changing display." Dreyer's Houdini collection is the second-largest in the world; the first being the collection of Las Vegas illusionist David Copperfield.

== Other Houdini museums ==
- 278 West 113th Street. (Note: Not per se a "museum", but it is a private residence with a documented Houdini connection and a lot of his artifacts. It has occasionally been open for guided tours. Not to be confused with the "House of Houdini", this is a former Houdini home, purchased in 1908, at 278 West 113th Street in modern-day Morningside Heights, Manhattan, that also displays Houdini artifacts.)
- Houdini Museum in Scranton, Pennsylvania
- American Museum of Magic
- David Copperfield's International Museum and Library of the Conjuring Arts, which is closed to the public
- The History Museum at the Castle (Appleton, Wisconsin)
- The House of Houdini. Likewise, in 1919 he rented the cottage (Note: "Not the home, which was sensationally dubbed "the Houdini mansion" when it burned in 1959, and has been rebuilt using the name "Houdini Estate.") at 2435 Laurel Canyon Boulevard in Los Angeles, while making movies for Lasky Pictures. His wife occupied it for a time after his death. As of 2011 the site of the cottage was a vacant lot and up for sale. The main mansion building itself was rebuilt after it was destroyed in the 1959 Laurel Canyon fire, and is now a historic venue and called The Mansion. While Houdini did not likely live at the "mansion," there is some probability that his widow did.
- University of Texas Library houses Houdini ephemera and a large collection of Houdini letters and manuscripts.

== See also ==
- List of magic museums
