= Oxygen (1999 film) =

- Poster
- Directed by: Richard Shepard
- Written by: Richard Shepard
- Produced by: Richard Shepard; Jonathan Stern; Mike Curb; Carole Curb Nemoy
- Starring: Maura Tierney; Adrien Brody; Terry Kinney; Dylan Baker
- Cinematography: Sarah Cawley
- Edited by: Adam Lichenstein
- Music by: Rolfe Kent
- Distributed by: A-Pix Entertainment Inc.
- Release date: November 12, 1999
- Running time: 92 minutes
- Country: United States
- Language: English
- Box office: $3,088 (US)

Oxygen is a 1999 thriller film, directed and written by Richard Shepard. The film follows a troubled cop, Madeline Foster (Maura Tierney) as she pursues a kidnapper who calls himself Harry Houdini (Adrien Brody). The film was shot on location in New York City.

== Plot ==
A serial killer calling himself "Harry Houdini" has kidnapped and buried alive a rich businessman's wife, Frances. He demands $1 million in cash from the woman's husband, Clark Hannon, in return for the release of the location of her burial site before she runs out of oxygen. He also states that if police involvement is initiated, he will ensure she is never found alive. As expected, however, police involvement is initiated and Detective Madeline Foster is assigned the task of finding the buried woman and catching Houdini.

When Houdini is finally caught as the result of a car chase involving him and Detective Foster, she attempts to get him to reveal the location of his buried victim. When Foster's initial interrogation of Houdini proves unsuccessful, the FBI are assigned to take over the case, although they do not have any more luck. In a plot twist, it is revealed that Houdini has already committed a murder, that of his accomplice, found in a cheap airport motel room. He now has nothing to lose and the police realize the death of the buried woman would not be as significant as first thought.

However, Houdini offers them a final lifeline---if he is allowed to talk to Foster, alone, he will allow his victim to be recovered alive. The police, now just puppets in Houdini's plan, agree to his request. Troubled, Foster begins to reveal her darker side to Houdini and he sees a kindred spirit in her.

Soon after, it is revealed that Houdini was in fact a painter in the police department, and outlined the entire building in a very detailed map. Just as Foster is revealing the truth, Houdini takes her to the place where he buried the first woman. He digs up Frances' coffin, but she appears dead. Suddenly, her arm appears and slams Houdini on the head with her flashlight. Foster reaches for Houdini's gun, and then pushes him inside the now vacant coffin. As he taunts Foster, she shoots him rather than burying him.

On a gurney, the rescued woman is taken away in an ambulance, as Foster acknowledges her husband Clark's nod. She joins her husband, Tim, in a nearby diner.

== Popular culture ==
=== Exhibits ===
The House of Houdini is a museum and performance venue located at 11, Dísz square in the Buda Castle in Budapest, Hungary. In addition to housing the largest collection of original Houdini artifacts in Europe, it also includes original props from the film Oxygen (1999).

=== Other media ===
The deathcore bands Job for a Cowboy and Killwhitneydead have both released songs that feature a sound sample from this film where the woman is being buried. Job for a Cowboy included the sample in their track "Catharsis for the Buried" which appears as an intro for their Doom EP (2005). Killwhitneydead included the sample (among others from this film) on their song "I Already Have Enough Friends (Take Two)" (2004).

== Reception ==
The film aggregator Rotten Tomatoes gave the film a score of 77%.
