= Ken Brooke =

English magician

Ken Brooke (3 November 1920 – 26 February 1983) was a stage magician who ran a magic shop in London, where for 50 years he trained many well-known magicians.

== Career ==
Brooke gave his first performance at the age of seven. He took magic lessons with Walter Jeans and was influenced by Albert Verity, Jack le Dair, Park Shackelton, Trevor Hall and Roland Winder. He left school at fourteen to take up tailoring. During World War II he served in the Royal Air Force in North Africa, the Western Desert and Italy. He was placed in charge of an entertainment unit and regularly entertained the troops. He was twice mentioned in dispatches.

After the war, Brooke worked for Alan Milan and Paul Veroni at the Veroni House of Magic. He set up his own business in Thornton Road, Bradford. The business failed, and Harry Stanley engaged him to manage the Unique Magic Studio in London. He supplemented his income by working the London cabaret circuit. In 1966, supported by Frank Farrow, he set up Ken Brooke's Magic Place on Wardour Street. At the time, he was the only magic dealer in the world who offered a money-back guarantee on everything he sold. Some magicians, including Fred Kaps, Finn Jon, Gaetan Bloom, Johnny Thompson, Scotty York, Wayne Dobson, Ali Bongo and Terri Rogers gave Brooke exclusive marketing rights to their effects, routines and ideas.

In 1960, Brooke received a Performing Fellowship Award from the Academy of Magical Arts, and a year later he received a Diplome d’Honneur from the Fédération Internationale des Sociétés Magiques (FISM). 1n 1980, a Fiesta of Magic was held in his honour at the Blackpool Magic Convention, raising a substantial amount of money for him for services to magic. In 1981, he was awarded a Special Fellowship Award from the Academy of Magical Arts. By this time, he had suffered a serious stroke. Siegfried and Roy held a party in their Las Vegas home to honour Ken.

Brooke performed his first show to the London Concert Artists Association in summer 1962 to a professional audience including Billy McComb, John Brierly, Frank Farrow and Alan Shaxon.

Brooke influenced many performers, including Al Koran, Paul Daniels, Wayne Dobson, Gaetan Bloom and John Milner.

== Funeral ==
Brooke died on 26 February 1983 and was cremated at Golders Green Crematorium in London. A memorial service was held for him at St Paul's, Covent Garden. Readings were given by Paul Daniels and John Fisher. The service was conducted by Roger Crosthwaite.
