= David Berglas =

British magician and mentalist (1926–2023)

David Berglas MBE
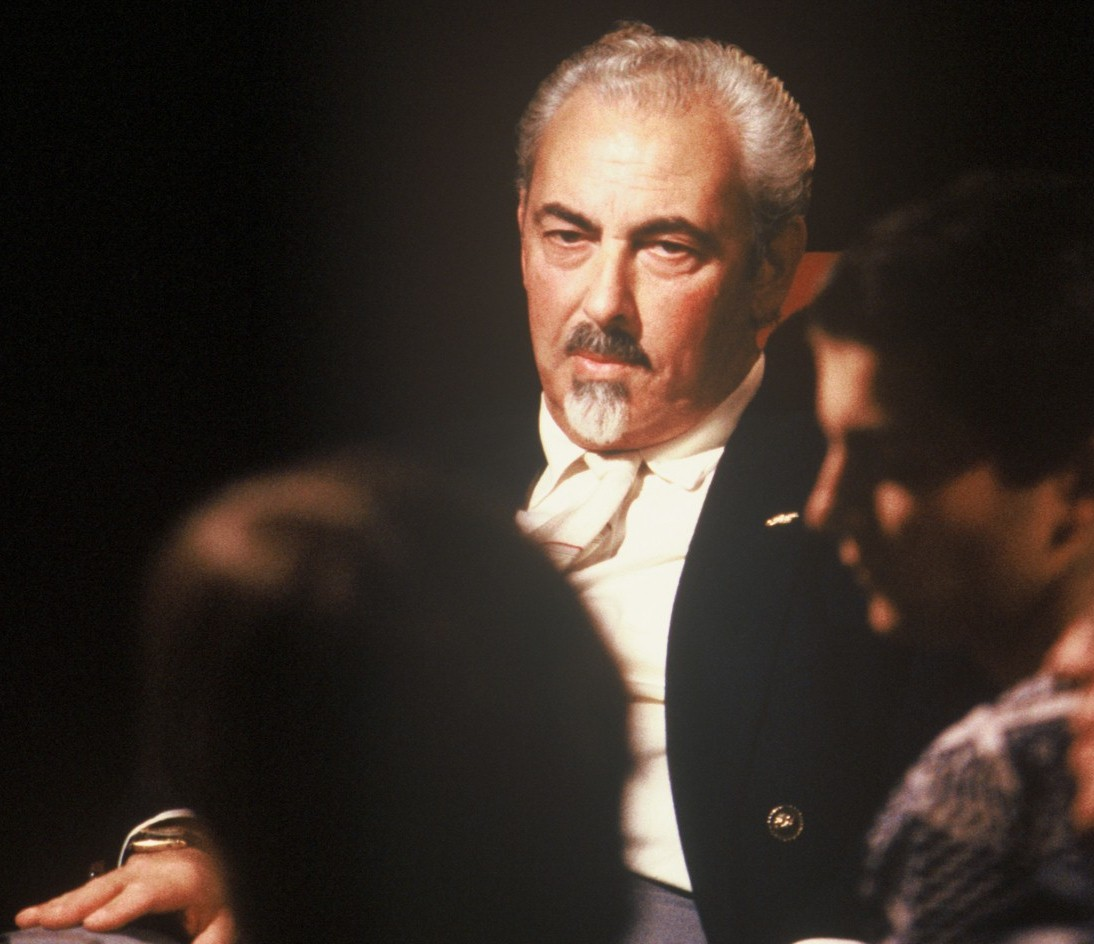
- Berglas appearing on television discussion After Dark in 1989
- Born: David Gert Heinz Berglas; 30 July 1926; Berlin, Weimar Republic, Germany
- Died: 3 November 2023 (aged 97); London, England
- Occupations: Psychological magician and mentalist
- Relatives: Marvin Berglas (son)
- Website: Official site

David Berglas MBE (30 July 1926 – 3 November 2023) was a British magician and mentalist, born in Germany. He invented what is now considered the Holy Grail of card magic called the Berglas Effect (known to magicians as “any card at any number” or ACAAN for short) and was able to perform it in extremely fair conditions such that it fooled magicians. No one to this day knows his method of performing it. He was one of the first magicians to appear on UK television.

== Personal life ==
Berglas was educated in several different European countries. He was Jewish, and escaped to Britain from Nazi Germany, aged 11.

Keen to be part of the war, he discovered that the American Army was urgently looking for suitable recruits for an important role in the denazification of Germany. They had to have some previous military training and to be able to pass strict physical and mental tests. Most importantly they had to speak two languages besides English, one of which had to be fluent German. The required minimum age was 21. Berglas explained that he was only 19 but could meet all the other qualifications. He was accepted into the Intelligence Service of the US Army, serving an 'adventure filled' 18 months at the end of World War II. He then attended Bradford Technical College to study textiles with a view of joining his family business based in Wyke, a village in Bradford.

Berglas first became interested in magic in 1947, through a chance meeting with magician Ken Brooke. Magic became an all-absorbing hobby for about five years, during which time he studied psychotherapy, specialising in medical hypnosis.

Berglas died on 3 November 2023 in London, at the age of 97.

=== Career ===
In 1999, he established a non-profit organisation called the Foundation for Promoting the Art of Magic (FP-AM). The Foundation presents "The David Berglas International Magic Award" annually at the International Magic Convention in London. It was first awarded to the organisers of the convention, The MacMillan family, then in 2008 to Uri Geller (Israel), in 2009 to David Copperfield (USA), in 2010 to Juan Tamariz (Spain), in 2011 to Derren Brown (UK) in 2012 to Jeff McBride (USA), and in 2013 Lu Chen (Taiwan) was the recipient. In 2014 the award was given to Berglas himself. The Award Committee had led Berglas to believe that the award was being presented to Dynamo, who after receiving it used sleight-of-hand to change the engraved name on the award to Berglas's and presented it to him instead.

The British Magical Society is the oldest magic club in the UK. It has awarded "The David Berglas Trophy" annually since 1988 to leading British magicians. On 14 May 2018, journalist, magician and TV producer Martin T. Hart met David Berglas over five years to film and then publish The David Berglas Scrapbooks, which can be viewed on Berglas's YouTube channel or website. The videos document his life and career in his own words, with previously unseen footage and photos.

==== Berglas Effect ====
In the 1950s, Berglas created what is now referred to as the "Holy Grail" of card magic, known as "The Berglas Effect", in which a magician appears to allow someone to freely name any playing card and freely select any position in a deck ("any card at any number"), and the specified card is found at the specified position in a random deck. The effect was first named "The Berglas Effect" by Jon Racherbaumer in his 1984 book At The Table.

== Film ==
Berglas was involved with films, acting as a creative consultant and technical advisor, including:

- The 1967 version of Casino Royale, with Orson Welles, Peter Sellers, David Niven and Woody Allen.
- Stanley Kubrick's Barry Lyndon with Ryan O'Neal in 1975
- Albert R. Broccoli's Octopussy with Roger Moore in 1981
- George Lucas's Willow with Warwick Davis in 1988
- Tim Burton's Batman with Jack Nicholson in 1989

== Radio ==
Berglas conducted what he called "Nationwide Psychological Experiments", involving millions of listeners in their homes. This part of the show required listeners to write in to confirm their reactions. His weekly broadcasts included sensational stunts, including hanging a box over Regent Street, London for a whole week. It had been officially sealed by the Diplomatic Corps of the Admiralty and, when opened, it contained the passport of a randomly selected member of the studio audience, sitting in the Playhouse Theatre by the Embankment. The passport had disappeared just moments before. He appeared on sound radio, on and off, for about 17 years, and when commercial radio first started he had a regular phone-in programme, late at night on LBC (London Broadcasting Company), which started in 1973.

== Television ==
Berglas was one of the first magicians to appear on British television with his own show. Meet David Berglas in 1954. Other television series followed and were highly acclaimed in the Netherlands, Sweden, Norway and Germany. Commercial television started in the UK in September 1955 and the first ever series was presented by Berglas on Associated Rediffusion called Focus on Hocus. In the 1970s he presented a one-hour television special from Las Vegas and in the UK he presented his Channel 4 series The Mind of David Berglas (1985–1986) where he interviewed and entertained celebrity guests including Omar Sharif, Christopher Lee, Britt Ekland, Peter Cook, Graham Chapman and Max Bygraves.

== Books ==
In 1967, he released his best-selling Dutch book David Berglas onthult...bijna alles (David Berglas reveals...nearly everything), published by H.J.W. Becht's Uitgeversmaatschappij N.V. and in 1988 A Question of Memory (with Guy Lyon Playfair), published by Jonathan Cape Ltd. (ISBN 0 224 025570). He has written a number of articles and lecture notes for the magical fraternity, including The David Berglas File No.1 (1976) and the now out of print The Mind and Magic of David Berglas – As Revealed to David Britland, 2002, published by Jim Steinmeyer through Hahne Publications.

In 2011, he released a book with Richard J. Kaufman entitled The Berglas Effects. This is the book named after his "Any Card at Any Number" plot. The book has a foreword by Juan Tamariz and an afterword by Max Maven, contains 3 DVDs and also includes a pair of 3D glasses. In 2012 he provided both a contribution and foreword to the PSYCRETS book Liber Mentis (ISBN 978-1-291-10732-6). A mysterium of effects essays and routines, edited and authored by Steve Drury. That year, Berglas provided the foreword to Dunninger Knows, by Joe Atmore

== Honours ==
- In 1967, after his popular Dutch television series 'OPUS 13', he was named "Television Personality of the Year", the first time it had ever been awarded to a foreign celebrity.
- President of the International Brotherhood of Magicians (British Ring) 1976/1977.
- He has appeared on the covers of leading magic magazines including The Linking Ring (1977), Abra (1992), Magic (1998), The Genii (2007), and The Magic Circular (1957, 1975, 1989, 1992, 1996, 2000, 2006).
- In 1979, he was voted "King Rat" of the Grand Order of Water Rats, the world's leading show business charity organisation.
- He was a past President of The Magic Circle (1989–1998)
- The Magic Circle presented him with the coveted "Gold Medal" in the year 2000 (which at the time had only been presented six times before, since 1926). In 1995 he received The "Maskelyne Award" for outstanding contribution to British magic and in October 2011, received The Magic Circle's highest international award, The David Devant.
- He had also been honoured internationally including the "Gold Plaque" in Sweden, 1980 and the prestigious gold "Grolla" in Italy, 2008.
- The Academy of Magical Arts, Hollywood, awarded David with a "Special Fellowship" in 2000, and the "Masters Fellowship" in 2004.
- In 2008, he was bestowed the "Griffin Award" and named "Grand Master of Mystery" by PSYCRETS (The British Society of Mystery Entertainers).
- He was presented with a Lifetime Achievement Award at the Session Convention in Gloucester, January 2011
- In 2014, he was awarded The International Magic Award, at the International Magic Convention, London
- He was awarded an MBE in the 2019 New Year Honours List.
