= The Magic Circle (organisation) =

British organisation for amateur and professional magicians

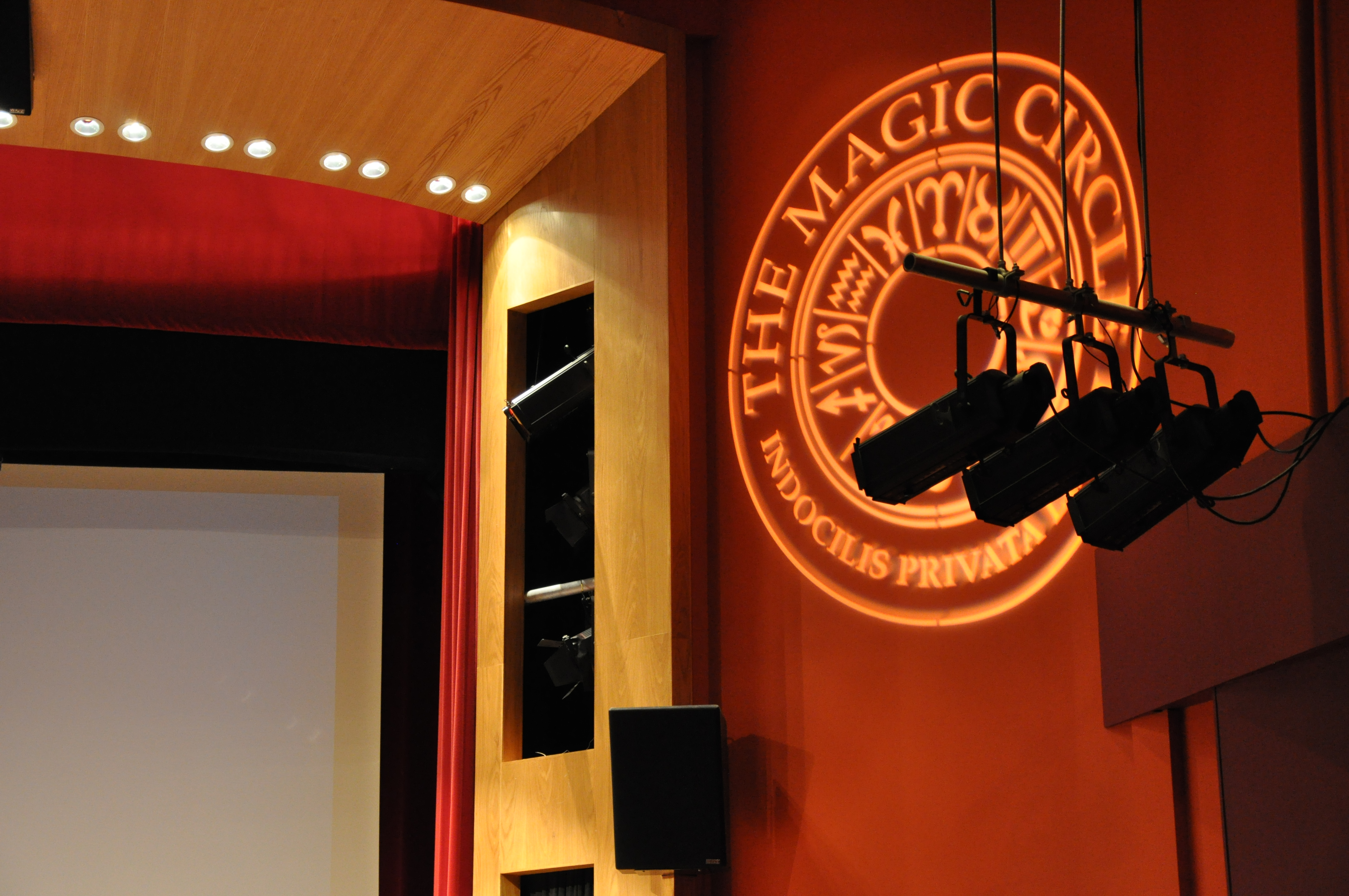
- The Magic Circle Theatre
- Formation: 1905 (121 years ago)
- Type: Club
- Purpose: To promote and advance the art of magic
- Headquarters: Euston; London, NW1; U.K.
- Coordinates: 51°31′35″N 0°08′08″W
- Members: 1,534 (2023)
- Official language: English
- President: Marvin Berglas
- Main organ: The Magic Circular
- Website: themagiccircle.co.uk
- Remarks: Motto: Indocilis Privata Loqui ("not apt to disclose secrets")

The Magic Circle is a British organisation dedicated to promoting and advancing the art of magic.

Applicants must qualify for membership, either through a performance exam or by a written thesis on a branch of magic, after which they are designated members of the Magic Circle (M.M.C.). Further distinctions may earn them the titles of associate of the Inner Magic Circle (A.I.M.C.) and member of the Inner Magic Circle (M.I.M.C), a select group limited to 300 members. The Circle was founded in 1905, and was male-only until 1991. There is a junior branch, the Young Magicians Club.

== History ==
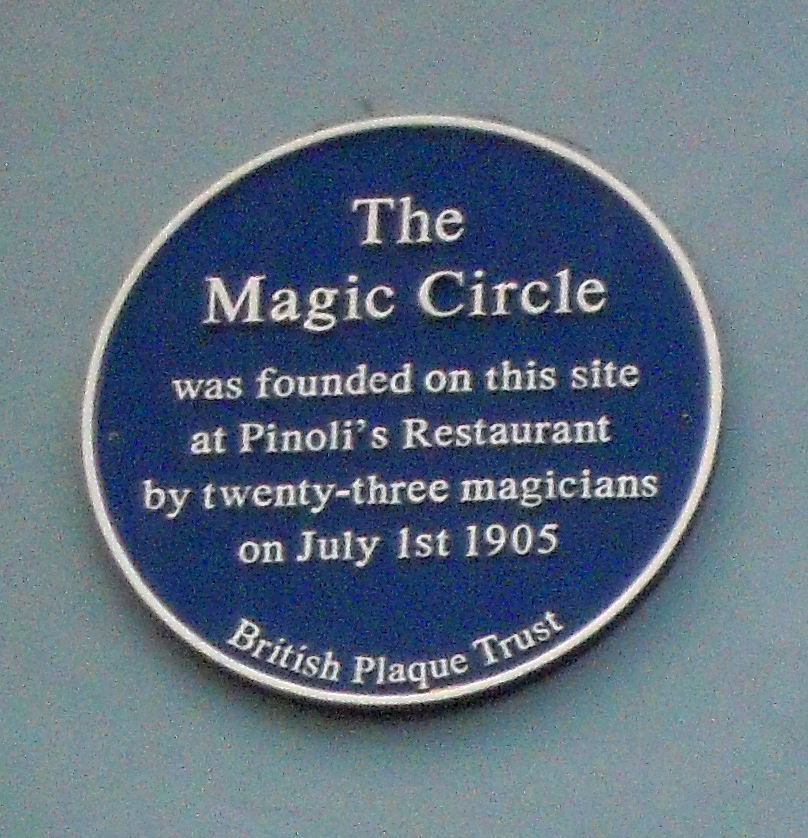
Blue plaque commemorating the founding of The Magic Circle on the former Pinoli's Restaurant in Wardour Street

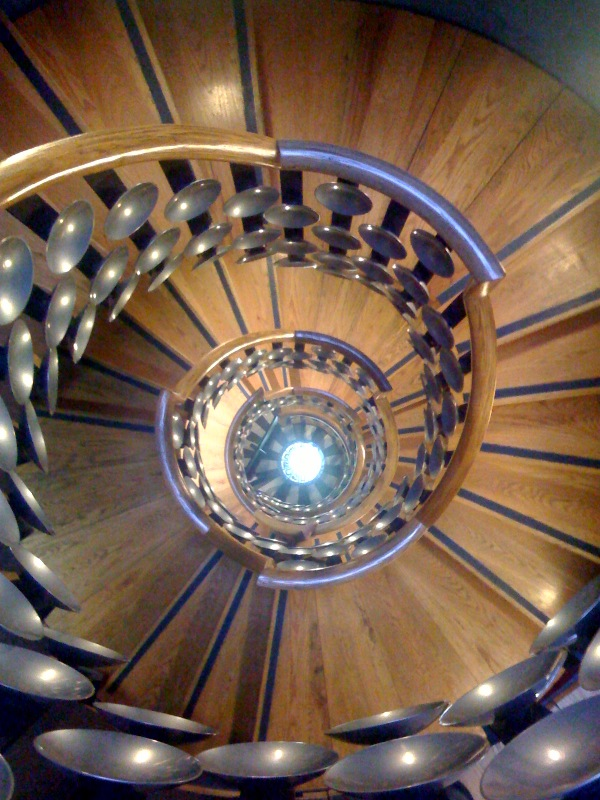
A staircase at The Magic Circle building

The Magic Circle was founded in 1905 after a meeting of 23 amateur and professional magicians at London's Pinoli's Restaurant. At this founders meeting, chaired by Servais Le Roy, those present decided upon the name of the Society: it was initially felt that the name of the Society should be the Martin Chapender Club, in memory of the performer and founding member who had recently died at the age of 25. However, it was finally agreed that the name "Magic Circle", which shares the same initials as those of Martin Chapender, would be more appropriate.

The first official meeting was at the Green Man public house in Soho, but meetings were later in a room at St George's Hall in Langham Place, where David Devant and John Nevil Maskelyne were regularly seen performing.

Devant became the first president of The Magic Circle, and in 1906, Maskelyne edited the first issue of The Magic Circular magazine, a regular feature for members ever since. The Magic Circular claims to be the longest-running regular magic magazine in conjuring history.

The club admitted only men until 1991, when more than 75% of members voted to admit women. But the club's first woman member, Sophie Lloyd, had already joined surreptitiously 18 months earlier, disguising herself as a man with the help of fellow magician Jenny Winstanley, and using the name Raymond Lloyd. When she revealed her gender after women were officially allowed to join, the Magic Circle's members voted to expel her for "deliberate deception". In 2024, the club's first female chair, Laura London, said that she was trying to track down Lloyd in order to apologise and to readmit her, but that Lloyd seemed to have disappeared some time after 1997. In 2025, Lloyd was alerted to the search for her by her sister and admitted to the Magic Circle under her own name.

As of 2024, 5% of the 1,700 members are women. In 2014, Megan Knowles-Bacon became the first female officer in the Magic Circle, as well as the youngest person to be elected as an officer; she was elected as secretary. In September 2021 she was elected as the Magic Circle's first female, and youngest ever, president, using her working name Megan Swann.

== Motto ==
The motto of the society is the Latin indocilis privata loqui, which roughly translated means "not apt to disclose secrets". Members give their word not to wilfully disclose magic secrets other than to bona fide students of magic. Anyone breaking this or any other rule may be expelled.

== Headquarters ==
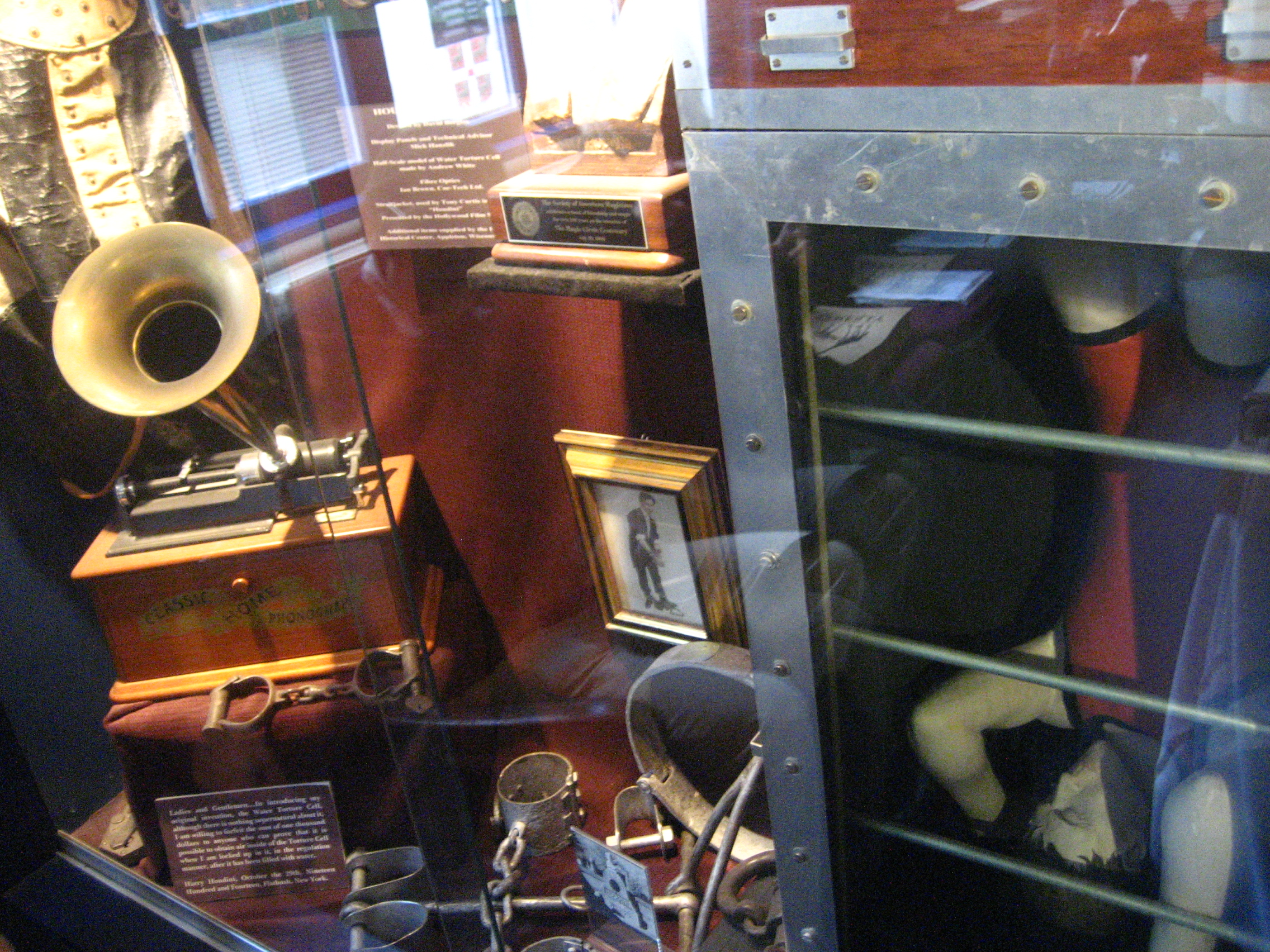
'Houdini's Cabinet' at The Magic Circle Museum, London

Since 1998, The Magic Circle building in central London near Euston Station in Camden has been available for meetings and corporate entertainment. It was voted the UK's Number One Venue in the hospitality industry's Top 20 UK Venues poll 2008.

The Magic Circle's headquarters houses a theatre, library, museum, dining room, clubroom and bars. The museum features magic tricks, props, posters, programmes, toys, photographs and artefacts related to conjuring history. Items of interest include, Robert Harbin's original Zig Zag illusion, Chung Ling Soo's robes, an original Sooty with associated Harry Corbett apparatus, sets of props used by television magicians David Nixon and Tommy Cooper, a sound recording of Harry Houdini taken from an Edison cylinder, and a set of cups and balls used by Charles, the then Prince of Wales when he took his Magic Circle exam in 1975. Visits are by arranged tour.

== Membership ==
Magicians who wish to join may spend up to one year as an apprentice before applying for full membership. They need to have known two current members for at least one year and must be at least 18 years old. These two members are then asked to act as proposer and seconder on the candidate's application form and propose them as a suitable candidate for membership. Following the receipt and processing of the application, the candidate is invited to an interview with the examinations secretary, usually at the London headquarters. If the candidate proves suitable and sufficiently knowledgeable a performance exam is scheduled or a thesis may be written. The exam takes place in front of a panel of judges, and candidates must demonstrate their skills to members in a rehearsed act.

If a thesis is chosen, it is read by two examiners and a copy is made available in The Magic Circle library. The final stage is by vote by members of the Council, who will approve the candidate as a member. Once the applicant is successful, they are free to call themselves "Members of the Society" and use the letters M.M.C. after their name.

Members of The Magic Circle include: King Charles III, Jay & Joss, Luis de Matos, Michael Vincent, Dynamo, and Stephen Fry. Penn & Teller, however, had been refused membership due to their tradition of revealing the secrets to magic tricks during their performances. They were eventually granted membership in 2025.

Members must undertake not to reveal magic secrets to anyone except bona fide magicians; anyone breaking this rule may be expelled. An example of this was when the former Young Magician of the Year Dominic Wood was expelled for publishing magic books containing secrets behind tricks.

=== Associate of the Inner Magic Circle ===
Members may take a further examination to achieve the degree of Associate of the Inner Magic Circle. The designation A.I.M.C. shows this higher membership. The A.I.M.C. degree can also be attained through thesis, and in rare cases – that is when a candidate gains 18 or higher out of a possible 20 marks in the written exam – examinees taking the M.M.C. exam are awarded the A.I.M.C. degree. Those who attain an A.I.M.C. degree as a result of a performance examination are awarded the A.I.M.C. with silver star.

=== Inner Magic Circle ===
Within the society, there are a number of members never exceeding 300 known as the Inner Magic Circle. Full membership of the Inner Magic Circle is denoted by the letters M.I.M.C. after the member's name. Membership of the Inner Magic Circle is by call of The Society's President. The M.I.M.C. degree may be awarded with a gold star, to signify that the recipient is a performer of magic (as opposed to e.g. an inventor, historian or noteworthy volunteer for the Society).

== The Young Magicians Club ==
The Young Magicians Club is part of the Youth Initiative of The Magic Circle (the other major part being the prestigious Young Magician of the Year Competition) and is a club for magicians between the inclusive ages of 10 and 18 which was founded in 1996. Sponsored by The Magic Circle, members of the Young Magicians Club meet for monthly workshops at The Magic Circle Headquarters, the 'Centre for the Magic Arts' in London. The Young Magicians Club has a current membership of around 200 members.

The Young Magicians Club's principal means of communication among its members is its bi-monthly magazine Secrets. The worldwide membership also communicates through a members-only on-line forum on the Young Magicians Club website.

Membership in The Young Magicians Club requires no interview or exam and is open to all young people interested in magic. There are monthly all-day workshops for members who come from all over the country to take part. Adult members of The Magic Circle take on the responsibility of instructing the members of the Young Magicians Club. Local adult magic clubs will often have a junior magicians club attached to them but The Young Magicians Club is the only such club associated with The Magic Circle. Members of the Young Magicians Club are eligible to join The Magic Circle at a reduced rate when they reach 18, but then they must complete the examination procedure for full membership.

The Young Magicians Club holds their annual one-day convention every October called 'J-Day'. The convention includes lectures and the finals of two competitions with awards, which include the Home Counties Trophy for stage magic, The Mark Leveridge Cup for close-up magic, Kaymar Komedy Cup and the Peter McCahon Award for Originality. In recent years, the celebrity guest lectures have been presented by Derren Brown in 2010, Dynamo in 2011, John Archer in 2012, Marvin Berglas in 2013, Luis De Matos in 2014 and Dave Loosley and Andi Gladwin in 2015.

The popularity of the Harry Potter franchise was one of the key reasons for the organisation's growth this century with membership doubling after the announcement of the first film in 2001.

== List of presidents ==
Years	President
1905 – 1906	David Devant
1906 – 1924	Nevil Maskelyne
1924 – 1928	Clive Maskelyne
1928 – 1931	Herbert J. Collings
1931 – 1935	Oliver Russell, 2nd Baron Ampthill
1935 – 1954	Evelyn Seymour, 17th Duke of Somerset
1954 – 1958	Herbert J. Collings
1958 – 1989	Francis White
1989 – 1998	David Berglas
1998 – 2003	Michael Bailey
2003 – 2008	Alan Shaxon
2008 – 2009	Ali Bongo
2009 – 2014	Jack Delvin
2014 – 2019	Scott Penrose
2019 – 2021	Noel Britten
2021 – 2023	Megan Swann
2023 – present	Marvin Berglas

== Awards ==
The Magic Circle presents several awards:

- David Devant Award. Instituted in 1999, this award recognises individuals who have made major contributions to the advancement of magic or who have rendered distinguished service to the art internationally.
- Maskelyne Award. Instituted in 1970, it honours outstanding service to magic in Britain and to the magical profession.
- David Berglas Award. Instituted in 2024, recognising excellence in performance, originality and showmanship in magic.
- Carlton Award. Instituted in 1989. Recognising achievement in comedy magic.
- John Nevil Maskelyne Prize. Instituted in 1987. Awarded for contributions to the literature or study of magic.
- Cecil Lyle Award. Instituted in 1989. Presented annually for the best item published in the society's magazine The Magic Circular.

== See also ==
- Academy of Magical Arts and its headquarters, The Magic Castle
- American Museum of Magic
- List of magic museums
