= American Museum of Magic =

Museum in Marshall, Michigan

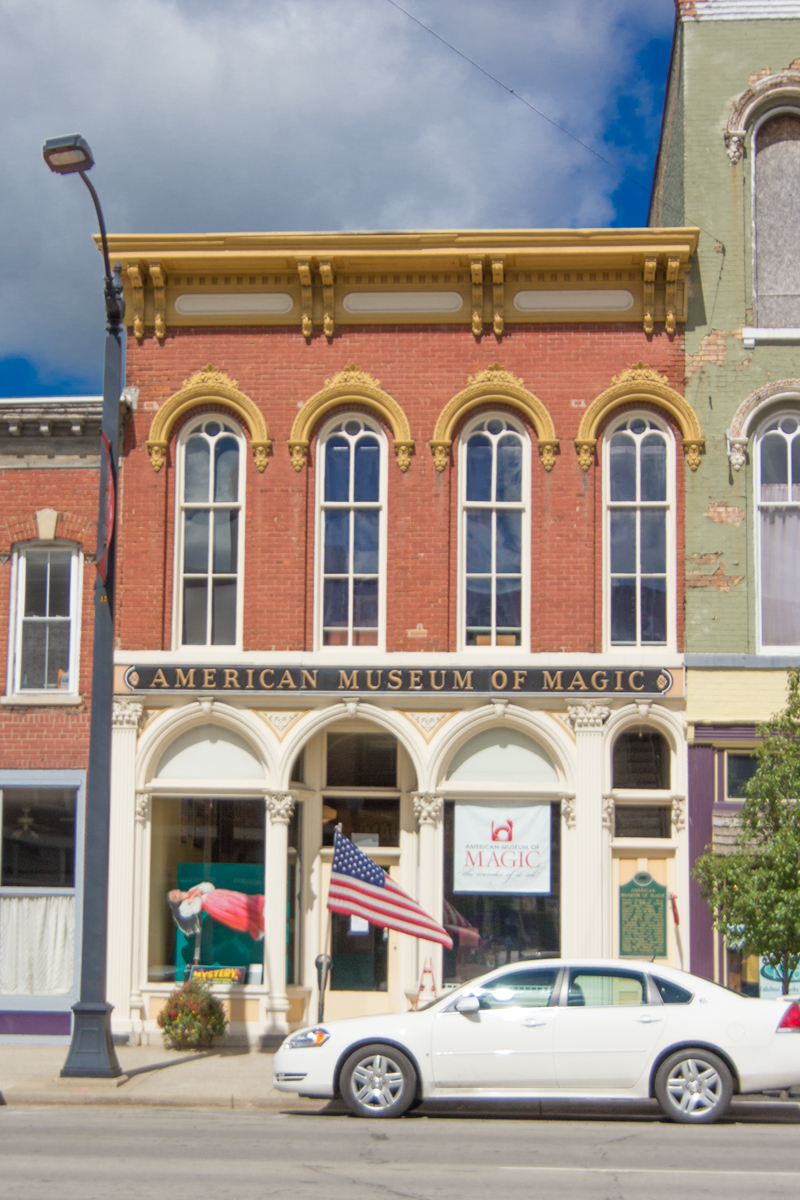

- Location of American Museum of Magic American Museum of Magic (the United States)
- Established: April 1, 1978
- Location: Marshall, Michigan
- Coordinates: 42.2722°N 84.9585°W
- Website: americanmuseumofmagic.com

The American Museum of Magic in Marshall, Michigan, houses a large collection of magical paraphernalia and illusions, including an extensive collection of devices that once belonged to famed magician Harry Blackstone Sr., (1885–1965).

== Museum collection ==
The American Museum of Magic is the largest magic museum in the United States open to the public. The collection is extensive, and includes both famous and obscure magicians (for example, it has artifacts from Clare Cummings, who was 'Milky The Twin Pines Magic Clown' and who donated most of his magic tricks to this museum). The museum celebrates the art of magic and the devotion of magicians to their craft. Founded on April 1, 1978, the museum celebrated its 30th anniversary in 2008.

As the Michigan Historical marker on the site notes: this "unique collection … celebrates the magician's arts of wonder and delight. Michigan's link to magic is no illusion for nearby Colon, Michigan, a center of magic manufacturing," and Harry Blackstone's home. Registered Site L1240 Erected 1985. Indeed, the town and Mr. Blackstone are noted in another historical marker in Colon.

It has been described as "the Smithsonian Museum of magic." "It is this wealth of extra, un-exhibited stuff that gives this place such promise. ... The museum has thousands of files on everyone from Doug Henning to Donna Delberts, 'the world's only lady fire eater', who turned out to be an AWOL American GI and a man."

Specifically, the museum includes 2,009 heralds, handbills, and window cards, 587 show-bills, and over 5,000 programs, 10,000 books, 24,000 magazines, and 46,000 photos. The museum's collection also includes apparatus, magic sets, letters, diaries, manuscripts, scrapbooks, and a half million pieces of "ephemera." The archive, located in the Lund Memorial Library, includes thousands of little-known illusionists. Magician David Copperfield calls it "one of my favorite places on earth".

Important exhibits include Doug Henning's "Zig Zag" illusion, various apparatus used by Howard Thurston in "one of the largest illusion shows across America", and the “Milk Can” and "Overboard Box" used by Harry Houdini.

Lund at one time was in possession of a large cache of important books by occultist Aleister Crowley from Crowley's own collection, which Crowley had stored in a Detroit warehouse many years previously but had not reclaimed.

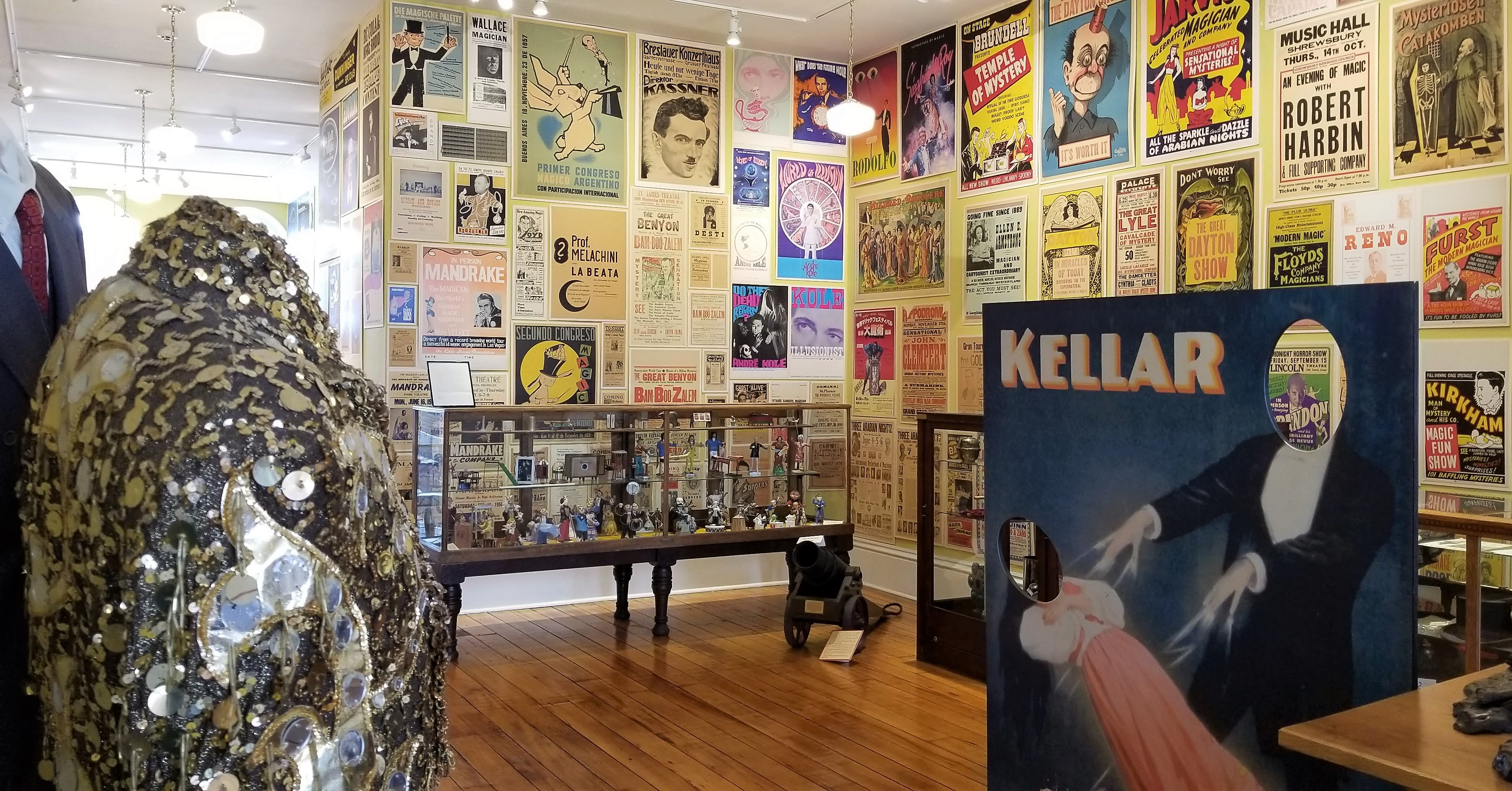
One of the rooms inside the museum.

== History ==
The American Museum of Magic was founded by the late Robert Lund, a Detroit-area writer and editor who was an obsessed collector of magic artifacts, with the assistance of his wife, the late Elaine Lund. It is said Mr. Lund liked the craft and skills, but decided early on that he lacked the showmanship necessary to become a world class magician. Instead Lund determined that his mark on magic would be to become its foremost student of magic history and collect everything he could find that related to his beloved art. Following his lifelong quest, he "ultimately gathered a collection that grew to be one of the worlds largest and greatest."

The museum is housed in a 140-year-old Victorian building (built in 1868) which has been a saloon, billiard parlor, clothing store, and museum. It is located at 107 East Michigan Avenue, Marshall, Calhoun County, Michigan. The building has been meticulously restored by Bob and Elaine Lund. She silk screened window posters, restored floors, installed cabinets, and did major clean up. Their daughter has ably assisted. They "put their heart and souls into the Museum." The City of Marshall was sufficiently impressed that it awarded them a silver cup.

== Museum operation and events ==
In 2005 the museum was taken over by a new board of directors, which has sought to revitalize it. The American Museum of Magic, Inc. is a tax exempt 501(c)(3) charitable corporation.

The museum offers group tours, field trips, virtual tours, and virtual student workshops. The Lund Memorial Library houses much of the museum's collection and is open by appointment to researchers. Each October the Museum regularly hosts an event of prestidigitation, escape, and feats that are said to be amazing.

Magician Terry Evanswood was given an award by the museum.

== Other Blackstone exhibits ==
In 1985, on the 100th anniversary of his father's birth, Harry Blackstone Jr. donated to the Smithsonian Institution in Washington D.C. the original floating light bulb - Thomas Edison designed and built it - and the original Casadega Cabinet, used in the "Dancing Handkerchief" illusion. This was the first donation accepted by the Smithsonian in the field of magic.

== See also ==
- List of magic museums
