= David Copperfield's laser illusion =

Illusion by David Copperfield

Illusionist David Copperfield performing the Laser illusion on the 2001 CBS television special Copperfield: Tornado of Fire

David Copperfield's laser illusion is an illusion performed by David Copperfield in several magic shows. The magician or his assistant is cut by a "laser" into two or more parts and starts walking.

== Illusion description ==
As performed during the 2001 TV special Copperfield: Tornado of Fire, Copperfield was "cut in half" by his assistant or assistants, wielding the laser beam. Sparks and flames flew where the beam "hits" his body. Copperfield then demonstrated to the audience that he was truly in two pieces by lowering the top half of his body onto a chair while the lower half of his body (waist down) remained visibly standing. As the finale, Copperfield, still separated from the waist, held on to his legs as he walked and hopped to the front of the stage, where he lifted the upper half of his body onto the bottom half and "re-connected" himself.

The illusion is not currently featured in the live performances of David Copperfield, who rotates effects in and out of his repertoire as new material evolves and is developed.

== See also ==
- David Copperfield's flying illusion
- Death Saw
- List of magic tricks
- Portal (magic trick)
- Squeeze box (magic trick)
- Walking through the Great Wall of China
