= Arthur Kurzweil =

American writer

Arthur Kurzweil (born 1951) is an American author, educator, editor, writer, publisher, and illusionist.

Kurzweil was born in New York City. He was raised in East Meadow, New York. He earned a Bachelor of Arts degree from New College at Hofstra University in 1971 and a Master of Library Science from Florida State University in 1972.

As a scholar-in-residence and guest speaker in synagogues and other Jewish organizations in the United States, as well as through the books he has written on Judaism, the Torah, Kabbalah, the Talmud and Jewish genealogical research, Kurzweil's career has focused on Jewish education. During his 17-year tenure at Jason Aronson Publishers, he commissioned and published over 650 volumes of Jewish interest. Kurzweil has also been editor-in-chief of the Jewish Book Club, president of the Jewish Book Council, and editorial consultant for Jossey-Bass.

Kurzweil's book From Generation to Generation: How to Trace Your Jewish Genealogy and Family History is an introductory guide on the topic. Kurzweil has also authored four books in the for Dummies series: Kabbalah for Dummies "The Talmud for Dummies" The Torah for Dummies and "Jewish History For Dummies" He is also a major contributor to "Judaism All-in-One For Dummies.". His other books are On the Road with Rabbi Steinsaltz, "Pebbles of Wisdom from Rabbi Adin Steinsaltz"" "The Persistence of Memory: My Father's Ukrainian Shtetl"The Encyclopedia of Jewish Genealogy and My Generations: A Course in Jewish Family History, which is commonly used as a textbook at synagogue schools in the United States.

== Career ==
=== In literature ===
==== Author ====
Kurzweil's interest in writing formed early in his childhood. His first article, "Today's Troubled Youth: A Teenager's View", was published at the age of 15. It first appeared in Newsday and became nationally syndicated. It was included in the weekly current events reading supplement then commonly used in public schools in the United States.

Kurzweil spent ten years working as a freelance writer, writing articles for numerous publications including Hadassah, National Jewish Monthly, Moment Magazine and L.I. (Newsday's Sunday magazine). He also contributed articles to The Jewish Almanac (1980), The Jewish Family Book: A Creative Approach to Raising Kids (1981), the three volumes comprising The Jewish Catalog (Jewish Publication Society in 1973, 1976 and 1980, a 1960's style compilation of do-it-yourself guides covering a wide range of topics of interest for Jewish people. Kurzweil contributed to articles about building a personal Jewish library, Judaica philately, and Jewish genealogy.

His interest in genealogy coincided with the release of Alex Haley's book Roots: The Saga of an American Family and Catching the Wave in 1976. He wrote "Past Shock: How One Man Took a Journey Back into His Family's History", a feature article for L.I.. The publication of this article initiated his career as both a professional writer and a public speaker. His weekly column, Finding Jewish Roots, appeared in The Jewish Week, a Jewish newspaper in New York, in 1977 and 1978. In 1979, Kurzweil wrote a cover story for New York magazine, "Hizzoner's Roots", a genealogical study of former New York City Mayor Ed Koch's past.

Motivated by his own confused and inconsistent treatment of New York City's numerous beggars, Kurzweil, in Brother, Can You Spare a Dime: The Treatment of Beggars According to Jewish Tradition, poses 16 questions reflecting his ambivalence on accommodating their seemingly relentless requests for a handout. He then demonstrates how a relative novice can do research to find meaningful answers within the framework of the Jewish tradition.

From Generation to Generation: How to Trace Your Jewish Genealogy and Family History was first published in 1980 and has since been published in a third revised edition. The book provides information on Kurzweil's own family history quest in addition to step-by-step advice on gathering information on one's family history from family members, family papers, Holocaust research, immigration and naturalization records, and online databases, among other sources. A revised and updated version of this book was published by Jossey-Bass in 2004.

After an extended period of time during which Kurzweil's efforts were focused on publishing books by other authors, Kurzweil returned to his own writing, with books such as On the Road with Rabbi Steinsaltz: 25 Years of Pre-Dawn Car Trips, Mind-Blowing Encounters, and Inspiring Conversations with a Man of Wisdom in 2006,Kabbalah for Dummies in 2007 The Torah for Dummies in 2008. The Talmud for Dummies in 2025, "Jewish History For Dummies" in 2026, and was a major contributor to "Judaism All-in-One For Dummies" also in 2026.

In 2009, Jossey-Bass published Pebbles of Wisdom From Rabbi Adin Steinsaltz: Edited and with Notes by Arthur Kurzweil. It includes the rabbi's thoughts on life and spirituality, drawn from more than thirty years of Rabbi Steinsaltz's lectures, writings, interviews, and conversations.

In 2022, Ben Yehuda Press published a memoir by Kurzweil, The Persistence of Memory: My Father's Ukrainian Shtetl--A Holocaust Reckoning. It tells of Kurzweil's travels to the places in Eastern Europe where his family was murdered during the Holocaust, and his efforts to establish relationships with the residents of those towns.

==== Editor ====
Kurzweil's credits as an editor include, Behold a Great Image: The Contemporary Jewish Experience in Photographs in 1978 co-edited with Sharon Strassfeld. The book which was awarded first prize for design at the Philadelphia Book Show, was developed as a fundraising program by a Tzedekah Collective, a grassroots charitable fundraising initiative. The book was the culmination of a national photography project that aimed at capturing the modern Jewish experience. The top three winners received cash prizes, and the proceeds from the book were donated to charity. Other books Kurzweil has edited include The Strife of the Spirit in 1988, On Being Free in 1995 both written by Rabbi Adin Steinsaltz, Best Jewish Writing 2003 and The Hadassah Jewish Family Book of Health and Wellness in 2006.

==== Publisher ====
From 1984 to 2001, Kurzweil acted as Editor-in-chief, publisher and Vice President at Jason Aronson Publishers during which time he published over 650 books on a wide range of topics pertaining to Jewish practice and belief. Authors published by Kurzweil include Adin Steinsaltz, Elie Wiesel, Shlomo Carlebach, Aryeh Kaplan, Joseph B. Soloveitchik, and Zalman Schachter-Shalomi. From 2001 he has served as Judaica Consultant for Jossey-Bass. Jewish book projects that Kurzweil develops for Jossey-Bass are imprinted with the words "An Arthur Kurzweil Book" on each book's title page.

=== Educator ===
I am a Jewish educator; I just do it a little differently, that's all. My hope is to light a spark, to kindle a flame–for a love of Jewish learning–just as I have had for so much of my life. If people can laugh a little and enjoy themselves while they are learning, then I have done my job well. You may know about the Jewish custom of giving students a taste of honey along with their first formal lesson. According to our tradition, learning is supposed to be sweet.

— Arthur Kurzweil

As a speaker, teacher, and scholar-in-residence, Kurzweil's teachings have covered various topics of Jewish interest, including the Talmud, Kabbalah, and genealogy. His Kabbalah courses are frequently based upon the contemporary book by Rabbi Adin Steinsaltz, The Thirteen Petalled Rose: A Discourse on the Essence of Jewish Existence and Belief, which he has stated has had more influence on his life than any other book.

Among the various forums at which Kurzweil has lectured and taught are Jewish educator conferences, such as the Conference for Alternatives in Jewish Education (CAJE), retreat centers, such as Elat Chayyim and the Isabella Freedman Jewish Retreat Center, The Aleph Society where he was the acting coordinator for the Talmud Circle Project, synagogues, schools, Jewish community centers, teacher conferences, and university groups, both in the United States and abroad. As a lecturer and teacher, Kurzweil has been credited as "one individual who has made a major contribution to the resurgence in adult Jewish education."

=== Genealogist ===
Kurzweil co-founded the first Jewish Genealogical Society in 1977 and was co-publisher with Steven W. Siegel of Toledot: The Journal of Jewish Genealogy (1977–1982). There are now over 80 Jewish Genealogical Societies worldwide.

In 1999, Kurzweil was honored with a Lifetime Achievement Award from the International Association of Jewish Genealogical Societies (IAJGS) His commemorative plaque read:

"In recognition of pioneering work in Jewish genealogy. Despite the historical challenges of community destruction, diaspora, and the Holocaust, this work demonstrated that research into Jewish family history is possible. It has served as a source of inspiration for Jewish genealogists and for the establishment of Jewish genealogical societies worldwide."

Kurzweil serves on the Honorary Advisory Board for the International Institute for Jewish Genealogy (IIJG) and also heads a working group that is developing ethical standards for Jewish genealogy. The IIJG is committed to developing Jewish genealogy into a recognized academic discipline, within the realm of Jewish Studies and in association with a broad range of other sciences on an interdisciplinary basis.

=== Magician ===
Kurzweil was introduced to magic by his father who took him to a magic shop to help with a third grade school project. His first magic trick, one that transformed a penny into a dime, was purchased for him by his father. Kurzweil belongs to the Society of American Magicians as well as the International Brotherhood of Magicians. Inspired by Project Magic, an effort to encourage physical therapists to use magic tricks as part of therapy founded by magician David Copperfield, Kurzweil has spent time teaching physical therapists how to use magic tricks as a rehabilitative tool.

Although the Torah and Jewish authorities specifically prohibits "supernatural magic", tricks which rely upon sleight-of-hand and misdirection to fool the eye are permitted. Since 2004, Kurzweil has performed a Jewish-themed magic show, "Searching for God in a Magic Shop", that combines magic tricks and illusions with a spiritual message. Of his presentation, Kurzweil states,

It's not a magic show at all, but a discussion of one of the most profound and important ideas in all of Jewish thought. All that God does is for the good even though we, his human audience, may not see it—because we don't see everything. The audience doesn't see everything—that's the human predicament. Accepting the notion of "gam zu l'tovah" (an idiomatic Aramaic expression taught in the Talmud meaning "Everything is for the best") has transformed my life.

== Awards ==
- The Distinguished Humanitarian Award from the Melton Center for Jewish Studies at Ohio State University.
- Lifetime Achievement Award from the International Association of Jewish Genealogical Societies.
- Beta Phi Mu, the international honor society for library & information science and information technology.

== Bibliography ==
- The Kurzweil Family History and Genealogy (1976)
- Behold a Great Image: The Contemporary Jewish Experience in Photographs (Co-editor) (1978)
- My Generations: A Course in Jewish Family History (1984)
- Kurzweil, Arthur; Weiner, Miriam, eds. (1991). The Encyclopedia of Jewish Genealogy. Northvale, NJ: J. Aronson. ISBN 978-0-87-668835-9. OCLC 609144865.
- Words to Live by: Selected Writings (Editor) (1995)
- Best Jewish Writing (Editor) (2003)
- From Generation to Generation: How to Trace Your Jewish Genealogy and Family History (2004)
- On the Road with Rabbi Steinsaltz: 25 Years of Pre-Dawn Car Trips, Mind-Blowing Encounters, and Inspiring Conversations with a Man of Wisdom (2006)
- Kabbalah For Dummies (2007)
- The Torah For Dummies (2008)
- The Talmud for Dummies (2025)
- Jewish History For Dummies (2026)
- Pebbles of Wisdom from Rabbi Adin Steinsaltz: Collected and with Notes by Arthur Kurzweil (2009)
- The Persistence of Memory: My Father's Ukrainian Shtetl--A Holocaust Reckoning (2022)

== Articles ==
- "A Conversation with Leonard Cohen" The Jewish Book News (1994)
- "A Conversation about Jewish Spirituality with Rabbi Adin Steinsaltz" Jewish Spirituality: The Magazine, (January 2004)
- "Brother, Can You Spare a Dime? The Treatment of Beggars According to Jewish Tradition" Gym Shoes and Irises by Danny Siegel (Town Press, 1987)
- "Genealogy as a Spiritual Pilgrimage" from the Malcolm R. Stern Memorial Lecture given at the 14th Summer Seminar on Jewish Genealogy, Washington, DC, (June 28, 1995)
- "Project Magic" Genii: The Conjurors' Magazine, (Vol. 66, No. 1, January 2003)
