= Norman Bigelow =

American magician and illusionist

Norman Bigelow (August 12, 1944 – August 16, 2015) was an American illusionist. He has been described by the Society of American Magicians as "one of America’s leading escape artists".

== Biography ==
Trained as a locksmith and a wood-worker, as a young man Bigelow became the apprentice of Frank Renaud (1890-1965), who performed as an acrobat and escape artist under the stage name of The Great Reno. From 1972, Bigelow started performing solo shows of escapology. He became well-known in that field, and wrote several books and articles. He agreed to let David Copperfield perform one of his tricks in television. He died of leukemia in 2015 after a long illness.

Bigelow devoted considerable time to study the techniques of Harry Houdini and was advertised as "Houdini reincarnated" for his ability to perform some of the same tricks. He was among those who promoted the theory that Houdini’s death was not an accident, but a murder. To prove his theory, Bigelow tried to obtain in 1985 Houdini’s original medical records, but was told they no longer existed. Bigelow also became controversial by claiming that some of Houdini’s secrets might be hidden in the monument marking his grave in the Machpelah Cemetery (Queens). The theory was never proved, but led to vandalism of the monument by some who hoped to find secret documents there.

== Main tricks ==
Bigelow’s main escape tricks were called Trial by Fire, The Straight Jacket Escape, and The Doors of Death.

In Trial by Fire (also known as Fire Escape), Bigelow asked an assistant to handcuff him to a table before a ramp of gunpowder leading up to his face. He had to escape the handcuffs quickly and jump away before the explosion took place. The Straitjacket was a classical escape trick, that Bigelow performed either lying on the floor or suspended. The Doors (or Board) of Death involved a medieval-like torture board from which Bigelow escaped avoiding to be hit by sharp spikes. These tricks were dangerous, and Bigelow ended up in hospitals more than once.

Bigelow also asked to be locked in a safe in a building just about to be demolished, and escaped on time. The latter was the trick borrowed by David Copperfield for his TV show.
