= Arun Loganathan =

Arun Loganthan
- Born: 1 July 1983 (age 43)
- Occupation: Mentalist
- Years active: 2000-present
- Website: www.arunthementalist.com

Arun Loganathan (born 1 July 1983) is an Indian mentalist, escape artist and certified master hypnotist. He is the first Indian to win the Medal of Merlin in an International Arena.

== Early life ==
Arun was born and brought up in Chennai, India. As a small child, he contracted polio.

== Career ==
He is a lifetime member of the International Magicians Society. He has been performing in various stages for the past 17 years across internationally. He is a qualified law and management graduate.

== Recognition ==
He was the first Indian to win the Medal of Merlin Best Close-up Magic, conducted in Bangkok in 2013. He was the second runner up in Close-up Magic conducted in Bangalore in 2012.
