= Herbert L. Becker =

American magician (born 1951)

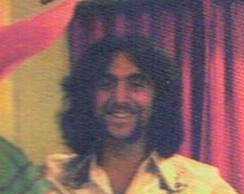
- Herbert Becker in 1975
- Born: Herbert Lawrence Becker; August 12, 1955 (age 71); Hollywood, Florida
- Occupations: Magician, escapologist, stunt performer, author, businessman
- Height: 5 ft 10 in (178 cm)
- Spouse: Delta Burke (married 1978-1978) Malka Becker (married 1989-1999) Shelly Becker (married 1999-2009) Marjorie Dill Becker (married 2019-2022)
- Children: 7 Children

Herbert Lawrence Becker (born August 12, 1951) is an American former magician, escapologist, stunt performer, author, and businessman. As a magician, Becker performed as Kardeen.

== Biography ==
=== Early life ===
Herbert Lawrence Becker was born in Hollywood, Florida in 1951.

==== Magic ====
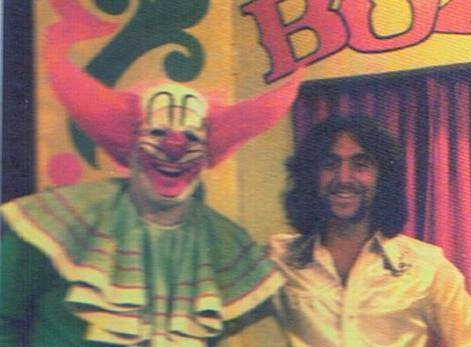
Herbert Becker (right) with Bozo the Clown in 1975

Becker performed under the name "The Kardeen Brothers" with Marc Nicols. Later, he worked solo as "The Great Kardeen". Kardeen bested then replaced Harry Houdini as the Worlds Fastest Escape Artist in the Guinness Book of World Records. He helped open the first Guinness Museums, toured with Guinness on Parade and performed at the Steel Pier and Radio City Music Hall (1976) with the Guinness show. As a magician, Becker toured worldwide until he retired in 1978. Becker appeared as himself (a magician) on the Orlando television program Bozo the Clown appearing weekly and The Maury Povich Show (2001).

In his book All the Secrets of Magic Revealed: The Tricks and Illusions of the World's Greatest Magicians, Becker explained how magicians such as Harry Houdini, David Copperfield, Doug Henning, and Siegfried and Roy created some of their most famous illusions, to the consternation of his colleagues. Becker caused more unhappiness among magicians when he appeared on the television talk show of Maury Povich in March 1997 and exposed the secrets behind such well-known magic tricks as sawing a person in half. Becker has written Magic Secrets and So That's How They Do It.

==== Business and consulting ====
Becker was chief executive officer of Barclay Road, a boutique book publishing house. Becker retired from as CEO in July 2008, but continued as an advisor until the company ceased operations.

=== Litigation ===
Becker has been involved in legal disputes with David Copperfield. Copperfield sued Becker in an attempt to prevent publication of All the Secrets of Magic Revealed: The Tricks and Illusions of the World's Greatest Magicians (Lifetime Books, Inc. (March 11, 1997); ISBN 978-0-8119-0822-1) which Copperfield maintained revealed some of Copperfield's secrets. Becker then sued his publisher, Lifetime Books, for purportedly colluding with Copperfield to remove details of Copperfield's illusions.

== Publications ==
Becker is the author of Typing by Design, an instructional typing text published by McGraw-Hill in 1982. The book was used in educational and business training contexts and was later distributed through business education channels, including Pitman Business Education.

== Other Books ==
- 101 Greatest Magic Secrets Exposed, Citadel (March 2002); ISBN 978-0-8065-2154-1
- All the Secrets of Magic Revealed: The Tricks and Illusions of the World's Greatest Magicians, Lifetime Books, Inc. (March 11, 1997); ISBN 978-0-8119-0822-1
- More Magic Secrets, Lifetime Books, Inc. January 1997 ISBN 1-890167-00-2
- The Art of Retail As Told by the World's Leader in Retail Management and Turn Around Expert ISBN 978-0811900072
- John Lennon: Between the Lines, Lifetime Books, Inc. October 1997 ISBN 978-1-890167-01-1
- The magic secrets of David Blaine: The street magician revealed, Lifetime Books, Inc. 2007 (English and French Edition)ISBN 9780811912341 ISBN 0811912345
- Magic Hands: Professional Card Trick Secrets Revealed, Cedar Fort, Inc (April 11, 2017) ISBN 978-1462120598
