= John Bundy =

American magician

John Bundy is an American magician and magic consultant based in South Plainfield, New Jersey. He is owner of John Bundy Productions, a company that produces shows for theme parks and corporate events and provides technical advice for television, movies and stage shows. As a performer, Bundy specialises in magic with a humorous edge and in shows with horror and Halloween themes. For some of his performances he assumes the alias of Wacky Dracky, a spoof vampire character.

Bundy began performing as a magician while studying theatre at Rider University in New Jersey. After graduating in 1975 he worked in a magic shop before setting up John Bundy Productions in 1982 to produce magic shows as marketing events for shopping centres. In 1994 he was joined by an assistant named Morgan who has become a long-term performing partner. The pair generally work under the billing of "John Bundy and Morgan". John Bundy Productions has also launched Morgan as a solo escapology act under the name "Morgan the Escapist".

John Bundy and Morgan were featured in Paramount Picture's 2010 release Morning Glory. Their television credits that include two appearances on the Late Show with David Letterman, Ricki Lake, the Gordon Elliott Show and The Fox Kids Network as well as several appearances in commercials. Bundy and his work have featured in various industry periodicals and he was the subject of a cover feature for the October 2005 issue of Magic magazine, which described him as "Halloween magic's greatest innovator".
