= Morgan the Escapist =

Morgan the Escapist is a magic performer specialising in escapology. She is based in South Plainfield, New Jersey, USA, and often works with the magician John Bundy. She has also had careers as a theatrical designer and script writer. In October 2009, she received the title "Best female escape artist" at the World Magic Awards.

== Biography ==
Morgan has stated that her magic career owes a lot to early inspiration drawn from seeing Dorothy Dietrich perform on television. After an education in theatre and graphic arts, Morgan worked in a touring magic show and then in a professional theatre. In addition to performing and stage managing at the theater she learned to direct and was the resident graphic artist. In 1994, she was chosen to study at the Jim Henson Studios in New York. The same year she met Bundy and later became his assistant in his successful and long-running show, Spooktackular. She then developed an escape-based act in her own right whilst continuing her successful involvement in Bundy's productions. Her signature tricks include the Table of Death.

She has appeared on national network television in the US and for three years in succession she was invited to star in the annual Hong Kong Magic Festival. She received the title "Best female escape artist" at a ceremony for the World Magic Awards hosted by Robert Wagner and Jill St. John in Santa Monica, California, on 10 October 2009. The event included a performance by Morgan of the Table of Death. The evening was recorded for television.

She is credited as contributing to the book The Escape Biz: Volume 2 by Steve Baker and Dean Carnegie.

== Additional achievements ==
Morgan is an accomplished martial artist, holding a 2nd degree Black Belt in Tang Soo Do. She was the head writer on an Emmy award winning children’s TV show and the make-up artist for a midnight horror talk show.
