= David Copperfield: An Intimate Evening of Grand Illusion =

Tour by American illusionist David Copperfield

David Copperfield: An Intimate Evening Of Grand Illusion is a tour made by American illusionist David Copperfield. The tour began in 2003 and as of 2020, was running at the David Copperfield Theater at the MGM Grand Hotel and Casino in Las Vegas, and around the United States. The tour paused in 2020 due to a crew member testing positive for COVID-19.

== Setlist ==
=== 2003–2007 ===
1. Motorcycle Shadow Box
2. Thru Steel
3. Baby Illusion
4. Squeezebox
5. Anthrax
6. Lotto Prediction
7. Slo-Mo Duck
8. Portal
9. Thirteen

=== 2007–2014 ===
1. Motorcycle Shadow Box
2. Thru Steel
3. Air Coppers
4. Dancing Ties
5. Squeezebox

Intermission: Fires Of Passion Video

1. Anthrax
2. Lotto Prediction
3. Slo-Mo Duck
4. Floating Rose
5. The Fan
6. Thirteen

=== 2014–2018 ===
1. Motorcycle Shadow Box
2. Marcus Levitation
3. Lincoln Convertible Car Illusion
4. Balloon
5. Words
6. Floating Rose
7. Blu / UFO illusions
8. Email From The Future
9. Frank Appearance

=== 2019-Present ===
1. Motorcycle Shadow Box
2. Marcus Levitation
3. Lincoln Convertible Car Illusion
4. Star Spangled Banner Illusion
5. Words
6. Floating Rose
7. Blu / UFO illusions
8. Email From The Future
9. Frank the T-REX

=== Additional notes ===
- The Baby Illusion was removed around summer–fall 2007.
- The Dancing Ties Illusion was removed around summer 2012 and replaced with the E-mail From the Future Illusion.
- The Lotto Prediction includes the magical appearance of Copperfield's grandfather's 1954 Lincoln Convertible. It may not be performed on some nights due to stage space or limited backstage room.
- Portal was out of the show in the summer of 2007, returned in the winter of 2007, left in the spring of 2008, and hasn't been performed since. The Fan, an illusion from Copperfield's special "Unexplained Forces" in 1995, replaced Portal. Thirteen was removed around late 2014 and was replaced by a Jurassic Park scale illusion (Frank Appearance).
- Thru Steel, Baby Illusion, Anthrax, Lotto Prediction/Lincoln Convertible Car Illusion, Marcus Levitation, Balloon, Words, Blu/UFO Illusion, E-mail From the Future, and Frank Appearance haven't yet been performed in Copperfield's TV specials.
