= Joanie Spina =

American magician

- Born: Joanie Spina; August 4, 1953; Boston, Massachusetts, United States
- Died: August 17, 2014 (aged 61); Houston, Texas, United States
- Occupations: Dancer, choreographer, magician and director
- Years active: 1985–2014

Joanie Spina (August 4, 1953 – August 17, 2014) was an American dancer, choreographer, magician and director who achieved prominence through her work with the illusionist David Copperfield.

== Early life and beginnings of career ==
Spina grew up in the town of Woburn, near Boston, Massachusetts. She first began dancing as a child but gave up when she was just 11. Later in life, at the age of 26, while working in a menial bar job, she returned to dance as a means to lose weight.

Taking ballet and jazz classes helped her decide that her vocation lay in the performing arts.

She then began acting and taking voice classes as well. Although told she was too old to be attempting to begin a career as a performer she persevered on the basis that she could at least teach. In the following two years she danced with a few local companies in the Boston area and then moved to New York City.

== Magic career ==
In January 1985, while looking for the next step in her career, Spina answered a job posting for a dancer in a show with "an international stage and television star". The star turned out to be magician David Copperfield, who hired her. She worked for Copperfield for the next eleven years, until 1996, spending eight-and-a-half of them as his lead assistant. She also became his choreographer and co-director. Her work included choreographing ten of Copperfield's nineteen CBS television specials, beginning with The Magic of David Copperfield VIII: Walking Through the Great Wall of China (March 14, 1986), in which she was credited as assistant choreographer, and his show Dreams and Nightmares, which ran at the Martin Beck Theatre for twenty-five days between December 5 and 29, 1996. Among the routines to which Spina contributed were Copperfield's "Brazilian Water Levitation", included in his 1991 special, and his signature "Flying" illusion, created by John Gaughan and included in his 1992 special.

She appeared as a lead dancer and assistant in the "Origami" illusion in the 1989 television special Explosive Encounter and the "Slicer" illusion in the 1990 special The Niagara Falls Challenge.

In 2000 Spina left Copperfield's team and developed her own solo magic act, which she performed in locations including Las Vegas, Atlantic City and the Bahamas. She withdrew from performing and began to concentrate on a directing career. Her clients included Mark Kalin and Jinger, Princess Tenko, Tim Kole (the son of André Kole), Melinda Saxe, Jeff Hobson, Juliana Chen, The Spencers, Dirk Arthur, and Lawrence & Priscilla.

During Spina's later years, she lived in Las Vegas and traveled extensively to work on various projects. In addition to her directing work she launched Roxie Video Productions.

She released a three-volume VHS set entitled Joanie Spina: Get Your Act Together on which she offered advice on stagecraft, routining, working with assistants, movement, and character development.

Spina penned a column for MAGIC Magazine in which she demonstrated techniques for magicians to improve their choreography and staging. Her columns appeared from January 2011 as video lessons on the iPad edition of the magazine.

== Death ==
Joanie suffered from pulmonary fibrosis and had been treated for cancer. In 2014 she moved from Las Vegas to Houston to await a lung and liver transplant.

Spina died on August 17, 2014, at the age of 61.
