= Table of death =

The table of death is a predicament escape that may be regarded as a magic trick or an act of escapology.

== Description ==
The apparatus consists of a substantial table with an array of menacing metal spikes suspended above it. The basic premise is that the performer will be restrained on the table and must escape before the spikes are released and allowed to fall. A curtain is drawn around the apparatus to obscure the performer from view while the escape is attempted. The sequence of events is arranged so that it initially appears the spikes fall before the performer has had time to get out from under them; however, the curtain is then pulled back to reveal the performer free and unharmed. Sometimes a scrim is used instead of a curtain and, with back lighting, it is arranged that the audience see the silhouetted shadow of the performer struggling to escape before the spikes fall.

The exact design varies slightly from one example to another but the basic arrangement remains constant. The spikes are supported from a frame attached to the table, which also serves to guide them as they are raised and dropped. There is generally some form of pulley or winch mechanism to raise the spikes, which are genuine and heavy. The table itself generally has an array of holes that match the layout of the spikes, so that the spikes protrude through the table when they drop. The performer lies on his or her back on the table and is restrained with a variety of chains, cuffs and manacles.

One significant way in which different versions vary is in the arrangement for releasing the spikes for their lethal drop. This depends on the story that is built around the trick as part of the performance. Sometimes it is presented as having a timing device automatically release the spikes, while other performers have their assistants appear to cut through a securing cable or merely let go of the cable at the appropriate moment. In many performances, the rope which supports the spikes in their raised position is set alight, releasing the spikes when it has apparently burned through to the point where it no longer has the strength to support the weight of the spikes.

== History ==
The modern incarnation of the trick is widely credited to magician André Kole. However, there are also references to it having first appeared in the 1930s. At least one source credits it to "W. Jeans, A Zagorsky & Andre Kole". This might be a reference to Walter Jeans (1877–1942) who created a trick called the "Death of Coira", which has been described as a forerunner of the Table of Death.

The Table of Death was one of the tricks for which a method was supposedly revealed in the Fox network's Masked Magician series. This occurred despite a lawsuit brought by André Kole against the show's makers in an effort to stop them. The show failed to reveal a number of features and methods that are used in contemporary versions of the trick, including methods for escaping from restraints and the method for showing the performer's silhouette on a scrim.

== Performers ==
The following magicians and escape artists are known to have performed this trick:

- André Kole
- Doug Henning
- Ariann Black
- Chris Korn (in season 1 of The Magicians)
- David Copperfield
- Jay Owenhouse
- Joe Labero
- Morgan the Escapist
- John Hirokawa
- Mark Kalin
- Penn & Teller (one method for this trick is exposed in their movie Penn & Teller Get Killed )
- Sittah
- Stephen Mulhern
- John T. Sheets
