= Congressional Resolution 642 =

US bill on magic

- Long title: Congressional Resolution 642
- Nicknames: 747delta...
- Enacted by: the 114th United States Congress

Legislative history
- Introduced in the House by Pete Sessions (R–TX) on 14 March 2016; Committee consideration by United States House Committee on Oversight and Government Reform

Congressional Resolution 642 is a proposed bill, introduced to the United States House Committee on Oversight and Government Reform by Pete Sessions on 14 March 2016, to help preserve, protect, and promote magic as an art form. The movement is publicly headed by Las Vegas magician David Copperfield and is embodied by various magic organisations, including the Society of American Magicians and the International Brotherhood of Magicians, and by many politicians. The bill demands that the United States House of Representatives:

(1) recognizes magic as a rare and valuable art form and national treasure;
(2) takes magicians seriously;
(3) supports efforts to make certain that magic is preserved, understood, and promulgated

== Support ==
=== Magicians ===
- Brian Brushwood
- Chris Kenner
- David Copperfield - "Even for me today, magic, as an artform, has a rare and unique power to it. It inspires us to question the things that we were told impossible, and to push the limits of our own abilities."
- David Blaine - "Magic is an art where you use sleight of hand or illusion to create wonder. We are all capable of infinitely more than we believe."
- Justin Willman
- Steve Cohen

=== Politicians ===
- Charlie Dent
- Eric Hogue – Mayor of Wylie, Texas - "The art of magic has a positive impact on so many lives. Learning magic empowered me to face my fears, overcome challenges, and pursue my passions."
- Ken Buck
- Michael Simpson
- Pat Meehan
- Pete Sessions
- Steve Stivers
