= Curtis Lovell II =

American illusionist and escape artist

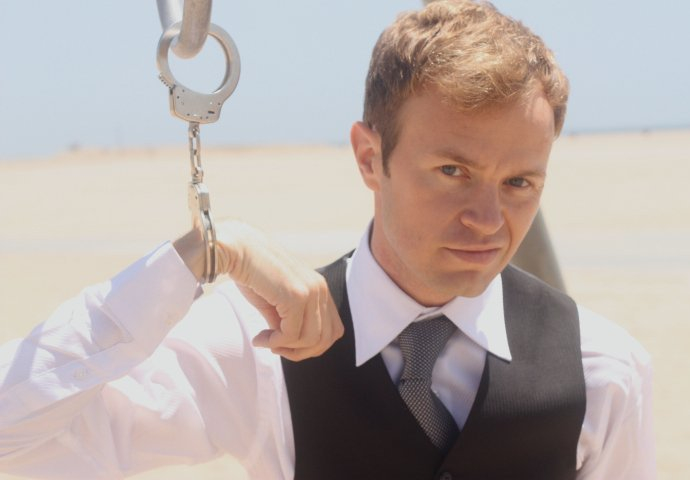
- Occupations: magician, escapologist, stunt performer, illusionist
- Website: www.curtislovell.com

Curtis Lovell II is an American illusionist and escape artist. He is known for his high-profile escape performances and his events for corporations. The Washington Times interviewed him for a political piece subtitled "Houdini Factor". He was referred to in an article in weekly entertainment newspaper Citizen LA as "the premiere [sic] escape artist of our time." He has also received coverage for his stunts, including a performance with actor Tony Curtis and Larry King.

== Career ==
When Lovell was seven, his father performed a magic trick by pulling a coin from the young boy's ear. This inspired him to become a magical entertainer. At an early age, Lovell mastered the art of close up magic.

In the Death Trap, created for a nightlife/entertainment complex in Singapore, Lovell attracted thousands of spectators and media on 18 subsequent nights when he was chained up and lowered into the Singapore River. He has performed Houdini's Cube of Death trick hundreds of times, including 29 times at a shopping entertainment complex in the Philippines, as well as for radio and Television Publicity for USA Network and News Radio.

Lovell was buried alive during a performance on Halloween night 2008 and 2012. The stunt attracted over 2000 spectators, as well as CBS and KCAL9 News stations, local newspapers, and radio shows including Casey Kasem's Top 20.

He has appeared as a guest on television programs such as: Spike TV for MANSWERS, where he explained how to escape from handcuffs. He appeared on the reality show The Simple Life on E! Entertainment to cut Paris Hilton in half.

== Television appearances ==
2014 OVATION TV: The Art of: Magic

2012–2013 kuperman.tv: Living in La La Land is a 53-episode docu-reality show following the journey of six Israeli performing artists, extremely famous in their own country, to Los Angeles in order to break into the international music market. Curtis Lovell guest appears on six episodes as a mentor, instructor, consultant to a musical artist. Also Lovell performs escapes and illusions.

2009 MYNETWORK-TV: MASTERS OF ILLUSION Four-minute guest appearance where Lovell performed a water escape.

2006 E! ENTERTAINMENT: THE SIMPLE LIFE - WITH PARIS HILTON Season 4 - "Murray Family" The concept was themed around auditioning entertainers for a party that Paris was throwing. Lovell cut Paris in half and was hired back to perform for the party.

2007 USA NETWORK: CHARACTER ROAD TRIP Five-minute spotlight around Lovell and his Cube of Death escape.

2007 SPIKE TV: MANSWERS Season 1 - "How to escape from handcuffs" Lovell explained the art of escaping from police handcuffs.

2008 A&E: GENE SIMMONS FAMILY JEWELS MARCH Season 3 - Season Premier Lovell made a cameo appearance at the veterinarian hospital with his pet Chinchilla and interacted with Gene Simmons.

2007 RHEELZ CHANNEL: DAILIES Lovell shared his insight on the movie The Prestige.

== Show accomplishments ==
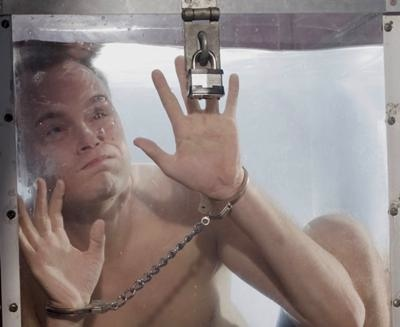
Curtis Lovell II - shackled, cuffed and locked in a clear box filled with water - The Cube of Death

February, 2012 -Guard A Heart -Pre-Oscar fundraiser honoring Larry King - Hollywood California

Guard A Heart presented the Guardian of Hearts award to Larry King in recognition of his contribution to saving lives through the Larry King Cardiac Foundation. The Award was presented at a pre-Oscar party at the Avalon Ballroom in Hollywood on February 25, 2012. The evening included performances by variety of entertainers and acts such as Midnight Red, Josh Sussman, Savannah Robison and International Escape Artist Curtis Lovell II. Lovell, performed a Houdini style escape as an opening act for Larry King and his guests.

October, 2009 – U.S. Military Challenge - California
Lovell was challenged by the United States Marines to an escape. Lovell accepted their challenge and was strapped into a regulation straitjacket by two U.S. military officers in front of thousands of spectators. It took Lovell over 3 minutes to free himself from the straitjacket. The challenge was part of The City of Grand Terrace, California, Halloween Haunt in Richard Rollins Park.

June, 2009 - The Magic of Tony Curtis - California
Produced by the Jules Verne Festival, where 1950s movie actor Tony Curtis was presented the "Legendarie award". As a show opener, Lovell recreated the water escape that Tony Curtis performed in the movie Houdini. A VIP dinner at the Los Angeles Athletic Club followed, where Curtis strapped Lovell into a straitjacket in front of several hundred people.

2008 Buried Alive - California

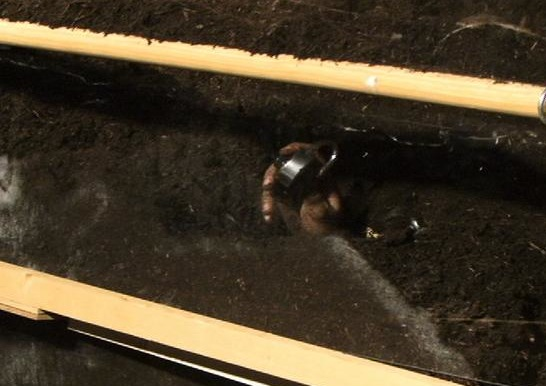
Curtis Lovell II - buried Alive

Successfully escaped being buried alive on Halloween evening 2008. He was shackled and locked into a coffin by a local police officer. Then over 1,000 pounds of dirt was poured on the coffin. It took Lovell 16 minutes to successfully escape. The successful attempt echoed an escape performend by Harry Houdini. This escape received coverage from CBS, KCAL9, and I.E Weekly.

2006 The Death Trap - Singapore
Lovell performed 18 magic escape shows for an entertainment complex in Singapore. Lovell was chained and shackled onto two large steel plates and lowered into the Singapore river by a crane. The goal was to gain publicity for the entertainment complex, and Lovell attracted the attention of 2,500 guests nightly, five major print organizations, three news networks, an international news station and radio stations.

2006 Escape From Reality - Philippines
Lovell performed 29 shows at a shopping mall complex based on the theme of escaping fears and defying death. Lovell performed an effect similar to Houdini's water torture cell, called the Cube of Death. Lovell attracted thousands of guests nightly, sometimes more than 4,000 onlookers.

=== 2007 Public Challenges ===
The David Blaine Challenge Psychic John Edward Challenge. Lovell publicly challenged Blaine to a magic duel. Lovell received national press coverage including: television, print, internet, radio and on major blogs and chat rooms.

=== Cryonics ===
Lovell is signed up for cryonic suspension with the American Cryonics Society.

=== DVD ===
POOF! You’re a magician ~Learn magic with everyday objects is an instructional DVD that stars Lovell teaching magic to the viewers.
