= Antony Britton =

British escapologist

- Born: Bradford, England
- Occupations: Escapologist, stunt performer
- Years active: 2012–present
- Website: https://www.antonybritton.com

Antony Britton is a British escapologist and stunt performer. He has performed a series of large scale spectacular stunts done for television and charity. Britton first attracted notice in Wakefield, England in a 2012 stunt. He went on to perform a series of stunts for charity, and in 2014 thousands turned out in Bradford city centre to watch him attempt the inverted straitjacket escape. In 2015 he attempted the Buried Alive escape challenge, making him the third person to have attempted the routine in 100 years. He was unsuccessful and had to be rescued.

== Early life ==
Britton was born in Saltaire, Bradford, England, and has one brother and an older sister. He went to Wycliffe Middle School in Saltaire and Beckfoot School in Bingley. At a young age he was diagnosed with dyslexia. Britton trained as a welder whilst performing escapes, he would be seen by the public been chained, padlocked and handcuffed before jumping in the canals of Saltaire and Bingley.

Britton performed his escapes in private at meetings in old mills around the Yorkshire area until 2012 when he joined forces with a team of friends, where he wanted to bring hard hitting entertainment to the public for free due to the Great Recession as well as raising money for national charities.

== Media ==
In 2015, Britton attempted to escape from a grave in the Buried Alive challenge, made famous by Houdini in 1915. At the time, he was thought to be only the third person to have attempted this escape. Britton failed to escape and lost consciousness, requiring him to be dug out by assistants and resuscitated. He described a near-death experience to reporters.

== Guinness World Record ==
In October 2016 Antony attempted to break a Guinness World Record at Wandle Park, Croydon by running the "Longest Distance Full-Body Burn without Oxygen". He succeeded in breaking the record, however Guinness did not accept that attempt due to a technicality.

However, he tried again on Friday 13 October 2017 at Huddersfield Rugby Union Club where he broke not one record, but two:

- Fastest 100 m sprint (full body burn, without oxygen)
- Longest distance run (full-body burn, without oxygen)

== Known escapes ==
- Buried Alive
- Inverted straitjacket escape
- Lucifer’s Chamber
- Exploding Crate
- Chinese Water Torture Cell
