= Bill Shirk =

American radio broadcaster (born 1945)

- Born: William Shirk; May 3, 1945 (age 80); Indianapolis, Indiana, U.S.
- Occupations: Illusionist, magician, escapologist, stunt performer, actor, radio personality
- Years active: 1976–current

Bill Shirk (born May 3, 1945, in Indianapolis, Indiana) is an American escape artist, radio personality, broadcast entrepreneur and actor.

== Biography ==
=== Radio broadcasting ===
Shirk graduated from Ball State University in 1967 with a Bachelor of Science degree in education.

Shirk has owned and started radio stations in Muncie, Indianapolis, Cloverdale and Lebanon, Indiana.

Shirk was the station manager, sales manager, program director, production manager and afternoon disc jockey on WERK Radio, in Muncie, Indiana, from 1968 to 1972. Shirk became the general manager and a DJ at WXLW in Indianapolis in 1972 and then became the owner in 1974 and in 1991 added WHHH-FM, Hot 96.3 as owner and DJ. Currently, he is the president and CEO of Hoosier Broadcasting Corporation.

=== Escape artist ===
While playing a major role in Indianapolis radio during the 1970s, 1980s and 1990s and early 2000s, Shirk was also making his mark in the escape artist industry.

Between 1976 and 1980, Shirk set eight world records, including the fastest time to escape from a straitjacket (4.53 seconds) and worlds fastest jail break.

In 1977, Shirk was buried alive for 79 hours with a ten-foot python, two tarantulas and a rattlesnake, which received worldwide coverage and a donation from President Jimmy Carter. He raised $10,000 for the Marion County Association for Retarded Citizens.

In 1983, Shirk starred as himself in the movie The Escapist. The film revolved around his fictionalized efforts to save his radio station from a greedy corporation and featured several of his highly publicized stunts, including a straitjacket escape while hanging upside down from a helicopter 1600 feet in the air.

In 1992, Shirk was buried alive under seven tons of dirt and cement in a Plexiglas coffin, which collapsed and almost took Shirk's life. This was performed on the 66th anniversary of Harry Houdini's death, who considered the stunt too dangerous after nearly losing his life to it in 1915, as well as on the 2nd anniversary of the death of Joe Burrus, an amateur escape artist who was killed in 1990 under the same circumstances as Shirk.
