= John Clempert =

Russian escape artist

John Clempert (April 19, 1878 – May 1940) was a Russian escape artist who became famous for his hanging tricks and for a legal dispute with Harry Houdini.

== Early career ==
Clempert was born in Siberia on April 19, 1878, in a city Edwin A. Dawes indicated as “Poletavarr.” He started working in Farroni's Circus as a wrestler, but became famous as “The Man They Cannot Hang” for the acts of escapology he performed after an assistant had hung him.

In 1903, one of his hanging performances failed in Rochester, New York, and the accident nearly cost Clempert his life. He abandoned the hanging tricks and joined the Warren American Circus, touring India and the Middle East.

== Legal dispute with Houdini ==
The new acts Clempert performed were inspired by Houdini. He performed escapology acts involving handcuffs and chains, and advertised himself as “The Handcuff and Siberian Gaol Breaker.” He also believed he had figured out how Houdini performed his “Milk Can Escape,” in which he escaped from a large, water-filled milk can. He started performing his own version of the Milk Can Escape in the Warren shows, including in England. Houdini argued that the act was protected by copyright and sued Clempert.

Reportedly, Houdini was so upset, that when he heard that Clempert had been previously known as “The Man They Cannot Hang,” he commented, “Perhaps this is a pity, for when one man gets work on another’s reputation and has the impudence to rub the facts home by exposing the methods of the originator, words are useless.” The case was settled in 1906, with Clempert apologizing to Houdini.

== Late career ==
Dawes wrote that Clempert rarely performed after losing his court case with Houdini, and only resumed his career in 1927, after Houdini's death in 1926. However, in 2018, British author Derek Tait reported in his book, The Great Illusionists, that he had found evidence in British daily newspapers of regular performances which Clempert and his wife Nellie offered throughout Great Britain between 1907 and 1914. Tait mentioned an act called “Escape from a Submarine,” a variation of Houdini's Milk Can Escape different enough to avoid copyright problems, and media coverage of Clempert's arrest in London on April 13, 1909, when the police prevented him from jumping handcuffed from the Tower Bridge.

There is also evidence in Houdini's papers that he continued to keep watch on Clempert, and he complained in 1910 that Clempert's escape acts were still too similar to his own. In 1912, after Houdini had appeared on stage seated in the pilot's seat of a real airplane, Clempert promptly did the same. Houdini's lawyers, however, found no grounds for suing Clempert again.

Tait found fewer references to Clempert in British media after World War I, but one indicated that he was still performing during the 1930s. Clempert died in the month of May 1940, but neither Tait nor Dawes were able to find the exact date.

Clempert and Nellie had four children, David, Maurice, Zelda, and Aaron. Zelda became a screenwriter and playwright under the name Zelda Davees.
