= André Kole =

American magician and writer (1936–2022)

- Born: Robert J. Gurtler Jr. September 30, 1936
- Died: October 17, 2022 (aged 86); Albany, Oregon, U.S.
- Education: Self-taught
- Occupation(s): Magician, writer
- Known for: Magician and illusionist

André Kole (born Robert J. Gurtler Jr.; September 30, 1936 – October 17, 2022) was an American magician and inventor of magical effects. He was also a committed Christian and a public speaker for the evangelical group Campus Crusade for Christ. He was also known for using his magical knowledge to debunk frauds and hoaxes.

== Early life and career ==
Robert Gurtler was inspired to take up magic at the age of seven after seeing a performance. By the time he was 20, now known as André Kole, he was performing his Table of Death trick on the national network television show You Asked for It.

Among the illusions Kole is credited with devising are the Squeeze Box illusion (licensed to builder John Gaughan), and the Head Mover illusion (as performed by David Copperfield, Tim Kole and Kirby Van Birch).

He also used his magical knowledge and skills to debunk frauds and hoaxes. He was reported in 2003 as offering one million dollars to the Rev. Dr. Donald Stewart if Stewart could prove a statement made in the Jamaican newspaper, the Jamaica Gleaner, that Satan gives supernatural powers.

== Personal life and death ==
Kole's wife, Alice Jean Gurtler, died at age 38 from brain cancer. She was known by the stage name, Aljeana. He noted on his website that he did not perform the classic trick of pulling a rabbit from a hat because he was allergic to rabbits. He is the father of illusionist Tim Kole. Kole died on October 17, 2022, at the age of 86.

== Notable awards ==
In 1955 he received the annual Al Sharpe Award for Originality in Presentation from the Texas Association of Magicians.

== Books ==
Andre Kole and AL Janssen, "MIRACLES OR MAGIC? ESP, Faith Healing, Fortune Telling, Hypnosis, UFO's, Astrology, MindReading, Levitation, Published: Harvest House Publisher (c.1984), ISBN 0-89081-579-8

"André Kole with Jerry MacGregor, Mind Games: Exposing today's psychics, frauds and false spiritual phenomena, pub. Harvest House (February 1998), ISBN 978-1-56507-826-0

André Kole and Terry Holley, Astrology and psychic phenomena, Published: Grand Rapids, Mich., Zondervan, (c.1998), ISBN 0-310-48921-0 (pbk.)
