= Michael Griffin (escape artist) =

American escape artist, magician and illusionist

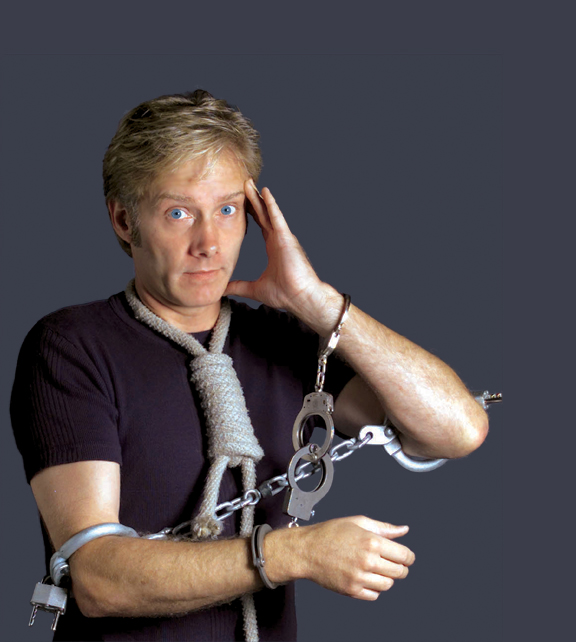
- Born: April 10, 1961 (age 65); Lexington, Kentucky, U.S.
- Occupations: Escape artist, magician
- Years active: 40
- Known for: $100,000 challenge to anyone who can prevent his escape; only performer to win Best Escape Artist at both the World Magic Awards and International Magic Awards
- Notable credit(s): Winner of World Magic Awards (1993, 1999), International Magic Awards, Ultimate Escape Artist; America's Got Talent; Masters of Illusion; Extreme Escapes; Penn & Teller: Fool Us
- Height: 6 ft 2 in (188 cm)
- Awards: 2 × World Magic Awards for Best Escape Artist, International Magic Awards for Best Escape Artist, 1st Silver Handcuff Award, Ripley's Ultimate Escape Artist
- Website: www.michaelgriffinescapes.com

Michael Griffin (born April 10, 1961) is an American escape artist, magician and illusionist. He is the only performer to have won Best Escape Artist at both the World Magic Awards and the International Magic Awards, making him the only two-time winner across both organizations. He is also known for his $100,000 worldwide challenge to anyone who can keep him prisoner, and for performing a stunt where he is hanged by the neck.

== Early life ==
Griffin was born in Lexington, Kentucky. He began practicing escape techniques as a child, initially tying himself up with rope and attempting to escape. His father, a psychiatrist, later supported his son's pursuit of escapology as a career.

== Television appearances ==
Griffin has accumulated over 17 segments across the series Masters of Illusion and appeared in multiple episodes of Extreme Escapes, which originally aired on Reelz and is available on Amazon Prime Video. The 18-episode series features escape artists performing challenges developed in collaboration with the performers. He has been featured on Penn & Teller: Fool Us and has been proclaimed "Ultimate Escape Artist" by Ripley's Believe It or Not!.

In 2012, Griffin was selected to appear on America's Got Talent. Originally scheduled to perform his Navy Sea Bag escape, producers suggested Griffin have Howard Stern come on stage and tie Michael up with rope. Stern told Griffin on air that he "really liked" him. Griffin made his escape but was not selected to continue.

Griffin appeared on the national television program P.M. Magazine in March 1981 and subsequently performed 13 weeks of shows for children on a local Dallas television station.

== Live show ==
Griffin performs a 90-minute concert-format live show at performing arts centers, theaters, colleges, casinos, and private events worldwide. The show features multiple original escape acts including handcuff escapes performed inside a United States Navy canvas body bag, the Posey straitjacket escape, and a worldwide $100,000 open challenge in which audience members provide their own restraints each night, meaning no two performances are identical.

The show includes the East Indian Needle Mystery, a self-taught act developed over thirteen years in which Griffin swallows 40 two-inch steel sewing needles and thread and retrieves them fully threaded in sequence, verified by an audience volunteer. The act has a documented history of fatalities among practitioners who attempted it without mastering the required technique.

The show closes with the Compression Chamber, an original invention acquired from a private collector and developed as a performance escape with no existing precedent. The device is an airtight steel drum into which Griffin is shackled and locked from the outside, placed in a black isolation room on stage.

== Stunts ==
=== Early career escapes ===
Griffin's first documented public escape occurred on July 17, 1980, when he performed at the Oklahoma County Sheriff's Department in Oklahoma City, where he was restrained by Sheriff Gene Wells using official handcuffs, leg irons, and restraints. The escape was certified in a signed document by Sheriff Wells and witnessed by members of the press and television crew from KOCO TV.

On July 9, 1981, Griffin visited the Orange Coast Daily Pilot newspaper in Costa Mesa, California, for an interview and demonstration. He was placed in five sets of handcuffs, one set of Turkish elbow locks, a belly chain, and ankle cuffs — one set of handcuffs applied by Detective Paul Cappuccilli of the Costa Mesa Police Department. Griffin was placed in a room with a single entrance and emerged five minutes later completely free of all restraints, which were found to be thoroughly interlocked. He was searched beforehand in hair, mouth, between the toes, and on the bottom of the feet, with no hidden key or device found. The escape was witnessed by Detective Cappuccilli, reporter Jeff Parker, and other staff members and authenticated in a signed statement by staff writer Michael Dougan.

Griffin's first underwater stunt occurred in Newport Beach, California in August 1982. In front of assembled media and onlookers, he was chained up with 15 feet of iron chain secured with four padlocks. He jumped from the bow of one of two yachts supplied by the Magic Island private club and escaped to a depth of 20 feet in 30 seconds.

=== Posey straitjacket ===
Griffin is documented as the first performer to escape from the Posey straitjacket, a heavy-duty medical restraint device. The escape was witnessed and certified during a live television broadcast on the Dannysday program on November 12, 1980. Producer Steven J. Engel certified in a signed statement that Griffin was tied with ropes around both hands and ankles, then bound to a metal folding chair, with the ropes tied by the host, co-host, and a stage hand who made a genuine effort to secure the knots. Griffin escaped within five minutes in full view of the studio and television audience.

=== Police department escapes ===
During a show for the prisoners at the Sedgwick County Jail in Wichita, Kansas, Griffin was restrained in 14 pairs of handcuffs and 6 leg irons then secured into an isolation cell. The escape was accomplished in 8 minutes and a sworn certificate signed by the Sheriff attesting to the facts of the escape was given to Griffin.

On May 4, 1983, Griffin performed an escape at the Tecumseh Police Department, where he was stripped and thoroughly searched for hidden keys or lockpicks, then restrained with a 50-pound chain, 2 sets of leg irons, and 10 pairs of the latest police handcuffs. He was placed in a separate room from his clothing. He escaped from all restraints, dressed himself, and met officers at the front of the station — all within 4 minutes. The escape was verified in a signed letter of certification by Police Chief Richard Holland.

On June 2, 1983, Griffin performed at the Deer Park, Texas Police Department, where he was thoroughly searched after being stripped of all clothing, then escaped from regulation handcuffs and two new styles of straitjackets recently put into operation by the department. The escape was witnessed and certified by Sergeant S.W. Davis.

=== Under-ice escape ===
During a concert appearance in Cincinnati, Ohio, Griffin performed what his management described as an escape Houdini had never accomplished — escaping from police restraints while submerged beneath ice in a river. A hole was cut into the ice off the dock of the Mike Fink restaurant on the Covington, Kentucky side of the Ohio River. Griffin was locked in three pairs of police handcuffs and one set of leg irons before disappearing beneath the ice, appearing free approximately 30 seconds later. The escape was witnessed by paramedics, a Covington police officer, and members of the press.

=== Coffin escape ===
During a three-day appearance at the Sandusky County Fair in Fremont, Ohio, Griffin was challenged by the Nopper-Veh Funeral Home to escape from a metal coffin designed with an airtight seal. He succeeded in escaping in under 11 minutes.

=== Times Square rope escape ===
As part of a Ripley's Believe It or Not! segment, Griffin was bound with 100 feet of rope in Times Square, New York City, by Gregg Valentino, then recognized as having the world's largest arms. Tightly bound from neck to feet in a series of knots, Griffin twisted free in seconds in full public view.

=== Fastest rope escape — Pat McAfee ESPN appearance ===
Griffin performed what was described as the fastest rope escape in the world on The Pat McAfee Show on ESPN during the Pat McAfee Draft Spectacular. Following the escape, McAfee and his co-hosts declared on air: "This guy is Harry f***ing Houdini."

=== Houdini's underwater packing box ===
He was the first magician to be given use of Houdini's underwater packing box, which had been in dry storage for 90 years. Griffin was allowed to examine it and decide whether to accept the challenge; the escape was successful.

=== Public hanging ===
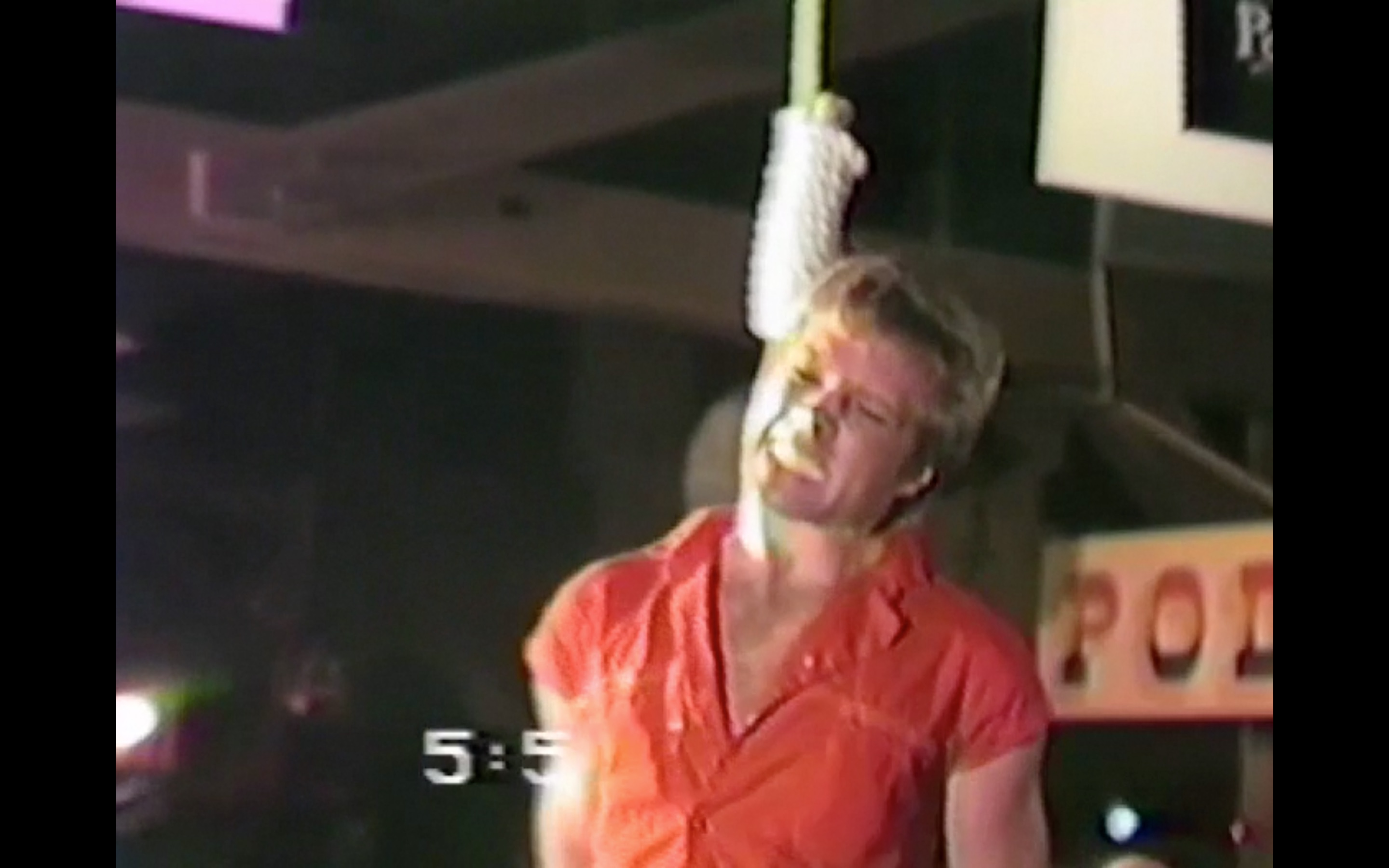
Griffin during the hanging escape

In January 1984, Griffin recreated a stunt he had originally performed in Houston, Texas on September 29, 1983. A regulation 13-knot noose was used and applied by Johnny Darr, Sheriff of Sedgwick County, Kansas. Griffin's hands were tied behind his back, and he was pulled from the back of a horse. He made his escape in 37 seconds. According to Griffin, "The pain was unbearable, I thought I was dying." Griffin later wrote a first-person account of the experience for the Globe, describing the physical ordeal of escaping a hangman's noose with his hands tied behind his back while suspended from a horse.

=== Escape challenge ===
Griffin issued a challenge to reward $10,000 to anyone who could keep him prisoner. He later increased the amount to $100,000. The challenge remained uncollected as of 2026.

== Awards and nominations ==
- 1993 Best Escape Artist, World Magic Awards (Award)
- 1999 Best Escape Artist, World Magic Awards (Award)
- Best Escape Artist, International Magic Awards (Award)
- 2004 Silver Handcuffs, World Escape Artist Convention (Award)
- Ripley's Believe It or Not — Ultimate Escape Artist
