= Squeeze box (magic trick) =

The Squeeze Box is an illusion designed and originally performed by André Kole.

== Effect ==
A person gets in a horizontal box, and sticks their head out of one end, their feet out of the other. The box is squeezed - sometimes by spinning a wheel - pushing both ends towards the middle until the person's head is right next to their feet. Both head and feet move throughout, and at the end the box is stretched back out and the person emerges unscathed.

== Notable performances ==
- André Kole
- David Copperfield
- Siegfried and Roy
