= David Copperfield's flying illusion =

Levitation illusion

David Copperfield has performed a levitation illusion in several magic shows since 1992 in which he appears to fly on stage for several minutes, while surrounded by audience members. The flight is notable for its graceful motion and unencumbered appearance. The illusion was included in Copperfield's CBS TV special The Magic of David Copperfield XIV: Flying—Live The Dream (1992), and has been repeated several times during Copperfield's live tours around the world. The method was created by John Gaughan. An essential contribution to make fluid movements was given by his assistant, dancer and choreographer Joanie Spina.

== Effect ==
During the trick, Copperfield flies acrobatically on the stage, performs a backflip in midair, and then has spinning hoops passed around him, supposedly to prove that he is not suspended by wires. He then floats down into an acrylic glass box which has previously been examined by two audience members, and continues to float inside after the box is covered. An assistant walks over the top of the box, and Copperfield walks upside down moving his feet under the assistant's feet. He then selects a female volunteer from his audience and flies with her in a fashion similar to Superman carrying Lois Lane. The illusion sometimes ends with a falcon named Icarus grasping Copperfield by the wrist and flying off stage with him.

A blue backcloth is used in the background, and the television version uses fake clouds hanging from the ceiling, taking advantage of a larger stage than is used in theatrical appearances. The performance is accompanied by an orchestration called "East of Eden Suite" by film composer Lee Holdridge, originally written as the theme music for a 1981 miniseries based on the novel East of Eden.

Before performing, Copperfield often declares that it took him seven years to develop the performance, and shows a video describing for how long men had dreamed of flying, and how many people before him had tried unsuccessfully.

Copperfield performed a much-shortened version of the illusion as the entrance in his sixteenth television special, The Magic of David Copperfield XV: Fires Of Passion, in 1993. The performance used a different background and music, in addition to burning spinning hoops.

== Method ==
John Gaughan described how the trick works in US Patent #5,354,238. According to the patent, the performer is supported by two fan-shaped arrays of fine wires that remain invisible to the viewing audience. The wires are about 0.25 millimetres (0.010 in) thick, and support about 10 kilograms (22 lb) each; the arrays contain more than enough wires to support the performer's weight. The wire arrays are mounted at the hips, near the human center of mass, to a harness worn under the clothing. This creates a balance point facilitating a wide range of movements while suspended. The wires are attached to a complex computer-controlled rig above the stage that maintains the tension in each wire, and keeps each array of wires perpendicular to the audience's line of sight so that the wires never overlap one another, which might allow the audience to see them.

Schematic showing moving hoops

During the later phases of the performance, two hoops are used simultaneously, which aids the deception as the hoops do not come into contact with the wires. Instead, each ring is brought flush to the wires before being twisted under Copperfield, so that no part of the rings actually pass across (above) the waist. In the glass box demonstration, the top of the box is threaded between the two sets of wires in a vertical position, before being rotated 90 degrees and lowered into place. The wires remain in place while the performer is in the glass box, passing through crevices between the lid and the sides. Since the box limits movement and he is only able to rotate on one axis, he stays side-on to the front of the audience while in the box. When flying with a volunteer, he holds her in front of him, and she does not come into contact with the wires.
