= Project Magic =

Project Magic is a program, designed by David Copperfield, where teams of magicians and occupational therapists work together to teach sleight of hand to people with disabilities to aid in their rehabilitation and help the patients build self-esteem. The tricks taught in Project Magic were designed to help improve dexterity, coordination, visual perception, spatial relationships, and cognitive skills, with specific magic tricks developed for varying disabilities.

== Origin ==
When David Copperfield received a press clipping in a letter from a magician he had been corresponding with, he was surprised to learn from the photograph that the young man was in a wheelchair. "His self-image did not have a disability," said Copperfield. This led Copperfield to wonder if magic could help to recover patients and gain self-confidence.

In February 1982, Copperfield brought his idea to the Daniel Freeman Memorial Hospital in Inglewood, California, which was recognized by the National Association of Rehabilitation Facilities as the "outstanding rehabilitation center of 1981". Copperfield began collaborating with Julie DeJean, the hospital's director of occupational therapy, to develop tricks that could be applied to treat various disabilities. The participants also gained self-confidence by being able to do things that others could not.

== Structure ==
Teams of magicians and occupational therapists work together to teach sleight of hand to people with disabilities to aid in their rehabilitation. The occupational therapists using Project Magic work in teams with local volunteer magicians. The magician first teaches the illusions to the therapists, then together, they instruct the patients on how to perform the illusions. The therapist then helps the patients to master the techniques involved during the following week. After a week, the magicians return and give on how to polish up the trick by using other techniques such as misdirection and the proper stage presence.

The tricks taught in Project Magic were designed to help improve dexterity, coordination, visual perception, spatial relationships, and cognitive skills. There are specific magic tricks developed for varying disabilities. It also helps build self-esteem.
