= Portal (magic trick) =

Magic trick performed by David Copperfield

"Portal" is a magic trick performed by the illusionist David Copperfield, in which he takes a member of the audience and transports both of them to a pre-selected location (Hawaii, the Hoover Dam, Australia, etc.), before reappearing on stage. This effect was featured in David Copperfield's shows from 2000 to the summer of 2007, and then again from the winter of 2007 to the spring of 2008. Additionally, it was featured in the 2001 CBS television special Copperfield: Tornado of Fire.

== Effect ==
The effect of the illusion is a disappearance of the magician and an audience member, and their reappearance in the pre-selected location via video feed. Various parts of the illusion are designed to take place throughout the whole show, with the climax as the final part of the performance.

Throughout the show, various audience members are called up on stage to collect various items that Copperfield will supposedly take with him on the "journey". This includes a picture of the magician and other audience members, the initial of an audience member on Copperfield's arm, and other proofs that show the video is not pre-recorded.

In the final segment of the show, Copperfield reads the letter of an audience member wishing to be transported to their perfect place. Copperfield then calls the audience member on to the stage to join him.

A picture of the magician with the audience member is taken, and then showed by the two men on video after the disappearance. After the reunion of the audience member with a loved relative, Copperfield appears back in the audience on the other side of the stage. Subsequently, mist and rain pours down on the audience members as Copperfield returns to the stage to take his final bow.
