= Escapology =

Practice of escaping from restraints

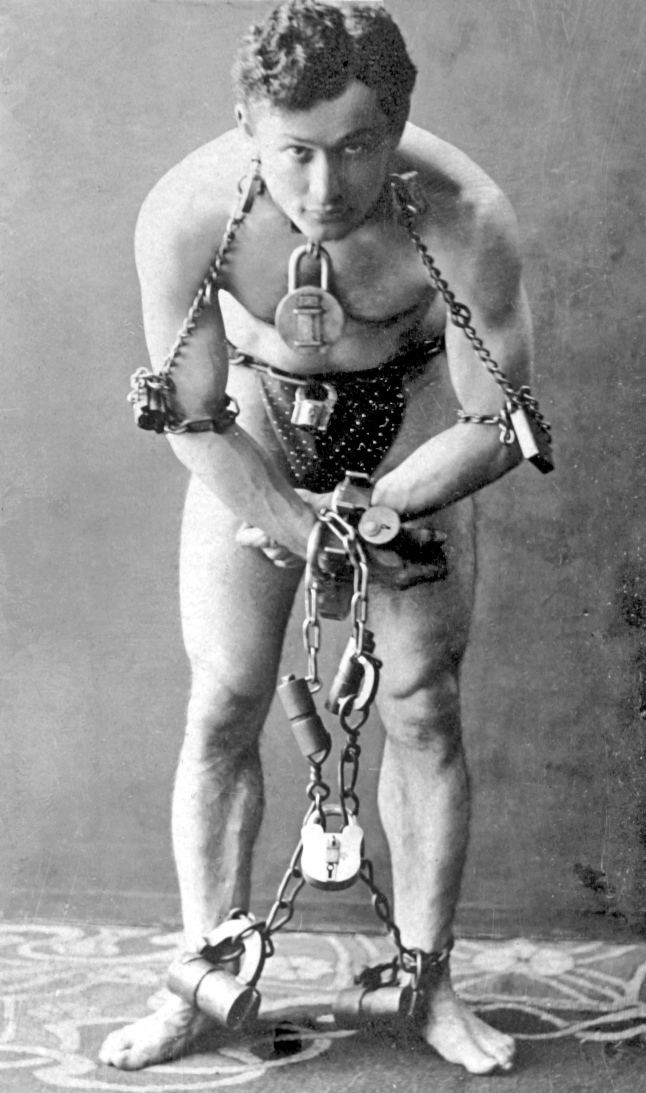
Harry Houdini (1874–1926), a famous escapologist and magician

Escapology is the practice of escaping from restraints or other traps. Escapologists (also called escape artists) escape from handcuffs, straitjackets, cages, coffins, steel boxes, barrels, bags, burning buildings, fish-tanks, and other perils, often in combination.

== History ==
The art of escaping from restraints and confined spaces has been a skill employed by performers for a very long time. It was not originally displayed as an overt act in itself but was instead used secretly to create illusions such as a disappearance or transmutation. In the 1860s, the Davenport Brothers, who were skilled at releasing themselves from rope ties, used the art to convey the impression they were restrained while they created spirit phenomena.

Other illusionists, including John Nevil Maskelyne, worked out how the Davenports did their act and re-created the tricks to debunk the brothers' claims of psychic power. However, the re-creations did not involve overt escape, merely a replication of tricks with the statement that they were accomplished by secret magicians' skills rather than spirits. It took another thirty years before the pure skill of escape began to be displayed as an act in itself.

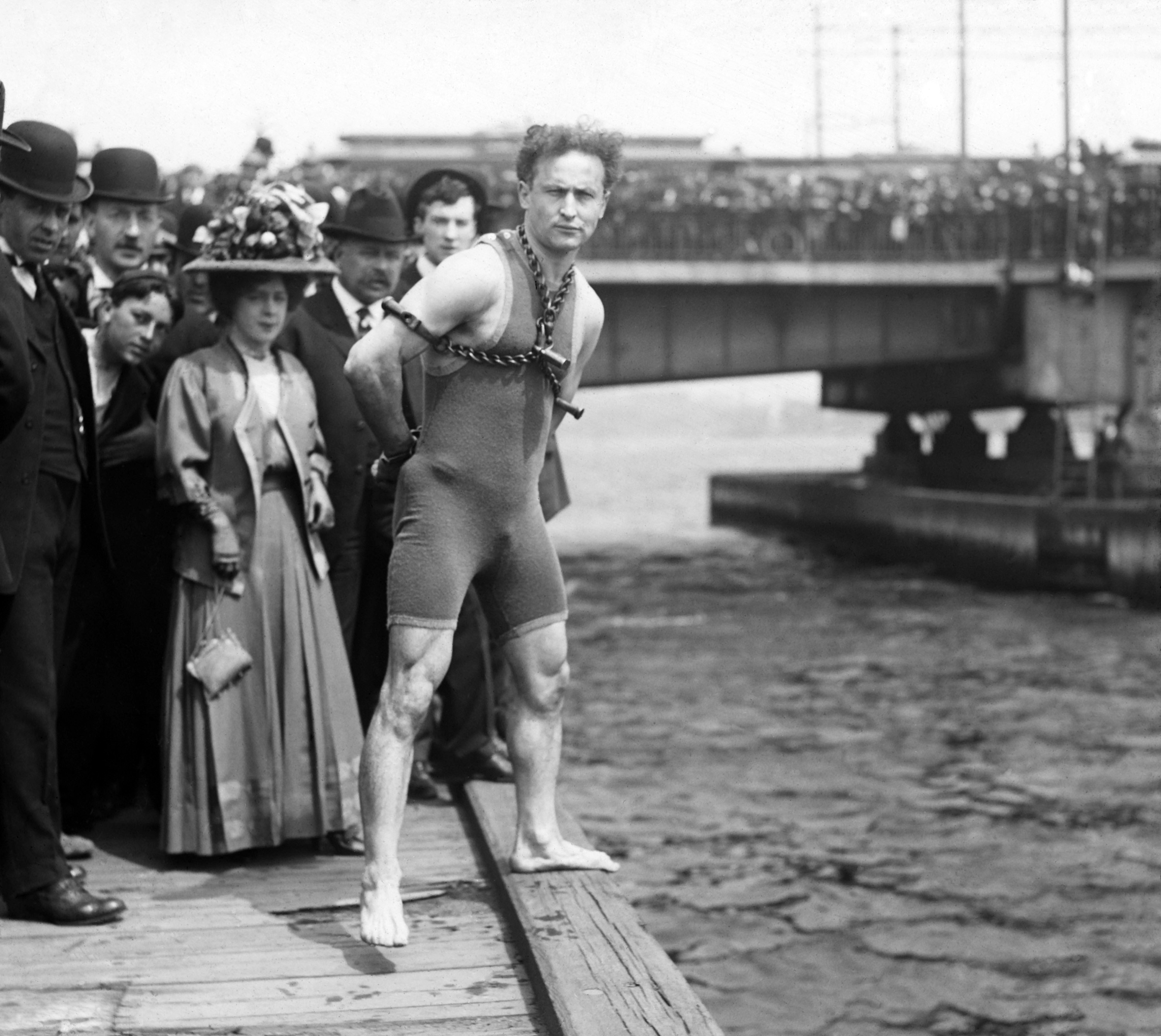
Harry Houdini before one of his escapology performances in Boston 1908

The figure most responsible for making escapology a recognized entertainment was Harry Houdini, who built his career on demonstrating the ability to escape from a huge variety of restraints and difficult situations. Houdini made no secret of the fact that he was an expert on restraints and the skills needed to overcome them but he often concealed the exact details of his escapes to maintain an air of mystery and suspense. Although many of his escapes relied on technical skills such as lock-picking and contortion, he also performed tricks such as Metamorphosis and the Chinese Water Torture Cell, which are essentially classic stage illusions reliant on cleverly designed props. Houdini's feats helped to define the basic repertoire of escapology, including escapes from handcuffs, padlocks, straitjackets, mail bags, beer barrels, and prison cells.

A succession of performers have added new ideas and created variations on old stunts, but it is common for even the best contemporary escapologists to be dubbed modern day "Houdinis". During his lifetime, Houdini argued his main escape acts were copyrighted, and sued competitors such as John Clempert, who in 1906 apologized and settled out of court.

== Predicament escape ==
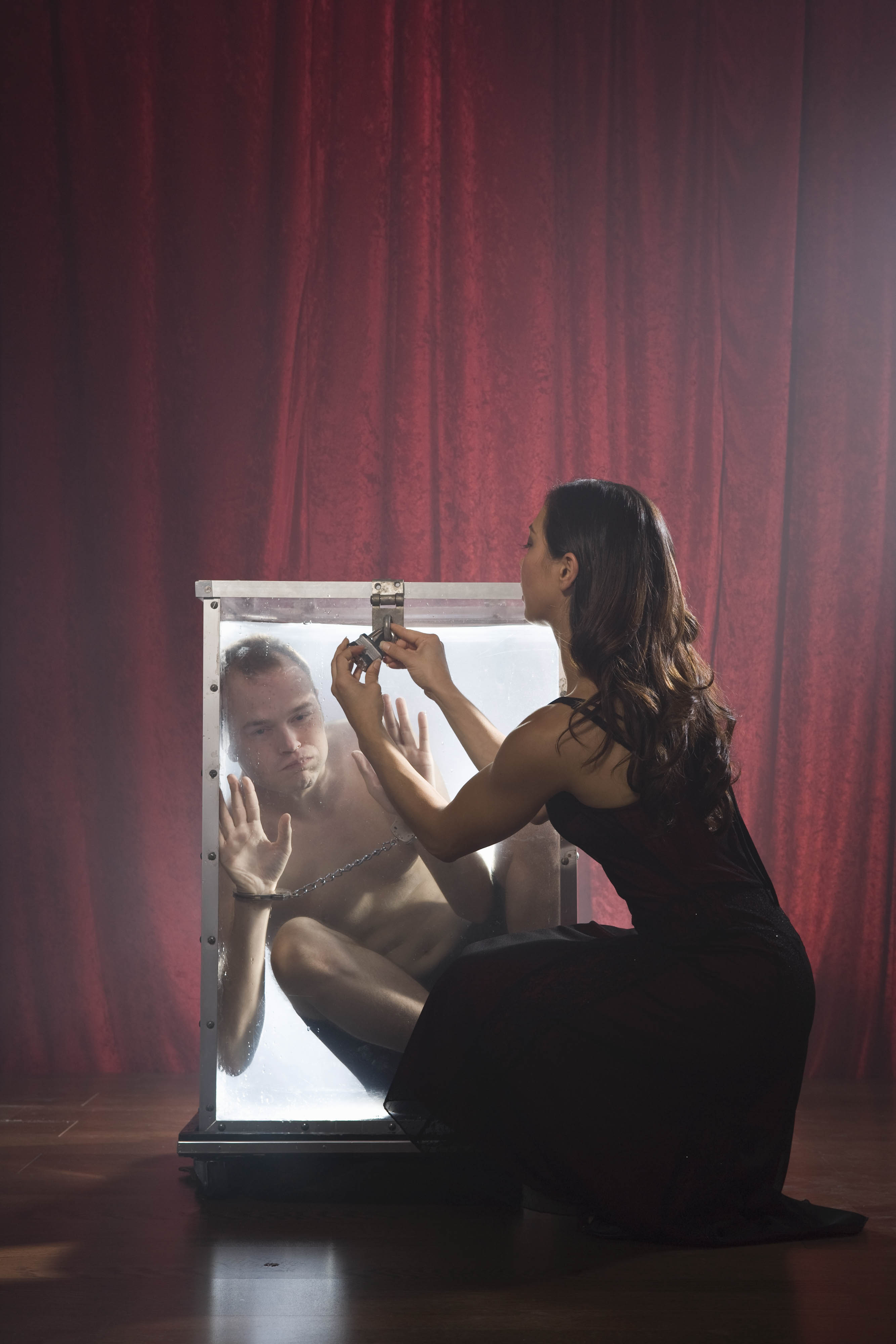
Curtis Lovell II in chains, being locked in a box filled with water by assistant

A predicament escape is any form of magic trick or escapology stunt in which the performer is trapped in an apparently dangerous situation and is required to escape from it. Classic examples include the Table of Death, Houdini's Chinese Water Torture Cell, Princess Tenko's escape from an exploding boat and the Upside Down Suspended Straitjacket escape, in which a performer is suspended high in the air from a burning rope.

Another variant makes it appear the escape has gone wrong without the performer re-appearing. Such a trick was performed by Paul Daniels on the Halloween edition of his BBC television show in 1987. He was chained up in an iron maiden type device where a set of spikes were set to close on him after a timer ran out. The broadcast showed the spikes closing on him before he had appeared and then the titles rolled. It was only revealed later that he was alright and the intended effect of the trick had been to shock viewers.

== World records ==
In 2012, Lucas Wilson, an illusionist from Canada managed the fastest ever recorded escape from a straitjacket while suspended; he escaped in 8.4 seconds while hanging upside down from his ankles at a height of 1m.

== In fiction ==
- The Grim Game, a 1919 film, stars Harry Houdini as a young man who is bound and imprisoned on numerous occasions by a gang who have kidnapped his fiancée. Considered by many as Houdini's best film. Lost for over 90 years and rediscovered in 2015 by escape artist and magician Dorothy Dietrich.
- Haldane of the Secret Service, a 1924 film directed by and starring Harry Houdini, who is repeatedly restrained by villains who murdered his detective-father. Filmed at Beaver Kill Falls in Valatie, NY.
- The novel The Amazing Adventures of Kavalier & Clay, written by Michael Chabon and winner of the 2001 Pulitzer Prize, features escapology as an important plot point.
- Ragtime, by E.L. Doctorow, features Harry Houdini as a major character, and uses escapology as a metaphor for the struggles faced by the American immigrant.
- In American superhero comic books, many superheroes like Batman are trained in escapology, which is invaluable when dealing with deathtraps. However, superheroes who are escapologists by profession include Mister Miracle, Ms. Liberty and The Escapist. (Mister Miracle and The Escapist were both based on escapologist-turned-comic artist Jim Steranko.) Houdini himself appeared as a time/space traveler in the comic book series Daring Escapes featuring Houdini.
- The 1953 biographical film, Houdini, starring Tony Curtis in the title role, depicted many of Houdini's escapology performances. Curtis' performance artist character, The Great Leslie, also performs a suspended straight-jacket escape at the start of the film The Great Race.
- In 1982, Griffin O'Neal played a junior escapologist named Danny Masters in the film, The Escape Artist.
- In 1983, real-life escape artist Bill Shirk played himself in a film called The Escapist.
- Yorick, the main character of the comic book Y: The Last Man, is an escape artist.
- In the 1991 film, The Linguini Incident, Rosanna Arquette plays an aspiring escape artist.
- The novels Specific Gravity and Ontario Lacus by J. Matthew Neal (2007 and 2008) features a scientist who is also a master escape artist.
- Houdini himself - or rather his ghost - appeared in an episode of The Real Ghostbusters; not having lost his touch, the protagonists' ghost traps could not hold him for more than a minute.
- The console video game Exit focuses around the exploits of the self-proclaimed escapologist known as Mr. ESC.
- The 2006 movie The Prestige deals with two magicians who employ increasingly difficult escape illusions in a competitive one-upmanship, with tragic results.
- In the 2013 film, Now You See Me, Isla Fisher plays an escape artist named Henley Reeves. In an interview, she says, "I watched all of Houdini’s work and Dorothy Dietrich, who is a female escapologist, who is amazing, you have to watch her." “I got to train with Dorothy Dietrich, the first lady magician to catch a bullet with her teeth." Fisher studied the life and work of Dietrich to prepare for the role. "Dorothy is a real female escapologist who is working today. She was the first woman to capture a bullet between her teeth, which is an amazing feat. She's not only good at misdirection, but she also connects emotionally with the audience, so she's better able to involve them in the stunts."

== List of notable escape artists ==
- Alan Alan
- Criss Angel
- Norman Bigelow
- Antony Britton
- David Copperfield
- Cosentino
- Doc Cunningham
- Dorothy Dietrich
- Jonathan Goodwin
- Michael Griffin
- Dean Gunnarson
- Harry Houdini
- Kristen Johnson
- David Merlini
- Gopinath Muthukad
- James Randi
- Frank Reno
- Bill Shirk
- Johnny Strange
- Roslyn Walker
- Major Zamora

== See also ==
- Illusionist
- List of magicians
- Stunt performer
