= David Copperfield (illusionist) =

American magician (born 1956)

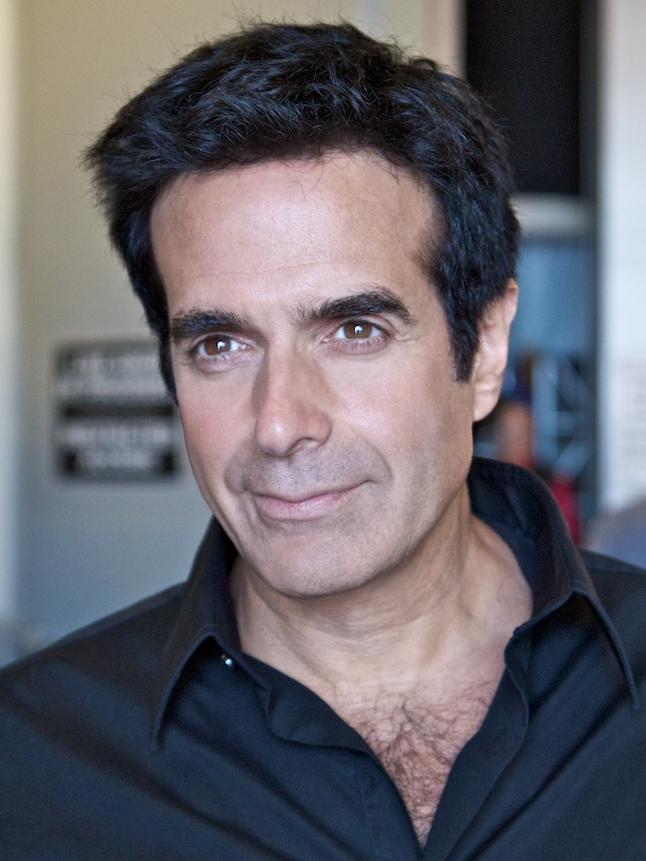
- Copperfield in 2010
- Born: David Seth Kotkin; September 16, 1956 (age 70); Metuchen, New Jersey, U.S.
- Occupation: Stage magician
- Years active: 1972–present
- Partners: Claudia Schiffer (1994–1999); Chloé Gosselin (2006–present)
- Children: 3
- Website: davidcopperfield.com

David Seth Kotkin (born September 16, 1956), known professionally as David Copperfield, is an American stage magician and illusionist described by Forbes as the most commercially successful magician in history.

Copperfield's television specials have been nominated for 38 Emmy Awards, winning 21. Known for his combination of storytelling and illusion, his performance, in a career spanning more than 40 years, has earned 11 Guinness World Records, a star on the Hollywood Walk of Fame and a knighthood by the French government. He has been named a Living Legend by the US Library of Congress.

His illusions have included the disappearance of a Learjet aircraft (1981), the vanishing and reappearance of the Statue of Liberty (1983), levitating over the Grand Canyon (1984), walking through the Great Wall of China (1986), escaping from Alcatraz prison (1987), being locked in a safe and attempting to escape from Hotel Charlotte before it imploded (1989), the disappearance of an Orient Express train dining car (1991) and flying on stage for several minutes (1992).

As of 2006, he had sold 33 million tickets and grossed over US$4 billion, more than any other solo entertainer in history by a large margin. In 2015, Forbes listed his earnings at $63 million for the previous 12 months and ranked him the 20th highest-earning celebrity in the world.

Copperfield has faced multiple allegations of sexual misconduct, including a 2007 federal investigation that was closed without charges and a 2018 accusation regarding an incident in 1988. In early 2024, unsealed documents identified him as an associate of Jeffrey Epstein and revealed photographs of him with Ghislaine Maxwell, though his lawyers denied he was a close friend. Subsequently, a May 2024 investigation by The Guardian detailed allegations from 16 women accusing Copperfield of sexual misconduct and inappropriate behavior spanning from the late 1980s to 2014, all of which his legal team has denied.

== Early life and education ==
Copperfield was born David Seth Kotkin in Metuchen, New Jersey, the son of Jewish parents Rebecca Kotkin (née Gispan; 1924–2008), an insurance adjuster, and Hyman Kotkin (1922–2006), who owned and operated Korby's, a men's haberdashery in Warren, New Jersey. His mother was born in Jerusalem in Mandatory Palestine while his paternal grandparents were Jewish emigrants from the Ukrainian SSR. In 1974 he graduated from Metuchen High School.

Copperfield started his career as a ventriloquist at age eight with his own Jerry Mahoney puppet. When he was 10, he began practicing magic as "Davino the Boy Magician" in his neighborhood, and at 12, he became the youngest person admitted to the Society of American Magicians. A shy loner, the young Copperfield saw magic as a way to fit in and, later, to meet women. As a child, he attended Camp Harmony, a day camp in nearby Warren, New Jersey, where he began practicing magic and ventriloquism, an experience he credits with the origins of his creative style. As he described it, "At Camp Harmony, we spent two weeks searching for a guide who'd been kidnapped by Indians. It was just a game, but I was living it. My whole life goes back to that camp experience when I was three or four." As a teenager, he became fascinated with Broadway and frequently sneaked into shows, especially musicals by Stephen Sondheim or Bob Fosse. By age 16, he was teaching a course in magic at New York University.

== Career ==
=== Early career ===
At 18, Copperfield enrolled at New York City's Jesuit-based Fordham University, but, three weeks into his freshman year, he left to play the lead role in the musical The Magic Man in Chicago. At that time, he adopted the stage name David Copperfield, taken from the Charles Dickens novel, because he liked its sound. He sang, danced, and created most of the original illusions in the show. The Magic Man became the longest-running musical in Chicago history.

At age 19, he created and headlined for several months the first "Magic of David Copperfield" show at the Pagoda Hotel in Honolulu, Hawaii, with the help of sound and lighting designer Willy Martin.

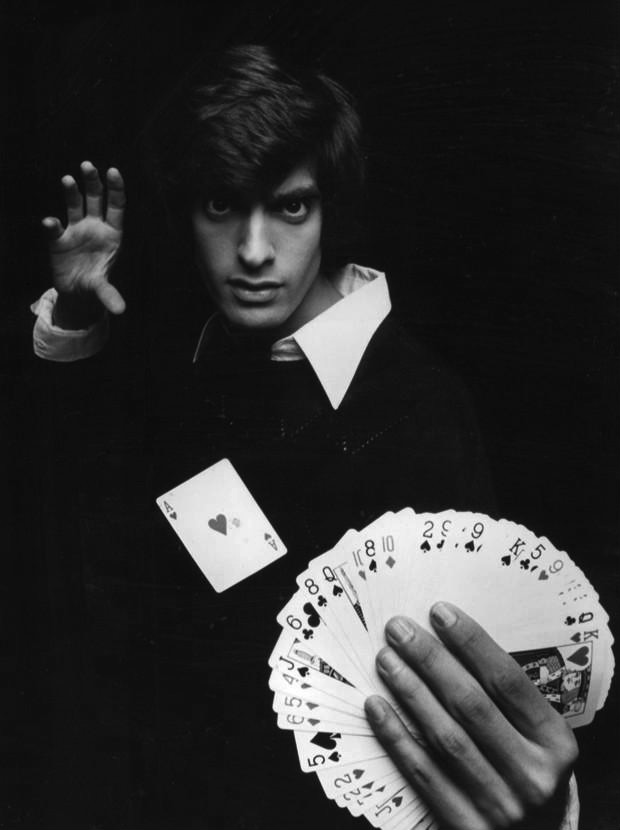
Performing for the 1977 ABC special

Copperfield's career in television began in earnest when he was discovered by Joseph Cates, a producer of Broadway shows and television specials. Cates produced a magic special in 1977 for ABC called The Magic of ABC, hosted by Copperfield, as well as several The Magic of David Copperfield specials on CBS between 1978 and 2001. There have been 18 Copperfield TV specials and 2 documentaries between September 7, 1977, and April 3, 2001.

=== 1980s ===
Copperfield also played the character The Magician in the 1980 horror film Terror Train and had an uncredited appearance in the 1994 film Prêt-à-Porter. Most of his media appearances have been through television specials and guest spots on television programs.

One of his most famous illusions occurred on television on April 8, 1983: A live audience of 20 tourists was seated in front of a giant curtain attached to two lateral scaffoldings built on Liberty Island in an enclosed viewing area. Copperfield, with help from Jim Steinmeyer and Don Wayne, raised the curtain before lowering it again a few seconds later to reveal that the space where the Statue of Liberty once stood was empty. A helicopter hovered overhead to give an aerial view of the illusion and the statue appeared to have vanished, with only the circle of lights surrounding it still present and visible. Before making the statue reappear, Copperfield explained in front of the camera why he wanted to perform this illusion. He wanted people to imagine what it would be like if there were no liberty or freedom in the world today and what the world would be like without the freedoms and rights we enjoy. Copperfield then brought the statue back, ending the illusion by saying that "our ancestors couldn't enjoy rights and freedoms, we can and our children will". Both the disappearance and the reappearance of the statue were filmed in long take to demonstrate the absence of camera tricks. This illusion was featured in season four of The Americans, in an episode entitled "The Magic of David Copperfield V: The Statue of Liberty Disappears", and in the 2019 HBO documentary Liberty: Mother of Exiles.

In 1986, Copperfield debuted a new variation on the classic sawing a woman in half illusion. Copperfield's Death Saw illusion was presented as an escape gone wrong, sawing himself, rather than an assistant, in half with a large rotary saw blade which descended from above. Copperfield's Death Saw has become one of his most well-known illusions.

=== 1990s ===
In 1996, in collaboration with Francis Ford Coppola, David Ives, and Eiko Ishioka, Copperfield's Broadway show Dreams & Nightmares broke box office records in New York at the Martin Beck Theatre. Reviewer Greg Evans described the sold-out show in Variety magazine: "With a likable, self-effacing demeanor that rarely comes across in his TV specials, Copperfield leads the audience through nearly two hours of truly mind-boggling illusions. He disappears and reappears, gets cut in half, makes audience members vanish and others levitate. Copperfield climaxes his show with a flying routine, seven years in the making, that defies both logic and visual evidence, he could probably retire just by selling his secrets to future productions of Peter Pan".

Also in 1996, Copperfield joined forces with Dean Koontz, Joyce Carol Oates, Ray Bradbury and others for David Copperfield's Tales of the Impossible, an anthology of original fiction set in the world of magic and illusion. A second volume, David Copperfield's Beyond Imagination, was published in 1997. In addition to the two books, Copperfield wrote an essay as part of NPR's "This I Believe" series and This I Believe, Inc.

=== 2000s ===
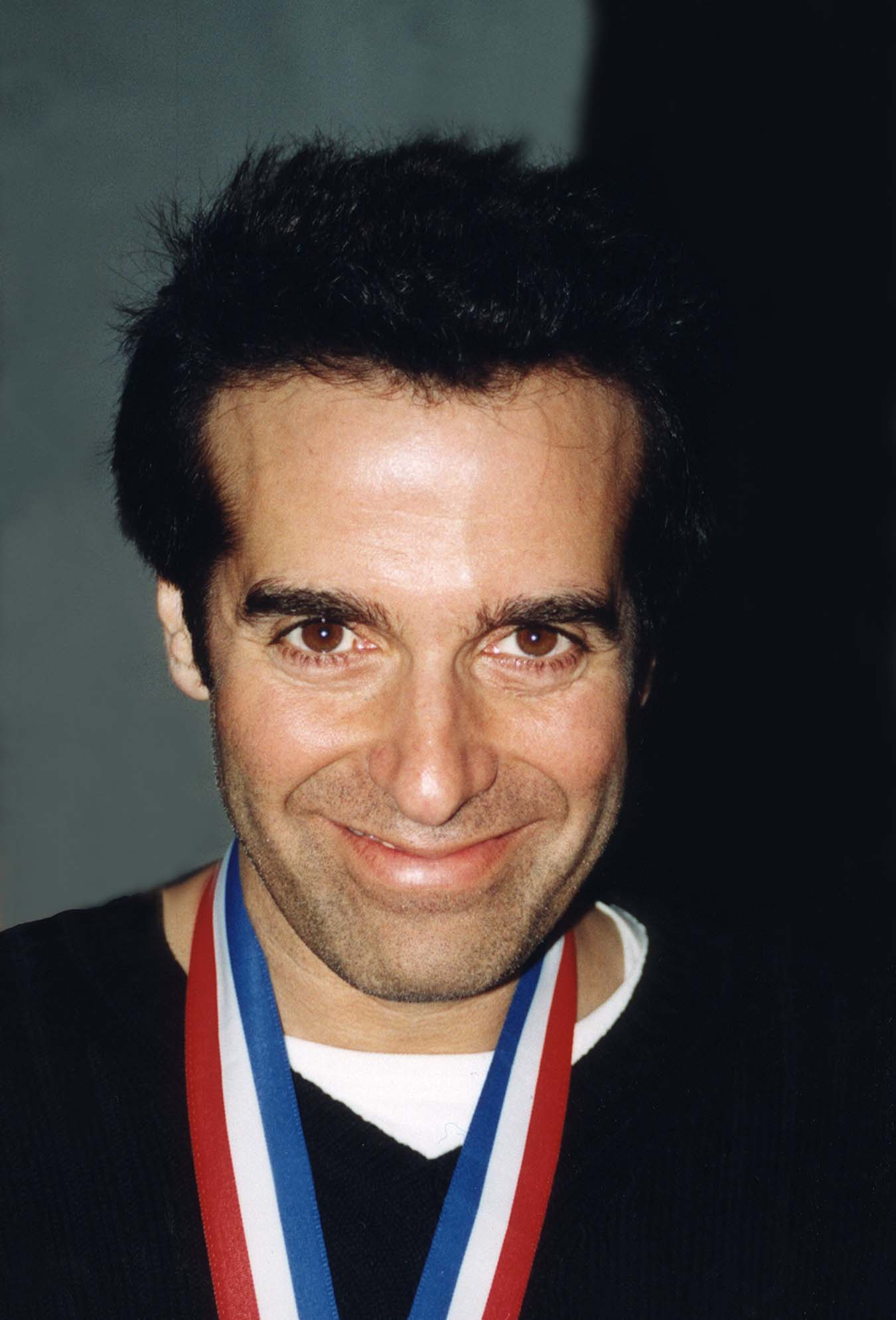
Copperfield in 2000

In May 2001, Copperfield entertained guests at a White House benefit for UNICEF by performing a new illusion in which he sawed singer and actress Jennifer Lopez into six pieces while standing up. This illusion was an update of one he performed in one of his early TV specials on actress Catherine Bach, and has never been performed publicly in any of his stage or TV appearances.

In 2002, he was the subject of an hour-long biographical special on A&E's "Biography" channel.

On April 5, 2009, Copperfield made his first live TV appearance for some time when he entertained the audience at the 44th Annual Academy of Country Music Awards with two illusions. First, he made singer Taylor Swift appear inside an apparently empty translucent-sided elevator as it was lowered from the ceiling; he then sawed her in half in his Clearly Impossible illusion.

On May 7, 2009, Copperfield was dropped by Michael Jackson from Jackson's residency at the O2 Arena after a disagreement over money. Copperfield wanted $1 million (£666,000) per show. Copperfield denied the reports of a falling-out, saying "don't believe everything you read." News of Copperfield's collaboration with Jackson first surfaced on April 1, 2009, and has since been described as a possible April Fool's prank.

In July 2009, he filmed a number of scenes for a cameo appearance in episode 8 of the short-lived TV drama The Beautiful Life. In these scenes, he worked alongside actresses Mischa Barton and Sara Paxton performing a number of illusions including a sawing in half of Barton's character Sonja Stone in a specially-developed box-less version of the illusion. Due to the show's cancellation after just two episodes had been aired, episode 8 was never completed and the footage of Copperfield's performances remains unseen.

In August 2009, Copperfield took his show to Australia.

=== 2010s ===
In January 2011 Copperfield joined the cast of the feature film Burt Wonderstone with Steve Carell, Jim Carrey, James Gandolfini and Olivia Wilde. Copperfield and his team developed illusions used in the film. Copperfield has served as technical advisor on several other films, including The Prestige and Now You See Me. He also served as a co-producer of the film Now You See Me 2.

In July 2012, OWN-TV network aired a one-hour special and interview with Copperfield as part of the network's Oprah's Next Chapter series. The show featured many aspects of Copperfield's personal life and family—with tours of his island home and Las Vegas conjuring museum—and a sampling of his illusions and magic effects. During the interview, he and his girlfriend Chloé Gosselin, a French fashion model, announced their engagement and appeared together briefly with their young daughter, strolling down the beach on the island.

In 2018, the New York Historical Society hosted “Summer of Magic: Treasures from the David Copperfield Collection.” The exhibit recounted the history of magic in New York and displayed some of Copperfield's most popular illusions, like the Death Saw, and historical magical ephemera, including some of Copperfield's collection of Houdini memorabilia.

Copperfield made the missing star from the original Star-Spangled Banner flag reappear in an illusion on Flag Day 2019, in partnership with Smithsonian's National Museum of American History. The missing star, which is believed to have been removed in the nineteenth century, reappeared inside a box that seemed to levitate.

Copperfield notes that his role models were not magicians, that "My idols were Gene Kelly and Fred Astaire and Orson Welles and Walt Disney ... they took their individual art forms and they moved people with them... I wanted to do the same thing with magic. I wanted to take magic and make it romantic and make it sexy and make it funny and make it goofy ... all the different things that a songwriter gets to express or a filmmaker gets to express". This approach, despite its obvious popularity with audiences, has its share of detractors within the profession. One magician has described Copperfield's stage presentations as "resembling entertainment the way Velveeta resembles cheese".

== Business interests ==
=== International Museum and Library of the Conjuring Arts ===
Copperfield owns the International Museum and Library of the Conjuring Arts, which houses the world's largest collection of historically significant magic memorabilia, books and artifacts. Begun in 1991 when Copperfield purchased the Mulholland Library of Conjuring and the Allied Arts, which contained the world's largest collection of Houdini memorabilia, the museum comprises approximately 80,000 items, including Houdini's Water Torture Cabinet and Metamorphosis Trunk, Orson Welles' Buzz Saw illusion, and automata created by Robert-Houdin. Copperfield's 1991 Mulholland purchase, which formed the core of his collection, engendered criticism from some magicians. One told a reporter, "David Copperfield buying the Mulholland Library is like an Elvis impersonator winding up with Graceland." In 1992, Copperfield agreed to purchase the largest private magic collection in the world from Dr. Robert Albo to add to the museum. It houses the world's largest collection of "Houdiniana" (the second largest being Houdini Museum of New York).

The museum is not open to the public; tours are reserved for "colleagues, fellow magicians, and serious collectors". Located in a warehouse at Copperfield's headquarters in Las Vegas, the museum is entered via a secret door in what is described by Forbes as a "mail-order lingerie warehouse". "It doesn't need to be secret, it needs to be respected", Copperfield said. "If a scholar or journalist needs a piece of magic history, it's there."

=== Musha Cay and the Islands of Copperfield Bay ===
In 2006, Copperfield bought eleven Bahamian islands called Musha Cay. Renamed "The Islands of Copperfield Bay", the islands are a private resort. Guests have reportedly included Oprah Winfrey and John Travolta. Google co-founder Sergey Brin was married there. Copperfield has said that the islands may contain the Fountain of Youth, a claim that resulted in him receiving a Dubious Achievement Award from Esquire magazine in 2006.

=== "Magic Underground" restaurant ===
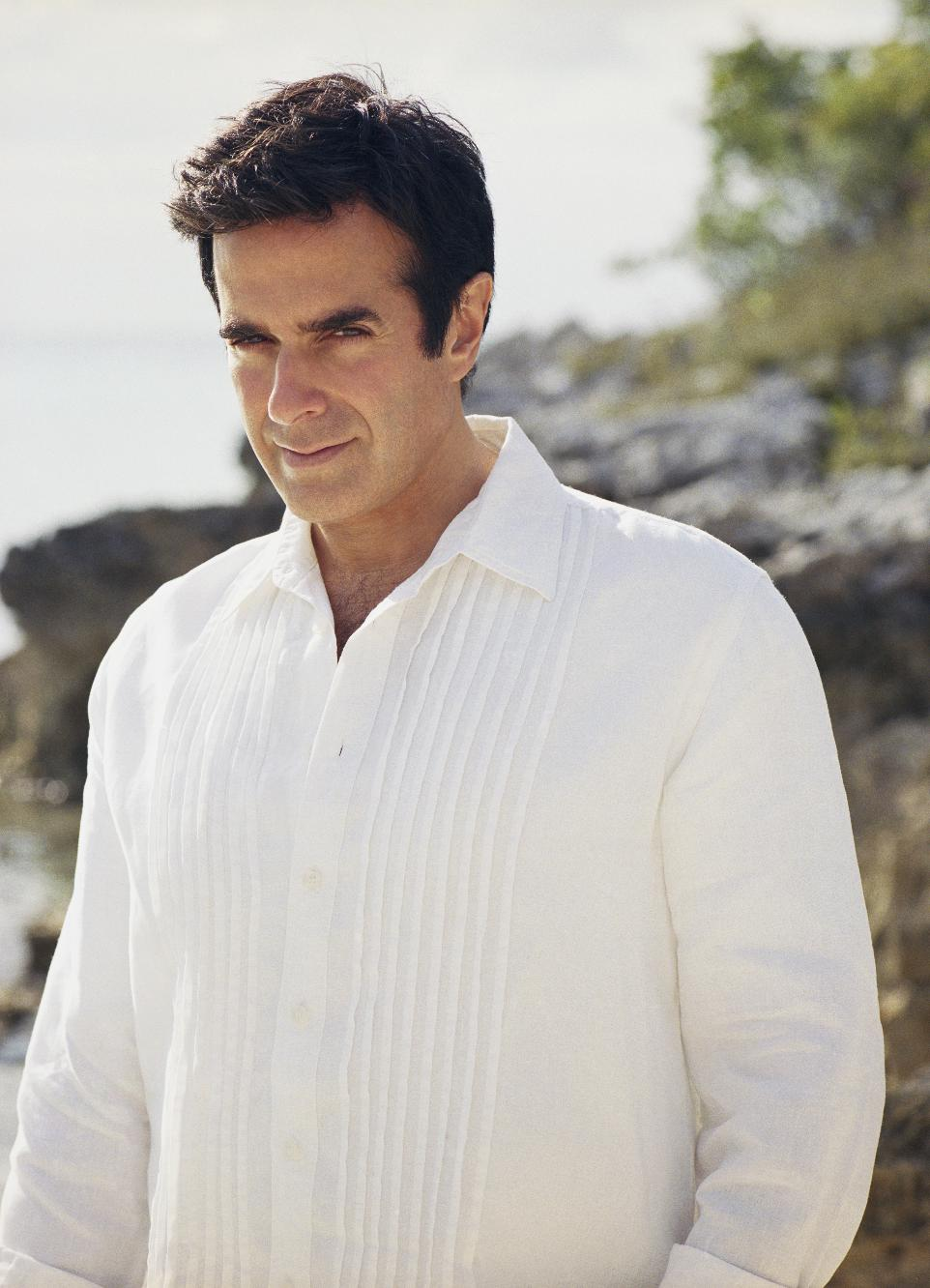
Copperfield in March 2014 on Musha Cay and the Islands of Copperfield Bay

David Copperfield's Magic Underground was planned to be a restaurant based on Copperfield's magic. At Walt Disney World in Orlando, Florida, a sign on Hollywood Boulevard during the late 1990s indicated the restaurant was coming soon. Signs also appeared around Pleasure Island and outside Disney-MGM Studios. A Magic Underground restaurant was also to open in New York's Times Square. Plans included eventual expansion into Disneyland in Anaheim, California, as well as Paris and Tokyo. The restaurants were to have magic props and other items on the walls; magicians would go around to tables doing sleight of hand tricks. There was also to be a larger stage for larger stunts. The restaurant in Times Square was 85% completed, but amid disputes between the creative team and the financial team and enormous cost overruns, finances dried up from the investors, the project was canceled, and Disney canceled the lease. Copperfield was not an investor in the project; the investors reportedly lost $34 million, and subcontractors placed $15 million in liens.

=== Recorded message for expanded gambling in Maryland ===
In October 2012, Maryland residents received a robocall from Copperfield supporting a ballot initiative that would expand gambling in the state.

=== Copperfield's Secrets on the Moon ===
Copperfield's magic secrets and related technological innovations are etched into nickel plates, designed to last billions of years, as part of the Arch Mission Foundation "lunar library" that crashed into the moon in April 2019 during an attempted landing of the lunar module Beresheet. It is believed the payload survived.

=== Accidents and injuries ===
On March 11, 1984, while rehearsing an illusion called "Escape From Death" where he was shackled and handcuffed in a tank of water, Copperfield became tangled in the chains and started taking in water and banging into the sides of the tank. He was pulled from the water after 80 seconds, hyperventilating and in shock, taken to a Burbank hospital, and found to have pulled tendons in arms and legs. He was in a wheelchair for a week and used a cane for a period thereafter.

While doing a rope trick at a show in Memphis in 1989, Copperfield accidentally cut off the tip of his finger with sharp scissors. He was rushed to the hospital and the fingertip was reattached.

On December 17, 2008, during a live performance in Las Vegas, a 26-year-old assistant named Brandon was sucked into the spinning blades of a 12 feet (3.7 m) high industrial fan that Copperfield walks through. The assistant sustained multiple fractures to his arm, severe bleeding, and facial lacerations that required stitches. Copperfield canceled the rest of the performance and offered the audience members refunds.

=== Magic as an art form ===
Since 2016, Copperfield has campaigned for Congressional Resolution 642, which would “recognize magic as a rare and valuable art form and national treasure". The campaign has been unsuccessful as of November 2022.

=== Las Vegas residency ===
As of September 2024, Copperfield performs daily, with 15 shows scheduled each week, at the David Copperfield theater in the MGM Grand Las Vegas. Each show is 90 minutes in duration.

Copperfield performed his last show at the MGM Grand in Las Vegas on April 30, 2026.

== Litigation ==
On July 11, 1994, Copperfield sued magician and author Herbert L. Becker in order to prevent publication of Becker's book which reveals how magicians perform their illusions. Becker won the lawsuit but, because of a secrecy agreement Becker signed with Copperfield and an independent finding that Becker's description of Copperfield's methods was inaccurate, the publisher removed the section on Copperfield from the book before publication. In 1997, Becker sued Copperfield and Lifetime Books for $50 million for breach of contract between himself and Lifetime Books, the publisher of his book All the Secrets of Magic Revealed. Copperfield settled at the last moment and the publisher lost during the court trial.

In 1997, Copperfield and Claudia Schiffer sued Paris Match for $30 million after the magazine claimed their relationship was a sham, that Schiffer was paid for pretending to be Copperfield's fiancée and that she did not even like him. In 1999, they won an undisclosed sum and a retraction from Paris Match. Copperfield's publicist confirmed that Schiffer had a contract to appear in the audience at Copperfield's show in Berlin where they met, but was not under contract to be his "consort".

On August 25, 2000, Copperfield unsuccessfully sued Fireman's Fund Insurance Company for reimbursement of a $506,343 ransom paid to individuals in Russia who had commandeered the entertainer's equipment there.

In 2004, John Melk, co-founder of Blockbuster Inc., and previous owner of Musha Cay, sued Copperfield for fraud after Copperfield purchased the island chain, alleging that Copperfield had deliberately obscured his identity during the purchase and that he would not have sold the island to Copperfield. Copperfield claimed that Melk had agreed to sell the property to Copperfield's Imagine Nation Company, and that Copperfield negotiated the deal through a third party because he feared Melk was "seeking to exploit" Copperfield's celebrity status by demanding an unfair price. The terms of the settlement are undisclosed.

On November 6, 2007, Viva Art International Ltd and Maz Concerts Inc. sued Copperfield for nearly $2.2 million for breach of contract and the Indonesian promoter of Copperfield's canceled shows in Jakarta held on to $550,000 worth of Copperfield's equipment in lieu of money paid to Copperfield that had not been returned. Copperfield countersued, and the dispute was resolved in July 2009.

In 2018, a lawsuit alleging that a British tourist and audience member Gavin Cox was injured during a November 2013 performance, was resolved in Copperfield's favor. He was found "not liable".

In August 2024, David Copperfield was sued by the board of the Galleria condominium in Manhattan, New York, for $2.5 million connected to the negligence and damage of his unit that threatens the building's structural integrity.

=== Sexual assault allegations ===
Copperfield was accused of sexual assault in 2007 by Lacey L. Carroll. A federal grand jury in Seattle closed the investigation in January 2010 without bringing charges. In January 2010, the Bellevue City Prosecutor's Office brought misdemeanor charges against Carroll for prostitution and allegedly lying to police in another case. Carroll filed a civil lawsuit against Copperfield, which was dropped in April 2010. In January 2018, Copperfield was accused of drugging and assaulting a teenager in 1988. Copperfield published a statement in response on January 24, 2018.

In January 2024, Copperfield's name was listed as one of the associates of American financier and sex offender Jeffrey Epstein. In May 2024, it was revealed that Copperfield met with Epstein at least three times, and that Copperfield called and left messages for Epstein 16 times between 2004 and 2005, though lawyers for Copperfield insist that Copperfield "was not a friend of Jeffrey Epstein" and that he "never" called Epstein personally. Johanna Sjoberg, a woman who later accused Epstein of abusing her, claimed that she met Copperfield at a dinner at Epstein's Palm Beach residence in 2004 during which Copperfield asked her if she "was aware that girls were getting paid to find other girls," though lawyers for Copperfield claim that the question was merely posed out of "concern" for Sjoberg. Sjoberg testified that "it was her observation the two were friends". In December 2025, the Justice Department released photos of Copperfield and Ghislaine Maxwell, both in white bathrobes, embracing each other.

In May 2024, The Guardian published an investigation in which 16 women accused Copperfield of engaging in sexual misconduct and inappropriate behavior, with the alleged incidents spanning a time range from the late 1980s to 2014. The allegations include claims that Copperfield drugged three women before having sexual relations with them, and more than half of the allegations were from women who were under 18 at the time of the alleged incidents. In response, lawyers for Copperfield called the allegations "false and entirely without foundation".

On August 31, 2026, Copperfield was one of fourteen people named by Representative Thomas Massie in a speech on the floor of the House of Representatives, in which Massie said they had aided Epstein in his crimes and called for them to be investigated and prosecuted, while advocating a follow-on to the Epstein Files Transparency Act. PBS News Hour noted that inclusion in the released Epstein files does not in itself indicate wrongdoing.

== Personal life ==
In 1993 at a Berlin celebrity gala Copperfield met German supermodel Claudia Schiffer when he brought her on stage to participate in a mind-reading act and his flying illusion, and in January 1994 they became engaged. During the engagement, Schiffer sometimes appeared on stage with Copperfield to act as his special guest assistant in illusions including being sawn in half. She also appeared alongside Copperfield in David Copperfield: 15 Years of Magic (1994), a documentary in which she played the role of a reporter interviewing him, and at the end of which they reprised their performance of the "Flying" illusion. After a nearly six-year engagement, in September 1999 they announced their separation, citing work schedules.

In 1997, Copperfield purchased a 16,000-square-foot (1,500 m^{2}), quadruplex penthouse in New York City, originally built for Stewart R. Mott, for $7.4 million. In 2015, a valve failed in the pump room that had machinery for the lap pool in the penthouse, and water flooded his penthouse apartment as well as multiple floors of the New York City apartment building on East 57th Street. According to a lawsuit against him, “Copperfield abandoned the unit in or about 2018,” laying off a housekeeper, a house manager and a handyman.

In April 2006, he and two female assistants were robbed at gunpoint after a performance in West Palm Beach, Florida. His assistants handed over their money, passports, and a cell phone. According to his police statement, Copperfield did not hand over anything, claiming that he used sleight of hand to hide his possessions, although later admitting that doing so was "a reflex that could have got me shot." One of the assistants wrote down most of the license plate number, and the suspects were later arrested, charged, and sentenced.

Copperfield's girlfriend Chloé Gosselin, a French fashion model 28 years his junior, gave birth to his daughter in 2010. Copperfield has two other children, a son and a daughter.

In July 2016, Copperfield purchased the residence at 1625 Enclave Court in Las Vegas's Summerlin community for $17.55 million.

== Earnings ==
David Copperfield on the Forbes Celebrity 100 List
Year (June–June)	Pay (USD, millions)	Power rank	Pay rank
1999–2000	not on list		
2001	60	23	5
2002	not on list		
2003	55	43	10
2004	57	35	10
2005	57	41	10
2006–2008	not on list		
2009	30	80	50

Forbes magazine reported that Copperfield earned $55 million in 2003, making him the 10th highest paid celebrity in the world (earnings figures are pre-tax and before deductions for agents' and attorneys' fees, etc.). He earned $57 million in 2004 and 2005, and $30 million in 2009 in entertainment earnings, according to Forbes. Copperfield performs over 500 shows per year throughout the world.

== Charitable activities ==
In March 1982, Copperfield founded Project Magic, a rehabilitation program to help disabled patients regain lost or damaged dexterity skills by using sleight of hand as physical therapy. The program has been accredited by the American Occupational Therapy Association, and is in use in over 1,100 hospitals in 30 countries. Copperfield made an appearance on Oprah Radio in April 2008 to talk with host Dr. Mehmet Oz about how magic can help disabled people.

In 2007, he organized and performed at a charity show for UNICEF in Los Angeles, along with a number of celebrity guests. During the show, he used his ex-Orson Welles Buzz Saw illusion to saw British TV presenter Cat Deeley in half.

Copperfield organized relief efforts after Hurricane Dorian hit the Bahamas in 2019, using his own plane to fly in supplies.

== Achievements and awards ==
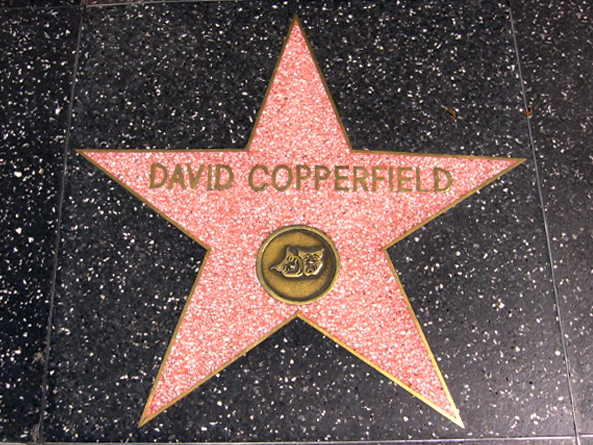
Copperfield's star on the Hollywood Walk of Fame

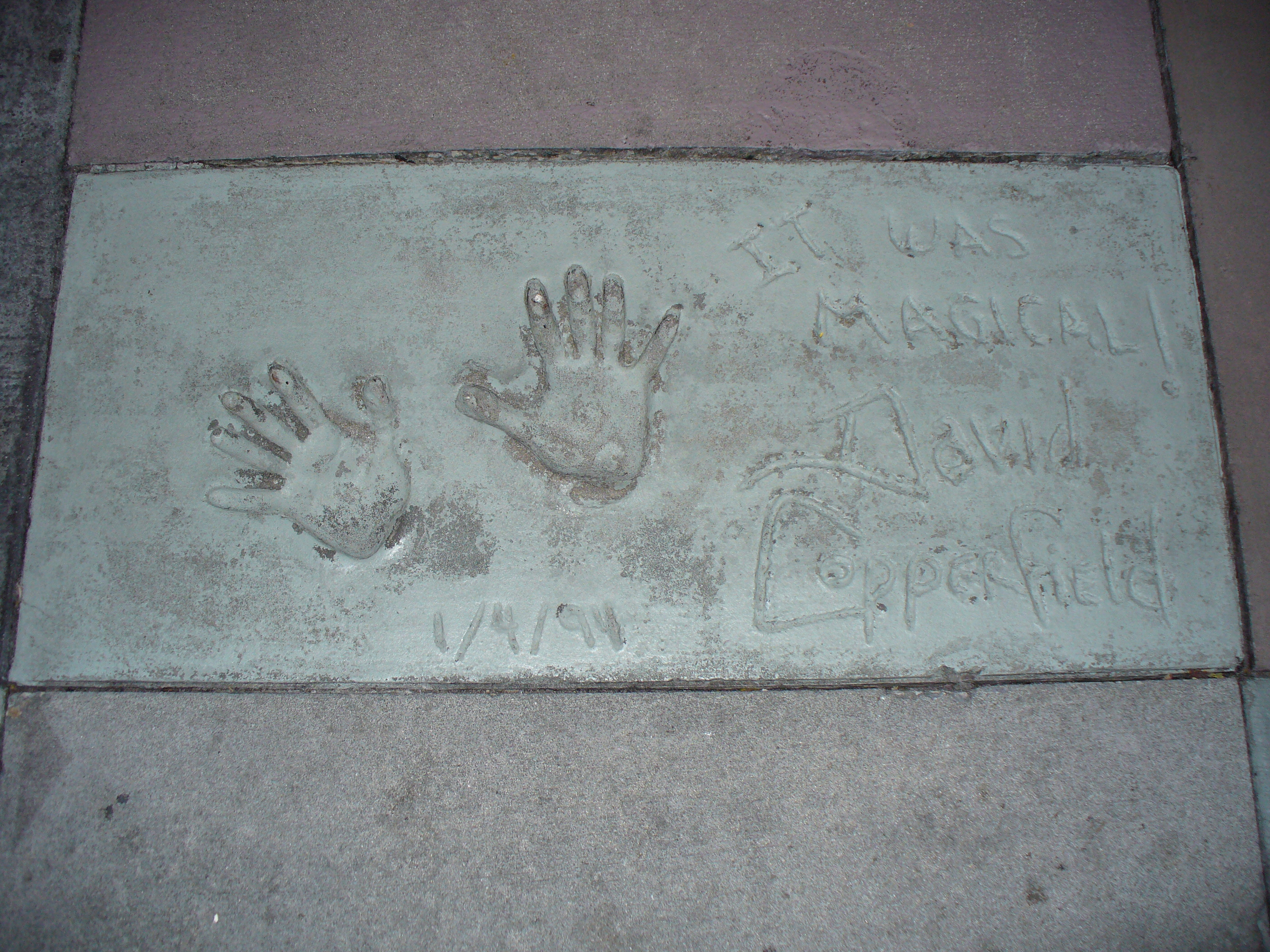
The hand prints of Copperfield in front of The Great Movie Ride at Walt Disney World's Disney's Hollywood Studios theme park

- The Society of American Magicians named him "Magician of the Century" and the "King of Magic".
- Copperfield has been nominated 38 times for Emmy Awards, with 21 wins.
- Copperfield received a Living Legend Award from the Library of Congress.
- Copperfield is the first living magician to receive a star on the Hollywood Walk of Fame.
- Copperfield received the Chevalier of Arts and Letters, the first one ever awarded to a magician.
- Copperfield was named "Magician of the Year" in 1979 and 1986 by the Academy of Magical Arts.
- Forbes's "The Celebrity 100" for 2009 ranks Copperfield as the 80th most powerful celebrity, with earnings of $30 million.
- Copperfield was inducted into New York City's Ride of Fame on September 11, 2015.
- In December 2020, Copperfield became the 23rd member of the Hall of Fame of the National Museum of American Jewish History, joining Ruth Bader Ginsburg and Steven Spielberg. Copperfield inducted Harry Houdini as the 22nd member during the same ceremony.

=== Guinness World Records ===
Copperfield holds 11 Guinness World Records, including:

- Most magic shows performed in a year
- Most tickets sold worldwide by a solo entertainer
- Highest career earnings as a magician
- Largest international television audience for a magician
- Highest annual earnings for a magician (current year)
- Largest Broadway attendance in a week
- Largest magic work archive
- Most expensive poster depicting magic sold at auction
- Largest illusion ever staged

== Television specials ==
1. The Magic of ABC (September 7, 1977) (with special guests Fred Berry, Shaun Cassidy, Howard Cosell, Kate Jackson, Hal Linden, Penny Marshall, Kristy McNichol, Donny Osmond, Marie Osmond, Parker Stevenson, Dick Van Patten, Adam Rich, Abe Vigoda and Cindy Williams)
2. The Magic of David Copperfield (October 27, 1978) (with special guests Orson Welles, Carl Ballantine, Valerie Bertinelli, Sherman Hemsley, Bernadette Peters and Cindy Williams)
  - One Emmy nomination: Outstanding Achievement in Technical Direction and Electronic Camerawork
3. The Magic of David Copperfield II (October 24, 1979) (with special guest Bill Bixby, Loni Anderson, Valerie Bertinelli, Robert Stack and Alan Alan)
  - One Emmy nomination: Outstanding Achievement in Technical Direction and Electronic Camerawork
4. The Magic of David Copperfield III: Levitating Ferrari (September 25, 1980) (with special guest Jack Klugman, Debby Boone, Mary Crosby, Louis Nye, Shimada, Cindy Williams and David Mendenhall).
  - Two Emmy nominations: Outstanding Achievement in Music Direction; Outstanding Achievement in Technical Direction and Electronic Camerawork
5. The Magic of David Copperfield IV: The Vanishing Airplane (October 26, 1981) (with special guest Jason Robards, Susan Anton, Audrey Landers, Catherine Bach, David Mendenhall, Barnard Hughes, Clark Brandon and Elaine Joyce) The last illusion, Lear Jet Vanish, was filmed in long take at the Van Nuys Airport in Los Angeles, California.
  - One Emmy win: Outstanding Technical Direction and Electronic Camerawork
6. The Magic of David Copperfield V: The Statue of Liberty Disappears (April 8, 1983) (with special guests Morgan Fairchild, Michele Lee, Eugene Levy, William B. Williams and Lynne Griffin)
7. The Magic of David Copperfield VI: Floating Over the Grand Canyon (April 6, 1984) (with special guests Ricardo Montalbán, Bonnie Tyler and Heather Thomas). The extended international version featured an additional 10 minutes of performance, including Tyler being sawed in half by Copperfield.
  - One Emmy win: Outstanding Technical Direction/Camerawork/Video for a Limited Series or a Special
  - Two Emmy nominations: Outstanding Achievement in Music Direction; Outstanding Live and Tape Sound Mixing and Sound Effects for a Limited Series or a Special
8. The Magic of David Copperfield VII: Familiares (March 8, 1985) (with special guests Angie Dickinson, Teri Copley, Omri Katz and Peggy Fleming)
  - One Emmy win: Outstanding Technical Direction/Electronic Camera/Video Control for a Limited Series or a Special
9. The Magic of David Copperfield VIII: Walking Through the Great Wall of China (March 14, 1986) (with special guest Ben Vereen) – This is the only special filmed outside the United States. At the end, Copperfield announced that the following year's special will take place in Egypt, though the planned location was eventually changed because of the political situation in Egypt.
  - Two Emmy nominations: Outstanding Art Direction for a Variety or Music Program; Outstanding Technical Direction/Electronic Camera/Video Control for a Miniseries or a Special
10. The Magic of David Copperfield IX: The Escape From Alcatraz (March 13, 1987) (with special guest Ann Jillian) – the television show used the soundtrack of Back to the Future, unedited and in its entirety, something for which the show was later lampooned.
  - Two Emmy nominations: Outstanding Art Direction for a Variety or Music Program; Outstanding Lighting Direction (Electronic) for a Miniseries or a Special
11. The Magic of David Copperfield X: The Bermuda Triangle (March 12, 1988) (with special guest Lisa Hartman) Filmed at the Caesars Palace in Las Vegas
  - Two Emmy nominations: Outstanding Art Direction for a Variety or Music Program; Outstanding Technical Direction/Electronic Camera/Video Control for a Miniseries or a Special
12. The Magic of David Copperfield XI: Explosive Encounter (March 3, 1989) (with special guest Emma Samms) Filmed at the Orange County Performing Arts Center in Orange County, California.
  - Two Emmy wins: Outstanding Costume Design for a Variety or Music Program; Outstanding Lighting Direction (Electronic) for a Drama Series, Variety Series, Miniseries or a Special
  - Two Emmy nominations: Outstanding Art Direction for a Variety or Music Program; Outstanding Sound Mixing for a Variety or Music Series or a Special
13. The Magic of David Copperfield XII: The Niagara Falls Challenge (March 30, 1990) (with special guest Kim Alexis and Penn & Teller) Filmed at the Orange County Performing Arts Center in Orange County, California.
  - One Emmy win: Outstanding Technical Direction/Camera/Video for a Miniseries or a Special
14. The Magic of David Copperfield XIII: Mystery On The Orient Express (April 9, 1991) (with special guest Jane Seymour) Filmed in part at the Tampa Bay Performing Arts Center in Tampa Bay, Florida and the Tillamook Air Museum in Tillamook, Oregon.
  - Four Emmy wins: Outstanding Achievement in Special Visual Effects; Outstanding Art Direction for a Variety or Music Program; Outstanding Lighting Direction (Electronic) for a Drama Series, Variety Series, Miniseries or a Special; Outstanding Technical Direction/Camera/Video for a Miniseries or a Special
  - One Emmy nomination: Outstanding Editing for a Miniseries or a Special – Multi-Camera Production
15. The Magic of David Copperfield XIV: Flying – Live The Dream (March 31, 1992) (with special guest James Earl Jones and a special appearance by the late Orson Welles) Filmed at the Broward Center for the Performing Arts in Ft. Lauderdale, Florida.
  - Three Emmy wins: Outstanding Individual Achievement in Art Direction for a Variety or Music Program; Outstanding Individual Achievement in Editing for a Miniseries or a Special – Multi-Camera Production; Outstanding Individual Achievement in Lighting Direction (Electronic) for a Drama Series, Variety Series, Miniseries or a Special
16. The Magic of David Copperfield XV: Fires Of Passion (March 30, 1993) (with special guest Wayne Gretzky) Filmed in part at Caesars Palace in Las Vegas and the Tampa Bay Performing Arts Center in Tampa Bay, Florida.
  - Three Emmy wins: Outstanding Individual Achievement in Art Direction for a Variety or Music Program; Outstanding Individual Achievement in Editing for a Miniseries or a Special – Multi-Camera Production; Outstanding Individual Achievement in Technical Direction/Camera/Video for a Miniseries or a Special
17. David Copperfield: 15 Years of Magic (May 12, 1994) (with special guest Claudia Schiffer as "The Reporter", and appearances of various guests from previous specials via archive footage, such as James Earl Jones and Joanie Spina). In the international version, in addition to reprising their "Flying" illusion, Copperfield and Schiffer also reprised the performance of the Clearly Impossible illusion from Copperfield's stage shows in which Schiffer was sawed in half inside a transparent box. A special version of the show was also produced for Italian TV, La Grande Magia Di David Copperfield. Broadcast in two parts, this replaced Schiffer with Italian TV presenter Giorgio Mastrota and his wife Natalia Estrada, who took Schiffer's place in the Clearly Impossible illusion.
  - One Emmy win: Outstanding Individual Achievement in Editing for a Miniseries or a Special – Multi-Camera Production
18. The Magic of David Copperfield XVI: Unexplained Forces (May 1, 1995) – Filmed at the Tampa Bay Performing Arts Center in Tampa Bay, Florida.
  - Three Emmy wins: Outstanding Individual Achievement in Editing for a Miniseries or a Special – Multi-Camera Production; Outstanding Individual Achievement in Lighting Direction (Electronic) for a Drama Series, Variety Program, Miniseries or a Special; Outstanding Technical Direction/Camera/Video for a Miniseries or a Special
  - Two Emmy nominations: Outstanding Individual Achievement in Art Direction for a Variety or Music Program; Outstanding Individual Achievement in Sound Mixing for a Variety or Music Series or a Special
19. David Copperfield: The Great Escapes (April 26, 2000)
20. Copperfield – Tornado of Fire (April 3, 2001) (with special guests Carson Daly and, only in the international version, Whoopi Goldberg. Carson Daly was replaced by Hans Kazàn in the Dutch version and Marco Berry in the Italian version) – Filmed in January 2001 in a surrounded stage at the Mid-South Coliseum in Memphis, Tennessee, and a live (in the U.S. only) tornado stunt performed at Pier 94 in New York City, NY. (North America version 60 minutes, European version 90 minutes)
  - One Emmy nomination: Outstanding Art Direction for a Variety or Music Program

== Worldwide tours ==
- The Magic of David Copperfield: Live on Stage (1983–1986)
- The Magic of David Copperfield: Radical New Illusions (1987–1989)
- David Copperfield: Magic for the 90's (1990–1994)
- David Copperfield: Beyond Imagination (a.k.a. The Best of David Copperfield) (1995–1996)
- David Copperfield: Dreams and Nightmares (a.k.a. The Magic is Back) (1996–1998)
- David Copperfield: Journey of a Lifetime (a.k.a. U!) (1999–2000)
- David Copperfield: Unknown Dimension (a.k.a. Global Encounter) (2000–2001)
- David Copperfield: Portal (2001–2002)
- David Copperfield: An Intimate Evening of Grand Illusion (a.k.a. World of Wonders) (2003–present)

== Plans for new illusions ==
Copperfield declared that among the new illusions he plans to create, he wants to put a woman's face on Mount Rushmore, straighten the Leaning Tower of Pisa and even vanish the moon.

== Filmography ==
- Terror Train (1980) as the Magician
- The Secret of The Phantom of the Opera (1988) as host and narrator. Docu-drama filmed at the Palais Garnier about the iconic novel and its adaptations.
- Mister Rogers' Neighborhood (1997) as himself
- Scrubs, episode "My Lucky Day" (2002) as himself
- Oh My God (2009) as himself
- America's Got Talent (2010) as himself
- The Simpsons, episode "The Great Simpsina" (2011) as himself (voice)
- Wizards of Waverly Place, episode "Harperella" (2011) as himself
- Burt Wonderstone (2013) as himself
- The Amazing Race 24 (2014)
- American Restoration (2014)
- Unity (2015) as narrator
- 7 Days in Hell (2015) as himself

== Popular illusions ==
Created and/or performed by Copperfield:

- Laser illusion
- Portal
- Walking Through the Great Wall of China
- Death Saw
- Clearly Impossible
- Flying illusion
- Squeeze box

== See also ==
- American Museum of Magic
- Congressional Resolution 642
- Joanie Spina
- List of magic museums
