= Thirteen Steps to Mentalism =

1961 book on mentalism by Tony Corinda

- Author: Tony Corinda
- Published: 1961

Thirteen Steps to Mentalism is a book on mentalism by Tony Corinda. It was originally published as thirteen smaller booklets as a course in mentalism and was later republished as a book in 1961. The book is now considered by most magicians to be a classical text on mentalism.

== Overview ==
The book describes various techniques used by mentalists to achieve what appear to be psychic phenomena such as telepathy, precognition, extra-sensory perception, telekinesis and the ability to communicate with the dead as a medium.

The book has detailed information regarding cold reading, hot reading, the construction and use of such devices as the swami gimmick, billets, and billet pens.

=== Steps ===
1. Swami gimmick
2. Pencil, lip, sound, touch and muscle reading
3. Mnemonics and mental systems
4. Predictions
5. Blindfolds and x-ray eyes
6. Billets
7. 'Book tests' and supplement
8. Two person telepathy
9. Mediumistic stunts
10. Card tricks
11. Question and answer (readings)
12. Publicity stunts
13. Patter and presentation

== Influence ==
Together with Annemann's Practical Mental Effects and T.A. Waters' Mind, Myth and Magick, it is considered standard literature for any magician, mentalist, or student of stage magic who wishes to incorporate psychic entertainment into their routine. Mentalists such as Derren Brown, Larry Becker, Lee Earle, Richard Osterlind and Banachek have relied upon Thirteen Steps To Mentalism for their own mental illusions.

In 2011 Corinda's Thirteen Steps to Mentalism was republished in the Encyclopedia of Mentalism and Mentalists.
