= Paul Brook =

British hypnotist and mentalist

Coordinates: 52°35′07.3″N 2°07′14.1″W

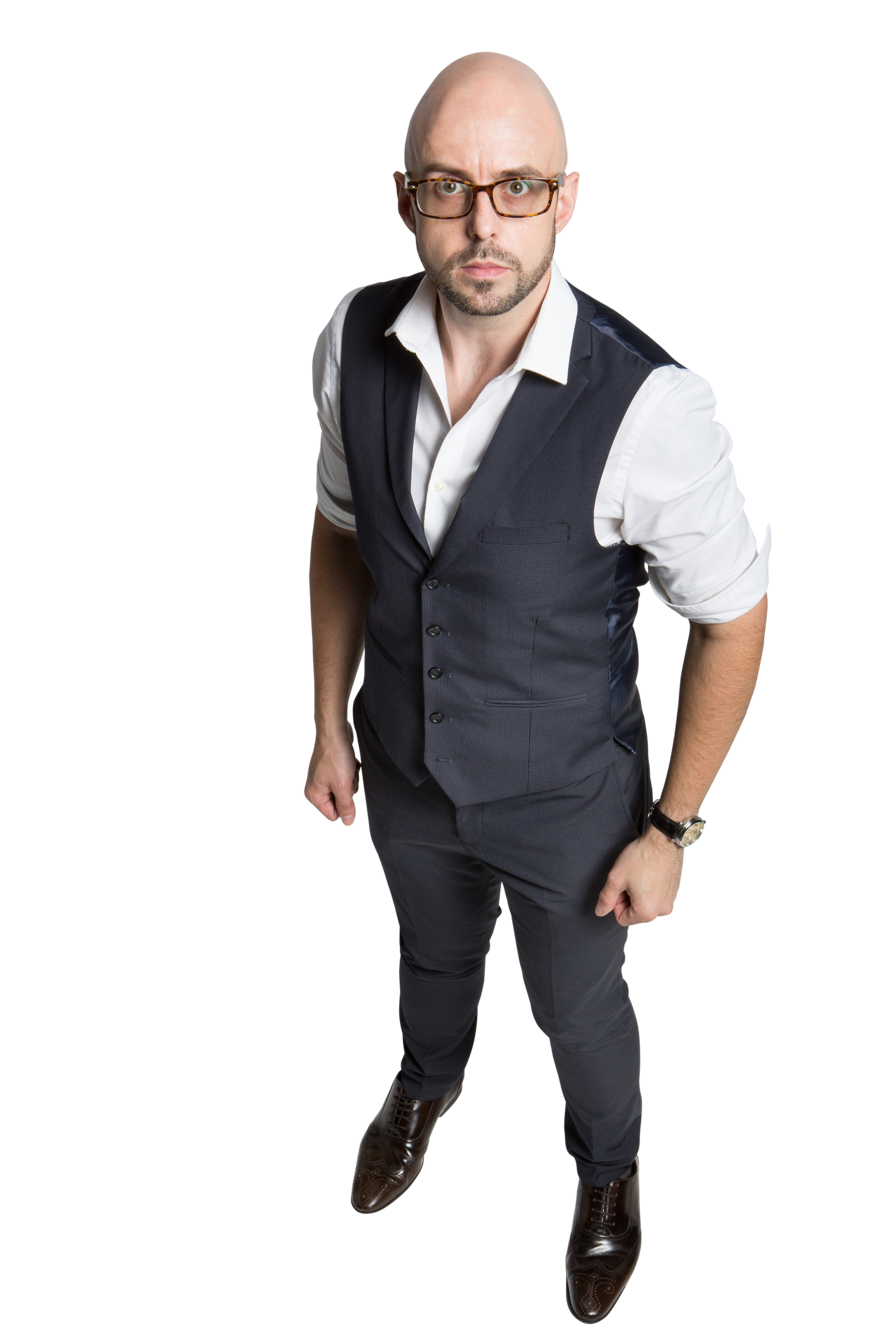
- Paul Brook
- Born: Sutton Coldfield, Birmingham
- Occupations: Entertainer, mentalist, hypnotist, presenter, writer, online streamer
- Years active: 2004–present
- Known for: Performing, Presenting, Writing
- Website: www.paulbrook.co.uk

Paul Brook is a professional British presenter, author, mentalist and online streamer. He has written over forty books on the subject of mentalism, in particular psychological mind reading. Brook is also an Atheist and a Skeptic.

== Biography ==
Brook was born and raised in Birmingham, West Midlands, he now resides in the Scottish county of Caithness near to the loch village of Watten. From a young age Brook had an interest in the subjects of the mind, especially that of hypnosis. In the early years of his career he was a psychotherapist and ran his own therapy practice in Birmingham.

In 2004 Brook decided to start entertaining full-time and became a professional psychological mind reader.

In September 2007, prominent magic magazine Genii wrote a review of his first publicised work The Brook Test, beginning his career as a technical author in the field of mentalism.

April 2007, Winner of the Magic Circle Close-Up Magician of the Year 2006, James Brown, acknowledged Paul as one of the most prominent mind readers in the UK.

October 2007, was the first public stage show of Brook's material. The show Open to Influence took place over two nights (18 and 19 October) and was described by a reviewer, "...the audience were clearly enjoying themselves. The work Paul had put into the show was evident, and the smoothness with which it ran was exemplary."

April 2008, Brook lectured alongside Marc Paul, Enrique Enríquez and David Berglas in London. The lectures were on the psychological nature of mystery entertainment. A reviewer for the lecture wrote, "Already hailed as a must read for all mentalists, Alchemical Tools has taken the mentalist community by storm."

In 2009 to 2010, MagicSeen magazine gave Brook's products four and five star reviews.

September 2012, ArtsFest Birmingham, Paul gave a public mind reading stage show at the Crescent Theatre, Birmingham as part of ArtsFest, the largest free arts festival in the UK

Throughout 2012 and 2013 Paul was an on-set Executive Consultant for a 10 episode mind reading and magic television series called 'Draíocht' starring Irish TV personality and magician Rua and created by Midas Productions. The show was first broadcast in the Spring of 2014 on the channel TG4.

April and May 2014, Brook toured the United Kingdom and Europe with the Panasonic Roadshow. During the five weeks Brook presented information about the latest technology that Panasonic has to offer and was able to perform in ways that were analogous to these technologies.

From late 2014 until mid 2017 Paul's main focus has been trade show mentalism, presenting around the world.

In April 2016, Brook gave a live streamed worldwide lecture for Penguin Magic.

July 2016, Paul was a guest lecturer at the 'MINDS 3' mentalism convention in Newcastle upon Tyne lecturing alongside Luke Jermay, Jorge Garcia, Alex McAleer, Dee Christopher, Harry Lucas and Mark Chandaue.

February 2017, saw the start of Brook's weekly 'Ask Paul Podcast', where listeners call in with entertainment, mentalism and show business questions for Paul to give his views on.

May 2017, Paul filmed an 'At The Table' lecture for Murphy's Magic Supplies.

July 2017, Brook was part of a public theatre show on the Grand Pier, Weston-super-Mare.

November 2018, Paul Brook started live streaming retro games on the Twitch streaming platform under the name 'SirGameKnight'. As of January 2019 the 'SirGameKnight' channel became Twitch Affiliated and in March 2019 has applied to become a Twitch Partner. Due to his father's long illness and subsequent death, the live streaming ended on 25 April 2019.

== Published works ==
- The Brook Test (2007)
- Good Vibrations (2007)
- The Gift: the 14th step to mentalism (2007)
- On Mephisto's Shoulder (2007)
- The Alchemical Tools (2008)
- Thought Reader Card (2008)
- You Know Who Card (2008)
- Locked In Thought (2008)
- The Chrysalis of a Polymath (2009)
- Double Blank Svengali Deck (2009)
- One In The Hand (2009)
- Two In The Bush (2009)
- Underhanded (2009)
- Juxtapose (2010)
- The Book of Lies (2010)
- This Way Up [limited edition] (2011)
- Mind Power Secrets ISBN 978-0-244-67462-5 (2011)
- NIX4 [limited edition] (2013)
- Around The Table (2015)
- The Big Connection (2015)
- NetWorker Deck (2016)
- Loyalty (2016)
- Trade Show Mentalism - Lecture Notes (2016)
- Choose Me (2017)
- Cool Beans (2017)
- Certified Mentalism (2018)
- Inflated Ego (2019)
- Mind Menus (2019)
- Mistress Memory (2019)
- The Copenhagen Cover-Up (2020)
- The Pen Game (2020)
- Birdie Num Nums (2020)
- Getting Into Shape (2020)
- Threeform Though (2020)
- Imp-Ossible (2020)
- Monosemy (2020)
- Photobomb (2021)
- Clearly Psychic (2021)
- Murder in the Matrix (2021)
- Show Me Your Hands (2021)
- Change Of Mind (2021)
- The Cracker (2021)
- Mental Tours (2021)
- It's Your Choice [limited edition] (2022)
- Hired & Fired Professional [limited edition] (2022)
- Not-A-Lotto (2022)

Brook's works have been praised by a long list of prominent members within the field of mentalism, such as Andy Nyman, Bob Cassidy, Marc Salem, Keith Barry, Marc Paul, John Archer, Jeff McBride, Richard Osterlind, Colin Cloud, to name a few.
