= 1089 (number) =

← 1088	1089	1090 →
- List of numbers; Integers; ← 0 1k 2k 3k 4k 5k 6k 7k 8k 9k →
- Cardinal: one thousand eighty-nine
- Ordinal: 1089th (one thousand eighty-ninth)
- Factorization: 3^{2} × 11^{2}
- Divisors: 1, 3, 9, 11, 33, 99, 121, 363, 1089
- Greek numeral: ,ΑΠΘ´
- Roman numeral: MLXXXIX, mlxxxix
- Binary: 10001000001_{2}
- Ternary: 1111100_{3}
- Senary: 5013_{6}
- Octal: 2101_{8}
- Duodecimal: 769_{12}
- Hexadecimal: 441_{16}

1089 is the integer and natural number following 1088 and preceding 1090.

== In mathematics ==
It is a square number (33 squared), a nonagonal number, a 32-gonal number, a 364-gonal number, and a centered octagonal number. 1089 is the first nontrivial decimal reverse-divisible number: multiplying 1089 by 9 gives 9801, the reversal of its digits.

The next is 2178 (= 1089 × 2 = 8712/4), and they are the only four-digit numbers (disregarding palindromes) that divide their reverse.

== In magic ==
1089 is widely used in magic tricks because it can be "produced" from any two three-digit numbers. This allows it to be used as the basis for a Magician's Choice. For instance, one variation of the book test starts by having the spectator choose any two suitable numbers and then apply some basic maths to produce a single four-digit number. That number is always 1089. The spectator is then asked to turn to page 108 of a book and read the 9th word, which the magician has memorized. To the audience it looks like the number is random, but through manipulation, the result is always the same.

In base 10, the following steps always yield 1089:

1. Take any three-digit number where the first and last digits differ by more than 1.
2. Reverse the digits, and subtract the smaller from the larger one.
3. Add to this result the number produced by reversing its digits.

For example, if the spectator chooses 237 (or 732):

732 − 237 = 495
495 + 594 = 1089

as expected. On the other hand, if the spectator chooses 102 (or 201):

201 − 102 = 99
99 + 99 ≠ 1089

contradicting the rule. However, if we amend the third rule by reading 99 as a three-digit number 099 and take its reverse, we obtain:

201 − 102 = 099
099 + 990 = 1089

as expected.

=== Explanation ===
The spectator's 3-digit number can be written as 100 × A + 10 × B + 1 × C, and its reversal as 100 × C + 10 × B + 1 × A, where 1 ≤ A ≤ 9, 0 ≤ B ≤ 9 and 1 ≤ C ≤ 9. Their difference is 99 × (A − C) (For convenience, we assume A > C; if A < C, we first swap A and C.). If A − C is 0, the difference is 0, and we do not get a 3-digit number for the next step. If A − C is 1, the difference is 99. Using a leading 0 gives us a 3-digit number for the next step.

99 × (A − C) can also be written as 99 × [(A − C) − 1] + 99 = 100 × [(A − C) − 1] − 1 × [(A − C) − 1] + 90 + 9 = 100 × [(A − C) − 1] + 90 + 9 − (A − C) + 1 = 100 × [(A − C) − 1] + 10 × 9 + 1 × [10 − (A − C)]. (The first digit is (A − C) − 1, the second is 9 and the third is 10 − (A − C). As 2 ≤ A − C ≤ 9, both the first and third digits are guaranteed to be single digits.)

Its reversal is 100 × [10 − (A − C)] + 10 × 9 + 1 × [(A − C) − 1]. The sum is thus 101 × [(A − C) − 1] + 20 × 9 + 101 × [10 − (A − C)] = 101 × [(A − C) − 1 + 10 − (A − C)] + 20 × 9 = 101 × [−1 + 10] + 180 = 1089.

=== Other properties ===
Multiplying the number 1089 by the integers from 1 to 9 produces a pattern: multipliers adding up to 10 give products that are the digit reversals of each other:

1 × 1089 = 1089 ↔ 9 × 1089 = 9801
2 × 1089 = 2178 ↔ 8 × 1089 = 8712
3 × 1089 = 3267 ↔ 7 × 1089 = 7623
4 × 1089 = 4356 ↔ 6 × 1089 = 6534
5 × 1089 = 5445 ↔ 5 × 1089 = 5445

Also note the patterns within each column:

1 × 1089 = 1089
2 × 1089 = 2178
3 × 1089 = 3267
4 × 1089 = 4356
5 × 1089 = 5445
6 × 1089 = 6534
7 × 1089 = 7623
8 × 1089 = 8712
9 × 1089 = 9801

Numbers formed analogously in other bases, e.g. octal 1067 or hexadecimal 10EF, also have these properties.

== Extragalactic astronomy ==
The numerical value of the cosmic microwave background radiation redshift is about z = 1089 (z = 0 corresponds to present time)

== Other uses ==
- In the Rich Text Format, the language code 1089 indicates the text is in Swahili.
