= Forced choice =

Forced choice may refer to:

- Ipsative, a question that compares two options (in social science)
- Forcing (magic)

== See also ==
- Two-alternative forced choice – Method to measure individual sensitivity
