= The Piddingtons =

Australian mentalist couple

Lesley and Sydney Piddington
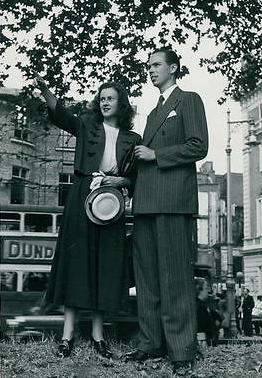
- Occupation: Mentalists

Sydney Piddington (14 May 1918 – 29 January 1991) and Lesley Piddington (1925 – 2 August 2016) were an Australian husband and wife mentalism team who performed as The Piddingtons and gave one of the most famous stage and radio telepathy acts of modern times. The Piddingtons never revealed their methods but did not claim to possess paranormal powers. There has been speculation from magicians about how they may have utilized codes, confederates or mechanical aids.

== History ==
Sydney Piddington spent time in Changi Prisoner of War camp during World War II. He discovered that maintaining the morale of prisoners in the camp was essential, and worked with fellow prisoner of war Russell Braddon to develop a mentalism act as entertainment for the troops. During this time, Sydney developed many unique and innovative techniques to give the appearance of mind-reading. Other fellow prisoners at Changi included Ronald Searle, who made sketches of life in the POW camp, and actor John Wood, with whom Piddington travelled home to Australia.

Following the war, Sydney married Lesley Pope, to whom John Wood introduced him at a homecoming party given for Wood by the Minerva Theatre. Pope was the leading lady in the theatre's current production. Sydney taught Lesley many of the tricks that he had developed. Together they designed a stage act, and found success on Australian stages. Soon after, the Piddingtons moved to London, and in time they were signed to present a series of live radio broadcasts for the BBC. Seeking ever-impressive stunts, Sydney masterminded specialized tests to demonstrate Lesley's alleged ability to receive thoughts over a great distance.

== The BBC Broadcasts ==
Many of the original radio broadcasts are still available. Among the more famous demonstrations undertaken by the Piddingtons were:

The Diving Bell Experiment - Lesley was submerged in a diving bell in a swimming pool in Surrey whilst Sydney conducted tests with a live audience at the BBC studios in central London.

The Tower of London - Lesley was kept under armed guard at the Tower of London across the river from the BBC studios, and was still able to determine items and names from the live audience.

The Stratocruiser Broadcast - A famous experiment where Lesley was taken to cruising altitude in a plane above a British military base. Amongst other demonstrations, she was able to determine the personal possessions of an audience member chosen at random by the panel of judges in the studio.

== Secrecy of the Act ==
The methods behind the Piddingtons' act were a closely guarded secret, unknown even to the producers at the BBC. Following Sydney's death in 1991, Lesley is said to have told her grandson, "Even if I wanted to tell you how it was done, I don't think I would be able".

To this day, The Piddingtons are considered to be one of the greatest two-person telepathy acts of all time. Magicians have speculated that they may have utilized codes, confederates or mechanical aids.

The controls for their experiments have been criticized. Regarding their experiment that took place in the Tower of London, Lesley had produced a sentence that had been written on a blackboard in the BBC studio. However, the sentence had already been read on the radio to listeners. Psychologist Robert H. Thouless noted that "no examination of Mrs Piddington's clothes or hair seems to have been made to ensure that she had not a wireless receiving set concealed on her person."

In 2015, Martin Hart published a book which claimed to have finally revealed the secrets to the Piddingtons' tricks. The book is based on a notebook by Hart's grandfather who observed their methods while working on the BBC broadcasts.

In 2014, Radiolab produced an episode on The Piddingtons, and later asked Penn Jillette to comment. He discusses two of the tricks, one from the Stratrocruiser episode, and another from the Diving Bell. In the first, audience members write a short message or doodle on paper and place it into sealed numbered envelopes. Two are then selected from the audience members which Lesley correctly guesses. Jillette noted that the only reason to pick two envelopes initially was to disguise the fact that neither was ultimately used; Sydney switched the envelopes with ones containing pre-arranged messages. Had they selected only a single envelope, the audience member would have immediately noticed when Lesley announced a different answer, but with two selections, both audience members concluded they selected the other person's envelope. The second example is a classic example of a book test, a trick that goes back hundreds of years. In the book test, some sort of method is used so that the same passage is selected every time. In some variations, this is accomplished with trick books, in others, some sort of magician's force is used. The complex method of selecting the passage using mathematics suggests the latter method was used. Jillette notes that the whole show rests on a single misdirection; while the audience is trying to figure out the secret method that Sydney is using to talk to Lesley given the strange settings like being underwater, the real trick is that no communication is required and everything is pre-arranged.

== See also ==
- Julius and Agnes Zancig
