= Haim Goldenberg =

Israeli-Canadian mentalist (born 1975)

Haim Goldenberg (born August 5, 1975) is an Israeli-Canadian mentalist, corporate entertainer, and host of the television series GoldMind.

In August 2002 Haim was invited to participate in the world's largest magic convention in New York City. He introduced a unique kit called “Magic Interactive” which garnered him coverage in Newsweek magazine.

In 2003, Goldenberg settled in Toronto, Ontario, Canada and was soon performing at major venues such as City Playhouse, Laugh Resort, and The Second City. Local newspapers and television stations took notice, and he appeared on CityTV's Breakfast Television and on Global News.

In 2008 Goldenberg went into production on a television series with WestWind Pictures for CanWest. The half-hour series entitled GoldMind premiered in March 2009, and airs Sundays on TVtropolis. Hypnotist Dave Curran and Mentalist and author, James Biss, we’re consultants to the series.

Goldenberg has also established himself as a corporate entertainer, and is also popular in diplomatic circles. He has performed at the embassies of Peru, Italy and the United States. Goldenberg is a member of the [International Brotherhood of Magicians and the Psychic Entertainer Association.
