= Bert Reese =

American spiritualist (1841–1926)

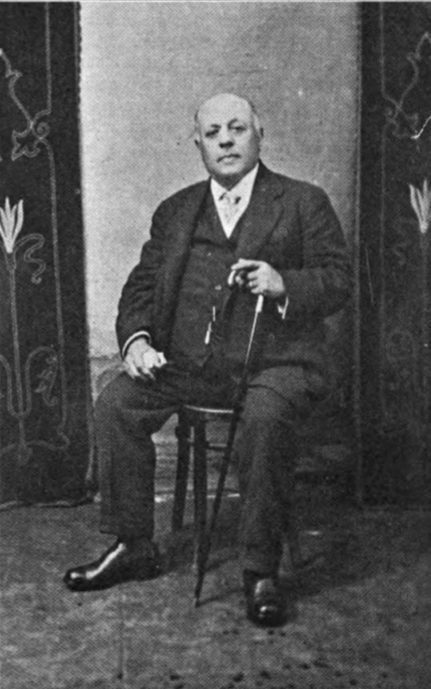
- Born: 1841; Posen, Prussia
- Died: 1926 (aged 84–85)
- Occupations: Medium, mentalist

Bert Reese (1841–1926) was an American-Polish medium and mentalist, best known for his billet reading demonstrations.

== Biography ==
Reese was born Berthold Riess in Posen. He was a spiritualist and friend of Aleister Crowley. He claimed to possess the ability of x-ray vision. He drew criticism from magicians of the period who could replicate his billet reading feats by trick methods.

Reese was an expert billet reader. In 1915, Reese was convicted by a magistrate as a fortune teller. He appealed his conviction and agreed to demonstrate his abilities by taking a test. At the court hearing in New York, Judge Rosalsky wrote three questions on a slip of paper. Reese successfully told the judge what the questions were. The charge was dropped and he was released.

The famous inventor Thomas Edison was duped by the billet reading tricks of Reese and stated he was "neither a medium nor a fake".

Psychical researcher Eric Dingwall who observed Reese in New York City claimed to have discovered his cheating methods. According to Dingwall, the exploits of Reese were "not worth any serious scientific consideration" and he came into contact with the sealed notes. Walter Franklin Prince also observed Reese's method of sleight of hand.

The controversy surrounding Reese led The New York Times journalist Edward Marshall to write two articles in November, 1910 with illustrations and suggested methods of how Reese performed his tricks. His tricks were also exposed by magician Samri Frikell who replicated his feats.

In 1920, in a letter to Arthur Conan Doyle, magician Harry Houdini wrote that during a séance he had observed Reese's tricks. Houdini noted that Reese had managed to deceive Edison, Judge Rosalsky and many others who were inexperienced in magic trickery. Houdini commented that "Reese knew who I was, when I called for a sitting, and I will say that, of all the clever sleight-of-hand men he is the brainiest I have ever come across".

== Aftermath ==
Magic historians consider Reese to have been an expert mentalist.

In 1938, magic historian John Mulholland noted that "Reese was extraordinarily clever in misleading and confusing his subjects regarding what really happened... he was an extraordinary sleight-of-hand performer; certainly nothing more.” In 1950, magician Joseph Rinn revealed the billet reading tricks of Reese.

Science writer Martin Gardner wrote that Reese was an expert mentalist no different from stage magicians of the period such as Joseph Dunninger but managed to fool a number of people into believing he was a genuine psychic. The most detailed account at exposing his tricks (with diagrams) was by mentalist Theodore Annemann.
