= Alexander J. McIvor-Tyndall =

English-American mentalist

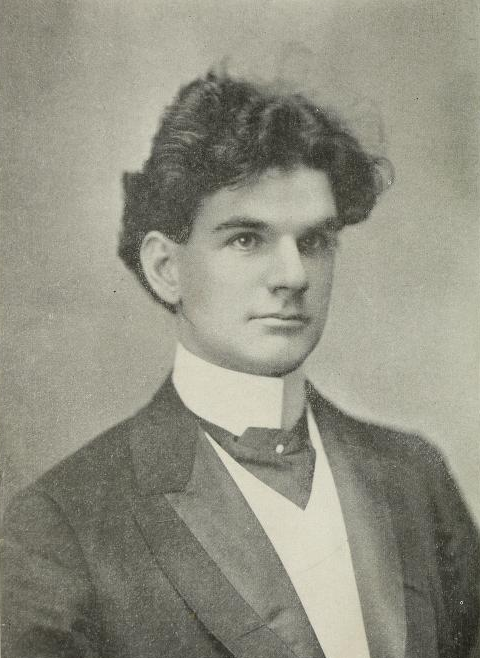
- Born: March 4, 1860; Leicestershire
- Died: 1940 (aged 79–80); California
- Occupations: Mentalist, writer

Alexander James McIvor-Tyndall (March 4, 1860 – 1940), also known as Ali Nomad, was an English-American hypnotist, mentalist and New Thought writer.

== Biography ==
McIvor-Tyndall was born in Leicestershire to Dr. Alexander and Agnes Stuart. In 1890, McIvor-Tyndall gave theosophical lectures in Canada. He was theosophical editor of Denver Sunday Post (1906–1907) and edited The Swastika: A Magazine of Triumph (1906–1911) an occult magazine. He founded the International New Thought Fellowship and in 1907, Swastika headquarters in the United States. He was the founder of the International Swastika Society.

McIvor-Tyndall wrote under the pseudonyms Ali Nomad and Dr. John Lockwood. In 1913, under the pseudonym Ali Nomad he authored the book Cosmic Consciousness: The Man-God Whom We Await. In the book he promoted the idea that Ramakrishna Paramahamsa was the latest incarnation of God in India.

McIvor-Tyndall married Margaret Logan of Los Angeles on September 3, 1896. He married Laura Hudson Wray on June 13, 1917 in Crown Point, Indiana. In total he married six times.

== Career ==
McIvor-Tyndall was notable for performing the blindfold drive. This involved driving a carriage through crowded streets blindfolded whilst reading the thoughts of the man seated beside him. In 1893, McIvor-Tyndall requested the St. Louis Republic to appoint a committee to ride with him in a carriage. Theodore Dreiser was present on the committee and authored several articles about McIvor-Tyndall's successful "mind-reading" demonstrations. However, in 1896 he was arrested in Sacramento, California because he was driving a carriage too fast. He was also known for his "death-trances", it was alleged that he could cheat death and return to life. Skeptics dismissed McIvor-Tyndall as a fakir. His mind-reading demonstrations were similar to the mentalist Washington Irving Bishop.

In the late 1890s, McIvor-Tyndall worked as a palmist, giving lectures and private palm reading sessions. In 1902, he performed successful billet reading tests that impressed Eugene Schmitz the mayor of San Francisco and several city officials. In 1908, McIvor-Tyndall became known as a psychic sleuth in Los Angeles. Whilst blindfolded he aimed to direct a posse assembled by Col. E. J. Bell to a murderer. He stated that he had received a vision of the murderer whilst in a trance in Denver. McIvor-Tyndall was involved with other criminal cases, for example years earlier in 1893 he was given permission to hypnotise convicted murderer Jacob Menze. After the hypnotic test, McIvor-Tyndall declared Menze to be innocent.

In 1909, McIvor-Tyndall gave many public demonstrations and lectures on his alleged clairvoyant powers including automatic writing, precognition, psychometry and telepathy. In 1912, he gave lectures on cosmic consciousness, immortality and psychic phenomena.

== Selected publications ==
- Revelations of the Hand (1900)
- Ghosts: A Message from the Illuminati (1906)
- How to Read Thought (1909)
- Cosmic Consciousness: The Man-God Whom We Await (1913)
- Sex: The Unknown Quantity: The Spiritual Function of Sex (1916)

== Appearances in fiction ==
- Rudkin, JC. “Your Plaintive Cries.” Erie Tales 14: Secrets Anthology. Ed. Great Lakes Association of Horror Writers. 2022. ISBN 979-8-7814-5599-7
