= Koran (surname) =

Koran is a surname with multiple origins. Notable people with the surname include:

- Al Koran (1914–1972), British mentalist
- Mark Koran (born 1964), American politician
- Rajan Koran (born 1981), Malaysian footballer

== See also ==
- Jaroslav Kořán (1940–2017), Czech politician and writer
