= Book test =

Magic trick

The book test is a classic mentalism demonstration used by mentalists to demonstrate telepathy-like effects. The name refers to its early use as a test of mental powers.

== Effect ==
An audience member (the "spectator") is called onstage to assist the mentalist. The spectator is shown one or more books, and asked to read a random passage from one of them. The passage may be revealed to the audience, or recorded in some other way for later comparison. The mentalist then typically presents a routine to establish an atmosphere or back story, and proceeds to read the spectator's mind to reveal elements relating to the passage read by the spectator.

== History ==
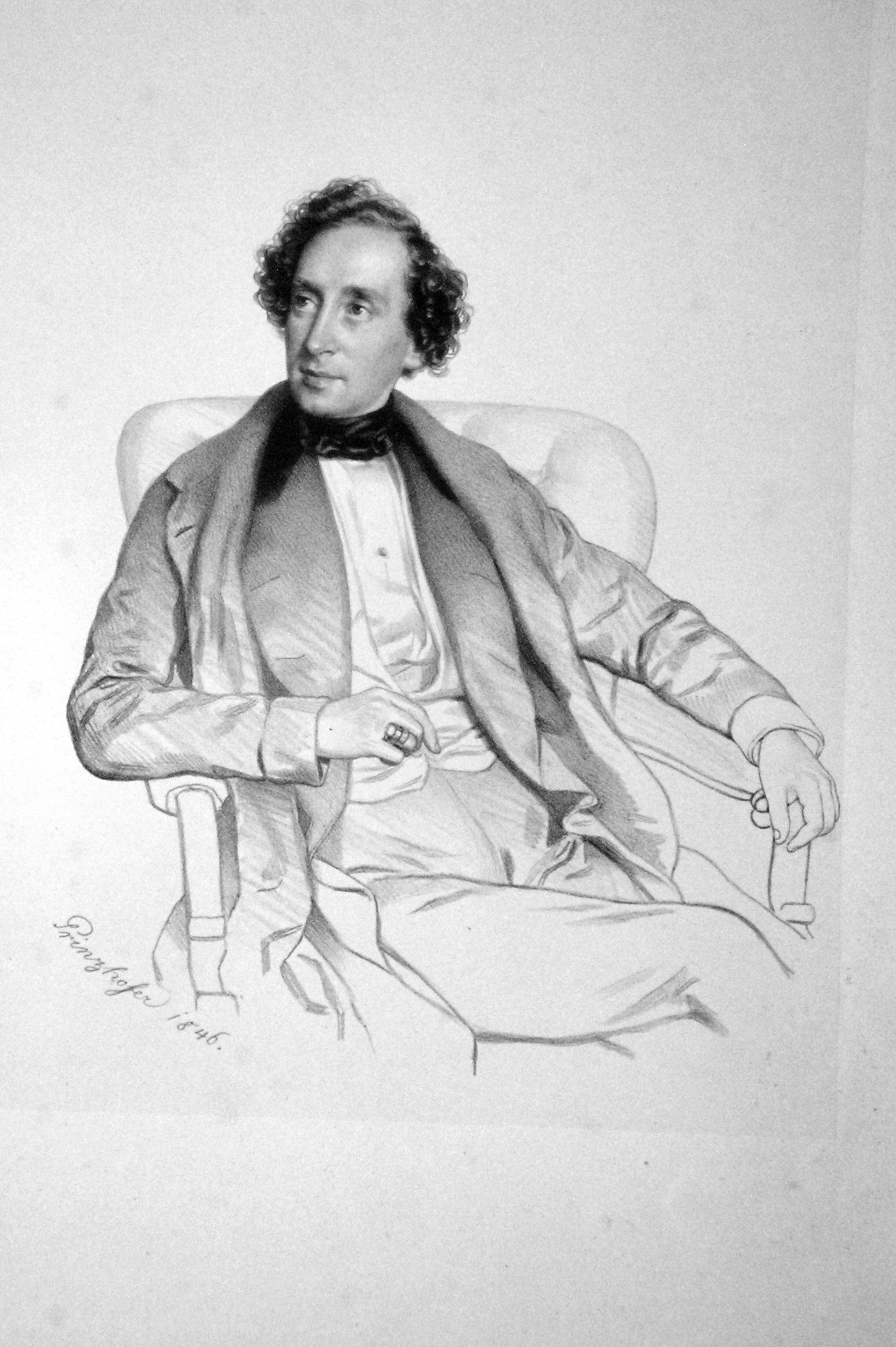
Johann Nepomuk Hofzinser introduced the first modern example of the book test.

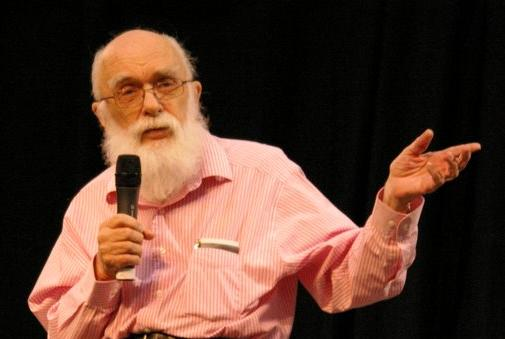
James Randi often performed the trick.

Books have been used as props as long ago as the 1450s. In one particularly common trick, the "blow book", spectators would blow on the pages of a book which would then reveal images, colors, or text. However, these were not similar to modern book tests, as the "magic" was simply the change in appearance. (Note: When the history of book tests are discussed, it is common to see a reference to ancient Egypt as the earliest mention. These refer to a series of stories about Se-Osiris and his father Setna Khaemuast, imperial scribe for Rameses the Great. In one story, Se-Osiris is able to read the contents of a sealed scroll, and thereby prove the superiority of Egyptian magicians. The events are described in magical terms, and whether or not any sort of event like this took place is unknown, nor is it clear if this is anything like a book test, or more likely, billet reading. See "Se-Osiris and the Sealed Letter", National Taiwan University)

The modern concept of the book test involves the magician revealing a word, phrase, or image that the spectator has selected at random. The earliest known example is a variation on the modern Twenty One Card Trick, in which a series of operations reveals the chosen item through basic mathematics. The magician first asks a spectator to choose a word or figure on a starting page. An associated number, say the column or group that the figure appears in, is used to select another page. For instance, if the spectator picks a figure in column two, they might flip forward two pages. Here the spectator sees the same figure somewhere else on the page, and repeats the process. After three flips the magician stops them and reveals the figure.

It is known that a version of this sort of book test was created by well-known publisher Girolamo Scotto and demonstrated for the Emperor of Austria in 1572. However, printed versions from this time are not extant. The earliest surviving example was found by Italian magician Vanni Bossi in the book Il Laberinto, originally published in 1607 by Andrea Ghisi. An English translation was published in 1610 under the title Wits laberynth, or, the exercise of idlenesse. It is believed Wits laberynth was the inspiration for the same trick in Nicholas Hunt's Newe Recreations, published in London in 1631.

Modern variations of the original "labyrinth" concept using gimmicked books are widespread, although they vary greatly in nature. The first modern example is widely suggested to have been introduced by Johann Nepomuk Hofzinser sometime between 1865 and 1875, generally known simply as "The Word". Variations using a single page that can be inserted into other books, sometimes known as the "True Test" or "Modern Magazine Test", were first developed by in the 1930s by U. F. Grant, a well-known inventor of magic tricks.

Modern variations on the book test generally use a different methodology. This method has been a staple of mentalist acts throughout the 20th century. One of the best known variations of this trick was repeatedly performed by The Piddingtons, whose version included elaborate stagecraft that placed Lesley Piddington, the "reader", in a variety of bizarre locations, from London Tower to a diving bell. James Randi used the trick as a staple of his impromptu shows, selecting among a wide variety of methods at whim.

This new method was first revealed in written form by magician David Hoy and published in his 1963 The Bold and Subtle Miracles of Dr. Faust, the "Bold Book Test" is widely considered a classic and inventive trick. The trick, often with Hoy's name removed, has been published in dozens of books and pamphlets.

== Method ==
There are many versions of the book test. The magician may use a single book, a single page or multiple books. In each case there are multiple variants. Methods using more than one book generally used unmodified books, or naturals. These can be distinguished because the mentalist hands the books to the spectator to choose among, and has some sort of riffle or fast flipping of the pages later in the trick. Methods using a modified book, a gimmick, allow free selection of the word from any page. In cases using the dictionary test principle, the magician holds the book in front of them, facing out.

=== Natural two-book force, or Bold book test ===
Hoy's version of the book test uses two unmodified books and a magician's force. Prior to the performance, the mentalist memorizes a single word or passage from one of the books, the force book. They may also ask the spectator to choose a book from their own bookshelf, and then quickly read a passage from it while the spectator is occupied selecting a second book from the shelf.

The mentalist then asks the spectator to pick one of the two books, but uses a force to ensure they always pick the one containing the memorized word. The simplest method is to ask the user to point to their chosen book. If they choose the force book, the magician simply hands it to them. If the spectator points the non-force book, the magician keeps it and hands the spectator the force book. In either case, the spectator is left holding the force book.

To force the page, a number of methods are used. The most common has the mentalist leaf through the non-force book at high speed and asks the spectator to call "stop" at any point. When the spectator stops him, the mentalist states that they have stopped on a certain page and asks the spectator to open the force book to the same page. It does not matter when the spectator calls "stop"; the magician always says they have stopped on the page with the memorized term.

The spectator is then asked to read a passage on the page, perhaps the first line. The mentalist then recites the memorized passage.

==== Multi-book forces ====
It is possible to turn the two-book force into a three-book force simply by adapting the choice made the second time. If the spectator chooses the force book on the first attempt, that book is handed to them and the trick proceeds as before. If they choose one of the non-force books, it is placed aside and they are asked to choose again. If that second choice is the force book, it is handed to them; otherwise it, too, is discarded and the force book is handed to them. Although it is possible to extend this process past three books, it becomes increasingly obvious that a force is taking place if the force book is selected with the mentalist still holding multiple books and has to set them all aside. There are dozens of variations; Theodore Annemann's Practical Mental Magic describes fourteen in a single chapter and refers to more within the text.

=== Mnemonic gimmicks ===
Another major class of book tests involves a mnemonic device to distribute "money words" across a page. For instance, a given page might have the word "Abermarle" on it, and this would be the only "proper name" that starts with the letter A and the spectator would be invited to select a proper name beginning with A. "Hybrid" systems replace the gimmick book with a single gimmick page, which is styled and sized to fit within a target magazine or book. The mentalist must prepare the book themselves, inserting the page into any suitable book or magazine. For this version, the mentalist must use some form of an equivocation to ensure the spectator chooses the right page. There are a wide variety of forces used for this purpose.

In both cases the spectator is handed the gimmicked book, or allowed to select among many similar examples. The spectator is then instructed to open and select a word off the page, with the word selection being limited, for example only allowing "odd words" or "proper names." The mentalist then asks the spectator a single question, typically "what is the first letter of the word you are thinking of?" They then apply the mnemonic to return the word, and reveal.

There are a variety of systems used to create the word selection. The original method, called "The Word," was developed by U.F. Grant, but a number of variations exist. All require some preparation to use properly.

=== Dictionary gimmicks ===
The "dictionary test" is a gimmicked book test that anyone can prepare using any book, but works best with dictionaries, encyclopedias, books of lists, or other texts where there is some sort of obvious first word that is called out in the text.

Using a dictionary, the gimmick is prepared by finding the first defined word on the left page, which is normally bolded or printed in larger text, and writing it in fine pencil on the top of the right page. The magician then holds the book open in front of the spectator and riffles with the left hand, and asks the spectator to call "stop" at any point. The magician then points to the upper right corner (blindly, as the book is still facing away from the magician) and while the spectator is looking there, peeks at the other corner, which is turned just enough to be visible.

A commercial variation of the dictionary test is known as "Flashback," and comes in the form of a complete gimmicked book. Instead of the word appearing faintly at the top of the page, it is arranged so the last word on the left page is the same as the first word on the right page. In some forms the antonym appears on the mirror page, instead of the same word. For instance, if the word "day" appears as the first word on the left page, a straight flashback would put the word "day" on the left page, while an antonym version puts "night" there instead. Flashback variations are often incorporated in gimmick books supporting other methods as well.

=== Other variations ===
The "Page, Line and Word" trick uses two or three spectators, handing one a book (the "reader"), another an envelope, and the third pencil and paper (the "writer"). The writer is asked to imagine opening the book and selecting a word at random, and then writes down the page, line and word number they imagined. The magician then palms the writer's slip and hands a prepared slip to the reader, who opens the book to the selected section. The third spectator then opens the envelope to reveal the same word.

The "1089 force" is a natural that relies on the mathematical manipulation of three-digit numbers such that the answer to a series of seemingly random operations will always result in the number 1089. The spectator is then asked to turn to page 108 and read the 9th word. Mathematical forces of this sort, similar to the original "labyrinth" type tests, are no longer common as these are widely known to the audience.

The "coin force," which can be performed with a number of props instead of coins, is essentially a combination of the natural and the flashback concepts. A word or statement from a natural is selected, and then some sort of marker, normally a quarter, is inserted in that page near the spine. As the magician riffles the book, they can easily flip to that page when the spectator calls "stop". This relies on nothing other than the magician holding the book firmly by the spine while it is riffled, both to obscure the coin as well as to keep it from falling out.
