= Princess Mysteria =

African American newspaper columnist and magician

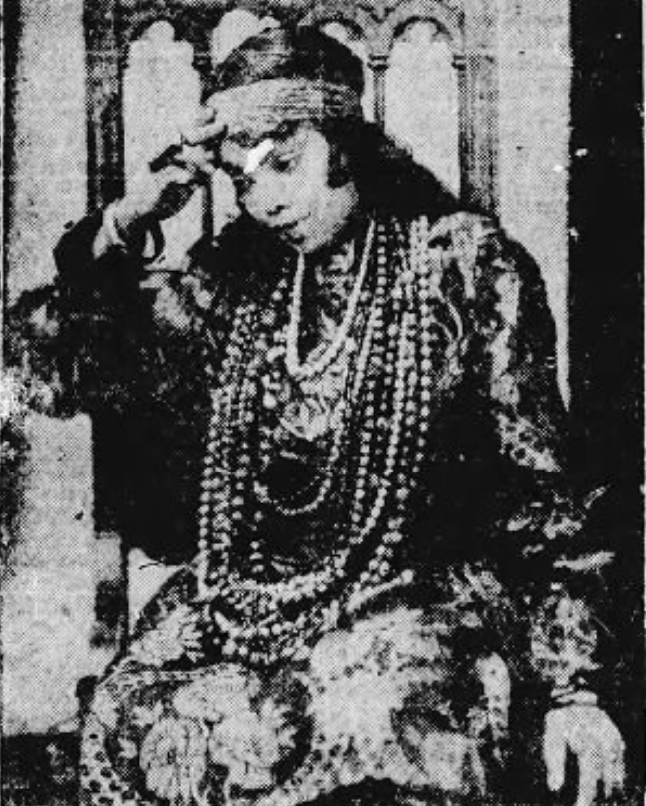
- Born: Vauleda Hill
- Died: March 14, 1930; Chicago, Illinois, U.S.
- Other name: Vauleda Hill Strodder
- Occupations: Vaudeville performer, mentalist, radio entertainer, newspaper advice columnist

Princess Mysteria (stage name of Vauleda Hill Strodder, 1888 – March 14, 1930) was an American mentalist and vaudeville performer, who made radio broadcasts and wrote an advice column for The Chicago Defender.

== Biography ==
Vauleda Hill was born in an American family in 1888 and grew up in Kansas City, Missouri, but identifying her exact birthplace is made difficult by her insistence that she was born "at the foot of the Mahali Mountains in India, near Bombay."

The story as she told it is that she developed skills as a mentalist as a child and, by the age of six, was able to answer questions before they were asked. Impressed by her performance, the Rajah of Bengal made her a princess. Historians agree that this was just a legend created to promote her performances, and note that it was not uncommon for African American women claiming "occult" powers to advertise themselves as Indian.

With her parents, Vauleda moved from Kansas City to Chicago, where she married Al C. Strodder. In the 1910s, she started performing as "Princess Mysteria," assisted by her husband, who went under the name "Prince Mysteria." She dressed in exotic costumes, with beads, jewels and a headband. She also performed as a mentalist, calling herself a "human radio," on the waves of WJKS, a radio station in Gary, Indiana. She was one of the most applauded mentalists in the United States.

Mysteria also became famous for dispensing her wisdom weekly on her own column, called "Advice to the Wise and Otherwise," in the African American newspaper The Chicago Defender from 1920 to 1930. She died unexpectedly, after a short illness, on March 14, 1930, in Chicago. The Chicago Defender commented that, "from roughly 1917 until her death in 1930, no other female magician and few male magicians received as much coverage in the black press as she did."
