= 9801 (number) =

← 9800	9801	9802 →
- List of numbers; Integers; ← 0 1k 2k 3k 4k 5k 6k 7k 8k 9k →
- Cardinal: nine thousand eight hundred one
- Ordinal: 9801st (nine thousand eight hundred first)
- Factorization: 3^{4} × 11^{2}
- Divisors: 1, 3, 9, 11, 27, 33, 81, 99, 121, 297, 363, 891, 1089, 3267, 9801
- Greek numeral: ,ΘΩΑ´
- Roman numeral: I̅X̅DCCCI, i̅x̅dccci
- Binary: 10011001001001_{2}
- Ternary: 111110000_{3}
- Senary: 113213_{6}
- Octal: 23111_{8}
- Duodecimal: 5809_{12}
- Hexadecimal: 2649_{16}

9801 (nine thousand eight hundred [and] one) is the natural number following 9800 and preceding 9802.

== In mathematics ==
9801 is most notable for being the third, and only 4-digit square pentagonal number, since 9801 is a square number, which can be written as: $99^2$, and it is also a pentagonal number, since it can also be written as: $\frac{81\cdot(3\cdot81-1)}{2} = \frac{81\cdot242}{2}$. 9801 is also the number that is below 10,000 which are integral multiples of their reversals. (Note: It is also known as a palintiple.) The only other number which has this property is 8712. 9801 is the sixth number such as the binomial coefficient (Note: Which is: $\frac{n}{2}$) is a perfect square. 9801 is a part of one of the first few pairs of consecutive powerful numbers with 9800 (9800, 9801).
