= Emma Cecilia Thursby =

American singer (1845–1931)

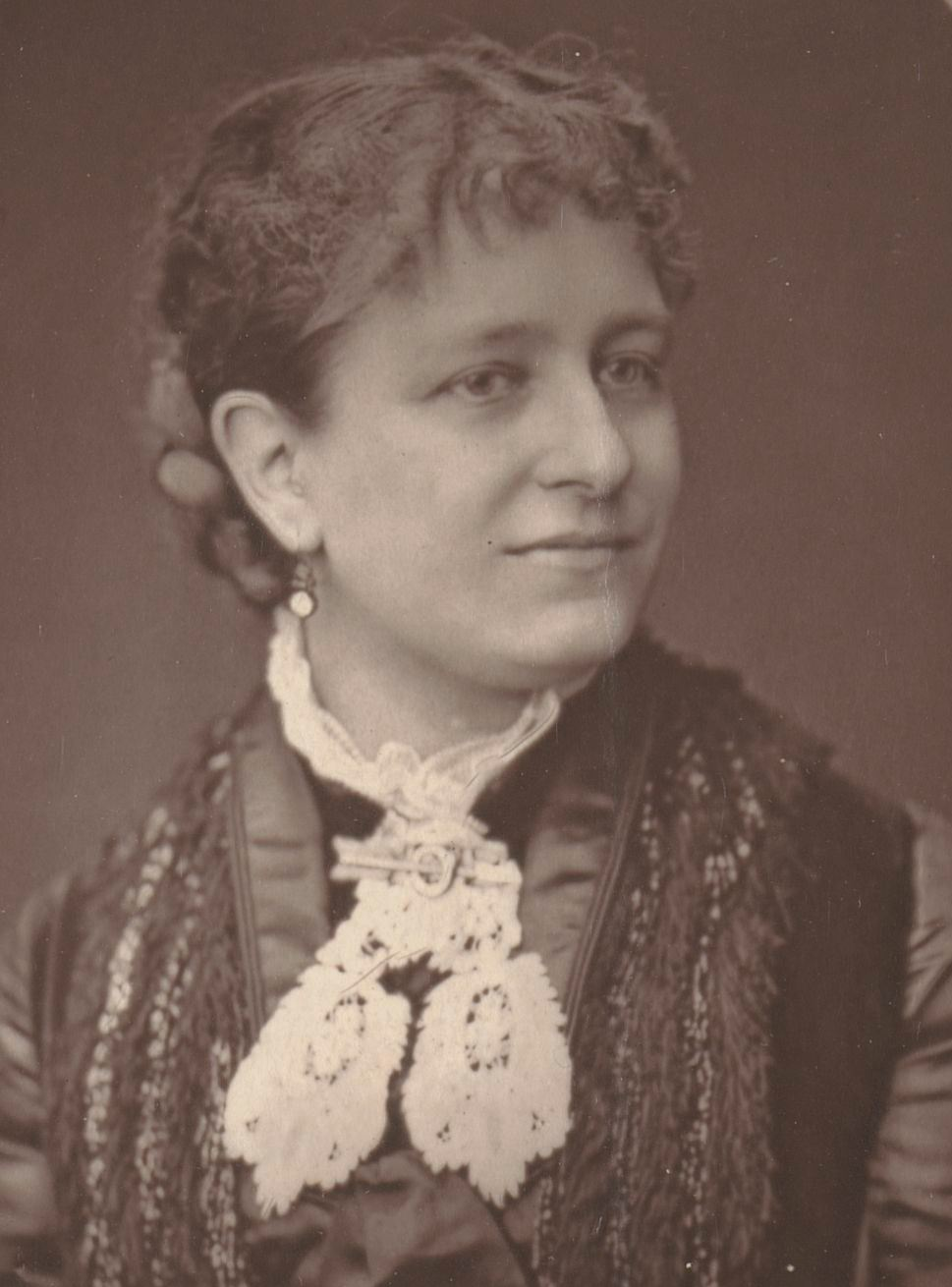

Background information
- Born: February 21, 1845; Williamsburg, Brooklyn, United States
- Died: July 4, 1931 (aged 86) New York City, United States
- Occupations: Singer, professor
- Years active: 1874–1884

Emma Cecilia Thursby (February 21, 1845 – July 4, 1931) was an American singer popular in Europe and the United States.

== Biography ==
Thursby was born to John Barnes Thursby, a rope manufacturer, and Jane Ann (Bennett) Thursby. She grew up in Williamsburg, Brooklyn, and first began to sing in the Old Bushwick (Dutch) Reformed Church. In 1857, she enrolled in the Bethlehem Female Seminary and trained with Sylvester and Francis Wolle. She continued to sing in church choirs in Brooklyn and Boston.

In the late 1860s and early 1870s, Thursby sang with performers including Ole Bull and Theodore Thomas. In 1874, she drew acclaim performing in concerts with Patrick Gilmore's 22nd Regiment Band at venues including the Philadelphia Academy of Music. She took voice lessons from Hermine Küchenmeister-Rudersdorf.

Her voice was notable for its clarity, power, and range (from middle C to E-flat above the staff). She was clearly popular with the public both in America and Europe. For example, a reviewer for the Cincinnati Commercial Tribune wrote in December 1880: "Thursby has a tremolo according to some critics, but it is the kind of a tremolo that is setting all musical people in Europe wild with admiration of the superior quality and sweetness of her voice, and the superbly artistic style of her execution of the silvery notes of her wonderful voice". Others were less forgiving. Alfred A. Wheeler in The Overland Monthly (July 1883) compares her voice unfavourably to Mrs Cole's even-toned "contralto voice of uncommon strength, richness, and compass" noting that "It is the absence of this same power of sustaining the evenness of tone, and the substitution for it of a disagreeable vibrato, which is the most serious drawback to the sweetness and dexterity of Miss Thursby’s light soprano". A reviewer for The Salt Lake Tribune (June 1891) noted that her "hop-skip-and-jump, twittering, chirping, tremolo style, was disappointing".

In 1875, she performed in concert with Hans von Bülow at Chickering Hall, and in the following year, appeared with Mark Twain in a series of programs for the Redpath Lyceum. She signed a $100,000 contract with Maurice Strakosch to tour throughout North America, and later performed in London, France, and Germany. Thursby was the first American awarded the medal of the Société des Concerts of the Paris Conservatory in 1881.

After 1884, after the death of her mother and sister and as she wearied of traveling for concerts, she performed less frequently. She later became a teacher, and taught as professor of music at the Institute of Musical Art (now Juilliard School) in New York from 1905–11. Her pupils included Geraldine Farrar. Later in life, she traveled extensively and promoted the lectures of Swami Vivekananda, a Hindu monk.

Thursby died at her home in Gramercy Park, New York City, in 1931. Her papers are held at the New-York Historical Society.

== Mynah bird ==
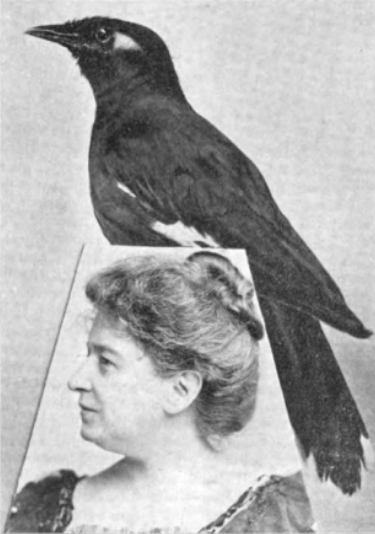
Portrait of Thursby with her Mynah bird.

Thursby also became well known for her Mynah bird which was alleged to have sung in five languages English, French, German, Malay, and Chinese. Skeptical investigator Joseph Rinn investigated the bird and confirmed the claim was true "I was dumbfounded, for the bird sang and took suggestions just as a human being would. There could be no doubt that he understood what was said to him, and he replied in a tone that sounded like a mezzo-soprano." According to Rinn, the bird had also been taught to play the piano by Thursby. When Rinn was present in the room, the bird played Home, Sweet Home successfully by walking on the correct keys.

After the bird died in 1899, medical societies from New York City requested permission to make an autopsy on the bird, and Thursby agreed. The autopsy was conducted by physician Henry Holbrook Curtis and veterinarian Frank H. Miller. They discovered that the bird had an extraordinarily large brain and this was responsible for the bird's great abilities.
