= Joseph F. Rinn =

American magician and skeptic of paranormal phenomena

Joseph Rinn
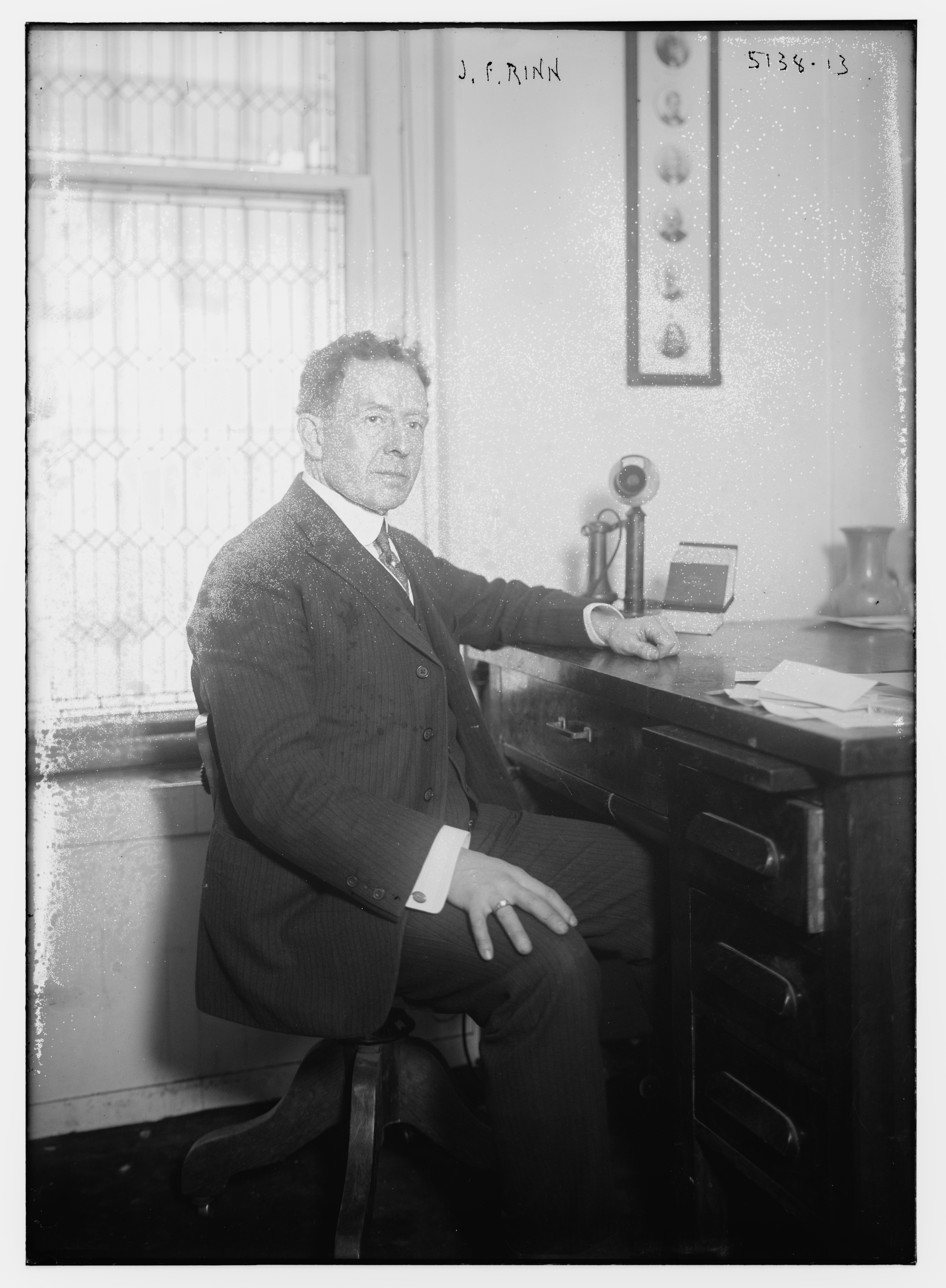
- Occupations: Magician, spiritualist debunker

Joseph Francis Rinn (1868–1952) was an American magician and skeptic of paranormal phenomena.

== Career ==
Rinn grew up in New York City. He coached Harry Houdini as a teenager in running at the Pastime Athletic Club. He remained a friend to Houdini and exposed many fraudulent mediums throughout his career. His sister, Bridgette, was a Catholic nun.

He was a former one-year member of the American Society for Psychical Research and a lifelong inquirer into psychic matters. He was a member of the Society of American Magicians. Rinn was notable for describing the tricks of physical mediums. He exposed the billet reading of Bert Reese. Science writer Martin Gardner has noted that Rinn had provided "good description of one of Reese's billet-reading performances, with an explanation of how he did it."

Rinn would offer huge amounts of money, up to $10,000 to anyone who could demonstrate a psychic event; however, as nobody ever did, the money went unclaimed. He was friends with another debunker of spiritualism the magician John Mulholland.

Rinn's work in debunking psychic phenomena has been praised by psychologists in the field of anomalistic psychology.

One claim that Rinn investigated that turned out to be true was the Mynah bird of Emma Cecilia Thursby that could sing in different languages and play the piano. According to Rinn an autopsy of the bird revealed an extraordinarily large brain and this was responsible for the bird's great abilities.

Rinn was an anti-vaccinationist. In 1911, he denounced smallpox vaccination.

== Metropolitan Psychical Society ==
Rinn became disillusioned with the American Society for Psychical Research as he believed they had failed to expose cases of psychic fraud so in 1905 he formed a skeptical group known as the Metropolitan Psychical Society. Notable skeptical members who were also magicians included Winfield S. Davis and James L. Kellogg.

In January, 1910 a series of séance sittings were held in the physics laboratory at Columbia University with the medium Eusapia Palladino. Scientists such as Robert W. Wood and Edmund Beecher Wilson attended. Davis, Kellogg, Rinn and John W. Sargent, a past-president of the Society of American Magicians were present in the last séance sittings in April. They discovered that Palladino had freed her left foot to perform the phenomena. Rinn gave a full account of fraudulent behavior observed in a séance of Palladino.

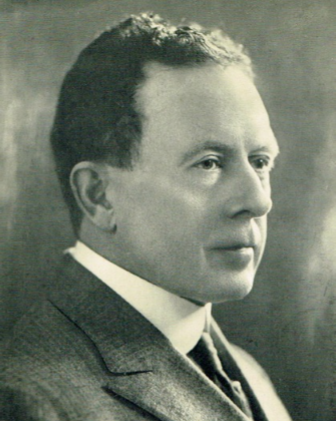
Joseph Rinn from his book Sixty Years of Psychical Research.

== Reception ==
Rinn's book Searchlight on Psychical Research (1954) was described in a review as the "death knell of spiritualism" as it exposed the fraud and tricks involved in spiritualist activities.

In the book A Skeptic's Handbook of Parapsychology (1985), authors Gerd H. Hövelmann, Marcello Truzzi and Piet Hein Hoebens described the book as:

A flawed but nonetheless very important critical work by a man prominent in conjuring circles (Rinn was a successful businessman and part-time magician and exposer/ investigator of spirit mediums) who has given us material in this that today appears nowhere else. Because Rinn deals with his own direct experiences and, especially, because he quotes at length from now obscure and forgotten newspaper records, the book is invaluable. It is a book full of opinions, gossip, and anecdotes, and it needs to be read that way — not as a work of objective scholarship. Aside from its wealth of detail, the book is also an important document showing the outlook of a strong skeptic.

Biographer William Lindsay Gresham noted that the book did contain inaccuracies but is valuable for its reprinting of clippings dealing with Harry Houdini.

Skeptic Melvin Harris wrote that the book has "many faults and inaccuracies, but for all that, it offers many hints to investigators and points researchers in many fruitful directions."

Commenting in 2013, Daniel Loxton has described the book as the "deepest and most important sources of skeptical literature on paranormal investigation from about 1890–1950."

== Publications ==
- Sixty Years of Psychical Research: Houdini and I Among the Spiritualists (New York: Truth Seeker Company, 1950). Reprinted in England as Searchlight on Psychical Research (London: Rider and Company, 1954)
