= The Jinx (magazine) =

American magic periodical

- The first page of The Jinx, Issue 1
- Publisher: Theodore Annemann
- First issue: October 1934
- Final issue Number: December 15, 1941; 151

The Jinx was a magic periodical edited and published by Theodore Annemann from October 1934 – December 1941. It was originally a monthly magazine but began weekly publication with no. 61 in October 1939. It has been described in M-U-M as "one of the greatest magazines ever published" and in The Linking Ring as "probably the greatest magic magazine of all time". Many publications have since followed the format of The Jinx. The complete magazine has been republished by Lou Tannen as a three volume facsimile.
