= Hermine Küchenmeister-Rudersdorf =

Ukrainian-American composer, teacher and writer (1822–1882)

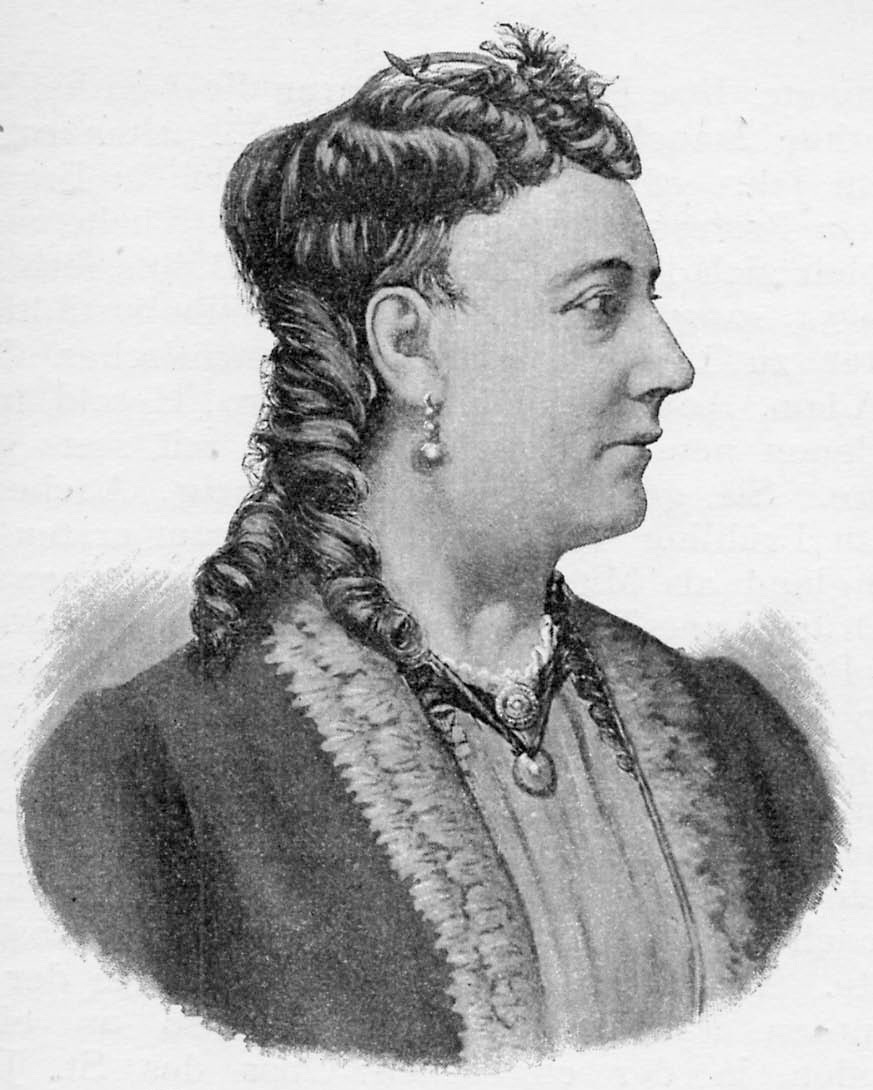
- Born: December 12, 1822
- Died: February 26, 1882 (aged 59); Boston, Massachusetts, US
- Era: Romantic
- Spouse(s): Karl Julius Küchenmeister; Maurice Mansfield
- Children: 4, including Richard
- Father: Johannes Andreas Rudersdorff

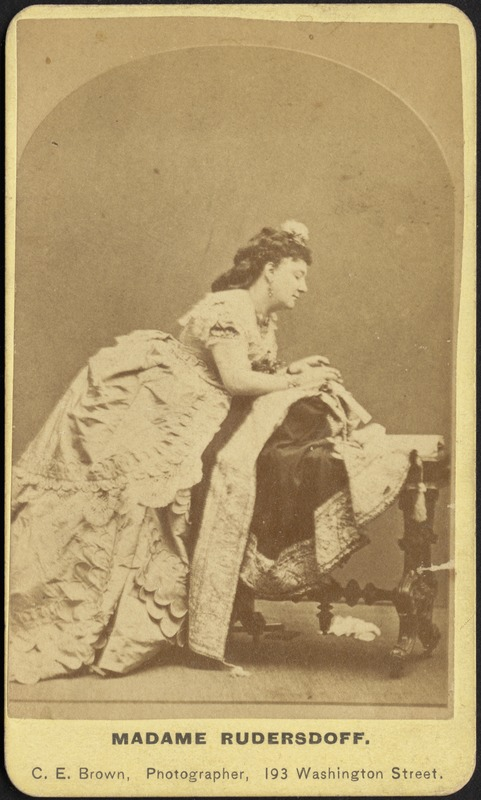
Madame Rudersdorff, ca. 1859–1870]; from the Carte de Visite Collection of the Boston Public Library

Hermine Küchenmeister-Rudersdorff (December 12, 1822 – February 26, 1882) was a Ukrainian composer, teacher and writer. She toured throughout Europe, then settled in America and died in Boston.

Rudersdorff’s father was the violinist Johannes Andreas Rudersdorff. She studied singing in Paris with Marco Bordogni and in Milan with de Micherout (also seen as de Micheroux). She was married twice: to Dr. Kuchenmeister, a professor of mathematics, and to Maurice Mansfield, a London wine merchant. She had four children: Greta, Felix, Henry and Richard. Richard Mansfield became a well-known actor.

Rudersdorff debuted in Leipzig, Germany, when she was the soprano soloist in Felix Mendelssohn’s cantata Lobgesang on June 25, 1840. Her English debut was on May 23, 1854, at Covent Garden's Theatre Royal on Drury Lane, where she sang in several operas. She appeared at the Royal Italian Opera in 1855.

In 1871 and 1872, Rudersdorff was engaged to sing at festivals in Boston, where she lived and taught until her death in 1882. Rudersdorff’s voice was considered very powerful, but not always beautiful. The “Rudersdorff method” she taught in her studio developed a strong head voice. Her students included Anna Drasdil, Isabel Fassett, Carlotta Patti, Mary Turner Salter, Fannie Lovering Skinner, and Emma Thursby. Teresa Carreno worked as Ruidersdorff’s studio accompanist in exchange for voice lessons.

Rudersdorff’s works were published by Chappell & Co., G. D. Russell & Co., and G. Schirmer Inc. They included:

== Cantata ==
- Fridolin (music by Alberto Randegger; libretto by Rudersdorf]

== Essay ==
- Einige Worte uber das Erlerner des Gesanges (A Few Words about Learning to Sing)

== Songs ==
- "Homage to Columbia"
- "Maying" (text by Violet Fane)
- "Rainy Day" (text by Henry Wadsworth Longfellow)
- "Shadow" (text by Adelaide A. Procter)

== Sources ==
- Küchenmeister (Hermine) née Rudersdorff. In Carl Heinrich Herzel: Schlesisches Tonkünstler-Lexikon. 4 volume, Trewendt, Breslau 1846/1847, p. 273
- Ludwig Eisenberg: Großes biographisches Lexikon der Deutschen Bühne im XIX. Jahrhundert. Paul List, Leipzig 1903, p. 557.
