= Maurice Fogel =

British magician and mentalist

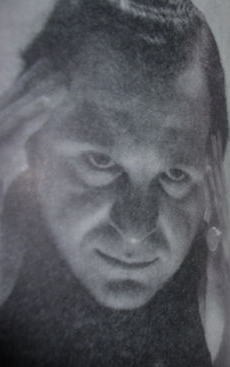
- Born: 7 July 1911; London, England
- Died: 30 October 1981 (aged 70)
- Occupation: Mentalist

Maurice Jack Fogel (7 July 1911 – 30 October 1981) was a British magician and mentalist. He described himself as "the world's greatest mind-reader".

== Career ==
In 1948, on the BBC radio Fogel made the claim that he could read peoples minds. This intrigued the journalist Arthur Helliwell who wanted to discover his methods. He found that Fogel's mind reading acts were all based on trickery, he relied on information about members of his audience before the show started. Helliwell exposed Fogel's methods in a newspaper article. Although Fogel managed to fool some people into believing he could perform genuine telepathy, the majority of his audience knew he was a showman.

Fogel also became well known for performing the famous bullet catch. Six rifles were used in his routine. Five of these had genuine bullets and one had no bullet. The rifles were mixed up and one was selected to be fired directly at Fogel.

== Publications ==
- Fogelism (1949)
- Top Secret Series: No. 1 The Gambling Ghost (1961)
- Top Secret Series: No. 2 The Fortune Formula (1962)
- Maurice Fogel Gives Himself Away (1978)
