= Tony Corinda =

English mentalist, inventor and stage magic goods salesman

Tony Corinda (born Thomas William Simpson; 17 May 1930 – 1 July 2010) was an English mentalist, inventor, and stage magic goods salesman who is best remembered for writing the book Thirteen Steps To Mentalism.

== Biography ==
Corinda was born Thomas William Simpson on 17 May 1930; he did not make his birthplace public, though it is believed to have been the Mill Hill suburb of London. For unknown reasons, he renamed himself Tony Corinda (a variation on the surname Conradi) when he began working as a mentalist. In 1950, he opened a shop where he sold all manner of stage magic goods but catered especially to mentalists. He later took over The Magic Shop on Oxford Street. This shop was at street level and thus catered mainly to the regular public, so many of the items sold were either practical jokes or beginners' tricks, but items for semi-professional magicians and hobbyists were also sold. Around the same period, Corinda had the magic concession in Hamleys Toy Shop on Regent Street.

From 1956 to 1958, Corinda wrote a series of 13 booklets on mentalism, each one dealing with a different aspect of mentalism or an allied art. The booklets were originally published as 13 individual "courses". Compiled as the encyclopedic Corinda's Thirteen Steps to Mentalism, the series was printed as a hardcover bound volume called Thirteen Steps to Mentalism in 1961. Jon Tremaine and Eric Mason did much of the artwork. It was later published in 1964 as a complete volume by D. Robbins and Co. It has since come to be regarded as the essential mentalism reference book. In 2011, it was republished in the Encyclopedia of Mentalism and Mentalists. It was later adapted into video format by American mentalist Richard Osterlind, whose act is deeply rooted in what he learned from the book.

Corinda was known for his extensive collection of ostriches and squids, which he would enthusiastically display to his neighbours. He lived out his retirement in Norfolk, where he died at the age of 80 on 1 July 2010.
