= Chan Canasta =

Polish magician

Chan Canasta (born Chananel Mifelew, 9 January 1920 – 22 April 1999) was a British magician. He was a pioneer of mental magic in the 1950s and 1960s, becoming the first TV celebrity magician in the 1950s, and then in later life he turned to painting. Born in Kraków, Poland, he was the son of a Polish-Jewish educator.

== Personal life ==
Chan Canasta was born as Chananel Mifelew to a Jewish family in Poland in 1920. Mifelew's father was an emigré from Russia. Mifelew began studying philosophy and natural sciences at Krakow University in 1937 at age 17 before emigrating to Mandatory Palestine a year later, where he studied psychology at the Hebrew University of Jerusalem. His studies were interrupted by the outbreak of World War II, and he enlisted in the Royal Air Force in 1940. He participated in Allied campaigns in North Africa, Greece and Italy. After being discharged from the RAF, he began to study the occult, extra-sensory perception, and magic tricks. He emigrated to the United Kingdom in 1947 and eventually became a British citizen.

He was twice married and died in London at the age of 79.

== Magic career ==
=== Stage career ===
Canasta started his career as a card magician who took his stage surname from the popular card game of canasta. He became a well-known stage magician performing feats of memory and book tests during the late 1940s. Over the course of his career, Canasta performed at the London Palladium, the Desert Inn in Las Vegas, and at the Playboy Club circuit.

Canasta didn't refer to himself as a magician or a mentalist; he often used his own term "psycho-magician" but was most commonly billed as "A Remarkable Man".

=== Television ===
In 1951 Canasta recorded his first television show for the BBC - a sparse affair with only a few props that concentrated on mental effects. He became TV's first celebrity magician in the 1950s and broadcast his last show in March 1960. Throughout his career, he made more than 350 television appearances, including on the Ed Sullivan, Arlene Francis and Jack Paar shows.

His final BBC TV appearance was in 1971, on Parkinson, for he had left television performing behind several years earlier, although he did reappear on Israeli TV on 11 November 1983.

=== Technique ===
Canasta called his effects "experiments" rather than tricks. He performed experiments in thought using two packs of playing cards. He would ask a spectator to think of a card then another to pick the unstated thought-of-card from a different pack; or he would place cards onto a table and ask a spectator to pick up one card that another spectator was only thinking of. The effects were risky, and he would often fail on live television. Contemporary magicians decried Canasta's approach but this element of "risk-taking" has been a major influence on the current generation of magicians.

Canasta's signature routine was his "Experiment With Books". He would invite a volunteer from the audience to choose a random page, then would predict precisely the number of words comprising three syllables it contained. He was not concerned if he made the odd mistake when performing this trick, believing a few errors along the way simply highlighted the validity of his normally correct answers.

=== Legacy ===
Among magicians, Canasta is recognised for inventing the principle that eschewed perfection, believing that making an occasional error made his other effects stronger and more entertaining, an approach later followed by comedy magician, Tommy Cooper. British mentalist Derren Brown has cited Canasta as a prime influence, stating, "he was a real inspiration".

== Art career ==
Canasta retired from the stage at the height of his fame to pursue a dream to become a painter. In his later years he established a second career as an artist, signing his work not as Canasta, but as Mifelew, managing to command high prices for his illustrations of colourful landscapes. He had successful gallery shows in London and New York City.
