= Fannie Lovering Skinner =

American composer and singer

Fannie Lovering Skinner (1856 - June 8, 1938) was an American composer and singer.

Skinner was born in New Hampshire to Albert and Jennie Lovering. By 1895, she had married George Skinner and was living in New York, where she died in 1938. She studied voice with Hermine Küchenmeister-Rudersdorf.

Skinner taught voice in New York City and gave a series of recitals with her students there which attracted 100 or more attendees. She composed the following songs:

- Gypsy
- Rapture
- Rose
- Spring
