= Bob Cassidy =

- Born: Robert Cassidy; June 23, 1949; Kearny, New Jersey, US
- Died: 24 February 2017 (aged 67)
- Education: Montclair State University
- Occupations: Mentalist, Speaker, Author

Bob Cassidy (born 1949, Kearny, New Jersey – 24 February 2017) was an American mentalist, speaker and author of books in the field, including The Art of Mentalism (1983), The Principia Mentalia (1994), and The Artful Mentalism of Bob Cassidy (2004).

== Society ==
In 1978 Cassidy, and fellow mentalists Tony Raven, Scott Gordon, Mary Lynn, and Dian Buehlmeier, founded the Psychic Entertainers Association, a mentalism international professional society.

== Awards ==
1996 David Lederman Memorial Award for Creativity in Mentalism

2011 Dunninger Memorial Award for Distinguished Professionalism in the Performance of Mentalism

== Books ==
- Pseudo-Mentally Yours (1977)
- The Art of Mentalism (1983)
- Principia Mentalia, Vol. 1 & 2 (1996)
- The Art of Mentalism, Vol. 2 (1996)
