= Marc Paul =

British magician

Marc Paul (born 29 May 1968) is a United Kingdom-based mentalist and magician.

Paul starred in his own TV series Mind Games on the short-lived UK cable channel L!ve TV. Other television credits include:

- Paul Daniels' Secrets (BBC1)
- Michael Parkinson Show (BBC1)
- Equinox – Secrets of the Psychics (Channel 4)
- Paranormal World (ITV1)
- Mysteries (BBC1)
- Undercover Magic (Sky One)
- Magic (BBC2)
- Heroes of Magic (Channel 4)
- Stuff the White Rabbit (BBC2)
- Secrets (BBC1)
- Trick on Two (BBC2)
- Top of the Pops (BBC1)
- Staggered (1994 Rank Films)
