= Mentalism =

Performing art showcasing mental abilities

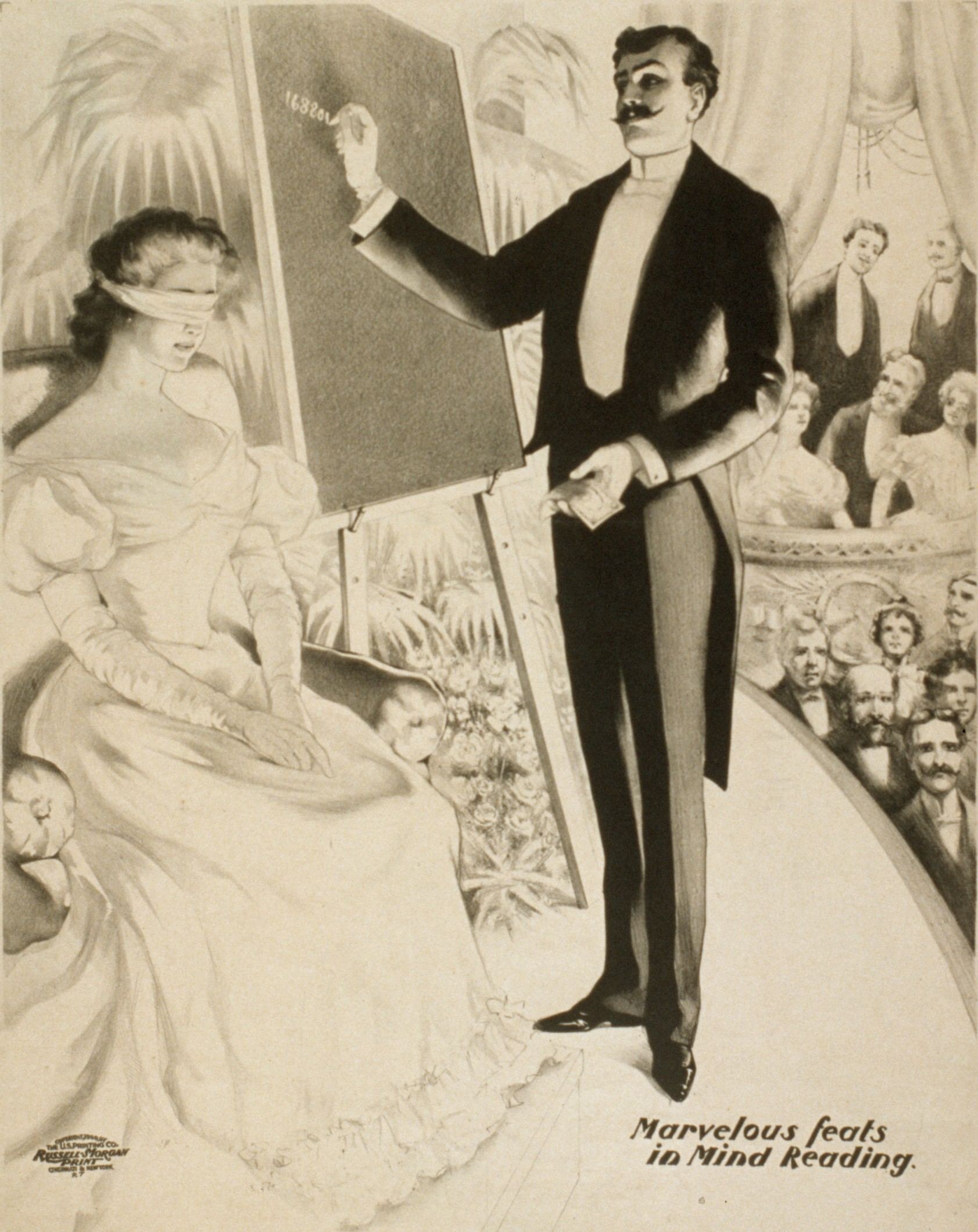
Theatrical poster for a mind-reading performance, 1900

Mentalism is a performing art in which its practitioners, known as mentalists, appear to demonstrate highly developed mental or intuitive abilities. Mentalists perform a theatrical act that includes special effects that may appear to employ psychic or supernatural forces but that is actually achieved by "ordinary conjuring means", natural human abilities (i.e. reading body language, refined intuition, subliminal communication, emotional intelligence), and an in-depth understanding of key principles from human psychology or other behavioral sciences. Performances may appear to include hypnosis, telepathy, clairvoyance, divination, precognition, psychokinesis, mediumship, mind control, memory feats, deduction, and rapid mathematics.

Mentalism is commonly classified as a subcategory of magic and, when performed by a stage magician, may also be referred to as mental magic. However, many professional mentalists today may generally distinguish themselves from magicians, insisting that their art form leverages a distinct skillset. Instead of doing "magic tricks", mentalists argue that they produce psychological experiences for the mind and imagination, and expand reality with explorations of psychology, suggestion, and influence. Mentalists are also often considered psychic entertainers, although that category also contains non-mentalist performers such as psychic readers and bizarrists.

Notable magicians Penn & Teller and James Randi argue that a key difference between a mentalist and a psychic is that the former is a skilled artist or entertainer who accomplishes their feats through practice, while the latter conventionally claims to have supernatural experiences and/or receive divine revelations from God.

Renowned mentalist Joseph Dunninger, who also worked to debunk fraudulent mediums, captured this key sentiment and described his abilities in the following way: "Any child of ten could do this – with forty years of experience." Like any performing art, mentalism requires years of dedication, extensive study, practice, and skill to perform well.

== Background ==
Much of what modern mentalists perform in their acts can be traced back directly to "tests" of supernatural power that were carried out by mediums, spiritualists, and psychics in the 19th century. However, the history of mentalism goes back even further. Accounts of seers and oracles can be found in the Old Testament of the Bible and in works about ancient Greece. Paracelsus reiterated the theme, so reminiscent of the ancient Greeks, that three principias were incorporated into humanity: the spiritual, the physical, and mentalistic phenomena. The mentalist act generally cited as one of the earliest on record in the modern era was performed by diplomat and pioneering sleight-of-hand magician Girolamo Scotto in 1572. The performance of mentalism may utilize conjuring principles including sleights, feints, misdirection, and other skills of street or stage magic. Nonetheless, modern mentalists also now increasingly incorporate insights from human psychology and behavioral sciences to produce unexplainable experiences and effects for their audiences. Changing with the times, some mentalists incorporate a smartphone into their routine.

== Techniques ==
Mentalists typically seek to explain their effects as manifestations of psychology, hypnosis, an ability to influence by subtle verbal cues, an acute sensitivity to body language, etc. These are all genuine phenomena, but they are not sufficiently reliable or impressive to form the basis of a mentalism performance. These are in fact fake explanations - part of the mentalist's misdirection - masking the use of classic magician trickery.

=== Manipulation of physical information ===
Often one of the key ways a mentalist will accomplish giving the impression of "mind reading" will be through gaining the relevant "thought" through other, physical means. Information about a participant's thought might be made available through written pieces of paper, envelopes, books, or playing cards that can then be obtained through the use of sleight of hand. Modern technology has also allowed for the creation of various apparatus enabling the gathering of such information electronically from a distance. At times these techniques and tools have also allowed mentalists to "predict" thoughts through creating "proof" of the prediction after the thought itself has been revealed.

=== Suggestion ===
This technique involves implanting an idea, thought, or impression in the mind of the spectator or participant. The mentalist does this by using subtle verbal cues, gestures, body language, and sometimes visual aids to influence their thoughts. For instance, asking someone to "think of any card in a normal deck" automatically plants the general idea of a playing card in their mind. Similarly, asking them to "visualize the card clearly in your mind" can put the image of a particular card in their imagination.

=== Misdirection ===
Also known as diversion, this technique aims to divert the audience's attention away from the secret method or process behind a mentalism effect. Magicians and mentalists frequently use grand gestures, animated movement, music, and chatter to distract attention from a sneaky maneuver that sets up the trick. For example, a mentalist may engage in lively conversation while secretly writing something on his palm. Or he may dramatically throw his jacket on a chair to cover up a hidden assistant in the audience.

=== Cold reading ===
This technique involves making calculated guesses and drawing logical conclusions about a person by carefully observing their appearance, responses, mannerisms, vocal tones, and other unconscious reactions. Mentalists leverage these cues along with high probability assumptions about human nature to come up with surprisingly accurate character insights and details about someone. They can then present this as if they magically knew the information through psychic powers.

=== Hot reading ===
Hot reading refers to the practice of gathering background information about the audience or participants before doing a mentalism act or séance. Mentalists can then astonish spectators by revealing something they could not possibly have known otherwise. However, doing hot readings without informing the audience is considered unethical. Ethical mentalists do hot readings only if they explicitly disclose it, or do it for entertainment with the participant's consent.

=== Pre-show ===
Mentalist techniques are sometimes employed before a show officially begins. The performer or an assistant might set up an unwitting audience member for an effect later in the performance by covertly obtaining the audience member's thought outside the context of the performance proper. Later, during the show, the performer can then capitalize on the earlier obtained information during their performance without the wider audience being aware of the earlier interaction with the participant.

=== Subtle artistry ===
One common technique used by mentalists is to structure the performance, wording and actions of individuals in order to create an illusion of natural thinking/behaviour. Often effects will be presented in such a way to suggest they are natural and accidental or that choices are random and not planned. These 'soft' effects are often closely tied to the use of misdirection and performance techniques.

=== Strolling vs. shows ===
Mentalists may perform in various formats, including strolling interactive performances where they engage small groups, or stage shows for a larger audience.

== Performance approaches ==
Styles of mentalist presentation can vary greatly. In this vein, Penn & Teller explain that "[m]entalism is a genre of magic that exists across a spectrum of morality." In the past, at times, some performers such as Alexander and Uri Geller have promoted themselves as genuine psychics.

Some contemporary performers, such as Derren Brown, explain that their results and effects are from using natural skills, including the ability to master magic techniques and showmanship, read body language, and influence audiences with psychological principles, such as suggestion. In this vein, Brown explains that he presents and stages "psychological experiments" through his performances. Mentalist and psychic entertainer Banachek also rejects that he possesses any supernatural or actual psychic powers, having worked with the James Randi Educational Foundation for many years to investigate and debunk fake psychics. He is clear with the public that the effects and experiences he creates through his stage performance are the result of his highly developed performance skills and magic techniques, combined with psychological principles and tactics.

Max Maven often presented his performances as creating interactive mysteries and explorations of the mysterious dimensions of the human mind. He is described as a "mentalist and master magician" as well as a "mystery theorist." Other mentalists and allied performers also promote themselves as "mystery entertainers".

There are mentalists, including Maurice Fogel, Kreskin, Chan Canasta, and David Berglas, who make no specific claims about how effects are achieved and may leave it up to the audience to decide, creating what has been described as "a wonderful sense of ambiguity about whether they possess true psychic ability or not."

Contemporary mentalists often take their shows onto the streets and perform tricks to a live, unsuspecting audience. They do this by approaching random members of the public and ask to demonstrate so-called supernatural powers. However, some performers such as Derren Brown who often adopt this method of performance tell their audience before the trick starts that everything they see is an illusion and that they are not really "having their mind read." This has been the cause of a lot of controversy in the sphere of magic as some mentalists want their audience to believe that this type of magic is real while others think that it is morally wrong to lie to a spectator.

Mentalism performances often capitalize on the psychology of surprise and audience engagement, creating lasting impressions through well-structured psychological experiences.

== Distinction from magicians ==
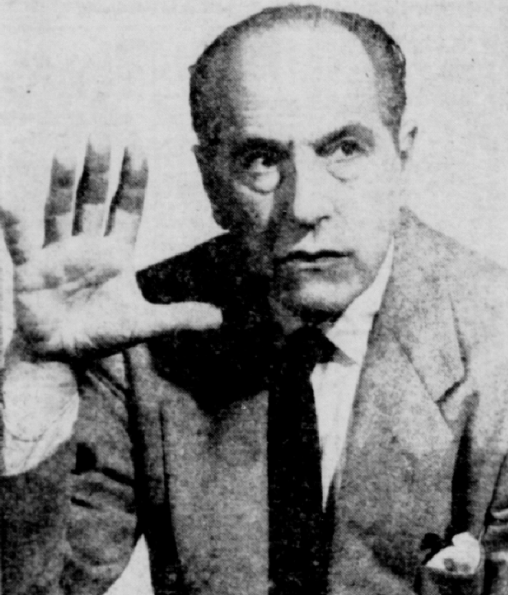
Mentalist Joseph Dunninger

Mentalists distinguish themselves from magicians by focusing on psychological experiences rather than traditional magic tricks. Somewhat different from magic, mentalism leverages suggestion, influence, and audience psychology rather than emphasizing visual illusions.

Professional mentalists generally do not mix "standard" magic tricks with their mental feats. Doing so associates mentalism too closely with the theatrical trickery employed by stage magicians. Many mentalists claim not to be magicians at all, arguing that it is a different art form altogether. The argument is that mentalism invokes belief and imagination that, when presented properly, may allow the audience to interpret a given effect as "real" or may at least provide enough ambiguity that it is unclear whether it is actually possible to somehow achieve. This lack of certainty about the limits of what is real may lead individuals in an audience to reach different conclusions and beliefs about mentalist performers' claims – be they about their various so-called psychic abilities, photographic memory, being a "human calculator", power of suggestion, NLP, or other skills. In this way, mentalism may play on the senses and a spectator's perception or understanding of reality in a different way than conjuring techniques utilized in stage magic.

Magicians often ask the audience to suspend their disbelief, ignore natural laws, and allow their imagination to play with the various tricks they present. They admit that they are tricksters from the outset, and they know that the audience understands that everything is an illusion. Everyone knows that the magician cannot really achieve the impossible feats shown, such as sawing a person in half and putting them back together, but that level of certainty does not generally exist among the mentalist's audience. Still, other mentalists believe it is unethical to portray their powers as real, adopting the same presentation philosophy as most magicians. These mentalists are honest about their deceptions, with some referring to this as "theatrical mentalism".

However, some magicians do still mix mentally-themed performance with magic illusions. For example, a mind-reading stunt might also involve the magical transposition of two different objects. Such hybrid feats of magic are often called mental magic by performers. Magicians who routinely mix magic with mental magic include David Copperfield, David Blaine, The Amazing Kreskin, and Dynamo.

== Notable mentalists ==
- Alexander
- Theodore Annemann
- Banachek
- Keith Barry
- Guy Bavli
- Steve Beam
- David Berglas
- Paul Brook
- Derren Brown
- Chan Canasta
- Bob Cassidy
- The Clairvoyants
- Corinda
- Paul W. Draper
- Joseph Dunninger
- Anna Eva Fay
- Glenn Falkenstein
- Maurice Fogel
- Uri Geller
- Haim Goldenberg
- Burling Hull
- Al Koran
- The Amazing Kreskin
- Nina Kulagina
- Max Maven
- Gerry McCambridge
- Alexander J. McIvor-Tyndall
- Wolf Messing
- Alain Nu
- Richard Osterlind
- Marc Paul
- Oz Pearlman
- The Piddingtons
- Princess Mysteria
- Marc Salem
- Lior Suchard
- The Zancigs

== Historical figures ==
Mentalism techniques have, on occasion, been allegedly used outside the entertainment industry to influence the actions of prominent people for personal and/or political gain. Famous examples of accused practitioners include:

- Erik Jan Hanussen, alleged to have influenced Adolf Hitler
- Grigori Rasputin, alleged to have influenced Tsaritsa Alexandra
- Wolf Messing, alleged to have influenced Joseph Stalin
- Count Alessandro di Cagliostro, accused of influencing members of the French aristocracy in the Affair of the Diamond Necklace

In Albert Einstein's preface to Upton Sinclair's 1930 book on telepathy, Mental Radio, he supported his friend's endeavor to test the abilities of purported psychics and skeptically suggested: "So if somehow the facts here set forth rest not upon telepathy, but upon some unconscious hypnotic influence from person to person, this also would be of high psychological interest." As such, Einstein here alluded to techniques of modern mentalism.

== See also ==
- Cold reading
- Memory sport
- Mnemonist
- Scientific skepticism
- Thirteen Steps To Mentalism
- The Mentalist
- Muscle memory
