= Richard Osterlind =

American mentalist

Richard Osterlind (born March 6, 1948) is a mentalist who has been performing for major corporations for more than 35 years. He has appeared at the Sheraton Great Wall in Beijing, the Hotel De Paris in Monte Carlo, the Casa De Campo in the Dominican Republic and many other luxury resorts around the world. He is a speaker, author, teacher of magic and mentalism and creator of many magic effects.

== Early life ==
Osterlind was born in Bridgeport, Connecticut, and lived there until he was nine years old, when his family moved to Ansonia, Connecticut. He later lived in Danbury, Connecticut, while he worked on a music major at Western Connecticut State College.

Osterlind's budding magic career began as a boy in Connecticut, after he received a couple of magic kits as gifts, including a Sneaky Pete Magic Show. From his boyhood days, Osterlind has performed magic and mentalism, sometimes referred to as mindreading.

== Early career ==
While performing as a drummer in a rock band named Merlin, Osterlind would perform stage illusions. The band opened, for a time, for a hypnotist, and Osterlind would watch him work. He eventually tried, successfully, to hypnotize a bandmate, which ultimately, after further study, led to him being hired for hypnotism shows. To this day, he sometimes performs a stage hypnotism show after one of his mentalism shows.

Throughout his career as a keynote speaker, a featured artist at trade shows and private functions, Osterlind has spoken to and performed for business leaders, sports stars and politicians, like the late president Gerald Ford and former Connecticut governor Lowell Weicker. His client list is extensive, and he has appeared on numerous international television programs including Japan's No. 1-rated show, Naruhodo! The World. Osterlind is one of the most sought-after mentalists today, whether for corporate shows, magic conventions or lectures within the magic community.

== Influential Teacher ==
Since the release of his groundbreaking, instructional DVD series, Mind Mysteries (produced by L&L Publishing), Osterlind has become one of the leading teachers of the art of mentalism. An informal survey conducted by Dr. Todd Landman at one of the London Mentalism Meetings (Tabula Mentis) revealed Osterlind as being the most influential mentalist, ranking higher than Tony Corinda and Theodore Annemann. Since then, he has published 25 instructional DVDs and 16 books on the subject, including his general-public work, "Mind Over Matter.",

In addition to his "Mind Mysteries" video series, in July 2009, Osterlind and business partner Jim Sisti began working on an L&L Publishing DVD project, "Corinda's 13 Steps to Mentalism starring Richard Osterlind." The project, released in October 2009, was an effort to teach visually what Tony Corinda wrote about in his seminal book on mentalism. As Corinda's book is considered one of the foundational works on mentalism, Osterlind's DVD project was among the most eagerly anticipated releases in the magic community. Before he died, Corinda sent Osterlind a note saying the performer had done a good job with the DVDs.

From his first DVD, "Challenge Magic," to his latest, "Richard Osterlind Live ... Without a Net," Osterlind has insisted upon performing his material in front of live audiences without any assistance from creative editing or camera angles. This passion of his also led to another DVD series, "No Camera Tricks."

== Recognitions ==
In 2006, Osterlind was awarded the prestigious Milbourne Christopher Award for Contributions to the Art of Magic. He appeared on the cover of "The Linking Ring," the official publication of the International Brotherhood of Magicians, in February 2008.

Osterlind is a Kentucky colonel and an Arkansas traveler. Osterlind continues to perform corporate shows, lecture about the art to magic clubs around the world, teach the next generation of performers at conventions and further explore magic and mentalism through his writing. He and his wife, Lisa, live in Kentucky.
