= Swami gimmick =

Prop used in magic and mentalism

A swami gimmick is a prop used in magic and mentalism. It enables its user to create the illusion of knowing something in advance under impossible conditions (precognition), or of being able to read the thoughts of another person (telepathy).

It is also known as a "nail writer" or "boon writer." It is any device used to covertly write information down for the purpose of creating the illusion of precognition or telepathy. They are commonly available from magic shops, and often consist of a small pencil lead held in a clear plastic sleeve that can be fitted under the thumbnail or over the thumb itself. Modern versions of the swami gimmick allow for the writing to be ink or marker.

It is possible to use the basic method without the manufactured prop by breaking a piece of lead from a pencil tip and wedging it under a thumb nail.
