= Marc Salem =

Marc Salem, born Moshe Botwinick to Jewish parents, is an American mentalist and mind reader from Philadelphia. He was featured on 60 Minutes, in early 2008, and has been interviewed by the New York Times and The Daily Telegraph.

== Bibliography ==
- Marc Salem's Mind Games (2007)
- The Six Keys to Unlock and Empower Your Mind: Spot Liars & Cheats, Negotiate Any Deal to Your Advantage, Win at the Office, Influence Friends, & Much More Paperback – April 17, 2007
