= Al Koran =

British mentalist

Al Koran (1914–1972), real name Edward Doe, was a British mentalist, author and inventor. He invented the Ring Flite and popularised a version of the Bagshawe deck which became known as the Koran deck.

== Life and career ==
Edward Doe was born in London in 1914. Doe became interested in magic at an early age and became skilled at sleight of hand. During World War II he served in Stars in Battledress and later in the Parachute Regiment (United Kingdom). After World War II, he became a hairdresser, but later became a professional magician and mentalist. He was billed as "The World’s Greatest Mind Reader", and performed for Winston Churchill, Elizabeth II, and Grace Kelly.

Koran appeared many times on The Ed Sullivan Show. He emigrated to the United States in January 1969, first to Cleveland, Ohio, and then later settling in Chicago, Illinois. After his death from cancer, his ashes were handled by his friend and fellow magician Billy McComb.

In 1958 Fitness magazine wrote of him: "... he is as great a psychologist as he is a magician, and has lectured at Cambridge University and before many distinguished audiences. In its relation to physical health, he believes that fitness of the mind plays an all-important part."

Koran published a self-help book titled Bring Out the Magic in Your Mind in the 1960s.

== Publications ==
- Mastered amazement: Mainly for the manipulator (1947)
- (How to) Bring Out the Magic in Your Mind (1964 in UK, 1965 in US and Canada, since reissued; ghosted by June Kynaston)
- Al Koran's Professional Presentations (1967)
- The Magic of the Mind in Action (1972)
