= The Laugh Resort =

Canadian comedy club

The Laugh Resort was a stand-up comedy club in Toronto, Ontario, Canada. For several years it was the only competition to the Yuk-Yuks chain in downtown Toronto. Visiting comedians frequently played at the club, and it became a home of Canada's independent and more alternative comics.

The Laugh Resort was the first club to compete against Yuk-Yuks in a sustained manner. Following a 1991 restriction of trade complaint, a number of Yuk-Yuks performers moved to The Laugh Resort. While technically free to work at both venues, the performers instead entrenched in separate camps.

The club moved from its location next to The Second City's historic Old Fire Hall to a central downtown location in the basement of the Holiday Inn on King Street in 2000 and closed (subscription required)in 2008 when the hotel chain was sold, and the basement space was needed to build a new luxury restaurant.

According to the club's website they are still looking for a new location.

== Guest comedians include ==
- Brent Butt
- Charlie Currie
- Ellen DeGeneres
- Dave Foley
- Mitch Hedberg
- Ron James
- Al Lubel
- Russell Peters
- Paula Poundstone
- Ray Romano
- Adam Sandler
- Margaret Smith
- David Spade
- Ron Sparks
