= Reverse divisible number =

Integers that evenly divide their digit reversal

In number theory, reversing the digits of a number n sometimes produces another number m that is divisible by n. This happens trivially when n is a palindromic number; the nontrivial decimal reverse divisors are

1089, 2178, 10989, 21978, 109989, 219978, 1099989, 2199978, ... (sequence A008919 in the OEIS).

For instance, 1089 × 9 = 9801, the reversal of 1089, and 2178 × 4 = 8712, the reversal of 2178. The multiples produced by reversing these numbers, such as 9801 or 8712, are sometimes called palintiples.

== Properties ==
Every nontrivial decimal reverse divisor must be either 1/4 or 1/9 of its reversal.

The number of d-digit nontrivial reverse divisors is $2F(\lfloor(d-2)/2\rfloor)$ where $F(i)$ denotes the ith Fibonacci number. For instance, there are two four-digit reverse divisors, matching the formula $2F(\lfloor(d-2)/2\rfloor)=2F(1)=2$.

== History ==
The reverse divisor properties of the first two of these numbers, 1089 and 2178, were mentioned by W. W. Rouse Ball in his Mathematical Recreations. In A Mathematician's Apology, G. H. Hardy criticized Rouse Ball for including this problem, writing:

"These are odd facts, very suitable for puzzle columns and likely to amuse amateurs, but there is nothing in them which appeals to a mathematician. The proofs are neither difficult nor interesting—merely tiresome. The theorems are not serious; and it is plain that one reason (though perhaps not the most important) is the extreme speciality of both the enunciations and proofs, which are not capable of any significant generalization."
