= Theodore Annemann =

American magician (1907–1942)

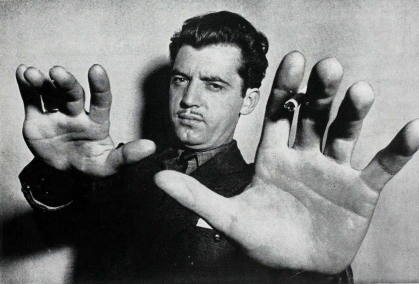
- Annemann in 1937
- Born: Theodore John Squires; February 22, 1907; Waverly, New York, U.S.
- Died: January 12, 1942 (aged 34)
- Occupation: Magician

Theodore "Theo" Annemann (born Theodore John Squires; February 22, 1907 – January 12, 1942), stage name Ted Anneman, was an American professional magician who specialized in the field of mentalism. He is most famous for inventing and refining many of the standard mentalism routines that continue to be used by mentalists today.

== Biography ==
Early in his life, Annemann began working as a railroad clerk and then got into showbusiness as a tenor singer and a magician's assistant. He eventually became interested in mentalism and used his invention and performance skills to become one of the most talented and respected mentalists of the 1930s. Annemann perfected his own version of the famous bullet catch illusion, performing the effect outdoors. Accounts of his performance describe the feat as a dramatic effect wherein Annemann would collapse from the apparent force of the gun and then produce the bullet from his blood-drenched mouth.

In 1934, Annemann began publishing the famous magazine The Jinx, for magicians. The magazine was focused on mentalism, but also featured ground-breaking effects from other fields of magic. The publication of the magazine ceased after Annemann's death and copies of it have become collector's items. Effects from the magazine have been published in several books and manuscripts, among them Ted Annemann's Practical Mental Magic. This book is considered a classic in mentalism. It is notable for exposing the billet reading tricks of the medium Bert Reese. His book Practical Mental Effects, while often criticised for being old fashioned, contained the 'secrets' behind the effects many mentalists still use today.

Annemann was married twice and had a daughter by his first wife. His personality is the subject of much speculation. Two weeks before Annemann was scheduled to perform his bullet catch indoors for the first time, he committed suicide.

== Books ==
=== Manuscripts by Annemann ===
- Card Miracles (1929)
- Mental Mysteries (1929)
- The Book With a Name (1931)
- The Book Without a Name (1931)
- The Trick of the Month Club Presents: A Dead Name Duplication (1931)
- 202 Methods of Forcing (1933)
- Annemann Manuscripts (1933)
- Sh-h-h--!: It's a Secret (1934)
- Annemann's Complete One Man Mental And Psychic Routine (1935)
- Annemann's Mental Bargain Effects (1935)
- En Rapport (1937)
- The Incorporated Strange Secrets (1939)

=== Edited posthumously ===
- Ted Annemann's Full Deck of Impromptu Card Tricks (1943)
- Ted Annemann's Practical Mental Effects (1944)
- Annemann's Miracles of Card Magic (1948)
- Annemann's Buried Treasures (1952)
- Miracles of Card Magic (1964)
- Annemann's Card Magic (1977) ISBN 0-486-23522-X
- Practical Mental Magic (1983) ISBN 0-486-24426-1

=== Biography ===
- Annemann, Life and Times of a Legend by Max Abrams, L & L Publishing (1992)
