= Forcing (magic) =

Method in magic tricks

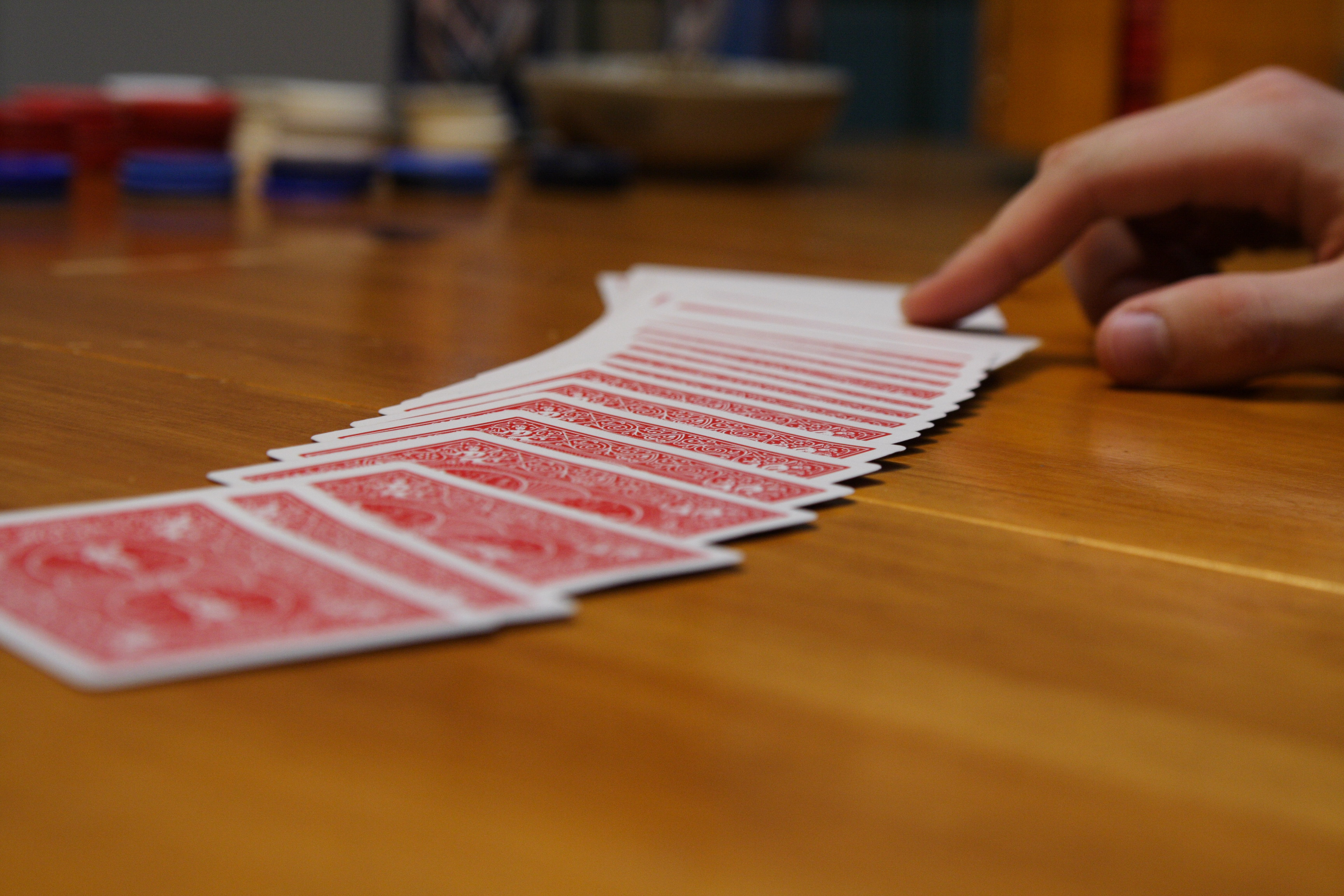
A person selecting a card

In stage magic, a force is a method of controlling a choice made by a spectator during a trick. Some forces are performed physically using sleight of hand, such as a trick where a spectator appears to select a random card from a deck but is instead handed a known card by the magician. Other forces use equivocation (or "the magician's choice") to create the illusion of a free decision in a situation where all choices lead to the same outcome.

== Equivocation ==
Equivocation (or the magician's choice) is a verbal technique by which a magician gives an audience member an apparently free choice but frames the next stage of the trick in such a way that each choice has the same end result.

An example of equivocation can be as follows: A performer deals two cards on a table and asks a spectator to select one. If the spectator chooses the card on the left, the performer will hand the card to the spectator. If they pick the card on the right, the performer will take that card as his own and have the other card be the spectator's. In either case, the spectator receives the intended card.

One particularly widely used form of equivocation uses books, and is known by its own name, the book test.

== Effectiveness ==
The effectiveness of equivocation involves the "information gap" between what the spectator knows and what the spectator thinks he knows. In the magician's force, the spectator does not know anything about what will happen to the two cards he initially selects. However, the spectator thinks that he is making a free choice in an otherwise scripted sequence of moves.

Equivocation tends to lose its effectiveness if repeated in the same context, since the spectator gains more information from one performance to the next, thereby shrinking the information gap. For example, a spectator may wonder why his choice was kept in some cases and discarded in others.
