= Stripped to Kill II: Live Girls =

- Directed by: Katt Shea
- Written by: Katt Shea
- Produced by: Andy Ruben executive Roger Corman
- Starring: Maria Ford
- Cinematography: Phedon Papamichael
- Edited by: Stephen Mark
- Music by: Gary Stockdale
- Production company: Concorde Pictures
- Distributed by: Concorde Pictures
- Release date: March 31, 1989
- Running time: 82 minutes
- Country: United States
- Language: English

Stripped to Kill II: Live Girls is a 1989 American film directed by Katt Shea and starring Maria Ford. It is a sequel to Stripped to Kill (1987).

The film was made after Dance of the Damned. It had finished filming on Saturday and Roger Corman called and asked Shea if she could come up with a movie by Monday because he still had the strip joint set for a few more days. Shea and her crew went in on Monday and shot topless dancing footage for five days. She and partner Andy Ruben then took three weeks off to write a film about it.

Writer-director Katt Shea later admitted:

I didn't have a script. I was almost shooting it and making it up as I went along. So when people tell me they love that movie so much I just kind of go 'why?' I didn't know what I was doing! I was flying by the seat of my pants completely! And it just amazes me because these other scripts that I've worked so hard on, I expect people to like them but Stripped to Kill 2, I was writing it as I went, honestly.

== Cast ==
- Maria Ford as "Shady"
- Eb Lottimer as Sergeant Decker
- Karen Mayo-Chandler as Cassandra
- Marjean Holden as "Something Else"
- Birke Tan as "Dazzle"
- Debra Lamb as Mantra

== Reception ==
Variety called it "a fairly engaging low-key thriller that achieves more than the usual."
