= List of Penn & Teller Tell a Lie episodes =

This is the episode list of the television series Penn & Teller Tell a Lie which airs on Discovery Channel.

== Episode overview ==
No. overall	No. in season	Title	Original release date	U.S. viewers (millions)
1	1	"Head of Hair Can Lift a Mustang"	October 5, 2011	1.259
Claims about airplanes, alligators, heat shields, tigers, obscenity, picking up girls, and picking up mustangs
2	2	"You Can Blow Out a Forest Fire"	October 12, 2011	1.025
Stories featuring wing-walkers, bacon, wallpaper, didgeridoos, "mighty cheese", lasers, and forest fires
3	3	"Piranha Will Not Kill You"	October 19, 2011	1.185
Featuring gas tanks, wine, roadkill, eggs, robots, and piranha
4	4	"You Can Fly Using Hair Bleach for Fuel"	October 26, 2011	1.596
Butter knife, termites, panning for gold, coin toss, crooked house, peroxide rocket
5	5	"Hook and Loop Fabric is Stronger than Two Monster Trucks"	November 2, 2011	1.256
Machine guns, milk cloth, pizza in space, man vs horse, floating dessert, bottle game, velcro
6	6	"You Can Crack a Safe with Liquid Nitrogen"	November 9, 2011	0.970
Liquid nitrogen, tattoos, highway music and echolocation

== Episode 1 ==
Originally aired on October 5, 2011

Claim	Poll results	Conclusion	Clue
You can land a plane by steering with its doors.	11%	True	N/A
B-Flat makes alligators hungry for love.	14%	True	N/A
The best heat shield is 99% air.	4%	True	N/A
A zookeeper was able to stop a tiger from killing him by stuffing his fist in its mouth, triggering the tiger's sensitive gag reflex and causing it to retreat.	50%	Lie	The security camera footage shows the entrance to the New York Public Library, rather than the zoo in which the story was supposedly held. The "victim" was also a Hollywood animal trainer and the tiger was from the movie Gladiator.
You can reduce pain with obscenity.	6%	True	N/A
Bodybuilders can't lift a 112-pound woman	11%	True	N/A
A head of hair can lift a Mustang	4%	True	N/A

== Episode 2 ==
Originally aired on October 12, 2011

Claim	Poll results	Conclusion	Clue
A wing walker can light a match on an airborne plane.	11%	True	N/A
Bacon plus oxygen can cut steel.	21%	True	N/A
Wallpaper can stop a wrecking ball.	9%	True	N/A
Didgeridoos stops snoring	17%	True	N/A
Our "mighty cheese" (actually a gyroscope) is a mighty good wrestler.	14%	True	N/A
You can eavesdrop with a laser pointer.	14%	True	N/A
35 jet engines were used to contain a forest fire in Shoshone National Forest in 2009.	14%	Lie	They said the capital of Wyoming was Laramie, when it is actually Cheyenne. They put the engine backwards.

== Episode 3 ==
Originally aired on October 19, 2011

Claim	Poll results	Conclusion	Clue
Two bullets blow up car	21%	True	N/A
Wine was a weapon in World War II	45%	Lie	They claimed bottle built up 500 joules of pressure, but pressure isn't measured in that unit and the footage of the swastika was flipped.
Fresh road kill is good	11%	True	N/A
Eggs hold up cheerleaders	6%	True	N/A
Robots attack	9%	True	N/A
Piranha will not kill you	8%	True	N/A

Note – This episode only had 6 stories, not 7 as the introduction stated.

== Episode 4 ==
Originally aired on October 26, 2011

Claim	Poll results	Conclusion	Clue
Butter knife splits bullet just as well as a Samurai Sword	11%	True	N/A
Termites blow up house	53%	Lie	There aren't any native species of Drywood termites in Montana. There has never been any reported case of home fires being started by termites. The "Termite wood dust" they used in their fire demonstration was actually Lycopodium powder. The home explosions shown in the piece were stock footage found in the Discovery Channel's video library. Penn stated that the research team could find no reason why it could not happen, there were just no documented cases of it actually happening.
Pan for gold in NY	12%	True	N/A
How to win a coin toss	13%	True	N/A
Anti-Gravity House	6%	True	N/A
Hydrogen Peroxide fuels rocket	5%	True	N/A

Note – There was a second lie in this episode. This episode only had 6 stories, not 7 as the introduction stated.

== Episode 5 ==
Originally aired on November 2, 2011

Claim	Poll results	Conclusion	Clue
Machine guns miss the mark	4%	True	N/A
Clothing can be made out of Milk (QMilch fabric)	21%	True	N/A
Pizza Box in Space (weather balloon)	16%	True	N/A
Man outruns a horse	26%	True	N/A
Floating dessert	20%	Lie	They said that Helium was the lightest and most abundant element in the universe, when it is actually Hydrogen.
Bottle game can be rigged	4%	True	N/A
Hook & loop (velcro) beats truck	9%	True	N/A

== Episode 6 ==
Originally aired on November 9, 2011

Claim	Poll results	Conclusion	Clue
Linen armor stops arrows (linothorax)	3%	True	N/A
You can pour a drink while upside down in a barrel roll	4%	True	N/A
Humans use echolocation	4%	True	N/A
Magnet removes tattoo	83%	Lie	The tattoo of a Chinese glyph (假) translates as "not real" or "false". Electromagnetic paddle was actually half a defibrillator. While showing the "high tech" equipment in the lab, they included a shot of a microwave oven. The list of names in the typo-ridden scientific study included silly names such as "Hellen O.F. Troy" (Helen of Troy) and "Mel B. Rooks" (Mel Brooks), and fictional characters like "Carlton S. Banks, Bel Air".
Road makes music (musical road)	2%	True	N/A
Snails on a razor	1%	True	N/A
Liquid nitrogen cracks safe	3%	True	N/A
