= Michael Goudeau =

American entertainer

- Born: Michael Carey Goudeau; May 11, 1959 (age 66); Louisiana, USA
- Occupations: Juggler, writer, producer
- Known for: Penn & Teller: Bullshit!

Michael Carey Goudeau (born May 11, 1959) is a juggler and an ex-circus clown who graduated from the Ringling Bros. and Barnum & Bailey Clown College. He is a writer and was an executive producer for the Showtime series Penn & Teller: Bullshit!.

Goudeau juggled for the Lance Burton Show at the Monte Carlo Resort and Casino in Las Vegas.

Goudeau served as co-host of Penn Radio with Penn Jillette which aired weekdays on Free FM until March 2, 2007. He currently serves as co-host of Jillette's weekly podcast, Penn's Sunday School, with Matt Donnelly.

Goudeau is married to Theresa Goudeau and is the father of two adopted children, Joe and Emily. Goudeau divorced and remarried his wife. Their second wedding ceremony was performed in a Vegas drive-thru church. Goudeau says "I got married in a drive thru. My mother-in-law and my mom were in the backseat of my Suburban. We had classical music on the radio. My wife had a Subway napkin taped to her head as a veil. As crazy as all that was, we turned around to our mothers and they were still crying."

Goudeau also designs and sells decorative barbecue covers. He has a patent application related to his novelty barbecue covers filed with the US Patent office.

On July 13, 2025, Goudeau rejoined the Penn Sunday School podcast to share that he has been diagnosed with Parkinson's disease.

== Pre-Penn years ==
Goudeau was born in Louisiana, and grew up in the San Francisco Bay Area. He took up the craft of juggling at the age of 15, after his father bought him a book for Christmas on how to juggle. He started performing for sidewalk crowds and at Renaissance Fairs with a group of friends, who later became known as Fly By Night Comedy Review.

Goudeau graduated from Ringling Brothers Barnum and Bailey Circus Clown College in 1979 where he was voted class clown, then toured with the circus from 1979 to 1981. In 1982 he traveled with a circus in Mexico, for only one season due to certain undisclosed problems. As a clown he also appeared on Romper Room and the Chicago version of Bozo the Clown.

Goudeau then moved to Houston, Texas, and took a job as a writer/performer in a sketch comedy group. Unable to make a financial go, Goudeau found himself in Canada doing more juggling and riding a 6-foot-high (1.8 m) unicycle on what Goudeau describes as "fake ice that was sprayed with vegetable oil". Goudeau and his partner Frank were booked to work a cruise ship but Frank was injured in a paragliding accident, leaving Frank unable to perform. Goudeau quickly wrote a one-man show that evolved into the current act at the Lance Burton Show.

From there, Goudeau began his solo career, and landed a gig at the Folies Bergere in Las Vegas, Nevada where he met both his wife Theresa Goudeau and Lance Burton. (Burton himself was also only a short variety act at the time.) From there Goudeau worked with Melinda, The First Lady Of Magic until he was fired (on Christmas Day).

On July 3, 1991, Goudeau began a juggling act for the Lance Burton show at the Monte Carlo Hotel in Las Vegas. Goudeau took a short time off in 1995/1996 during summer months to become a Gag Instructor at the Ringling Brothers Barnum and Bailey Circus Clown College. At the Lance Burton Show, Goudeau does 12 minutes of comedy/stunt juggling. Atop yet another unicycle he tells jokes and juggles a wide variety of items both dangerous (chainsaws, fire, knives) and seemingly un-juggleable (bean bag chairs).

== Penn years ==
Goudeau first encountered Penn Jillette when he was a street performer in San Francisco. Goudeau introduced himself as a working juggler to Penn after a Penn & Teller performance. Penn seemed impressed by the entirely normal street attire Goudeau wore when he wasn't performing.

Penn and Goudeau hooked up again when the Penn & Teller show moved out to Vegas. Both being part of Vegas's small variety arts community, they began to do lunch. Eventually Penn offered Goudeau a job doing warm-up juggling for his act as well as doing some comedy consulting for the TV show "Penn & Teller's Sin City Spectacular".

Goudeau was slated to work with Penn on a Sci-Fi Channel television show called "Penn Jillette's Fi-Sci." Sci-Fi did not pick up the show, however.

While working with Penn as a writer for Penn & Teller's "Bullshit!" show, the two kicked around an idea for a daily talk radio show, based largely around their shared skepticism, atheism, and libertarian beliefs. On January 3, 2006, Penn Radio began broadcasting from Penn's personal studio, Vintage Nudes Studio, in his home "The Slammer".

It was while cycling with Penn that Goudeau conceived an idea for novelty barbecue covers.

=== Secret Tour de France rider ===
During July 2006, Goudeau was experimenting with a Tour de France exercise program. Penn referred to Goudeau as a "Secret Tour de France rider". Goudeau cycled a leg of the tour every day on a stationary cycle. He matched the time (albeit not the speed/distance) of the fastest rider for each leg. He estimated he rode about a third of the race's actual distance and lost about one pound for every ten hours he spent on his bike. He lost 12 pounds in total. He biked roughly 4 to 6 hours each day the race was held. The final day of the race Goudeau seems to have not ridden the full leg as he claimed he won the race roughly an hour ahead of the fastest ride. Goudeau also noted he had not changed his diet.

The early part of his ride caused him some problems with his stage performance. In front of a show attended by many of the casino's executive staff, he crashed a unicycle on stage when he didn't have the energy to jump onto it properly. Many people in the audience assumed this was part of the act and found it hilarious.

=== BBQ with Bobby Flay ===
Goudeau appeared on Episode 25 of Season 3 of BBQ with Bobby Flay. Goudeau showed Flay how to prepare shark tacos.

== Post-Penn radio ==
- In April 2007, Michael Goudeau was in Paris to appear in an episode of France's Magic TV show "Le Plus Grand Cabaret Du Monde", a French variety show that features clowns, magicians, acrobats, contortionists, and jugglers from all around the world.
- Michael Goudeau appeared on The Tonight Show on May 4, 2007. He appeared as a "candle singer" for the "Does This Impress Ed Asner" segment. Goudeau played a slightly nervous movie projectionist from Las Vegas. He tried to impress Ed Asner by holding his hands over burning candles and yelping in pain to the tune of the Blue Danube Waltz.
- On Monday, March 31, 2008, Penn updated viewers of his Crackle video podcast regarding Goudeau's current situation. A fire at the Monte Carlo on January 26, 2008, resulted in the temporary shut down of The Lance Burton Show. However, Penn's Crackle video reports the show is back in production and Goudeau is back juggling at the show. As well, with the end of the writer strike, Goudeau is back writing for the 6th season of Bullshit!. Penn also commented that Goudeau has recently taken up cheese making as a hobby.
- On Friday, July 10, 2009, Goudeau was a panelist at The Amazing Meeting 7.
- On Thursday, July 16, 2009, Goudeau was nominated for an Emmy award for Outstanding Writing for Nonfiction Programming.
- Goudeau has started a blog called The Pancake Project wherein he tries to make pancakes resemble animals and works of art.
- Goudeau has put in some appearances on Las Vegas's local NPR affiliate KNPR:
  - November 2, 2009
  - November 11, 2009
- Goudeau and Lance Burton appeared on the August 9, 2010, broadcast of Cash Cab.
- Goudeau is working on an indie magic film with Lance Burton.
- Goudeau is writing for Penn & Teller: Tell a Lie show.
- Goudeau published a cookbook called Extreme Pancakes.

=== Podcast interviews ===
Michael Goudeau has been interviewed on the following podcasts:

- The April 5, 2009, edition of The Conspiracy Skeptic podcast.
- The April 14, 2009, edition of the iTricks Magic Stars Podcast.
- The June 20, 2009, edition of the Dogma Free America podcast.
- The July 5, 2009, edition of the Amateur Scientist podcast.
- The August 12, 2009, edition of the Skeptics' Guide To The Universe podcast.
- The August 17, 2009, edition of the Skepticality podcast.
- The April 17, 2011, edition of Skeptically Speaking
- Goudeau was interviewed on the RadioDad radio show about his Pancake Project web site. MP3 clip here.
- Goudeau was interviewed on Penn Jillette's podcast "Sunday School" on Adam Carolla's Podcast Network. Full Ep Here.
- The June 21, 2017, edition of Matt & Mattingly's Ice Cream Social. Full Episode Here.

== Penn & Teller Bullshit! appearances ==
Goudeau has performed various cameo roles, both in and out of costume, on Penn & Teller: Bullshit! Showtime series.

Season Three: Life Coaching
Goudeau plays a ventriloquist.

Season Three: Holier than Thou
Goudeau an irate letter writer and is seen in a photo "flipping the bird".

Season Three: College
Goudeau plays a bull with pom poms. He is later seen partially out of costume.

Season Three: Big Brother
In the opening and closing segments, Goudeau is in clown makeup.

Season Three: Hair
Goudeau is seen helping with a magic trick. He places a paper bag on the head of a model.

Season Three: Gun Control
Goudeau stands with a crowd of gun enthusiasts. He holds a submachine gun over his head.

Season Three: The Best
Goudeau juggles bean bag chairs behind Penn and Teller.

Season Three: Family Values
Goudeau wears a gorilla costume and kisses Teller.

Season Four: Abstinence
Goudeau is seen applauding a video monitor following a segment featuring a woman masturbating.

Season Five: Anger Management
Goudeau plays a chiropractor and attacks Teller.

Season Six: Being Green
Goudeau plays Smokey the Bear.

Season Six: World Peace
Goudeau plays a monkey, opposite Penn Jillette in a bear costume.

Season Six: Stranger Danger
Goudeau is seen sitting next to Teller in make-up.

Season Six: The Good Ol' Days
Goudeau is seen on the set directing Penn.

Season Seven: Violent Video Games
Goudeau gets shot by Penn Jillette during the opening sequence. The clown image in Penn's HUD (also during the opening sequence) is Goudeau. It was taken from Season Three's Big Brother episode.

Season Eight: Vaccinations
Goudeau appears with his son, who is autistic, alongside a topless woman in a Playboy Bunny costume. As the show's version of Jenny McCarthy, the woman recites the scientific conclusions refuting the link between vaccines and autism. Goudeau tells his son to keep his eyes forward.

== Awards ==
- Goudeau has been nominated for 8 prime time Emmy awards (5 as a writer, 3 as a producer).
- Goudeau has received three Writer's Guild Association nominations.
