= Gary Stockdale =

American composer (born 1952)

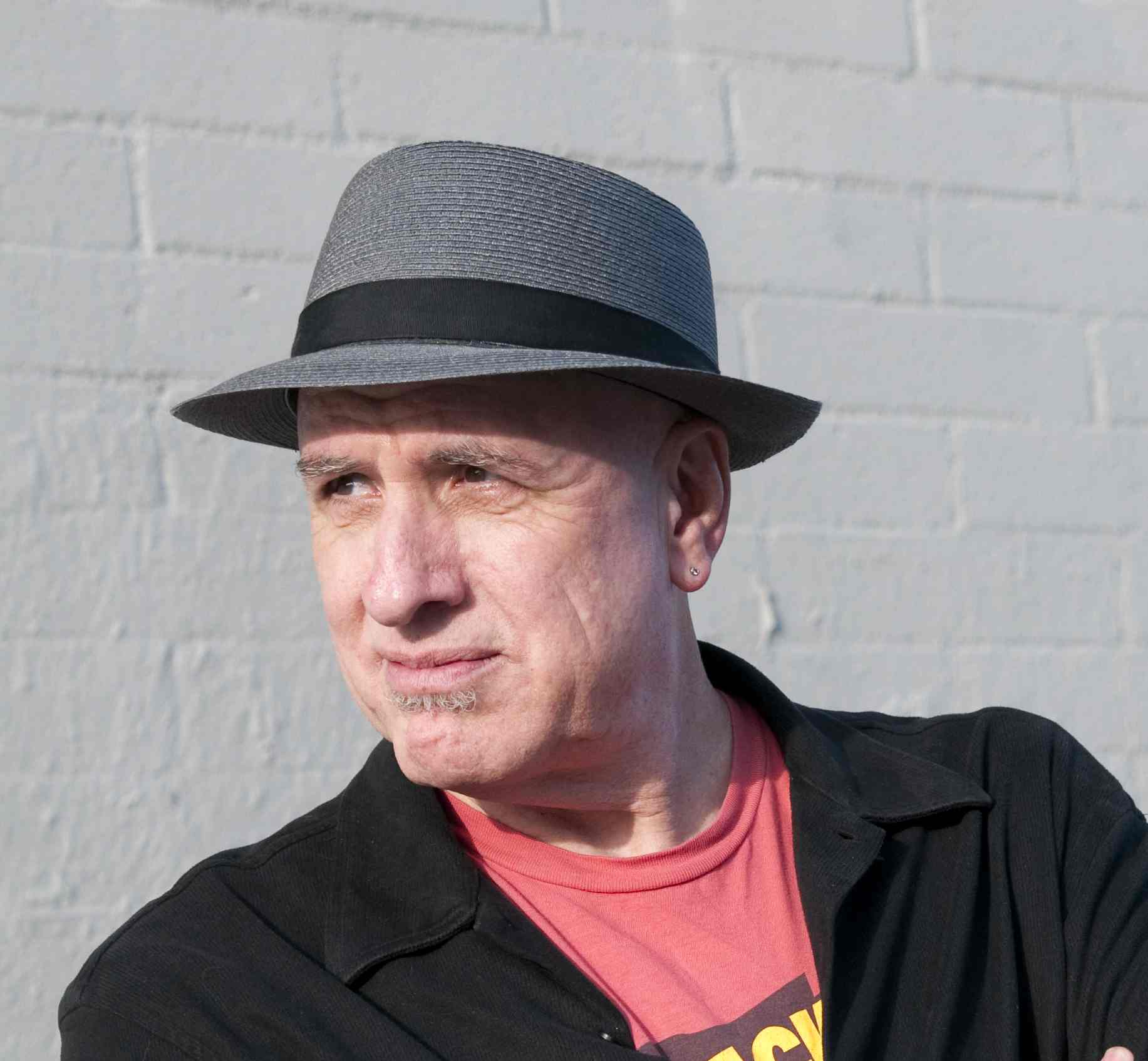
- Stockdale in 2010

Background information
- Born: November 15, 1952 (age 73); Glendale, California, U.S.
- Genres: Film score; Musical theatre; Pop; Ballad
- Occupations: Composer; Arranger; Vocalist; Music Director; Conductor; Singer-songwriter; Musician
- Website: garystockdale.com

Gary William Stockdale is a US composer, arranger. music director, conductor, singer-songwriter, musician (keyboard, guitar), and vocalist with over 400 published composing credits. He was mentored in film-scoring by Henry Mancini and contributed music to films scored by Lalo Schifrin. Stockdale is particularly renowned for his work collaborating with comedy-magic duo Penn & Teller, for which he received two Emmy Award nominations and a BMI Award, and for composing songs and scores for many other TV shows including Penn & Teller's Sin City Spectacular, Penn & Teller: Bullshit!, Sabrina the Teenage Witch,SpongeBob SquarePants, and To Tell the Truth, as well as for numerous films including Two Billion Hearts (with Schifrin), Dance of the Damned, and The Aristocrats. Stockdale is also known for his large volume of vocal work.

== Early life and education ==
Stockdale's mother Barbara Ann Stockdale (née Millaird), a Burbank, CA native, was a jazz singer who recorded with musicians from Nat King Cole’s band until she gave up professional singing to raise a family. His father John Edward Stockdale, a Chicago native, served in the US Army Air Corps in World War II as a B-25 pilot, then moved to Los Angeles to attend Loyola Law School and become a lawyer.

Stockdale was born and raised in Glendale, CA, in the Los Angeles area, where he started piano lessons at the age of 4 and sang in church choirs. Aiming to become an actor, after high school he attended the Robert C. Board College of Theatre in Glendale until it went defunct in 1971, and then Los Angeles City College until 1975. Starting in the Theater Department, where his classmates included Diana Canova (later Corinne Tate on Soap) and Debbie Gravitte (who later won a Tony Award for her performance in Jerome Robbins' Broadway), he found himself playing piano, composing songs, and serving as music director for department shows. He then switched to the Music Department, studying composition and piano performance.

Stockdale later enrolled in Lehman Engel’s BMI Musical Theatre Workshop. In 1980 he attended the Dick Grove School of Music, where he studied Film Scoring with jazz guitar virtuoso and TV composer Mundell Lowe. Stockdale learned about the craft of film music composition, and got advice on the music business, under the wing of four-time Oscar-winning composer Henry Mancini. Around this time he also took private Orchestration lessons from Dr. Albert Harris.

== Film music ==
Stockdale began his film-music composing career scoring director/producer Roger Corman’s first "art" film (entered in the 1989 Los Angeles Film Festival), Dance of the Damned, and another Corman film Stripped To Kill 2.

Stockdale met six-time Oscar-nominated composer Lalo Schifrin through his association with Henry Mancini. He co-wrote, with Schifrin, the score for Two Billion Hearts, and has worked with Schifrin on scores, often also playing electric keyboards, for many other films including Sam Peckinpah’s last film The Osterman Weekend, Doctor Detroit, Sudden Impact, F/X2, and Black Moon Rising.

He also wrote the scores for the Andy Sidaris films Picasso Trigger, Hard Ticket to Hawaii, and Savage Beach. Stockdale did the vocal arrangements for Money for Nothing, and scored Arizona Heat, Olympus Force, Forbidden City, Demonstone, and the US documentary film The Aristocrats that featured 100 world-renowned comedians including Robin Williams, George Carlin, Whoopi Goldberg, and Bill Maher all telling their version of the "World’s Dirtiest Joke".

Stockdale provided lead vocals in the films Lucy in the Sky and Two Billion Hearts (on the main title theme), and chorus vocals in films including The Prince of Egypt (for which he was the main U.S. vocal contractor), Star Wars: Rogue One, Star Trek: Beyond, The SpongeBob SquarePants Movie, Watchmen, War for the Planet of the Apes,10, S.O.B., Planes, Antz, The Matrix Reloaded, The Good German, Stripped To Kill 2, and The Polar Express. He also played keyboard in The Mean Season, The Dead Pool, andTokyo Blackout.

== Television music ==
Stockdale was composer and Music Director of the "Crimes Against Nature" Band for the Emmy-nominated TV variety show Penn & Teller's Sin City Spectacular on the FX TV channel, the documentary comedy series Penn & Teller: Bullshit! on the Showtime channel, The Unpleasant World of Penn & Teller, and Penn & Teller's Home Invasions ABC prime-time special and Don't Try This at Home NBC special. Songs for Penn & Teller's Sin City Spectacular were written by Stockdale with Penn Jillette, Teller, and Colman deKay, and included "Jellybean Aardvark" starring The Smothers Brothers, "Vegas Al's Polka Palace" starring "Weird Al" Yankovic, and "Freedom Dot Com" starring Jennifer Holliday at the MGM Grand Las Vegas (see videos of these songs on his YouTube channel in "External links" below). "Freedom Dot Com", as well as Stockdale's opening music for Penn & Teller: Bullshit!, were both nominated for Emmy Awards. Penn Jillette has said "Working in television, you really need a composer who can work in many styles ... Stockdale can do anything."

Other TV shows that Stockdale scored and/or arranged music for include Sabrina the Teenage Witch, To Tell the Truth, SpongeBob SquarePants, Team Knight Rider, They Came from Outer Space, Hayley Wagner: Star, Johnnytime, 20 Years of Comedy on HBO, The Hunt for Amazing Treasures, The Steven Banks Show, Comedy Central's Last Laugh, Cowboy U, A Home for the Holidays (CBS), The Independent Spirit Awards, The Best Defense, and the Love, American Style 1999 special, as well as for numerous commercials.

Stockdale was contracted for his first television vocal session by Henry Mancini's daughter Monica, in the chorus for The Carpenters "Music, Music, Music" TV special on ABC. Stockdale's singing can also be heard on The Simpsons,, Family Guy, B Positive, and Studio 60 on the Sunset Strip; backing up Adele singing Skyfall on the 2013 Oscars, Mary J. Blige singing Mighty River on the 2018 Oscars, and Camila Cabello singing Living Proof on The Ellen Show in 2019; in Disney's Nancy Kerrigan Special: Dreams on Ice (1995); and in featured solos on Cop Rock and an In-and-Out Burger commercial. He also portrayed James Bond's nemesis Blofeld in an episode (S1/E19) of Sabrina the Teenage Witch.

== Theatre music ==
Stockdale co-wrote, with Spencer Green, the irreverent adult musical spoof Bukowsical! loosely based on the life of German-American writer Charles Bukowski. The show's songs have been called "uncommonly terrific for the genre"; and the show has been praised for "the eclectic bounce of Stockdale's music and his and Green's lyrics" in the Los Angeles Times, with further praise for Stockdale found in Backstage, Variety, and more. The show earned the New York International Fringe Festival Award for Outstanding Musical, and has been performed in various theater companies all over the U.S.

He also composed the "creepy music [that] evokes both carnival and silent horror tunes" for Play Dead, an off-Broadway stage play by Teller and Todd Robbins. Stockdale's music has been featured in Penn & Teller's Broadway show The Refrigerator Tour and the off-Broadway show Penn & Teller Rot in Hell at the Beacon Theatre in New York City, and in Penn & Teller's show at the Penn & Teller Theater at the Rio resort in Las Vegas since 2001.

He wrote music for Billy the Mime's show America Lovesexdeath at The Flea Theater in New York City and incidental music for a production of Bus Stop at the Pasadena Playhouse. Stockdale has provided vocal direction, musical supervision, and vocal arrangements for the Shakespeare festival held at the Will Geer Theatricum Botanicum in Topanga, California.

Stockdale composed the music, teaming up again with Spencer Green on the lyrics, for Bumpersticker: the Musical, a show in the Hollywood Fringe Festival, with each song inspired by a slogan seen on a bumper sticker during a traffic jam. The show was noted for its examples of "how well the music & lyrics work together to make the writers' point" and was named by HuffPost as one of the top ten 2016 Los Angeles Theatre Productions.

== Other music ==
Stockdale has sung with Justin Timberlake, Aaron Neville, David Crosby, and Johnny Mathis, and was the original keyboard player in the Brian Setzer Orchestra. His voice can be heard on Neil Young’s album Living with War. The songwriting partners Barry Mann and Cynthia Weill have called Stockdale "... one of the greatest singers on the planet."

Stockdale has released two albums of his original songs, and his songs have hit the charts recorded by such artists as Angela Bofill and Little Big Stuff Music! founder David Guthrie. His albums have been said to "exude a warm, folk-flavored sincerity ... his voice conveys a melodic sincerity that, when combined with his arranging skills, enables a song to build to a satisfying finale ... A born storyteller and wizened voice of reason, Stockdale ... [delivers] knowing, inspiring messages."

Stockdale co-wrote, with Stephen Geyer, the song "Who Knows You Better" for Angela Bofill. He has arranged many records for jazz artist Keiko Matsui and drummer Akira Jimbo. His music is also featured in a not-yet-released video game, Penn & Teller's Smoke and Mirrors.

Stockdale has played in various Los Angeles area bands such as The Jenerators, which included actor members like Bill Mumy (Will Robinson on the 1960s series Lost in Space) and the late Miguel Ferrer (NCIS Assistant Director Owen Granger on NCIS: Los Angeles and Dr. Garret Macy on NBC’s Crossing Jordan). He is Music Director, Vocal Director/Arranger, and a singer for The Tribe, a revolving group of Los Angeles musicians and singers that includes Stephen John Kalinich, Freebo, Fuzzbee Morse, Grant Geissman, Carly Smithson, Rosemary Butler, Marc Mann, Gary Griffin, The Honeys, and Band Manager Lauri Reimer.

== Personal life ==
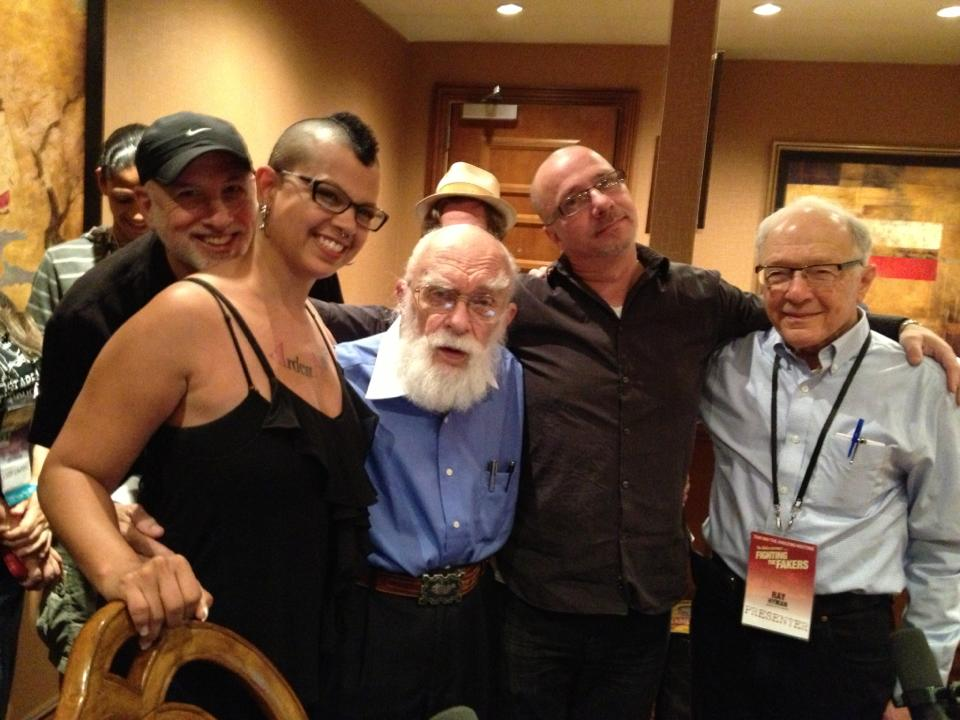
Participants in the "Skeptically Yours" podcast, recorded at The Amazing Meeting for skeptics in 2013. Left to right: Stockdale, podcaster Heather Henderson, magician and meeting founder James Randi, comedian Emery Emery, and psychology professor Ray Hyman.

Stockdale has been married since 1993 to Danelle "Dani" Hoffman Stockdale, an early childhood educator and education consultant as well as founder and past Principal Administrator of The Portable Classroom. Their home in Glassell Park, Los Angeles, California, US includes a professional music recording studio. They have two daughters, Savannah and Fiona. Savannah Stockdale is an Electronic dance music Artist who composes and performs as HVDES.

He is an advocate for skepticism, having appeared on the "Skeptically Yours" podcast recorded at James Randi’s The Amazing Meeting, and promoting skepticism in his songs, most notably "You Don't Know" (see 2018 video on his YouTube channel in "External links" below).

Stockdale has been on the faculty at Los Angeles College of Music in Pasadena, CA, teaching Vocal Performance, since 2016.

== Awards ==
- 1999, Emmy Award nomination, Outstanding Music and Lyrics for the song "Freedom Dot Com" starring Jennifer Holliday on Penn & Teller's Sin City Spectacular
- 2003, Emmy Award nomination, Outstanding Main Title Theme Music to Penn & Teller: Bullshit!
- 2007, New York International Fringe Festival Award for Outstanding Musical Bukowsical!
- 2017, BMI Cable Award: Composer, for Penn & Teller: Bullshit! theme music

== Discography ==
- 1987, Hard Ticket to Hawaii – Gary Stockdale, Label: Enjoy The Ride Records, ID: ETR117
- 2000, Electronic Age Vol. 2 – Gary Stockdale, Label: Killer Tracks, ID: KT129
- 2002, Penn & Teller Present: Music To Look At Boxes By – Gary Stockdale on tracks "Liftoff Of Love / Ripoff Of Love" and "The Penn & Teller Theme", Label: MOFO, UPC: 091827167823
- 2010, Bukowsical! Original Cast Recording – Gary Stockdale & Spencer Green, Label: Kritzerland Records, ID: KR 20017-4
- 2011, Sure of Mice Elf – Gary Stockdale, Label: Cd Baby, UPC: 0789875017022
- 2017, Keep Letting Go – Gary Stockdale, Label: Global Recording Art, UPC: 646413136228
