= List of FIFA World Cup official films =

Since 1954, FIFA has sanctioned an official documentary film for each edition of the World Cup. FIFA also released a retroactive official film commemorating the 1930 tournament. Up to 2002, 35 mm film was used for the footage.

== List ==
Year	Host country	Title	Narrator(s)	Refs	Notes
1930	Uruguay	The 1930 FIFA World Cup Uruguay - The new official film	No narrator		Retroactive 14-minute film released by FIFA in 2005.
1934	Italy	No known official film			
1938	France	Coupe du Monde de Football 1938	Jean Antoine		A film was commissioned by the French Football Federation and directed by René Lucot. It is considered the official World Cup film by some sources, though lists generally do not include it.
1950	Brazil	No known official film			
1954	Switzerland	German Giants	Emil Fersil		
1958	Sweden	Hinein!	Herbert Zimmermann; Heribert Meisel; Heinz Gottschalk		An UFA production with commentary in German. The title is German for "[It's] in!", often shouted after a goal is scored.
1962	Chile	Viva Brazil	John Fosberry; Allan Grace		
1966	England	Goal!	Nigel Patrick		The first World Cup film in colour; the 1966 television coverage was monochrome.
1970	Mexico	The World at Their Feet	Patrick Allen		
1974	West Germany	Heading for glory	Joss Ackland		
1978	Argentina	Copa 78 - O Poder do Futebol Campeones	Sérgio Chapelin; Steve Hudson		Two versions of the 1978 official film exist, the first "Copa 78 – O Poder do Futebol" ("Cup '78: The Power of Football") was made by Brazilian directors Maurício Sherman and Victor di Mello in 1979 but was later withdrawn by FIFA because of its controversial content. The film includes an interview with Rodolfo Galimberti, one of the leaders of the Montoneros guerrilla group and also made accusations that the Argentinian competition organisation committee had deliberately hindered Brazilian chances of success by tampering with the pitch at Mar del Plata. The film is available on the Internet Archive. The second film (Campeones, "Champions") was made by Worldmark Productions in 1991 and uses much of the footage shot in 1978, but omits all of the controversial interviews and commentary. This film also uses television footage of goals otherwise unrecorded by the cinematic cameras used in the original production, and also overdubs simulated crowd noise in several scenes. This version is now the only official 1978 film released by FIFA for broadcast or purchase.
1982	Spain	G'olé!	Sean Connery		Title mixes "Goal" with the Spanish chant ¡Olé!.
1986	Mexico	Hero Memorias del Mundial de Futbol Mexico '86	Michael Caine; Domingo Alvarez		Available on YouTube.
1990	Italy	Soccer Shoot-Out	Edward Woodward		
1994	United States	Two Billion Hearts	Liev Schreiber		
1998	France	La Coupe de la Gloire	Sean Bean		Title is French for "The Cup of Glory".
2002	South Korea; Japan	Seven Games from Glory	Robert Powell		
2006	Germany	The Grand Finale	Pierce Brosnan		Direct-to-video release.
2010	South Africa	The Official 2010 FIFA World Cup Film in 3D (also an official film: Match 64)	Ian Darke		64-minute Blu-ray 3D with footage from the 25 matches broadcast in 3D, plus interviews.
2014	Brazil	The Road to Maracana: The Official 2014 FIFA World Cup Film	No narrator		Available on Amazon Prime Video and YouTube.
2018	Russia	Dreams - The Official Film of the 2018 FIFA World Cup	Damian Lewis		Available on Amazon Prime Video and YouTube.
2022	Qatar	Written in the Stars FIFA World Cup Qatar 2022: A Historic World Cup	Michael Sheen; Francis Pardeilhan		Available on FIFA+.
2022	Qatar	Captains of the World	No narrator		Docuseries produced in a collaboration between FIFA+, Fulwell 73 and Netflix. Available on Netflix.

== FIFA Women's World Cup ==
FIFA has also produced films about the Women's World Cup starting with the 2011 edition.

Year	Host country	Title	Narrator(s)	Refs	Notes
2011	Germany	The Class of 2011			Available on FIFA+.
2015	Canada	The Story of the 2015 FIFA Women's World Cup			Available on FIFA+.
2019	France	Le moment			Available on FIFA+ and YouTube.
2023	Australia; New Zealand	Moments			Available on FIFA+ and YouTube.

== See also ==
- Lists of films by studio
