= Future Fear =

- Directed by: Lewis Baumander
- Screenplay by: Lewis Baumander; Glen Cullen; Jules Delorme; Philip Jackson
- Produced by: Daniel D'Or; Philip Jackson
- Starring: Jeff Wincott; Maria Ford; Stacy Keach
- Cinematography: Graeme Mears
- Edited by: Robert L. Goodman; David Ransley
- Music by: Donald Quan
- Production company: Aliceco Inc.
- Distributed by: New Horizons Pictures
- Release date: December 22, 1998
- Running time: 77 minutes
- Country: United States
- Language: English

Future Fear is a 1998 American science fiction film directed by Lewis Baumander. The film stars Jeff Wincott as Dr. John Denniel, a geneticist who has found a cure to an extraterrestrial virus that threatens to kill everyone on earth. General Wallace, played by Stacy Keach, wants to repopulate earth with a purely Aryan race of humans. He sends an assassin, Maria Ford, to try to stop Dr. Denniel before he is able to save mankind from the virus. The action in the film takes place in the year 2018.

== Cast ==
- Jeff Wincott as John Denniel
- Maria Ford as Anna Pontaine
- Stacy Keach as General Wallace
- Shawn Thompson as Robert
- Kristie Ropiejko as Yvette
- Michael Seater as Young John Denniel
- Danielle Dasilva as Young Anna Pontaine
- Robert Tinkler as Young Wallace
- Stephanie Jones as Deniel's Mother
- Michael Berger as Denniel's Father
