= Two Billion Hearts =

Two Billion Hearts (Todos os Corações do Mundo)
- Directed by: Murilo Salles
- Narrated by: Liev Schreiber, Antônio Grassi
- Music by: Gary Stockdale
- Release date: 1995
- Running time: 106 minutes
- Countries: United States; Brazil
- Languages: English; Portuguese

Two Billion Hearts (Portuguese: Todos os Corações do Mundo) is the official documentary film of the 1994 FIFA World Cup held in the United States.

The American version of the film is narrated by Liev Schreiber and tells the story of the 1994 FIFA World Cup which was won by Brazil who beat Italy in the final.

== Summary ==
Two Billion Hearts is a documentary, narrated primarily in English, that follows the global enthusiasm of the 1994 World Cup. The 106 minute long film was produced and released in 1995. The film focuses on the experience of fans and the cultural significance of soccer. The film is made through a combination of interviews of fans, players, and soccer experts, and observational footage of the games, to capture the events instead of relying on a scripted narration.

The tone of the film was mainly observational and celebratory, focusing on the connection between everyone that was watching, to the game itself. The narrative is told in multiple different perspectives as it shifts between countries, communities, to personal stories, displaying how diverse the environment was.

== Film Contributors ==
| Director | Murilo Salles | | |
| Producers | Leonardo Gryner | Carlos Roberto Osório | Sergio Villela |
| Writers | Murilo Salles | George Vecsey | |
| Stars | Roberto Baggio | Bebeto | Dennis Bergkamp |
