= Penn & Teller =

American illusionists and entertainers

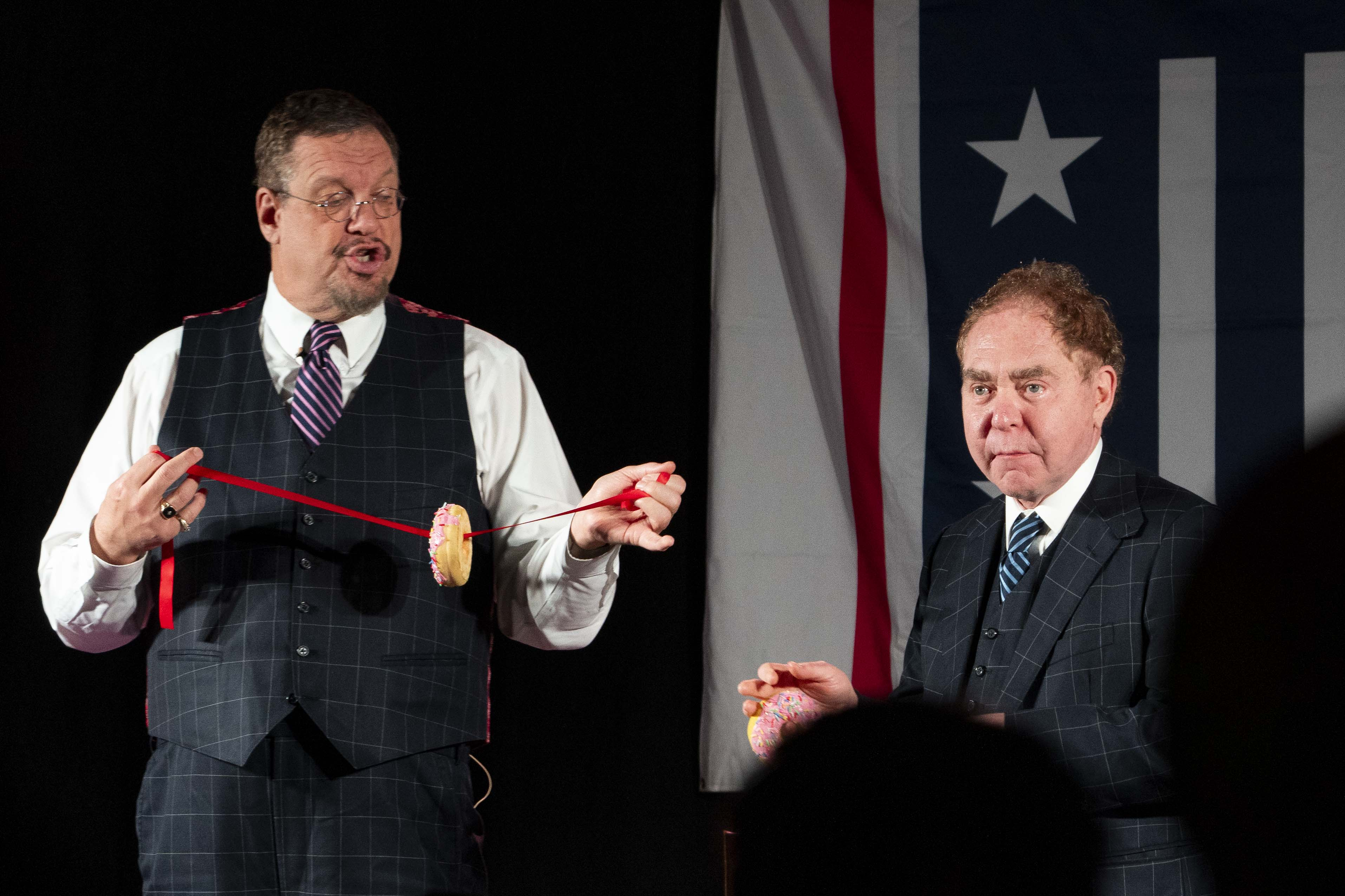
- Penn Jillette (left) and Teller (right) in 2023
- Born: Penn Fraser Jillette; March 5, 1955 (age 71) Raymond Joseph Derickson Teller; February 14, 1948 (age 78)
- Occupations: Magicians, entertainers
- Years active: 1975–present
- Known for: Magic, comedy, skepticism
- Website: www.pennandteller.com

Penn & Teller (Penn Jillette and Teller) are American magicians, entertainers, and scientific skeptics who have performed together since 1975. They are noted for their ongoing act that combines elements of comedy with magic.

The duo has been featured in numerous stage and television shows such as Penn & Teller: Fool Us and currently perform in Las Vegas at The Rio, the longest-running headliners to play at the same hotel in Las Vegas history. Jillette serves as the act's orator and raconteur. Teller generally does not speak while performing, but communicates through mime and nonverbals, though his voice can occasionally be heard during their live shows and television appearances. Besides magic, the pair has become associated with the advocacy of scientific skepticism and libertarianism, particularly through their television show Penn & Teller: Bullshit!, although Penn retracted his support for libertarianism in 2020.

== Career ==
Penn and Teller were introduced to each other by Weir Chrisemer, and they performed their first show together at the Minnesota Renaissance Festival on August 19, 1975. From the late 1970s through 1981, Penn, Teller, and Chrisemer performed as a trio called "The Asparagus Valley Cultural Society", which played in Philadelphia’s Walnut Street Theater, and in San Francisco, California, at the Phoenix Theater. Chrisemer helped to develop some bits that continued, most notably Teller's "Shadows" trick, which involves a single red rose. The group disbanded in 1981 after Chrisemer quit show business, leaving Penn Jillette and Teller to work as a pair on a show called "Mrs. Lonsberry's Seance of Horror".

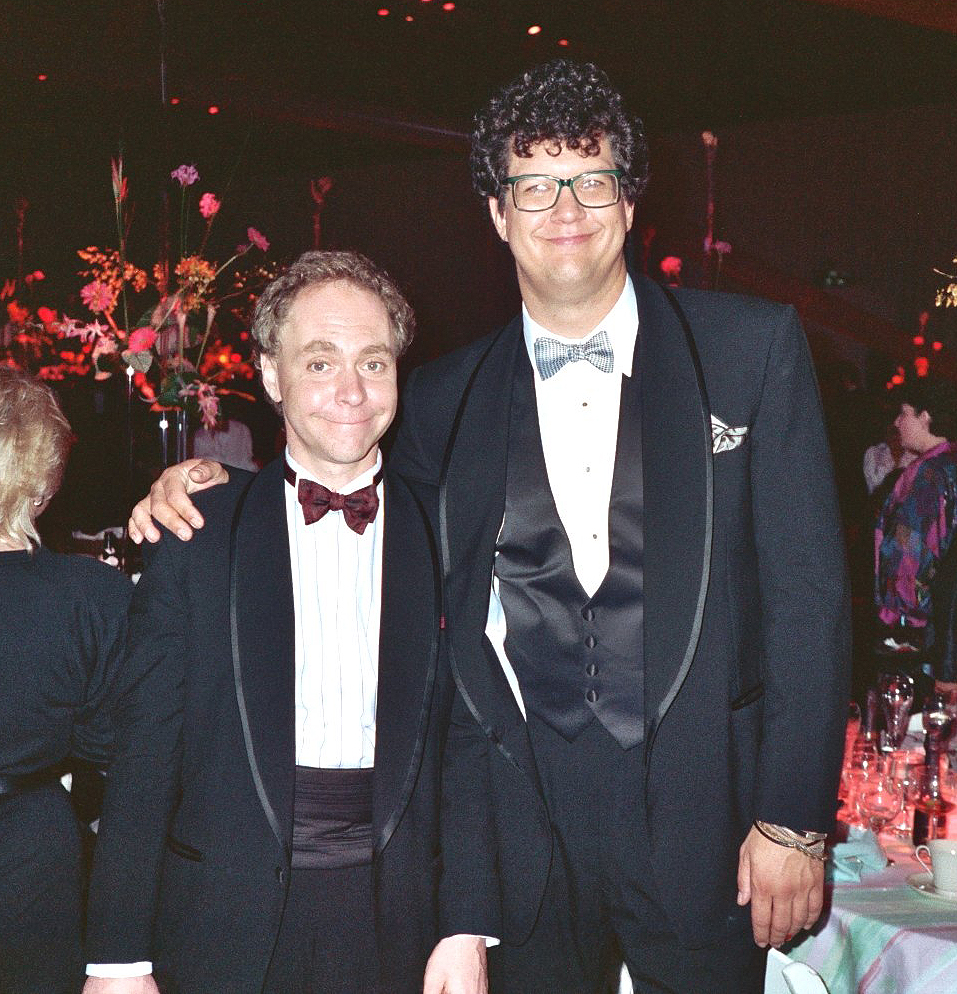
Penn & Teller in 1988, at the 40th Emmy Awards

By 1985, Penn & Teller were receiving positive reviews for their Off Broadway show and Emmy Award–winning PBS special Penn & Teller Go Public. In 1987, they began the first of three Broadway runs. The same year, they appeared as three-card Monte scam artists in the music video for "It's Tricky" by Run-DMC. Through the late 1980s and early 1990s, the duo made numerous television appearances on Late Night with David Letterman and Saturday Night Live, as well as The Tonight Show with Jay Leno, Late Night with Conan O'Brien, Today, and others.

Penn & Teller had national tours throughout the 1990s, gaining critical praise. They have also made television guest appearances on Babylon 5 (as the comedy team Rebo and Zooty), The Drew Carey Show, a few episodes of Hollywood Squares from 1998 until 2004, ABC's Muppets Tonight, FOX's The Bernie Mac Show, an episode of the game show Fear Factor on NBC, NBC's The West Wing, in a two-part episode of the final season of ABC's Home Improvement in 1998, four episodes during season 1 of Sabrina, the Teenage Witch in 1996, NBC's Las Vegas, and Fox's The Simpsons episodes "Hello Gutter, Hello Fadder" and "The Great Simpsina" and the Futurama film Futurama: Into the Wild Green Yonder in 2009. They appeared in the music video for Katy Perry's 2009 single "Waking Up in Vegas", in which they are thrown out of a hotel room by Perry.

Penn and Teller made an appearance on Bill Nye the Science Guy season 2, episode 7 - "Light Optics".

From 2003 to 2010, their Showtime television show Bullshit! took a skeptical look at psychics, religion, the pseudoscientific, conspiracy theories, and the paranormal. It has featured critical segments on gun control, astrology, Feng Shui, environmental issues, PETA, weight loss, the Americans with Disabilities Act, and the war on drugs.

The pair have written several books about magic, including Penn & Teller's Cruel Tricks For Dear Friends, Penn & Teller's How to Play with Your Food, and Penn & Teller's How to Play in Traffic. Since 2001, Penn & Teller have performed in Las Vegas at the Rio All Suite Hotel and Casino.

Penn Jillette hosted a weekday one-hour talk show on Infinity Broadcasting's Free FM radio network from January 3, 2006, to March 2, 2007, with cohost Michael Goudeau. He also hosted the game show Identity, which debuted on December 18, 2006, on NBC.

Their television series Penn & Teller Tell a Lie premiered on the Discovery Channel on October 5, 2011.

Since 2010, Penn & Teller have hosted Penn & Teller: Fool Us, originally on ITV, moving to The CW in 2015.

Penn & Teller credit magician and skeptical activist James Randi for their own careers. During an interview at TAM! 2012, Penn stated that Randi's book Flim-Flam! was an early influence on him, and said that "If not for Randi there would not be Penn & Teller as we are today."

In early 2022, Penn and Teller competed in season seven of The Masked Singer as "Hydra" of Team Bad. Because of Hydra's three-legged design and large size, the costume had to be assembled back stage while "Hydra" had to be wheeled out on a special platform to get it to and from the stage. Penn operated the left side of "Hydra" while Teller operated the right side of "Hydra". They were eliminated on the week of April 6 where it was shown that Teller used a puppet of a rabbit in a hat to "operate" the central head of "Hydra". Teller was given most of the singing due to how rarely people hear his voice and the possibility of people recognizing Penn's voice. Nicole Byer, who was the guest panelist of the night, successfully guessed the duo to be underneath the "Hydra" masks.

== Off-stage relationship ==
Jillette stated in a video where he and Teller responded to questions from members of Reddit, and also in a video interview for Big Think, that while he and Teller share few interests outside magic, Teller is his best friend, and his children treat Teller as a close relative. He stated that while most entertainment partnerships such as Martin and Lewis and Lennon–McCartney were based on a deep affection for each other that lends to a certain volatility when things go wrong, their business relationship and friendship is based on a respect for each other. Teller has made similar statements. In an NPR interview, Teller said their disagreements often lead to better artistic decisions because they bring out new ideas and expand the range of discussion.

== Honors ==
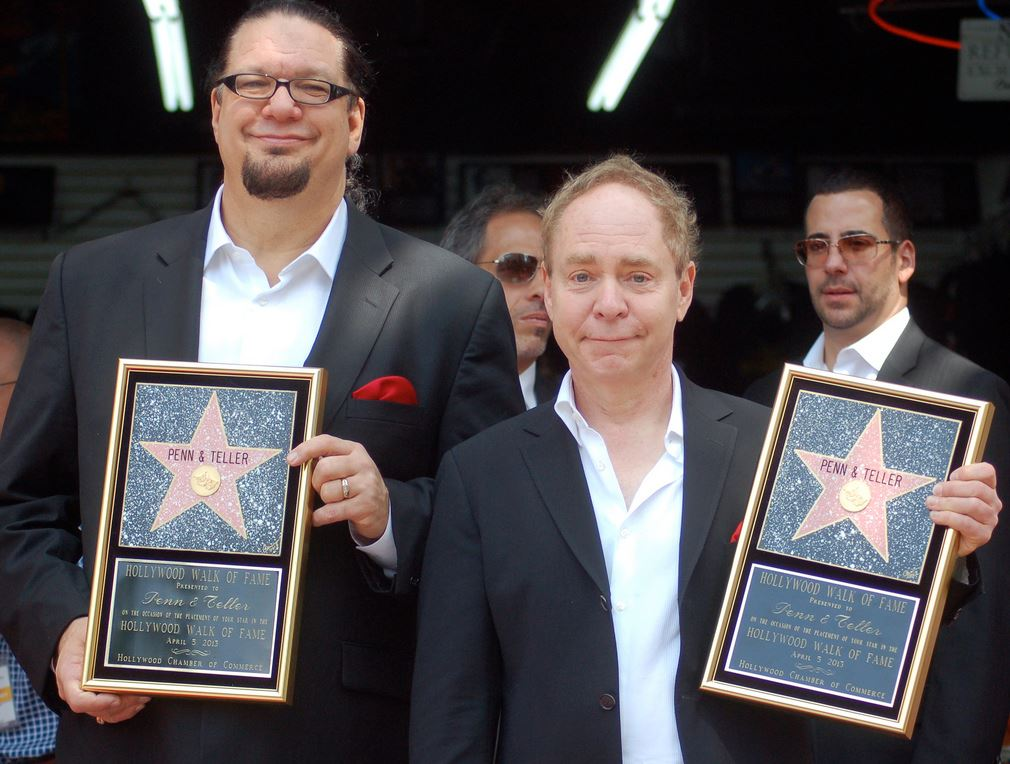
Penn & Teller at a ceremony to receive a star on the Hollywood Walk of Fame in April 2013

On April 5, 2013, Penn & Teller were honored with the 2,494th star on the Hollywood Walk of Fame for their achievement in the category of Live Performance. Their star is a few steps away from the star of Harry Houdini and down the street from The Magic Castle. For years they were denied entry to The Magic Circle due to their tendencies to reveal how magic tricks are done during performances, but in 2025 they were finally given membership during their 50th-anniversary residency at the London Palladium.

They are also recipients of a Hugh M. Hefner First Amendment Award.

In 2007, they won the Scripps Howard Super Sage Award. Their prediction of Indianapolis beating Chicago, 28-17, in Super Bowl XLI tied for the closest to the actual final score of 29-17 out of the 100 celebrities who participated in the Scripps Howard Celebrity Super Bowl Poll. They won a coin flip with Michael Phelps and Buzz Aldrin who made the same prediction.

In 2014, they were nominated for a BAFTA Award for their documentary Tim's Vermeer.

For their contributions to the West End production Magic Goes Wrong with Mischief Theatre, they were nominated for a 2020 Olivier Award.

== Tricks ==
Penn & Teller perform their own adaptation of the famous bullet catch illusion. Each simultaneously fires a gun at the other through small panes of glass and then "catches" the other's bullet in his mouth. They also have an assortment of card tricks in their repertoire, virtually all of them involving the force of the Three of Clubs on an unsuspecting audience member as this card is easy for viewers to identify on television cameras.

In one of their most politically charged tricks, they make an American flag seem to disappear by wrapping it in a copy of the United States Bill of Rights, and apparently setting the flag on fire, so that "the flag is gone but the Bill of Rights remains". The routine may also feature the "Chinese bill of rights", presented as a transparent piece of acetate. They normally end the trick by restoring the unscathed flag to its starting place on the flagpole; however, on a TV guest appearance on The West Wing, this final part was omitted. The methods of the trick were revealed by the duo in an episode of Fool Us. In 2025 the New York Times reported that the duo had stopped performing this trick because of the association between the American flag and the Make America Great Again movement.

One trick involves a powered nail gun with a quantity of missing nails from the series of nails in its magazine. Penn begins by firing several apparently real nails into a board in front of him. He then proceeds to fire the nail gun into the palm of his hand several times, while suffering no injuries. His pattern builds as he oscillates between firing blanks into his hand and firing nails into the board, and fires one blank into Teller's crotch. Near the end of the trick, he says that it is a trick and that he and Teller believe that it is morally wrong to do things on stage that are really dangerous—it makes the audience complicit in unnecessary human risk.

A trick introduced in 2010 is a modern version of the bag escape, replacing the traditional sack with a black trash bag apparently filled with helium. Teller is placed in the bag which is then pumped full of helium and sealed by an audience member. For the escape, the audience is blinded by a bright light for a second and when they are able to see again, Teller has escaped from the bag and Penn is holding it, still full of helium, above his head, before releasing it to float to the ceiling. The duo had hoped to put the trick in their mini-tour in London; however, it was first shown to the public in their Las Vegas show on August 18, 2010. In June 2011, Penn & Teller performed this trick for the first time in the United Kingdom on their ITV show Fool Us.

In one of their TV appearances on The Tonight Show, they performed a trick that involved all members of the audience. Each person received four cards which were torn apart and "mixed" so as to have two out of the eight halves selected in a process that seems random, as each person has freedom of moves throughout the process. Yet in the end, everyone ends up with two halves of the same card. Some mathematicians made a deep analysis of the trick and generalized it so it would work with any number of initial cards, using mathematical induction; their complete analysis was published in the Journal of Magic Research.

== Politics and personal lives ==
On Bullshit!, the duo described their social and political views as libertarian. In addition to disbelief in the paranormal and pseudoscience, Penn & Teller also take a view of doubtfulness to government authority. In various episodes of their show, they have heavily criticized both the Internal Revenue Service and the Environmental Protection Agency, as well as taken stances against circumcision and gun control, and in support of ideas such as freedom to eat fast food, private property, and lower taxes. Penn & Teller were both H. L. Mencken research fellows with the Cato Institute, a libertarian think-tank and research organization. Penn disavowed libertarianism in 2020, though is still affiliated with the Cato Institute.

Penn & Teller have shown support for the Brights movement and are now listed on the movement's website under the Enthusiastic Brights section.

They have described themselves as teetotalers.

In March 2026 they filed a friend of the court brief asking the United States Supreme Court to hear the appeal of a convicted murderer. The witness who identified the defendant had undergone hypnosis by the detective investigating the case. Penn told the New York Times "I think the evidence is bogus" and “the way they got the evidence was about the level of seriousness of a Las Vegas goofball magician.”

== Filmography ==
Year	Title	Role	Notes
1986	My Chauffeur	Bone & Abdul	
1987	Penn & Teller's Cruel Tricks for Dear Friends	Themselves	Direct-to-video
1989	Penn & Teller Get Killed	Themselves	
1991	The Eyes Scream: A History of the Residents	Themselves	
1994	Car 54, Where Are You?	Luther and Luther	Cameo appearance
2000	Fantasia 2000	Themselves	Presenting "The Sorcerer's Apprentice" Segment
2005	The Aristocrats	Themselves	Penn also co-directed the film
2013	Tim's Vermeer	Themselves	Directed by Teller, Produced by Penn
2014	An Honest Liar	Themselves	
2016	Director's Cut	Herbert Blount and Rudy Nelson	

=== Television ===
Year	Title	Role	Notes
1985	Miami Vice: The Prodigal Son	Penn's character was Jimmy Borges	
1987	Miami Vice: Like a Hurricane	Teller's character was Ralph Fisher	
1985	Penn & Teller Go Public	Themselves	Filmed at and first aired on KCET Los Angeles
1985–86	Saturday Night Live	Themselves	7 Episodes
1987	Invisible Thread	Themselves	Also known as Penn & Teller's Invisible Thread
1989	Exploring Psychic Powers... Live	Themselves	"Healed" a fake blister on Teller's thumb
1990	The Magic of David Copperfield XII: The Niagara Falls Challenge	Themselves	Guest appearance during the illusion "Camera Trick"
1990	Don't Try This at Home!	Themselves	
1991	Where in the World Is Carmen Sandiego?	Themselves	Presented one of the clues for where the villain had gone.
1992	Behind the Scenes	Themselves	10 Episodes
1993	Live from AT&T Bell Labs	Themselves	Aired only to American Schools via satellite
1994	Lois & Clark: The New Adventures of Superman	Themselves	Romick 1 episode, "Illusions of Grandeur"
1994	The Unpleasant World of Penn & Teller	Themselves	Channel 4
1995	Phobophilia	Themselves	
1995	The World's Greatest Magic II	Performed the "Bullet Catch" illusion for the show finale.	
1995–97	The Drew Carey Show	Archibald Fenn & Geller	2 Episodes
1997	Friends	Penn plays an encyclopedia salesman.	Episode: The One With the ‘Cuffs
1995–2008	The Tonight Show with Jay Leno	Themselves	4 Episodes: 14 November 1995, 27 November 1998, 13 May 2004, 25 November 2008
1996	Space Ghost Coast to Coast	Themselves	Episode: "$20.01"
1996–97	Sabrina, the Teenage Witch	Drell & Skippy	4 episodes
1997	Muppets Tonight	Themselves	Episode: "The Gary Cahuenga Episode"
1997	Penn & Teller's Home Invasion	Themselves	ABC Special
1997–2003	Late Night with Conan O'Brien	Themselves	3 Episodes: 16 October 1997, 7 June 2000, & 23 January 2003
1998	Dharma and Greg	Vincent & Mr Boots (Uncredited)	Episode: "The Cat's Out of the Bag"
1998	Babylon 5	Rebo & Zooty	Episode: "Day of the Dead"
1998–99	Penn & Teller's Sin City Spectacular	Themselves	24 Episodes
1998–2000	The Daily Show with Jon Stewart	Themselves	2 Episodes: 13 August 1998, 5 June 2000
1998–2004	Hollywood Squares	Themselves	60 Episodes
1999	Home Improvement	Themselves	Episode: "Knee Deep"
1999–2011	The Simpsons	Themselves	2 Episodes
2001	The Tick	Fiery Blaze & Friendly Fire	Episode: "The Big Leagues"
2002	¡Mucha Lucha!	Themselves	"The Return of El Maléfico"
2002	Grand Illusions: The Story of Magic	Themselves	Discovery Channel documentary (6 episodes)
2002	Fear Factor	Themselves	Episode: "Celebrity Fear Factor 3"
2003	Las Vegas	Themselves	Episode: "Luck Be a Lady"
2003	Penn & Teller's Magic and Mystery Tour	Themselves	Three-part mini-series
2003	The Bernie Mac Show	Themselves	Episode: "Magic Jordan"
2003–10	Penn & Teller: Bullshit!	Themselves	89 Episodes
2004	The West Wing	Themselves	Episode: "In The Room"
2004–10	Last Call with Carson Daly	Themselves	6 Episodes: 13 July 2004, 16 November 2005, 5 April 2007, 16 June 2008, 5 April 2010, 5 May 2010
2005	Penn & Teller: Off the Deep End	Themselves	Made for NBC, shown November 13, 2005
2005	Listen Up	Themselves	Episode: "Last Vegas"
2007–08	Late Show with David Letterman	Themselves	2 Episodes: #15.32, #15.113
2008	Numb3rs	Themselves	Episode: "S5E6"
2009	Futurama: Into the Wild Green Yonder	Themselves	Both are credited as voicing themselves, but only Penn speaks
2009	The Great American Road Trip	Themselves	Guests
2010	Fetch! with Ruff Ruffman	Themselves	They taught one of the show's contestants, Rubye, to perform magic tricks
2010–24	Hell's Kitchen	Themselves	4 episodes
2011	Cash Cab	Themselves	Guest contestants playing for charity
2011	Penn & Teller: Tell a Lie	Themselves	6 Episodes, Discovery Channel
2011–present	Penn & Teller: Fool Us	Themselves	70 Episodes, ITV1 (Season 1) and The CW (Seasons 2+)
2012	The Apprentice	Themselves	Penn competed and Teller appears for support
2013	Celebrity Apprentice	Themselves	Penn competed and Teller appears for support
2014	Wizard Wars	Themselves	Main judges in all of the 12 episodes to date, SyFy
2014	Blue Peter	Themselves	Guests
2015	Whose Line Is It Anyway?	Themselves	2 episodes
2015	StarTalk	Themselves	Season 2 Episode 4
2016–18	Who Wants to Be a Millionaire	Themselves	Season 15 Episode 27 and Season 16 Episode 104 and 105
2018	The Grand Tour	Themselves	Season 2, Episode 9
2018	Deception	Themselves	Episode: "Pilot"
2018	Big Bang Theory	Themselves	3 Episodes; Teller plays Larry Fowler, Amy's father.
2019	Scooby-Doo and Guess Who?	Themselves	Episode: "The Cursed Cabinet of Professor Madds Markson!"
2020	How It Really Happened	Themselves	Episode: "Siegfried & Roy Part 1: The Tiger Attack"
2021	Earth To Ned		Episode: “Alien vs. Nedator”
2022	The Masked Singer	Hydra	Season 7 contestant
2022	Young Sheldon	Pimple & Pus	Episode: "A Clogged Pore, a Little Spanish and the Future"
2022	The G Word	Themselves	Episode #3: "Money"
2026	Stuart Fails to Save the Universe	Alternate versions of themselves	Episode: "Spoiler: Gary Dies"

=== Books ===
Penn & Teller:

- Penn & Teller's How to Play in Traffic (1997, ISBN 1-57297-293-9)
- Penn & Teller's How to Play with Your Food (1992, ISBN 0-679-74311-1)
- Penn & Teller's Cruel Tricks for Dear Friends (1989, ISBN 0-394-75351-8)

Penn without Teller:

- Sock (2004, ISBN 0-312-32805-2)
- How to Cheat Your Friends at Poker: The Wisdom of Dickie Richard (2006, ISBN 0-312-34905-X; Co-author: Mickey D. Lynn)
- God, No!: Signs You May Already Be an Atheist and Other Magical Tales (2011, ISBN 1451610378)
- Every Day is an Atheist Holiday!: More Magical Tales from the Author of God, No! (2012, ISBN 1469276887)
- Presto!: How I Made Over 100 Pounds Disappear and Other Magical Tales (2016, ISBN 1501140183)

Teller without Penn:

- When I'm Dead All This Will Be Yours: Joe Teller—A Portrait by His Kid (2000, ISBN 0-922233-22-5)

== Other media ==
=== Music ===
- "Penn & Teller Present: Music to Look at Boxes By" (With Mike "Jonesy" Jones)
- "It's Tricky" by Run–D.M.C. (Penn & Teller shown throughout the video and at the end appear to take over the persona of Run–D.M.C.)
- "Something to Believe In" by The Ramones (Penn & Teller are seen supporting the fictitious "Hands Across Your Face" charity)
- "Waking up in Vegas" by Katy Perry (Penn & Teller are kicked out of their hotel room by Perry and her boyfriend.)
- "Why Wait" by Rascal Flatts
- "This Time I've Got It" by The Great Tomsoni & Co. (Penn & Teller in lab coats, Penn playing bass guitar)
- "Donna Everywhere" by Too Much Joy (Teller directed the video which features the band spending their entire budget as the video plays out. Teller features as a security guard and Penn as the band's representative)
- "Penn & Teller: Bullshit! Intro" from Penn & Teller: Bullshit!, with music composed, arranged, and conducted by Music Director Gary Stockdale
- "Freedom Dot Com" by Jennifer Holliday on Penn & Teller's Sin City Spectacular, with music composed, arranged, and conducted by Music Director Gary Stockdale
- "Jellybean Aardvark" by The Smothers Brothers on Penn & Teller's Sin City Spectacular, with music composed, arranged, and conducted by Music Director Gary Stockdale
- "Vegas Al's Polka Palace" by "Weird Al" Yankovic on Penn & Teller's Sin City Spectacular, with music composed, arranged, and conducted by Music Director Gary Stockdale
- "Grizzly Dance" by Troy Hurtubise on Penn & Teller's Sin City Spectacular, with music composed, arranged, and conducted by Music Director Gary Stockdale
- "Cow" by "The Ragin' Cajun" Doug Kershaw on Penn & Teller's Sin City Spectacular, with music composed, arranged, and conducted by Music Director Gary Stockdale
- ""Salome" by Terry Wood on Penn & Teller's Sin City Spectacular, with music arranged and conducted by Music Director Gary Stockdale

=== Video games ===
- Penn & Teller's Smoke and Mirrors 1995 – Absolute Entertainment for Sega CD & 3DO (unreleased)
- Steven Spielberg's Director's Chair 1996 – Knowledge Adventure for PC & Mac – As Leroy Paine and Sigmund Terrore
- Sabrina, the Teenage Witch: Spellbound 1998 – Simon & Schuster for PC – Voices for Drell & Skippy
- Penn & Teller VR: Frankly Unfair, Unkind, Unnecessary, & Underhanded 2019 – Gearbox Software for PC
- Borderlands 3 2019 – Gearbox Software for PS4, Xbox One & PC - Voices for Pain & Terror

The 1995 video game Penn & Teller's Smoke and Mirrors featured a mini-game called Desert Bus in which the player drove a bus route between Tucson and Las Vegas. Once reaching the destination, the player gets one point and, if desired, can then drive the return route. The game was considered by some to be long and boring yet found a cult audience. The entire set of games was actually more of a collection of tricks and pranks, rather than games meant to be actually good to play. Both in-game and in interviews Penn states that Desert Bus was a reaction to the controversy of violent video-games going on at the time. In essence making fun of this controversy, by creating a simulator "stupefyingly like reality".

The game has since been used in an annual charity event called "Desert Bus for Hope" run by the Canadian internet comedy troupe LoadingReadyRun. The fundraiser involves members of LoadingReadyRun (and occasional guests) playing the game and streaming that live online, while interviewing celebrities via Skype and accepting challenges for the audience, with all proceeds being donated to Child's Play. On November 14, 2011, an iOS port of Desert Bus was created and released in the iTunes Store. The game was developed in conjunction with the Desert Bus For Hope event and all profits from the game are donated to charity.

=== Attractions ===
- "Penn & Teller: New(kd) Las Vegas 3D" was a 2012 Halloween Horror Nights maze collaborated at Universal Orlando. It featured a backstory of Las Vegas being destroyed by Penn & Teller's latest magic trick involving a nuclear warhead gone wrong.

=== Theatre ===
- Magic Goes Wrong - a 2019 comedy play in collaboration with Mischief Theatre.
- The Mind Mangler: Member Of The Tragic Cicle - a 2022 comedy-magic play adaptation of the Mind Mangler Character from Magic Goes Wrong in collaboration with Mischief Theatre.
