= Maria Ford =

American actress, model, and dancer

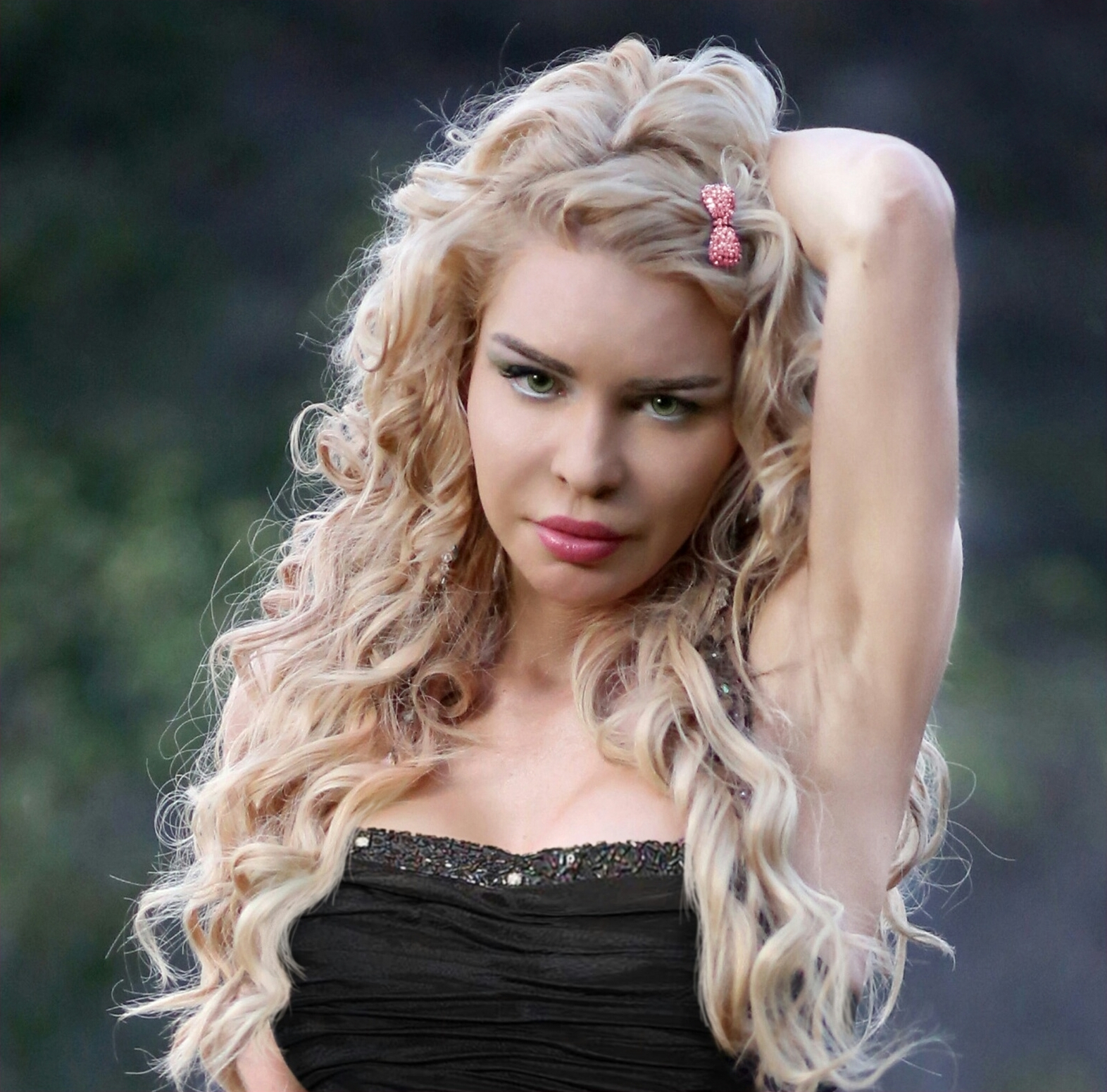
- Ford in 2013
- Born: Maria Ford
- Occupations: Actress, model, dancer
- Years active: 1985–present

Maria Ford is a film actress, dancer and pin up model. She is best known for her roles in erotic thrillers, vampire, and martial arts genre films.

== Filmography ==
=== Film ===
Year	Film	Role	Notes
1989	Stripped to Kill II: Live Girls	"Shady"	
1989	Dance of the Damned	Teacher	
1989	Masque of the Red Death	Isabella	
1990	The Haunting of Morella	Diane	
1990	Naked Obsession	Lynne Hauser	
1990	The Rain Killer	"Satin"	
1990	Slumber Party Massacre III	Maria	
1991	Ring of Fire	Julie	
1991	Future Kick	Dancer	
1991	Deathstalker IV: Match of Titans	Dionara	
1992	Final Judgment	Nicole	Direct-to-Video
1992	The Unnamable II: The Statement of Randolph Carter	Alyda Winthrop	
1993	Necronomicon: Book of Dead	Clara	Part 1
1993	Ring of Fire II: Blood and Steel	Julie	
1993	The Three Musketeers	Wench	Uncredited
1994	Angel of Destruction	Jo Alwood	
1994	Mind Twister	Melanie Duncan	
1994	Saturday Night Special	Darlene	
1995	The Wasp Woman	Caitlin	TV film
1995	Stripteaser	Christina Loren	
1995	Bram Stoker's Burial of the Rats	Madeleine	TV film
1995	Alien Terminator	McKay	
1995	Dillinger and Capone	Business Woman	Direct-to-Video
1996	Hot Ticket	Kim	
1996	Mind Games	Ivory / Tess	
1996	The Black Rose of Harlem	Alba	
1996	Night Hunter	Tournier	
1996	The Glass Cage	Dianne	
1996	The Showgirl Murders	Jessica Cross	
1997	Dark Planet	Helmsperson Salera, Alpha	
1997	Starquest II	Dancer In Flashback	Uncredited
1997	Future Fear	Anna Denniel	
1998	Casper Meets Wendy	Playmate	Direct-to-Video
1998	Some Nudity Required	Herself	Documentary
1998	The Dark Side of Hollywood	Herself	Documentary
1998	Addams Family Reunion	Beautiful Lounger	TV movie
1999	Michael Jordan: An American Hero	Gracious Hostess	TV movie
1999	I Like to Play Games Too	Suzanne	
1999	The Key to Sex	Christy	
2000	Night Calls: The Movie, Part 2	Brandi	Direct-to-Video
2000	The Independent	Poster Model	
2001	Perfect Fit	Perry	
2002	Role of a Lifetime	Margarette-Anne	
2003	Beethoven's 5th	Pretty Town Woman	Direct-to-Video
2006	Wedding Slashers	Newlywed Bride	Direct-to-Video
2007	E.D.E.N.	Guard	TV movie
2008	Beethoven's Big Break	Angry Neighbor	Direct-to-Video
2014	Sexy Storm Siren	Starring Role and Lead Dancer	Short
2015	Serpentine	Lead Dancer	Short
2016	Pleasures Garden	Starring Role and Lead Dancer	Short
2017	Dressed in Stardust Fashion Film	Actress / Model	Short
2018	Maria Ford Fashion Film	Herself	Short

=== Television ===
Year	Series	Role	Notes
1993	Tropical Heat	Margot	Episode: Smut and Nothin' But
1994	Hot Line	Kristin	Episode: Visions of Love
1998	Something So Right	Zora	Episode: Something About an Ex-Goddess
1998	Chicago Hope	Tori Landers	Episode: The Other Cheek
1999	Erotic Confessions	Jamie	Episode: Going Skiing
2000	Passion Cove	Donna	Episode: Lights! Camera! Action!
2002	Judging Amy	Waitress	Episode: Boys to Men
2003	7th Heaven	Pamela Perfect	Episode: The One Thing
2004	The Drew Carey Show	Crystal / Nancy, The Stripper	Episode: Assault with a Lovely Weapon
