= The Unpleasant World of Penn & Teller =

- Created by: Penn & Teller
- Directed by: Peter Orton
- Starring: Penn & Teller
- Music by: Gary Stockdale
- Country of origin: United Kingdom
- Original language: English
- No. of series: 1
- No. of episodes: 6

Production
- Running time: 30 minutes
- Production company: Channel X

Original release
- Network: Channel 4
- Release: 7 January – 11 February 1994

The Unpleasant World of Penn & Teller is a British magic show presented by Penn & Teller in 1994 on Channel 4. The show featured segments deconstructing magic tricks, while performing some of their signature comedy magic stunts. At the time, while highly popular in the United States, the pair was still unknown outside of the United States, and the show helped expose them to British audiences.

== Format ==
The first or middle segments would always feature a British celebrity like Stephen Fry or John Cleese who would participate in one of the pair's magic tricks.

The duo would make a running gag in several episodes, for example, poking fun at the popular British magician Paul Daniels. Another running gag that ended each episode was one in which the pair would promise the audience, in various ways, that they never used any camera tricks for their magic, only for a camera trick to be performed on the TV audience at that very moment.

The show included music by composer and Music director Gary Stockdale.

== Episodes ==
No.	Guest	Directed by	Written by	Original release date
1	Stephen Fry	Peter Orton	Penn & Teller	7 January 1994
2	John Cleese	Peter Orton	Penn & Teller	14 January 1994
3	Dawn French	Peter Orton	Penn & Teller	21 January 1994
4	Fiona Fullerton	Peter Orton	Penn & Teller	28 February 1994
5	Alexei Sayle	Peter Orton	Penn & Teller	4 February 1994
6	Christopher Reeve	Peter Orton	Penn & Teller	11 February 1994
