= Penn & Teller Tell a Lie =

American television series

- Created by: Penn Jillette; Teller; Golden
- Developed by: 117 Productions
- Starring: Penn Jillette; Teller
- Country of origin: United States
- No. of seasons: 1
- No. of episodes: 6 (list of episodes)

Production
- Executive producer: Peter Adam Golden
- Running time: 45 minutes

Original release
- Network: Discovery Channel
- Release: October 5 – November 9, 2011

Penn & Teller Tell a Lie is a six-part series starring Penn Jillette and Teller. Each episode contains six or seven stories, including a demonstration performed by the hosts during the recording of the show as the last story. One of the stories is falsified, and the rest are true. During each broadcast, viewers can guess which story is the lie, voting on Discovery's website, with the answer and voting results revealed at the end of the episode.

The series aired on the Discovery Channel beginning Wednesday, October 5, 2011. The show is also broadcast in the UK on Channel Quest which premiered on 2 May 2012.

== Development ==
On April 14, 2011, Penn and Teller announced that their previous show, Penn & Teller: Bullshit!, had ended and that a new show, Penn & Teller: Secrets of the Universe, would begin on the Discovery Channel. The show was later renamed Penn & Teller Tell a Lie.

Recording of the first episode began on June 1, 2011. The show started airing Wednesday, October 5, 2011.

== Critical reception ==
Reviews of the show have been mostly positive, although many reviewers compare the show to the Discovery Channel's other skepticism-themed show, MythBusters. Matt Blum of Wired Magazine wrote:

Skeptics, rejoice! MythBusters no longer is the only show that aims to teach its viewers to question their perceptions of reality before deciding what to believe. [...] It’s a very good show, which MythBusters fans will almost certainly enjoy and which non-MythBusters fans (if there are any who read this blog) should give a try.

Brian Lowry of Variety wrote that the show was "A perfect companion for Mythbusters" and "a clever way for Discovery to ventilate its whimsical side without pandering". Kevin McFarland of The A.V. Club called the show a mix of the icebreaker game "Two Truths And A Lie" mixed with a "Mythbusters-type reality show". He went on to say that the show was "sincerely watchable", but noted that "there are still kinks to be worked out".

== Episodes ==
No. overall	No. in season	Title	Original release date	U.S. viewers (millions)
1	1	"Head of Hair Can Lift a Mustang"	October 5, 2011	1.259
Claims about airplanes, alligators, heat shields, tigers, obscenity, picking up girls, and picking up mustangs
2	2	"You Can Blow Out a Forest Fire"	October 12, 2011	1.025
Stories featuring wing-walkers, bacon, wallpaper, didgeridoos, "mighty cheese", lasers, and forest fires
3	3	"Piranha Will Not Kill You"	October 19, 2011	1.185
Featuring gas tanks, wine, roadkill, eggs, robots, and piranha
4	4	"You Can Fly Using Hair Bleach for Fuel"	October 26, 2011	1.596
Butter knife, termites, panning for gold, coin toss, crooked house, peroxide rocket
5	5	"Hook and Loop Fabric is Stronger than Two Monster Trucks"	November 2, 2011	1.256
Machine guns, milk cloth, pizza in space, man vs horse, floating dessert, bottle game, velcro
6	6	"You Can Crack a Safe with Liquid Nitrogen"	November 9, 2011	0.970
Liquid nitrogen, tattoos, highway music and echolocation
