= Penn & Teller's Sin City Spectacular =

- Starring: Penn & Teller
- Country of origin: United States

Production
- Running time: 60 minutes
- Production companies: Buccieri & Weiss Entertainment; Pearson All-American Television

Original release
- Network: FX
- Release: August 10, 1998 – June 30, 1999

Related
- Penn & Teller: Bullshit!

Penn & Teller's Sin City Spectacular is an American television variety show hosted by Penn and Teller that aired on FX from August 10, 1998 to June 30, 1999. The show's aim was to revive the genuine variety shows from the past, such as The Ed Sullivan Show.

== Description ==
Sin City Spectacular was an hour-long program that featured many acts on the program that were bizarre, sideshow-type performances. These types of performances included Katzen, the tattooed lady who ate bugs, and her husband, the Enigma (also covered with tattoos), who swallowed swords and lightbulbs, and had two horns surgically implanted into his forehead. Often celebrities appeared performing previously unknown talents, such as actor French Stewart singing and dancing Hooray Pornography, Andy Dick tap-dancing, or Jerry Springer singing while the dancers fight behind him a la The Jerry Springer Show.

Musical highlights were Fred, an old-time barbershop quartet, singing "I Wanna Be Sedated"; Michael McKean as a distraught Edgar Allan Poe who breaks into a disco extravaganza with the Eight Deadly Sin Dancers', and comedian Carlos Alazraqui transforming the tradition of Irish River Dancing into a bizarre S&M spanking fantasy—which were the brainchild of writer Martin Olson. Outstanding straight musical acts like Dr. John and John Popper also appeared. In one performance, Popper jammed on the harmonica while Penn narrated a story and Teller illustrated it with card tricks. Other performers included comedians Kevin Meaney, Don Novello, Otto and George, Bobcat Goldthwait, Eric Idle, and Martin Mull.

Each show opened with a solo Penn and Teller performance. Some of their pieces, like "Cuffed to a Creep" where Penn finds himself handcuffed to a bizarre stranger (Teller) on a park bench, and "Balloon of Blood" in which Penn eloquently describes the strength and vulnerability of humanity, were borrowed from their stage show, while others, like Teller's "zippo lighter" piece, were written especially for the TV show.

The show was taped at the MGM Grand Las Vegas.

The FX network chose not to renew the show after the first season.

== Crew ==
- Bruce Gowers, Kent Weed, Ron de Moraes, Directors
- Michael L. Weinberg, Supervising Producer
- Paul Buccieri, executive producer
- Robert Weiss, executive producer
- Carole Propp, coordinating producer
- Penn & Teller, co-executive producer / writers
- Martin Olson, producer / writer
- Colman deKay, writing supervisor
- Jamy Ian Swiss, writer
- Michael Goudeau, writer
- Gary Stockdale, Composer, Music Director
- Bruce Ryan, production design
- Birgitte Mann, costume design
- Tiger Martina, choreographer
- Skip Burrows, property master, special effects
- John Monarch, Production Manager
- Kent Belli, Production Accountant
- Veronica Garrison, Las Vegas Production Coordinator
- Mark Mc Quown, construction coordinator
- Kieran Healy, lighting
- Laurie D. Muslow, talent executive

== Award Nomination ==
- Sin City Spectacular was nominated by the 1999 Emmy Awards in the category of Outstanding Music and Lyrics for the song "Freedom Dot Com" written by Music Director Gary Stockdale.
