= List of Penn & Teller: Bullshit! episodes =

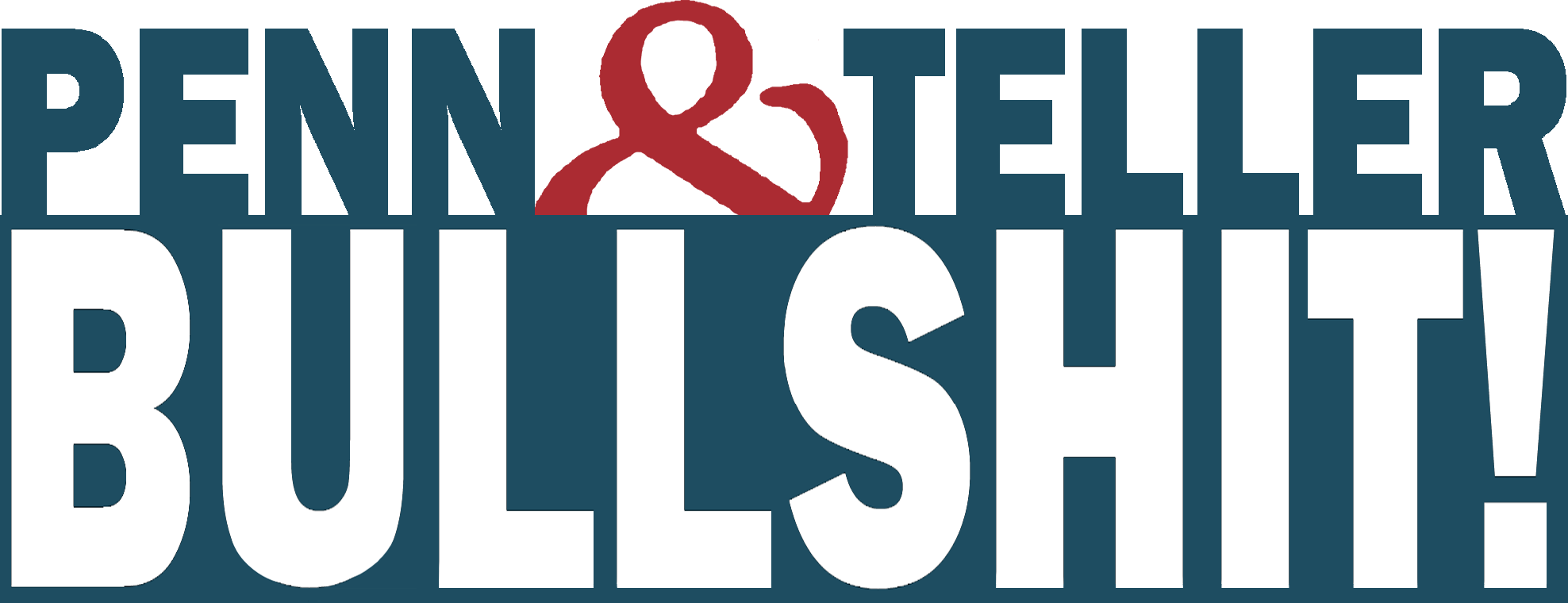

Penn & Teller: Bullshit! is an American documentary television series that aired from 2003 to 2010 on the premium cable channel Showtime. The series premiered on January 24, 2003, and 89 episodes aired over the course of the series in the span of eight seasons, concluding on August 12, 2010.

== Series overview ==
Season	Episodes	Originally released	
Season	Episodes	First released	Last released
1	13	January 24, 2003	April 18, 2003
2	13	April 1, 2004	September 2, 2004
3	13	April 25, 2005	August 1, 2005
4	10	April 3, 2006	June 5, 2006
5	10	March 22, 2007	May 24, 2007
6	10	June 19, 2008	August 21, 2008
7	10	June 25, 2009	August 27, 2009
8	10	June 10, 2010	August 12, 2010

== Episodes ==
=== Season 1 (2003) ===
No. overall	No. in season	Title	Original release date	Prod. code
1	1	"Talking to the Dead"	January 24, 2003	101
Penn and Teller introduce their series and explain their use of profanity. Then they look into the practices of popular psychics of today and reveal how those who claim to be in contact with the dead are actually performing an age-old trick called "cold reading".
2	2	"Alternative Medicine"	January 31, 2003	102
A look at chiropractic medicine, reflexology, magnet therapy, and a trip to an alternative medicine fair that ends in an operation at a crowded mall.
3	3	"Alien Abductions"	February 7, 2003	103
This show features three days spent at a UFO convention and a visit to an alien abduction group therapy session. It also explores the psychological explanations, and the influences of popular culture, on the typical abduction story.
4	4	"End of the World"	February 14, 2003	104
Criticizes the viewpoints of persons predicting the end of the world, with special focus on the Left Behind series and extreme survivalist methods. Also exposes the dangers inherent in the belief that the world is about to end.
5	5	"Second Hand Smoke / Baby Bullshit"	February 21, 2003	105
Critiques concerns on second-hand smoke and attempts to ban it, and the usefulness of baby education products.
6	6	"Sex, Sex, Sex"	February 28, 2003	106
Attacks penis and breast enlargement products, questions the usefulness of aphrodisiacs.
7	7	"Feng Shui / Bottled Water"	March 7, 2003	107
Seeks to disprove Feng Shui as a science while challenging claims on the quality of bottled water.
8	8	"Creationism"	March 14, 2003	108
Examines the constitutionality and scientific validity (or lack thereof) of creationism and intelligent design and defends evolution, with focus on a Georgia school board debate.
9	9	"Self-Helpless"	March 21, 2003	109
Attacks various forms of self-help programs, with an emphasis on firewalking.
10	10	"ESP"	March 28, 2003	110
Attacks people claiming to possess and teach extrasensory perception.
11	11	"Eat This!"	April 4, 2003	111
Attacks various weight loss diet products and plans while questioning genetic engineering food concerns. Features 1970 Nobel Prize winner Norman Borlaug. The line from this episode, "You need to shut the fuck up!", has become an internet meme.
12	12	"Ouija Boards / Near Death Experiences"	April 11, 2003	112
Challenges the Ouija board and investigates the nature of near-death experiences.
13	13	"Environmental Hysteria"	April 18, 2003	113
Attacks mainstream opinions on various environmental issues, including global warming, with a criticism of Greenpeace and Julia Butterfly Hill. Includes an experiment where people at an environmental rally sign a petition to ban water, disguised under the name Dihydrogen Monoxide, without thinking out the proposal critically.

=== Season 2 (2004) ===
No. overall	No. in season	Title	Original release date	Prod. code
14	1	"P.E.T.A."	April 1, 2004	201
Offers criticism of the animal rights movement, and particular attention to the PETA organization and its ties with the ALF, an animal liberation group, classified by the FBI as a domestic terrorist organization.
15	2	"Safety Hysteria"	April 8, 2004	202
Examines recent hysteria over the possibility of danger due to terrorism, questions the connection between mad cow disease and Creutzfeldt–Jakob disease, as well as school violence.
16	3	"The Business of Love"	April 15, 2004	203
Criticizes the popular concept and the selling of everlasting romantic love and personal compatibility by dating services and pop psych love experts, and questions monogamy as a forced aspect of healthy relationships.
17	4	"War on Drugs"	April 22, 2004	204
Questions the constitutionality of the "war on drugs" and common allegations against the medical value of cannabis.
18	5	"Recycling"	April 29, 2004	205
Criticizes certain aspects of recycling, including the increased cost of particular forms of recycling and the detrimental effect that certain forms of recycling have on the environment, and debunks numerous myths regarding landfills. Notes that people are generally more than happy to recycle and that it is the system that is flawed.
19	6	"12-Stepping"	August 19, 2004	210
Questions the effectiveness of 12 Step Programs, with a focus on Alcoholics Anonymous.
20	7	"Yoga, Tantric Sex, Etc."	May 13, 2004	207
Offers criticism on numerous activities in the New Age movement, including: yoga, tantric sex, cartomancy, medicinal herbs, and vortices (especially the Sedona Vortices).
21	8	"Fountain of Youth"	May 20, 2004	208
Offers criticism of addiction to plastic surgery, chelation, human growth hormone as an anti-aging agent, and details about the problems involved with botox.
22	9	"Death, Inc."	August 5, 2004	209
Offers criticisms of many claims made by businesses which offer funeral services, and investigates the validity of cryonics as a method of preserving a human body.
23	10	"Profanity"	August 12, 2004	206
Attacks the idea that certain words are inherently offensive and thus are (or should be considered) taboo, and questions the constitutionality of the FCC's broadcast standards on profanity.
24	11	"The Bible: Fact or Fiction?"	May 6, 2004	211
Offers criticism of claims that the Bible is historically and factually accurate, as well as the attempt to turn sacred text into scientific material. Also criticizes the Bible as a source of morality.
25	12	"Exercise vs. Genetics"	August 26, 2004	212
Criticizes the claims made by various commercial exercise products that promise more than they deliver, as well as investigating the methods gyms use to maximize profits. Argues that some people are genetically built to look fit, while others aren't, and that looking fit is not the same as being fit.
26	13	"Hypnosis"	September 2, 2004	213
Examines the various promises made by professional hypnosis, and seeks to refute the idea of "mind over body".

=== Season 3 (2005) ===
No. overall	No. in season	Title	Original release date	Prod. code
27	1	"Circumcision"	April 25, 2005	301
Argues against the alleged medical benefits of circumcision, and describes the negatives of the procedure.
28	2	"Family Values"	May 2, 2005	302
Argues that the "traditional" husband-and-wife family is a relatively recent creation. Supports gay marriage and polyamory, and also attacks the idea that homosexuals can be "cured".
29	3	"Conspiracy Theories"	May 9, 2005	303
Arguments against the 9/11 conspiracy theories, Apollo Moon Landing hoax accusations, and John F. Kennedy assassination conspiracy theories.
30	4	"Life Coaching"	May 16, 2005	304
Argues against life coaching, demonstrating that life coaches often have minimal training, that the programs achieve few real benefits, and that the life coaches prey on people's insecurities.
31	5	"Holier Than Thou"	May 23, 2005	305
A critical view of Mother Teresa, Mahatma Gandhi, and the Dalai Lama, arguing that they should not be held in such high regard as they are.
32	6	"College"	May 30, 2005	306
Opposition to political correctness, speech codes, and diversity requirements, especially on college campuses.
33	7	"Big Brother"	June 13, 2005	307
Opposition to surveillance and unwanted government encroachment on the private lives of U.S. citizens. Points out the large amount of resources that would be required to do this successfully.
34	8	"Hair"	June 20, 2005	308
Criticism to hair fashion and fads.
35	9	"Gun Control"	June 27, 2005	309
Against gun control laws.
36	10	"Ghost Busters"	July 11, 2005	310
Accuses "ghost hunters" of conducting pseudoscience. Dr. Steven Novella and 2004 Nobel prize winner Dr. Frank Wilczek appear.
37	11	"Endangered Species"	July 18, 2005	311
Criticism of the United States' Endangered Species Act, and how proponents are actually anti-capitalism rather than pro-environmentalism. Features Paul Watson of the Sea Shepherd Conservation Society, the Endangered Species Coalition, and early Greenpeace member Patrick Moore.
38	12	"Signs from Heaven"	July 25, 2005	312
Criticizes claims of supernatural "signs", arguing that people are seeing what they want to see. Includes attempts to prove the Shroud of Turin following its debunking in 1988, pareidolia producing visions of Jesus and the Virgin Mary in wood grain and a grilled cheese sandwich, and Audrey Santo and the weeping statues.
39	13	"The Best"	August 1, 2005	313
Criticism of people who engage in the pursuit of needless luxury.

=== Season 4 (2006) ===
No. overall	No. in season	Title	Original release date	Prod. code
40	1	"The Boy Scouts"	April 3, 2006	401
Protests the Boy Scouts of America not allowing homosexuals or atheists to join as a government-funded organization. Claims the control of the Boy Scouts by the LDS Church as the source of the discrimination.
41	2	"Prostitution"	April 10, 2006	402
Pro-legalization of prostitution. Criticizes various viewpoints on the dangers of the profession, and points to the dangers of it not being legalized.
42	3	"The Death Penalty"	April 17, 2006	403
Argues against capital punishment, from pragmatic and moral viewpoints.
43	4	"Cryptozoology"	April 24, 2006	404
Concerning mythological creatures such as Bigfoot and the Loch Ness monster. Cites the belief and study of these creatures as motivated by money as it creates tourism and royalties from film and video distribution.
44	5	"Ground Zero"	May 1, 2006	405
About the dragging of feet and design mistakes by the LMDC in rebuilding at the World Trade Center site, the lack of family and public approved memorials to the 9/11 attacks, the impact on local business, and how the whole process has been co-opted by people out to make money. Comedian Gilbert Gottfried makes a guest appearance in this episode.
45	6	"Pet Love"	May 8, 2006	406
Concerns people obsessing about pets, anthropomorphizing pets, projecting their own feelings onto the pets, as seen in things like Neuticles and cat shows.
46	7	"Reparations"	May 15, 2006	407
Against indirect reparations, such as reparations for slavery to modern descendants of slaves, but in favor of reparations to people directly affected, such as surviving Japanese American internees.
47	8	"Manners"	May 22, 2006	408
Pro rational manners that make sense, such as for things regarding cleanliness and politeness, against arbitrary manners.
48	9	"Numbers"	May 29, 2006	409
How numbers in statistical surveys can be used to deceive and how one can be scammed.
49	10	"Abstinence"	June 5, 2006	410
Argues that abstinence-only sex education is ineffective and often misleading. Also looks at the healthiness of being sexually active. Features former United States Surgeon General Joycelyn Elders, who resigned after suggesting that masturbation be promoted as a means of preventing young people from engaging in riskier forms of sexual activity.

=== Season 5 (2007) ===
No. overall	No. in season	Title	Original release date	Prod. code
50	1	"Obesity"	March 22, 2007	501
Attacks claims of the emergence of an obesity epidemic and weight loss products. Investigates societal discrimination against the fat. Features National Association to Advance Fat Acceptance and Glenn A. Gaesser, a professor of exercise physiology of the University of Virginia.
51	2	"Wal-Mart"	March 29, 2007	502
Defends Wal-Mart against various criticisms, arguing that it creates jobs where there are none and that it is merely the end product of capitalism.
52	3	"Breast Hysteria"	April 5, 2007	503
Investigates societal attitudes towards women's breasts, supports public breast-feeding and recognizes flashing as free speech. They also are critical of breast cancer fundraisers.
53	4	"Detoxing"	April 12, 2007	504
Attacks various detoxification programs and asserts the actual health benefits of colonoscopies for people 50 years or older.
54	5	"Exorcism"	April 19, 2007	505
Skeptical commentary on the usefulness and scientific validity of exorcisms.
55	6	"Immigration"	April 26, 2007	506
Skeptical commentary on various "Minutemen" border patrol projects and the American government's plans to build a wall to keep illegal immigrants out.
56	7	"Handicap Parking"	May 3, 2007	507
Criticizes the Americans with Disabilities Act for attempting to legislate compassion, and points out the law's negative consequences. Argues that businesses will provide support for the disabled due to the desire for as much business as possible regardless of laws.
57	8	"Mount Rushmore"	May 10, 2007	508
Investigates the origins of Mount Rushmore and attempts to highlight the positive and negative aspects of patriotism.
58	9	"Nukes, Hybrids, and Lesbians"	May 17, 2007	509
Advocates the use of nuclear power, criticizes hybrid cars for impractical designs made to accommodate the hybrid engine, and follows lesbians on a blind date.
59	10	"Anger Management"	May 24, 2007	510
Attacks mainstream anger management programs in a facetiously angry manner, likening their purveyors to charlatans.

=== Season 6 (2008) ===
No. overall	No. in season	Title	Original release date	Prod. code
60	1	"War on Porn"	June 19, 2008	601
Opposes the movement to regulate pornography on the Internet and argues that it is attempting to restrict freedom of speech. Also rejects the notions that pornography can lead to addiction and aggression. Features profiles of XXXchurch and Brandi Love.
61	2	"New Age Medicine"	June 26, 2008	602
A skeptical look at New Age medicine, presenting evidence which suggests it does not work.
62	3	"NASA"	July 3, 2008	603
While greatly acknowledging the vast scientific and engineering contributions made by the administration, argues that private industry would better finance NASA instead of taxpayer money. Also argues against the agency sending a human mission to Mars due to the resources needed and the extreme dangers involved as well as the administration's history of mistakes of overseeing safety, but supports the notion of colonizing space someday.
63	4	"Dolphins"	July 10, 2008	604
Criticizes the New Age belief that dolphins possess evolutionary superiority, a unique "energy" and healing powers.
64	5	"Sleep, Inc."	July 17, 2008	605
Takes a critical view of sleep-related products.
65	6	"Being Green"	July 24, 2008	606
Attacks the concept of carbon credits as a method of profiting off guilt, and compares them to indulgences.
66	7	"Sensitivity Training"	July 31, 2008	607
Examines sensitivity training and its roots in political correctness.
67	8	"Stranger Danger"	August 7, 2008	608
Argues that a culture of fear has produced an excessive concern for child safety. Points out that children are usually harmed by people they already know quite well.
68	9	"World Peace"	August 14, 2008	609
Argues that the idea of utopian world peace is naïve and incompatible with human nature, but also argues against those who argue for deliberate aggression like preemptive war. Also criticizes the United Nations, and argues that free trade and economic interdependence are the best means to achieve peace.
69	10	"Good Ol' Days"	August 21, 2008	610
Criticizes cultural nostalgia as unrealistic and inaccurate when thought of as "better times".

=== Season 7 (2009) ===
No. overall	No. in season	Title	Original release date	Prod. code
70	1	"Orgasms"	June 25, 2009	701
Questions the notion that Americans are in need of bigger and better orgasms by meeting with the inventor of a $12,000 remote-control orgasm machine, taking a $300 lesson from a sex coach, and observing a demonstration on how to unleash one's inner erotic rock star.
71	2	"Astrology"	July 2, 2009	702
Discusses astrology as a pseudoscience.
72	3	"Video Games"	July 9, 2009	703
Questions the idea that video games lead to teen violence.
73	4	"The Apocalypse"	July 16, 2009	704
Ridicules the idea that the world will end on December 21, 2012.
74	5	"Lie Detectors"	July 23, 2009	705
Attacks the reliability of the polygraph for detecting lies, arguing that it merely determines the subject's nervousness.
75	6	"Organic Food"	July 30, 2009	706
Repudiates the idea that organic food has better nutrients, a smaller environmental impact, less harmful pesticides, and better taste than non-organic foods.
76	7	"Taxes"	August 6, 2009	707
Penn & Teller attack the tax system of the United States as complex and unfair. They visit the halls of Congress in search of a legislator willing to discuss America's tax system.
77	8	"Lawns"	August 13, 2009	708
Penn & Teller take on the lawn industry and visit a neighborhood where growing a certain type of grass is mandatory. They argue that large parts of America do not have the right climate for lawns, and thus should not be forced.
78	9	"Stress"	August 20, 2009	709
Penn & Teller explore the modern day view of stress and examine its legitimacy.
79	10	"The Vatican"	August 27, 2009	710
Penn & Teller discuss the Catholic Church and its involvement campaigning against homosexuality efforts, condom use, and in covering up sex abuse by its priests. They talk with Italian satirist Sabina Guzzanti, whom the Vatican attempted to punish for criticizing Pope Benedict XVI. This episode is not on the season 7 DVD, and it is no longer listed on the show's official website. At the Amaz!ng Meeting's 2012 conference, Penn noted that he was also confused as to why the episode was omitted from the DVD release, having learned of this fact at a recording of Opie and Anthony.

=== Season 8 (2010) ===
No. overall	No. in season	Title	Original release date	Prod. code
80	1	"Cheerleaders"	June 10, 2010	801
Argues that high school cheerleading should be classified as a sport to increase required safety measures due to its risks. Also discusses how the majority of competitions and cheerleading goods are managed by Varsity Brands Inc. and if cheerleading were to be declared a sport Varsity would have to forfeit managing competitions to an independent body creating significant conflicts of interest.
81	2	"Fast Food"	June 17, 2010	802
Argues that people should be free to choose to eat fast food and argues against a proposed soda tax as well as misconceptions about fast food and its eaters.
82	3	"Martial Arts"	June 24, 2010	803
Argues that martial arts do not provide real self-defense as they are typically portrayed and generally just boost confidence, and in fact may lead people to unintentionally break U.S. self-defense laws due to ignorance of said laws.
83	4	"Teen Sex"	July 1, 2010	804
Argues that people should not be worried about teens having sex, that sexting should not be a crime, and that parents would be better off educating kids about sex than trying to shield them from it. Supports gay-straight alliances in public schools. Features Judith Levine, the author of Harmful to Minors.
84	5	"Easy Money"	July 8, 2010	805
Argues that multi-level marketing schemes create more victims than participants making profits, and argues that they are nothing more than pyramid schemes, although they state that name does not explicitly apply.
85	6	"Area 51"	July 15, 2010	806
Argues that those who believe in alien technology at Area 51 are trying to find answers to secrets using non-scientific methods, and are finding "evidence" because that is what they want to see. Also argues that some of these people are just looking for social groups that share their passion for extraterrestrial life.
86	7	"Criminal Justice"	July 22, 2010	807
Argues that the American criminal justice system is on the decline because of over-zealous police officers and district attorneys who care more about winning or being proven right than justice. Also argues that some aspects of forensics are not good or fully realized science, in part due to the significant lack of formal peer review.
87	8	"Old People"	July 29, 2010	808
Argues that the stereotypes surrounding old people are inaccurate, including debunking several arguments from Maddox. Discusses voluntary euthanasia.
88	9	"Self-Esteem"	August 5, 2010	809
Argues that the public's obsession with improving one's self-esteem is ineffective and that those with high self-esteem will develop narcissism later in life.
89	10	"Vaccinations"	August 12, 2010	810
Provides proof that there is no link between childhood vaccinations and autism rates. Covers a controversial study claiming the link and an increase in autism awareness along with a broader definition being used around the same time.
