= Night Hunter (1996 film) =

- Directed by: Rick Jacobson
- Written by: William C. Martell
- Produced by: Ashok Amritraj
- Starring: Don Wilson; Maria Ford
- Cinematography: John B. Aronson
- Edited by: John Gilbert; Robert L. Goodman
- Music by: Terry Plumeri
- Release date: 1996
- Running time: 86 minutes
- Country: United States
- Language: English

Night Hunter is a 1996 direct-to-video action horror film directed by Rick Jacobson featuring a struggle between vampires and humans.

== Plot ==
Jack Cutter (Don "Dragon" Wilson) is the last in long line of vampire hunters. After killing a few vampires in one L.A. restaurant, he is chased both by police and by other vampires.

== Cast ==
- Don "The Dragon" Wilson as Jack Cutter
  - Christopher Aguilar as Young Jack Cutter
- Melanie Smith as Raimy Baker
- Nicholas Guest as Bruno Fischer
- Sid Sham as Sid O'Mack
- Cash Casey as Detective Browning
- Maria Ford as Tournier
- Ron Yuan as Hashimoto
- Michael Cavanaugh as Roy Ward
- Vince Murdocco as Curt Argento
- James Lew as Tom Cutter
- Marcus Aurelius as Detective Hooper
- Vincent Klyn as Sangster
- David "Shark" Fralick as Ulmer
- Sophia Crawford as Carmella
- Dena Rae Hayess as Mary Cutter
- Randy Crowder as Richard
- Fawn Reed as Chrissy
- Maurice Lamont as Pabst
- John Corcoran as Castle
- Jeanette O'Connor as Kendall
- Stephanie De La Cruz as Restaurant Hostess
