= Penn & Teller: Bullshit! =

Television series

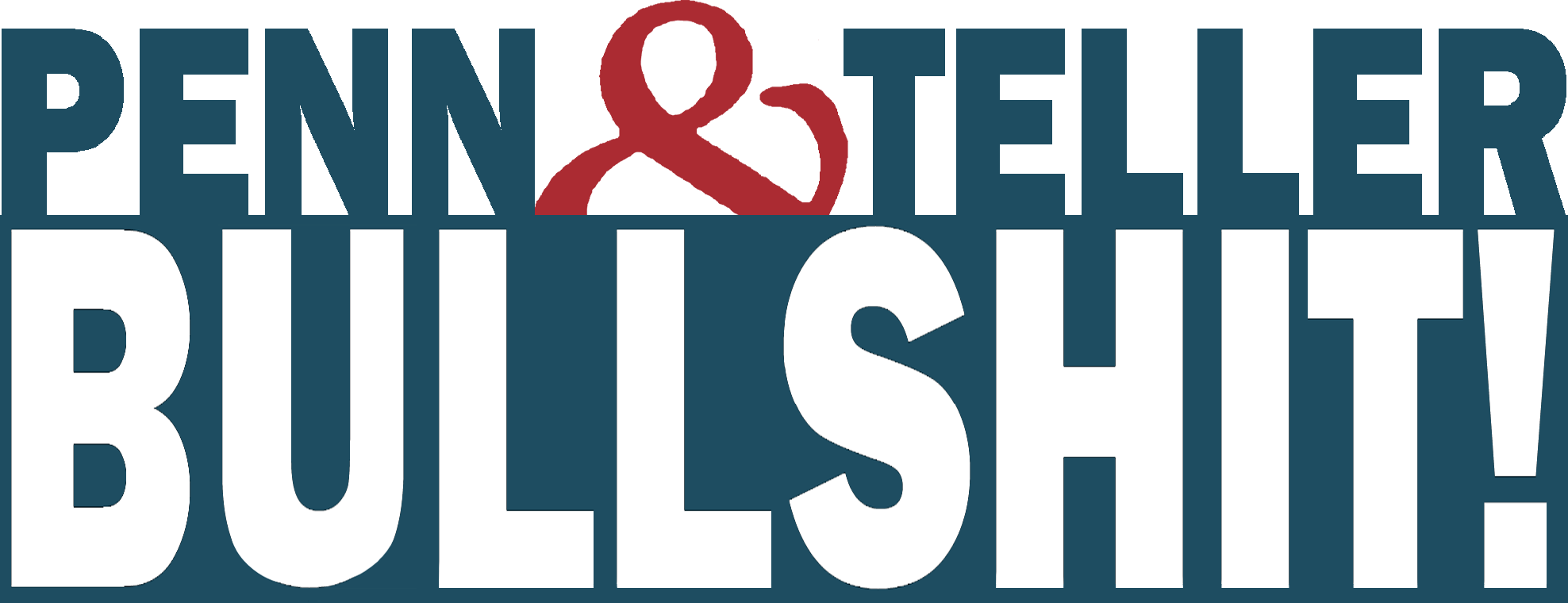
- Created by: Michael Goudeau; Eric Small
- Developed by: Michael Goudeau; Eric Small; Penn Jillette; Teller
- Presented by: Penn Jillette; Teller
- Country of origin: United States
- Original language: English
- No. of seasons: 8
- No. of episodes: 89 (list of episodes)

Production
- Executive producers: Peter Adam Golden; Star Price (2003–2006); Eric Small; Mark Wolper; Michael Goudeau; Penn Jillette; Teller
- Running time: 28–30 minutes
- Production companies: Penn & Teller; Star Price Productions; The Wolper Organization

Original release
- Network: Showtime
- Release: January 24, 2003 – August 12, 2010

Related
- Penn & Teller's Sin City Spectacular

Penn & Teller: Bullshit! is an American documentary comedy television series hosted by magician and political libertarian/skeptic duo Penn & Teller that aired from 2003 to 2010 on the premium cable channel Showtime.

== Overview ==
Penn & Teller: Bullshit! was hosted by professional magicians and skeptics Penn & Teller. Its format consisted of debating political topics, usually from a naturalist libertarian capitalist point of view (the political philosophy then espoused by both Penn and Teller) or aiming to debunk pseudoscientific ideas, paranormal beliefs, popular fads and misconceptions. The hosts criticize proponents of what they perceive as nonsense and dishonesty, often citing ulterior political or financial motives. In the first episode, Penn said the aim of the show is to "hunt down as many purveyors of bullshit as [they] can." As indicated by the show's title, the program adheres to Penn & Teller's characteristically blunt, aggressive presentation. The show was nominated for 13 Emmy Awards.

At the beginning of the first episode of the first season, Penn points out that the series will contain more obscenity and profanity than one would expect in a series dealing with scientific and critical inquiry, but explained that this was a legal tactic because, "if one calls people liars and quacks one can be sued... but 'assholes' is pretty safe. If we said it was all scams we could also be in trouble, but 'bullshit,' oddly, is safe. So forgive all the 'bullshit language', but we're trying to talk about the truth without spending the rest of our lives in court."

Paranormal subjects of episodes include alien abduction, alternative medicine, literal exegesis of the Bible, and extrasensory perception. Other episodes cover social issues, such as the war on drugs, organic food, animal rights, gun control, and environmentalism. Penn & Teller approach the topics in the manner of Harry Houdini and James Randi (the latter of whom made multiple appearances on the show), who were known for debunking claims of supernatural powers.

The show began airing its 8th and final season on June 10, 2010. As of its 7th season, it was Showtime's longest-running series. The series achieved worldwide success, and was shown in countries including Argentina, Australia, Bosnia and Herzegovina, Brazil, Canada, Colombia, Denmark, Finland, Iceland, Mexico, New Zealand, Norway, Republic of Ireland, Sweden, Venezuela and the United Kingdom.

== Episodes ==
The series premiered on January 24, 2003, and 89 episodes aired over the course of the series in the span of eight seasons, concluding on August 12, 2010.

Season	Episodes	Originally released	
Season	Episodes	First released	Last released
1	13	January 24, 2003	April 18, 2003
2	13	April 1, 2004	September 2, 2004
3	13	April 25, 2005	August 1, 2005
4	10	April 3, 2006	June 5, 2006
5	10	March 22, 2007	May 24, 2007
6	10	June 19, 2008	August 21, 2008
7	10	June 25, 2009	August 27, 2009
8	10	June 10, 2010	August 12, 2010

== Show format ==
In each episode, Penn and Teller debunk a chosen misconception such as cryptozoology, debate a controversial topic like gun control, or "expose the truths" of an organization like PETA. Sometimes their objective is not to completely dismiss the topic at hand but to decry certain aspects of the topic that they believe to be pernicious, misleading, unnecessary, or overemphasized. For example, in the case of college they argue that while college is a great place to learn, drink beer or train for a career, the concept of diversity is "bullshit" when used as an excuse to restrict free speech or selectively recruit to fill quotas. Or that "the casual asshole, or just plain dickhead, might do well in an anger management program" but teaching people they can relieve anger through attacking or screaming at inanimate objects is "bullshit", since this "venting" (as it's called in the industry) by an angry person in a social situation will lead to violence.

Proponents of the topic make their case in interviews; however, they often end up appearing fallacious or self-contradicting. For example, in "Safety Hysteria", a manufacturer of "radiation guards" for mobile phones admits that there is no proven link between mobile phone radiation and brain cancer, but assures viewers that "you can't be too safe" (mobile phones use conventional radio waves for communication, which are non-ionizing radiation). When he states his background is in advertising, not medical science, it is implied that he knows his product is useless but exploits people's fears to turn a profit. A second consecutive interview with another proponent is often started with the phrase: "And then there's this asshole..."

Penn Jillette has stated that those being interviewed know what show the interview is for and its purpose. One episode shows a video crew from the show going into a building to perform an interview, and Jillette points out that a member of the crew is wearing a Penn & Teller: Bullshit! baseball cap. Opponents are then interviewed and they offer rebuttals to the proponents' arguments. These are usually experts, celebrities, or sometimes speakers from the Center for Inquiry, the James Randi Educational Foundation, or the Cato Institute.

Penn and Teller often conduct informal experiments. For example, in the episode "Bottled Water", diners in an upscale restaurant are presented with a variety of apparently fancy bottled water brands. After the diners praise and pick a favorite, it is revealed that each bottle was filled by the same garden hose behind the restaurant. In one of their more serious experiments during the "Conspiracy Theories" episode, Teller fires a rifle at a melon wrapped in one-inch fiberglass tape to demonstrate that when a human head is shot, it is likely to be forced in the direction opposite to the bullet's trajectory. This demonstration was aimed at discrediting a John F. Kennedy conspiracy theory that points out that the fatal gunshot rocked Kennedy toward the shot through the use of simple principles of physics (i.e., "back and to the left", the fallacious belief that a shot from behind would cause a head to jerk forward is used as evidence that JFK must have been shot from the grassy knoll, in front of the vehicle). Penn and Teller look over the scene of the aftermath of the experiment to which Penn comments, "Second gunman my aching ass..."

Penn and Teller often have skits and stunts performed with them on set or use stock footage to combine reasonable arguments with straightforward, entertaining ridicule. For example, the "Sex, Sex, Sex" episode may be satirizing the media's obsession with sex appeal by having the hosts constantly surrounded by naked actors and actresses. Penn and Teller often close episodes with an impassioned ethical plea against whatever they are debunking, summarizing how this particular belief is harmful and should be resisted. The presenters distinguish between believers (often explaining that Penn and Teller themselves would like to believe these things are true, and showing compassion to the people who do think the things are true) and those they see as charlatans out for money or to advance a political agenda, at whom their anger is directed. For example, in their premiere episode, they debunk the idea that psychics can talk to the dead. While expressing the utmost sympathy towards people who are desperate for a chance to speak to a loved one who has died, they explain that charlatans take advantage of this love to get money from people, and deliver false messages that have nothing to do with the genuine character of the departed.

== Cancellation ==
During the October 31, 2010, episode of Penn Point, Penn alluded to Bullshit! no longer being on Showtime, saying "it's where Penn & Teller's Bullshit! used to be", while referring to Showtime.

In an interview published November 3, 2010, by the Atlantic City Weekly, Teller states, "We are in the process of making a decision to continue with Showtime or move on to a new show on Discovery Channel." In April 2011, Jillette announced on Twitter that Bullshit! had ended and the duo would appear in a new Discovery Channel series, originally titled Penn & Teller: Secrets of the Universe but ultimately airing as Penn & Teller Tell a Lie. On July 21, 2013, episode of Penn Jillette's podcast show Penn's Sunday School, he mentioned he would like to bring Bullshit! back, as he felt it was more important than ever, but Showtime's new management wanted a clean break and HBO would not associate with a previous Showtime show. He suggested Netflix as a possible return platform.

== Title ==
Since the show's title contains an obscenity (by common standards in the United States), the series is often listed in newspaper television listings there under the alternate title B.S. Some printings of the show's DVD releases also carry this alternate title. Dish Network and DirecTV list the show as Penn & Teller: Bulls...! Comcast Digital Cable lists the show as "Penn & Teller: Bull!" Netflix lists it as "Penn & Teller: Bullsh*t", while the iTunes Store lists "Penn & Teller: BS" (though one of its graphic icons for it has "BULL SH T" with Teller standing about where the I should be). Showtime's former website displayed the title "Penn and Teller".

In the "Profanity" episode, Penn tells the viewers that the planned title for Bullshit! was Humbug! This, Penn goes on to say, relates their skepticism (and TV show) to Harry Houdini's reactions to the popular misconceptions of his day; but the idea was scrapped because humbug had less of an impact than the more profane, more informal word, bullshit. It is also discussed during the profanity episode that humbug was considered as profane at one time as bullshit today. During that same episode, Penn and Teller themselves did not use any profanity, even changing the name of the show to Humbug! for that episode. At one point, Penn suggests the use of the phrase Jesus Christ! by a non-Christian is not profanity, but as Teller apparently drops a bowling ball on his foot just as he mentions the phrase, his yelling of the expression makes its use ambiguous. (See Wikiquote's transcription of the quote.)

When discussing Bullshit! on his radio show, Penn either broke the word in half, usually with a clap and a slight pause (Bulls[Clap]Hit), or change it to Bullshot. He frequently referred to how Criss Angel's show Mind Freak had "the perfect title, everyone knows what you mean and you can advertise", which they could not. On an episode of the public radio program Wait Wait... Don't Tell Me!, Penn referred to the show as Bushlit.

== Proposed topics ==
Plans to make an episode focusing on Scientology were believed to have been rejected by Showtime executives to avoid provoking legal action by the Church of Scientology, though Penn later revealed on his radio show that this was not true, commenting that he has slight interest in dealing with Scientologists despite being critical of their practices. Matt Stone and Trey Parker, friends of Penn and Teller, were motivated by this to create their own long-planned, controversial South Park episode lampooning Scientology, "Trapped in the Closet". Another planned episode on airport security has been rejected from every season's topic list: "It turns out, to shoot anything on airport security, you are violating federal law. You're not allowed to shoot anything there," said Penn. He has done radio, film and print regarding airport security, but has been unsuccessful adapting it for television.

During a Q&A session at The Amaz!ng Meeting of 2005, he said that the episode about conspiracy theories did not cover Holocaust denial, since it should have its own episode.

== Libertarianism ==
In addition to paranormal and pseudo-scientific claims, Penn & Teller take a skeptical view of government authority. In various episodes of their show, they have heavily criticized both the Internal Revenue Service and the Environmental Protection Agency, as well as taken stances against regulations or prohibitions on things such as guns, drugs, tobacco, prostitution, nuclear energy, nudity, and profanity. Penn & Teller are both H. L. Mencken research fellows with the Cato Institute, a libertarian think tank.

== Criticism ==
In the episode "Family Values", Penn acknowledged his and Teller's biases, saying, "We're fair and we never take people out of context. We're biased, but we try to be honest." Still, Dennis Cass of Slate magazine has criticized the duo for resorting to the same sensationalism as their targets, stating in a review of the series, "One of the unwritten rules for winning an argument against an inflammatory, irrational opponent is to calmly adhere to a loftier set of rhetorical standards. Penn and Teller showily throw this notion into the trash."

Noel Murray, in an otherwise favorable review for The A.V. Club, opined that Penn & Teller, despite being skeptics, are not dedicated to fact-based debunking or inquiry data retrieval, commenting:

Bullshit! isn't journalism, exactly. The show is one-sided by design: P&T's field interviewers rarely confront their subjects with the evidence against them, preferring to let the crackpots ramble on so that Jillette's voice-over rejoinders can score points without inciting a real argument.

At The Amaz!ng Meeting 3 Penn and Teller were asked about the evidence for their secondhand smoke episode being faulty. Penn Jillette, with Teller sitting at his side, said "What we talked about during the show was where the stuff was there", meaning that he was using the data that the government had when they instituted the ban, then said regarding this episode they were "very likely" wrong. Penn went on to describe "a new study that came out of England, just recently, that seems to have more stuff about it" and "right now, as I sit here, there probably is danger in secondhand smoke". He went on to say that this was a small portion of the program, and their main point was their opposition to "outlawing" smoking in privately owned businesses, which they still "stand behind 100%".

Robert Todd Carroll, author of The Skeptic's Dictionary, originally sided with the show's conclusion that there was no link between secondhand smoke and cancer. But Carroll changed his conclusions after further investigation into the studies. Carroll concluded that the studies cited by Penn and Teller were biased, and unbiased studies find secondhand smoke does cause disease.

During an interview on January 31, 2007, episode of The Skeptics' Guide to the Universe, Teller said that the final episode of the show would be about "the bullshit of Bullshit!" and would detail all the criticisms that they themselves had of the show; however, the series ended before such an episode could air.

== Awards and nominations ==
Penn & Teller: Bullshit was nominated for 21 awards, winning two. The Writers Guild of America bestowed an award upon the program in 2004 recognizing excellence in its writing quality, and it received an award from the Independent Investigations Group in 2008, recognizing the show's contribution to public understanding of scientific skepticism and rational thinking.

Through its run, Penn & Teller: Bullshit! garnered thirteen Primetime Emmy Award nominations, five Writers Guild of America Award nominations and a Directors Guild of America Award nomination.
