= Dance of the Damned =

- Theatrical film poster
- Directed by: Katt Shea
- Written by: Andy Ruben; Katt Shea
- Produced by: Andy Ruben
- Starring: Starr Andreeff; Cyril O'Reilly
- Cinematography: Phedon Papamichael
- Edited by: Carole Kravetz Aykanian
- Music by: Gary Stockdale
- Release date: 1989
- Running time: 82 min
- Country: United States
- Language: English

Dance of the Damned is a 1989 American film directed by Katt Shea and executive produced by Roger Corman.

== Cast ==
- Starr Andreeff as Jodi Hurtz
- Cyril O'Reilly as The Vampire
- Debbie Nassar as La Donna
- Maria Ford as Teacher
- Athena Worthy as Ray Gun Girl
- Tom Ruben as Cabby
- Chuck Rhee as Daniel

== Production ==
Katt Shea later recalled:

Corman wanted to use a strip club again and he had a haunted house set that he had left over from another film. So Andy Ruben and I came up with an idea to shoot in those two locations. Of course we changed the haunted house into this really modern, amazing, great house.

She wrote the script with Andy Ruben; in her comment: "It was always a process of including the elements Roger wanted into the script and story that Andy and I envisioned. We always had very high aspirations. Roger didn't discourage that, in fact I think he was proud of it, but he wanted to make sure his style of commercial elements were included".

Shea said Corman insisted the female lead be a stripper.

She added about casting:

It was really hard to find that vampire. In fact, Cyril came in so late I thought he was delivering a pizza to my house. It was really late at night and I thought 'God, we're never going to find a vampire' and he walked in. He was the first one auditioned who didn't sound like he was doing a stage play; and he didn't sound like he was doing a period piece or something either. He just talked like a real person and I said "Okay this is the guy!"

== Remakes ==
In 1993, the story was remade as To Sleep with a Vampire by executive producer Roger Corman. The film was directed by Adam Friedman and starred Scott Valentine and Charlie Spradling.

In 2011, Shea said that she wanted to remake her original film:

I've made it now into much more of a love story. I love the new script. I think the new script is much better than the old one. It's much more of a progression of two people over the course of a night who want to kill each other in the beginning. He's taking her to kill her later on and she's trying to kill him as well. Then, and over the course of the night they fall in love. They truly fall in love. He tries to save her at the end. He's trying to prevent himself from killing her. I think it's much more accessible.
