= Man versus Horse Marathon =

Sports event

The Man versus Horse Marathon is an annual race over 21 miles (34 km), where runners compete against riders on horseback through a mix of road, trail and mountainous terrain. The race, which is a shorter distance than an official marathon road race, takes place in the Welsh town of Llanwrtyd Wells every June. There are other Man versus Horse races — in Scotland based at Dores, near Loch Ness, in Central North Island, New Zealand and in the U.S. city of Prescott, Arizona.

== History ==
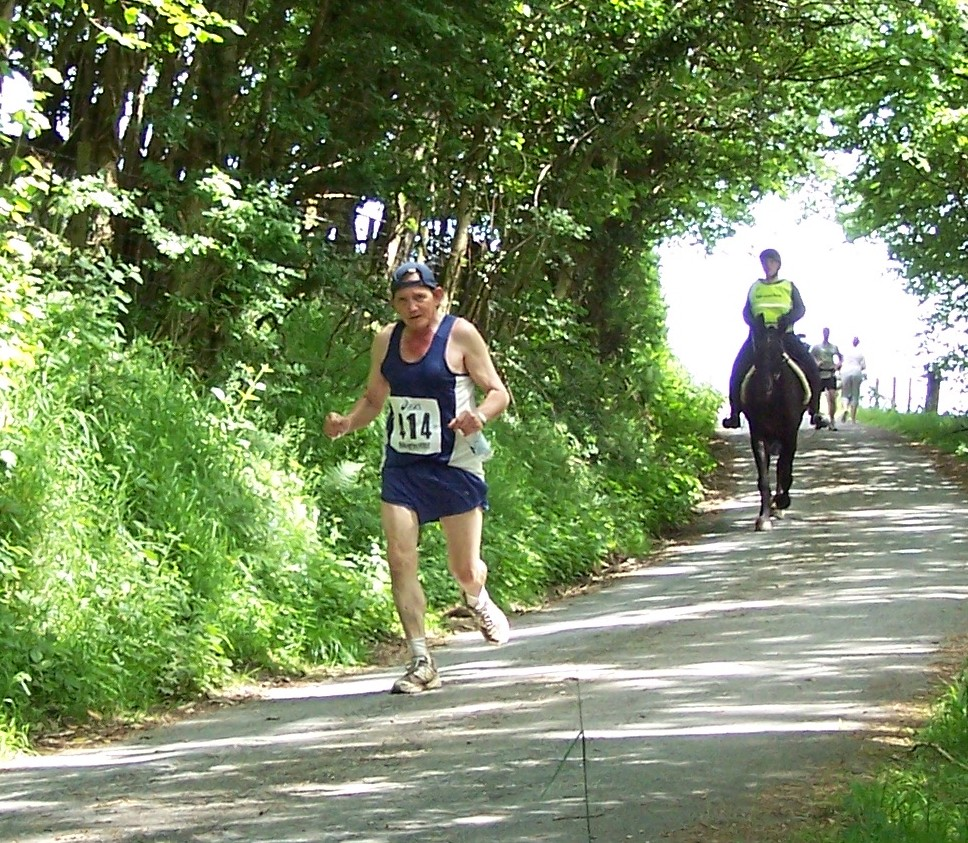
Competitors in the 2006 Man versus Horse Marathon

The event started in 1980, when local landlord Gordon Green overheard a discussion between two men in his pub, the Neuadd Arms. One man suggested that over a significant distance across country, man was equal to any horse. Green decided that the challenge should be tested in full public view, and organised the first event.

The annual race, over 21 miles (34 km), has runners competing against riders on horseback through a mix of road, trail and mountainous terrain. The race, which is a shorter distance than an official marathon road race, takes place in the Welsh town of Llanwrtyd Wells every June.

The first woman to run the race was Ann King in 1981. In 1982, the route of the course was amended slightly to give a more even match between the competitors. The course is slightly shorter than a traditional marathon at a reported 22 miles (35 km), but over rougher terrain. In 1985, cyclists were allowed to compete too – and that year, U.S. ladies' champion cyclist Jacquie Phelan narrowly lost to the first horse. In 1989, British cyclist Tim Gould beat the first horse by three minutes – the first time that a horse was beaten by a human in the race. Bicycles were allowed until 1993.

In 2004, the 25th race was won by Huw Lobb in 2 hours, 5 minutes and 19 seconds. It was the first time that a man racing on foot had won the race, thereby winning the prize fund of £25,000, which had been growing by £1,000 each year from the race's inception until claimed by a winning runner. The year's race also saw the highest ever number of competitors: 500 runners and 40 horses. The feat was repeated in 2007, when human competitors outpaced the first equine competitor by almost 11 minutes.

The 2009 race was marred by controversy when the organizers deducted time spent in the 'vet checks' from the horse times in addition to the 15 minutes for the delayed start of the horses. The deduction of this additional time enabled the horse to triumph by 8 minutes, instead of being defeated by 2. Whilst the organizers at the time claimed that the time spent in the vet check (which is not accurately monitored on a horse-by-horse basis) had always been deducted, this had not occurred in previous years. The fastest runner, Martin Cox, refused to accept the winner's trophy in protest at the decision. Following protests from other competitors, the organizers reverted to the previously followed rules of only deducting 15 minutes for the 2010 edition of the race. However, despite Haggai Chepkwony running the fastest time since Huw Lobb's record-breaking effort in 2004, a horse triumphed by 10 minutes. The 2011 event featured a number of very good riders and horses competing, and the wet track conditions favored horses over runners, but some very good times were recorded by the front runners. The winning rider was Beti Gordon riding Next in Line at Grangeway, while the top runner was Charlie Pearson from London.

The 2012 race saw the return of Huw Lobb, the first runner to have beat the horse (in 2004). Having come in third in the Cork Marathon just five days earlier, however, he ran considerably slower than his winning time eight years prior. In 2013, extensive forestry works meant the organizers had to modify the route considerably, resulting in a course of nearly 24 miles, instead of the usual route of just under 21 miles. Despite a very hot day, the longer and hillier course favoured the horses, with 2011 winner Beti Gordon comfortably beating the first man, Hugh Aggleton.

The 2013 race attracted an entry of 65 horses, with 44 completing the course, enabling it to lay claim to being "the world's largest horse race". Following a number of criticisms of the extended course in 2013 and 2014, the course for 2015 was shortened back towards 21 miles. This provided a more even match between man and equine, with Geoffrey Allen on Leo emerging victorious by just over 10 minutes from Hugh Aggleton. It was Allen's fourth outright win, and his fifth time as first horseman, having been beaten by Florian Holzinger in 2007.

== Winners ==
Note that the times are not necessarily comparable from year to year due to changes of the rules and the course layout.

Year	Winner	Fastest horse	Fastest horse time	Fastest runner	Fastest runner time	Time difference, horse vs. runner	Weather conditions	Going
1980	Horse	Glyn Jones on Solomon	1:27	Dic Evans	2:10	43:00	Unknown	Unknown
1981	Horse	Clive Powell on Sultan	2:02	Dic Evans	2:24	22:00	Unknown	Unknown
1982	Horse	Sue Thomas on Simon	2:06	Paul Brownson	2:10	4:00	Unknown	Unknown
1983	Horse	Ann Thomas on Nutmeg	1:26	Dic Evans	2:02	36:00	Unknown	Unknown
1984	Horse	William Jones on Solitaire	1:20	David Woodhead	2:05	45:00	Unknown	Unknown
1985	Horse	Nia Tudno-Jones on Jenny	1:40	David Woodhead	2:08	28:00	Unknown	Unknown
1986	Horse	Nia Tudno-Jones on Jenny	1:44	Fuselier Hughes	2:08	24:00	Unknown	Unknown
1987	Horse	Ray Jenkins on The Doid and Bill George on Mando	1:32	Paul Wheeler	1:57	25:00	Unknown	Unknown
1988	Horse	John Davies on Mavies	1:47	Mark Croasdale	2:08	21:00	Unknown	Unknown
1989	Horse	Ray Jenkins on The Doid	1:54	Mark Croasdale	2:10	16:00	Unknown	Unknown
1990	Horse	Ray Jenkins on The Doid and Chris Powell on Elkie	1:36	Glyn Williams	2:07	31:00	Unknown	Unknown
1991	Horse	Zoe Jennings on Hussar	1:30	Mark Croasdale	2:05	35:00	Unknown	Unknown
1992	Horse	Zoe Jennings on Hussar	1:38	Derek Green	2:09	31:00	Unknown	Unknown
1993	Horse	John Hudson on unknown	1:47	Robin Bergstrand	2:03	16:00	Unknown	Unknown
1994	Horse	Celia Tymons on Eskalabar	1:52	Mark Croasdale	2:09	17:00	Unknown	Unknown
1995	Horse	Ken Mapp on Ahmaar	1:57	Paul Cadwallader	2:06	9:00	Unknown	Unknown
1996	Horse	Ken Mapp on Ahmaar	1:57	Mark Palmer	2:12	15:00	Unknown	Unknown
1997	Horse	Megan Lewis on Silver Sea Gem	1:52	Paul Cadwallader	2:09	17:00	Unknown	Unknown
1998	Horse	Jackie Gilmour on Ruama	1:46	Stuart Major	2:16	30:00	Unknown	Unknown
1999	Horse	Jackie Gilmour on Ruama	1:58	Mark Palmer	2:16	18:00	Unknown	Unknown
2000	Horse	Heather Evans on Royal Mikado	2:08	Mark Croasdale	2:10	2:00	Unknown	Unknown
2001	Horse	Heather Evans on Royal Mikado	2:08:06	Martin Cox	2:17:17	9:11	Unknown	Unknown
2002	Horse	Robyn Petrie-Ritchie on Druimguiga Shemal	2:02:23	James McQueen	2:18:52	16:29	Unknown	Unknown
2003	Horse	Robyn Petrie-Ritchie on Druimguiga Shemal	2:02:01	Mark Croasdale	2:19:02	17:01	Unknown	Unknown
2004	Human	Zoe White on Kay Bee Jay	2:07:36	Huw Lobb	2:05:19	−2:17	Hot	Unknown
2005	Horse	Lise Cooke on Gifted Lady	2:19:11	Stephen Goulding	2:33:22	14:11	Unknown	Unknown
2006	Horse	Denise Meldrum on Tarran Bay	2:10:29	Haggai Chepkwony	2:19:06	8:37	Warm	Soft
2007	Human	Geoffrey Allen on Lucy	2:31:26	Florian Holzinger	2:20:30	−10:56	Hot	Good to firm
2008	Horse	Geoffrey Allen on Dukes Touch of Fun	2:18:13	John Macfarlane	2:18:43	0:30	Hot	Good to soft
2009	Horse	Geoffrey Allen on Dukes Touch of Fun	2:11:43	Martin Cox	2:20:02	8:19	Hot	Heavy
2010	Horse	Llinos Mair Jones on Sly Dai	2:07:04	Haggai Chepkwony	2:17:27	10:23	Hot	Good to soft
2011	Horse	Beti Gordon on Next in line at Grangeway	2:08:37	Charlie Pearson	2:25:45	17:08	Rain/sun/windy	Heavy
2012	Horse	Iola Evans on Rheidol Star	2:00:51	Huw Lobb	2:25:57	25:06	Cloudy	Very heavy
2013	Horse	Beti Gordon on Next in line at Grangeway	2:18:03	Hugh Aggleton	2:46:25	28:22	Hot	Good
2014	Horse	Geoffrey Allen on Leo	2:22:53	Jonathan Albon	2:42:49	19:56	Warm to hot	Good to soft
2015	Horse	Geoffrey Allen on Leo	2:20:46	Hugh Aggleton	2:30:35	9:49	Rain/warm	Good to soft
2016	Horse	Lindsey Walters on Deliva Crianza	2:17:58	Ross MacDonald	2:37:51	19:53	Cloudy and humid	Good, good to soft in places
2017	Horse	Iola Evans on Rheidol Petra	2:23:03	Owen Beilby	2:50:21	27:18	Rainy	Heavy
2018	Horse	Peter Davies on Ronnie	2:34:49	Joe Dale	2:35:12	0:23	Rain/sun	Soft
2019	Horse	Mark Adams on Woottonheath Herbie	2:18:51	Jack Wood	2:23:48	4:57	Cool	Soft to heavy
2020	Event not held due to COVID-19 pandemic							
2021	Event not held due to COVID-19 pandemic							
2022	Human	Kim Alman on Invictus	2:24:24	Ricky Lightfoot	2:22:33	−1:51	Warm	Good
2023	Human	Kate Atkinson on Dns Ronaldo	2:34:22	Daniel Connolly	2:24:38	−9:44	Sweltering	Good
2024	Horse	Georgina Silk on Merlon	2:37:45	Peter Taylor-Bray	2:48:22	10:37		
2025	Human	Gabi Morley on Gweni	2:35:45	Dewi Griffiths	2:23:54	−11:51		
2026	Horse	Rachel Lima on Zameel	2:31:37	Daniel Connolly	2:39:37	8:00		
