= Emery Emery =

American comedian, film producer, and author

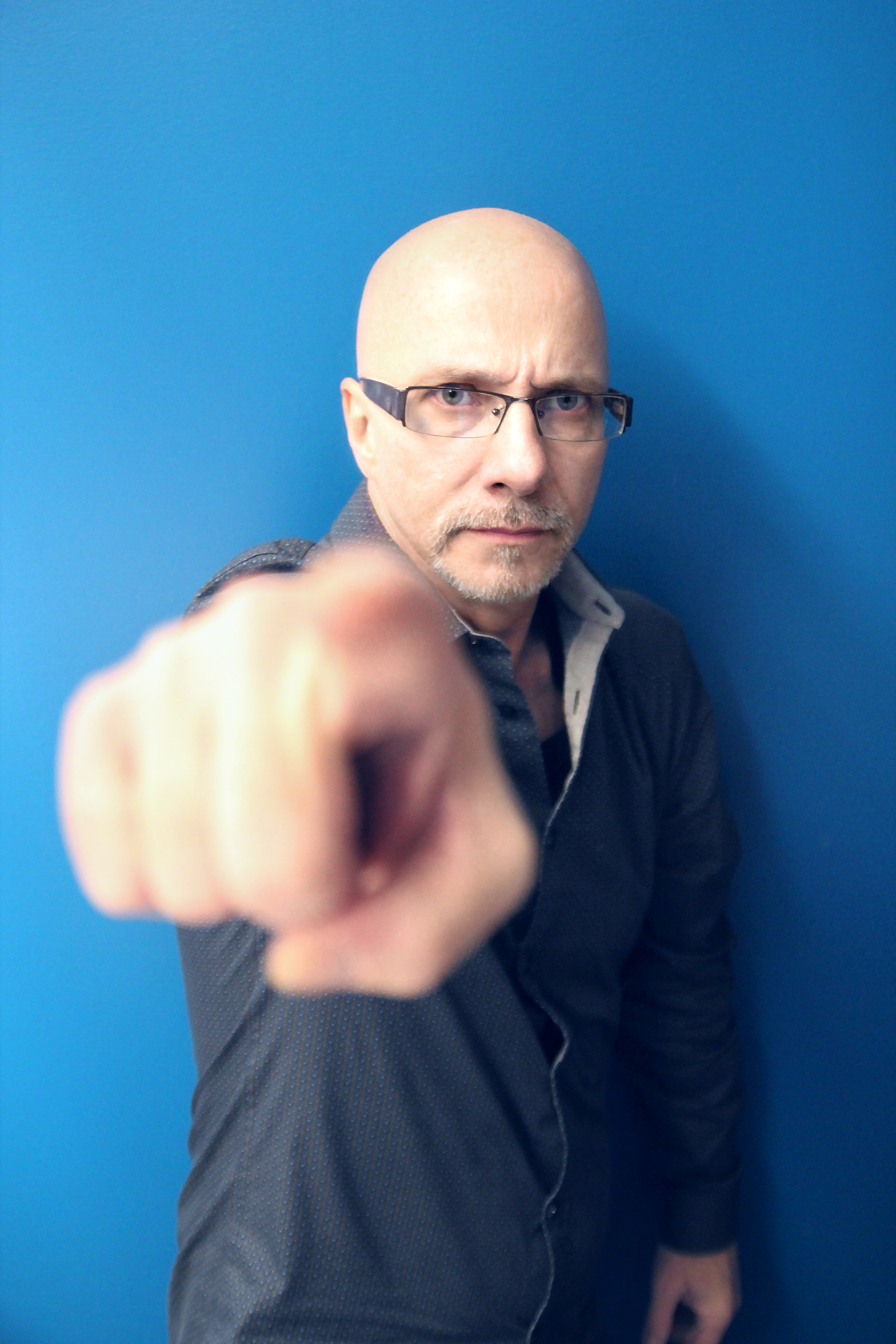
- January 2017
- Born: Emery Emery II; December 25, 1963 (age 62); Anaheim, California, U.S.
- Notable work: The Purveyor of Filth (CD), The Aristocrats (editor)

Comedy career
- Years active: 1981–present
- Genres: Dark comedy, Observational humor, Blue comedy, Political satire
- Emery Emery's voice Recorded in January 2014
- Website: www.emeryemery.com

Emery Emery (born December 25, 1963) is an American comedian, film editor and producer, and outspoken atheist, known for his contribution to numerous comedy-related films and TV shows, his two podcasts, Skeptically Yours, and the award-winning Ardent Atheist. Further, he has the distinction of being a contributor to The Atheist's Guide to Christmas, and the editor of the documentary The Aristocrats.

== Early life and comedy career ==
Emery was born Emery Emery II in Anaheim, California. His father was Emery Emery also, but later changed his name to Bob. Emery and his family moved to Kansas City when he was two. He got his start doing open-mic nights in 1981 in the Kansas City area, and got his first solo gig at the comedy club Stanford and Sons in 1984. Emery developed an act that was a blend of dark comedy and observational humor, which he said was inspired by Bill Hicks. He has also listed Sam Kinison and Lenny Bruce as key influences. Emery quickly gained local attention, and was featured in several articles in the Kansas City Star and the Olathe Daily News.

Emery moved to Costa Mesa in 1991, where he continued his comic career in various comedy clubs in Southern California. He expressed frustration with the state of comedy at the time, saying "There's no camaraderie.... There's no argument about what's right or wrong to do." Nonetheless, he continued to perform stand-up in California and around the country, and gained recognition, with news sources saying he "packs a wicked comic punch" and "pushes hard against the boundaries of good taste and manners." In 1995, he released a CD, The Purveyor of Filth, which included his stand-up routines and what he described as "prose in the form of spoken word." He noted that it had "been called everything from brilliant twisted ramblings to the sick scratchings of an obviously, sociopathic malcontent. Both are right."

In 1997, he moved back to Kansas City, and had a stint as the host of a radio show, Saturday Mornings with Emery Emery and Raine on KY 102 for nine months before moving to Los Angeles.

== Film career ==
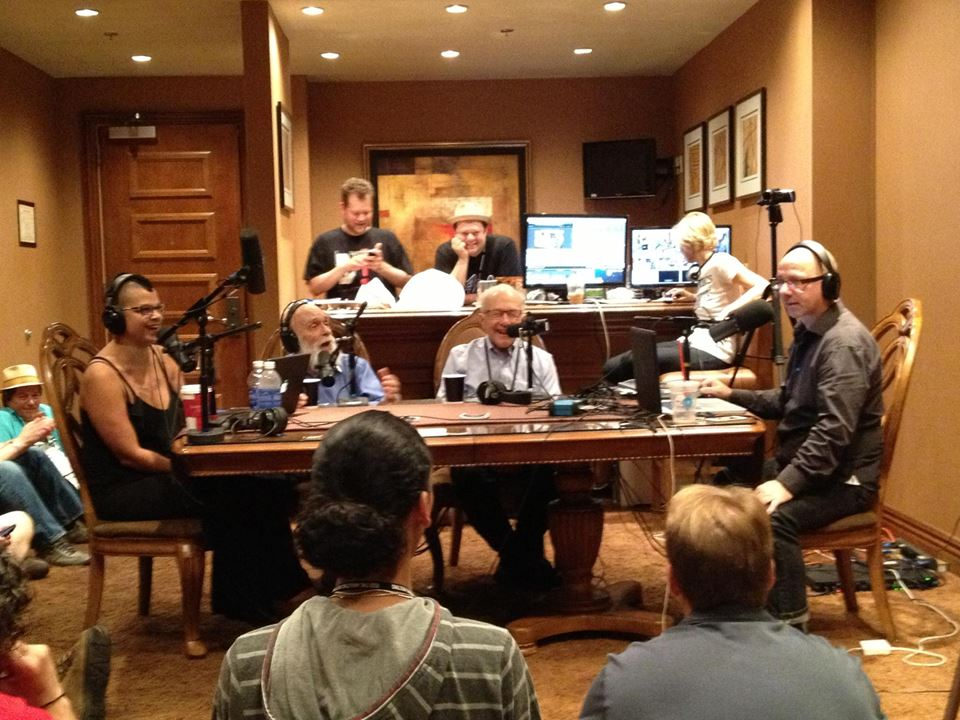
"Skeptically Yours" episode 49 with hosts, Emery Emery and Heather Henderson featuring James Randi and Ray Hyman taped at TAM 2013.

After moving back to California, Emery pursued a career as a film producer and editor in comedy-related films and TV shows. In 2005, he gained national attention as the editor of The Aristocrats, a documentary about the eponymous dirty joke as told by various comedians. In an interview, he said of the film "[t]he imagery and descriptions that appear in the film are far beyond offensive by conventional standards but not for the sake of shocking the viewer, but to entertain the entertainer. That is one very important point that The Aristocrats makes." His friend Paul Provenza, who directed the movie, praised Emery's editing work, crediting it with shaping the style and shape of the film. Emery in turn said in an interview "The Aristocrats was the film that put me on the map, so it holds a very special place in my heart. I feel I owe my entire career to the generosity of Paul Provenza and Penn Jillette."

His most recent editing project has been the TV movie House of Lies Live. Other projects in which Emery has worked in his capacity as an editor and/or producer include Teller's show Play Dead, which went to the Montreal Fantasia Film Festival, The Green Room with Paul Provenza, Chris Porter: Screaming from the Cosmos, Jake Johannsen: I Love You, Oslo: Burning the Bridge to Nowhere, and Heckler with Jamie Kennedy.

In October 2019, a special preview of the Skeptoid Media documentary, Science Friction, was shown at CSICon in Las Vegas. Through a series of interviews, the film addresses the issue of scientists and skeptics being misrepresented by the media. Directed by Emery and produced by Brian Dunning, release of the film is scheduled for 2020.

== Atheism ==
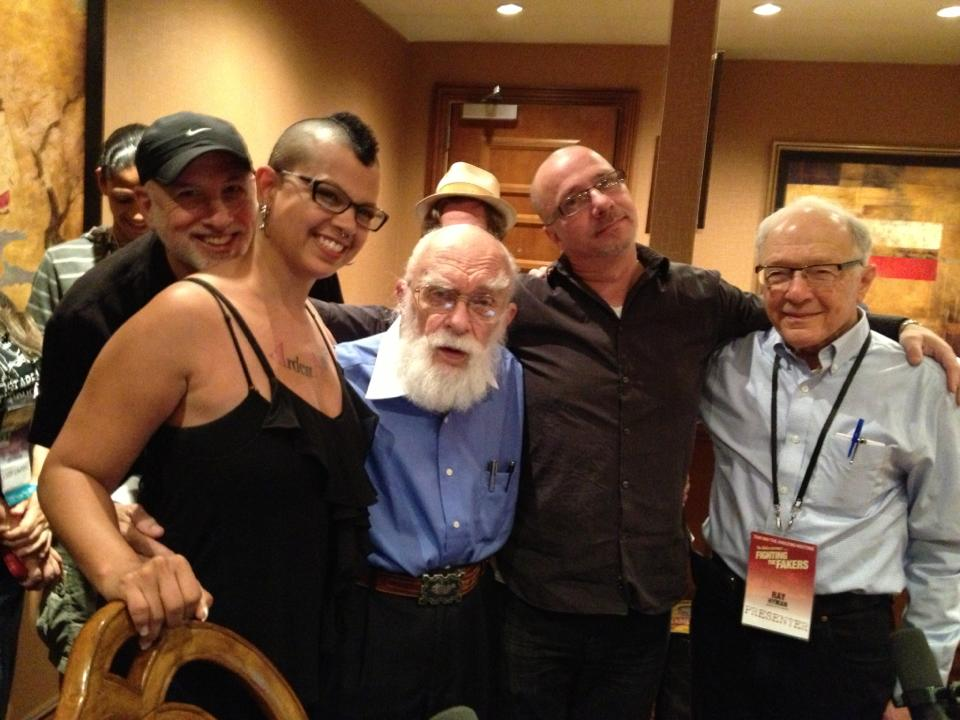
Participants in the "Skeptically Yours" podcast recorded at The Amazing Meeting for skeptics in 2013. Left to right: singer-songwriter Gary Stockdale, podcaster Heather Henderson, magician and meeting founder James Randi, Emery, and psychology professor Ray Hyman.

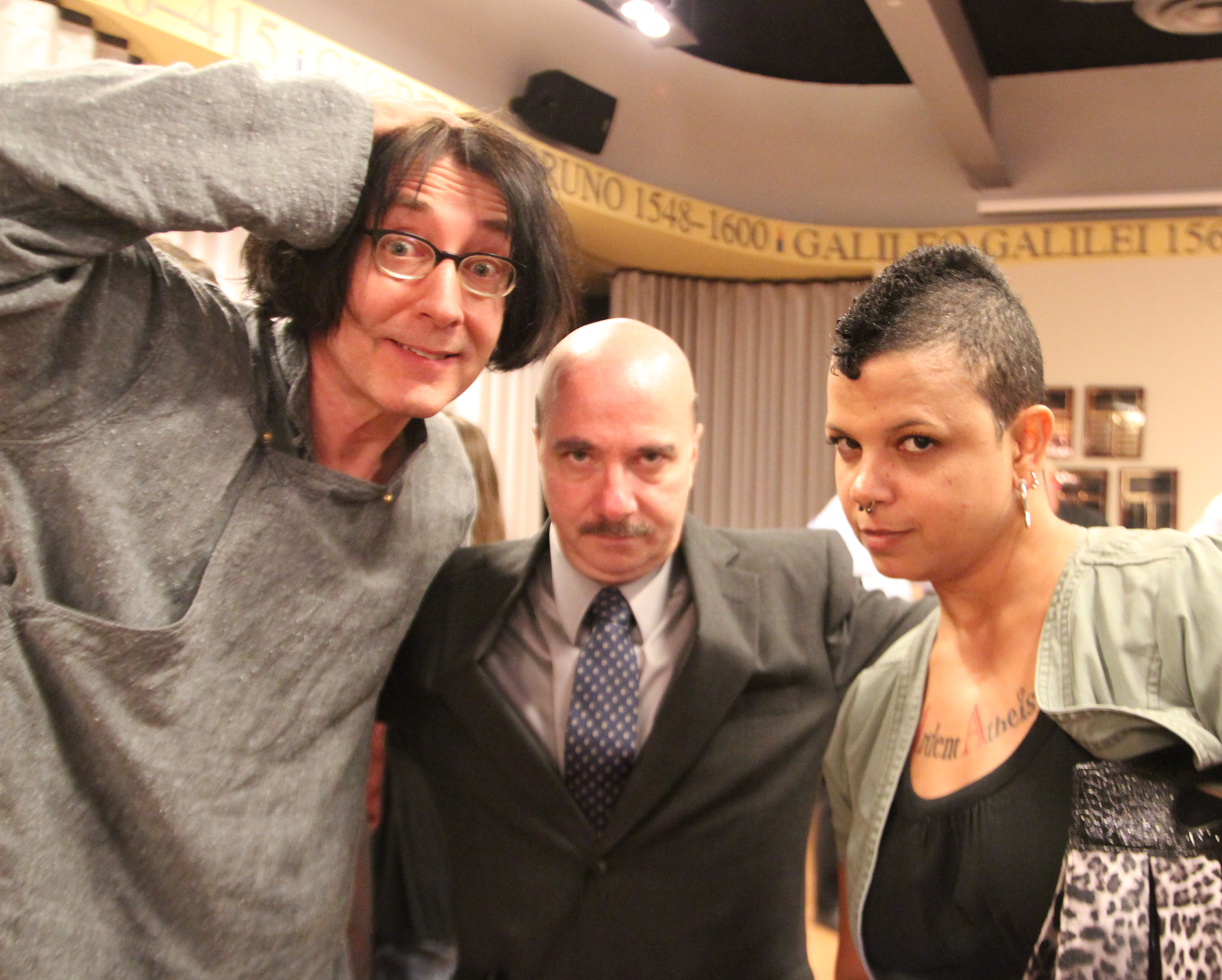
Emo Philips, Emery (dressed as Dr. Phil) and Heather Henderson at the 2012 IIG Awards.

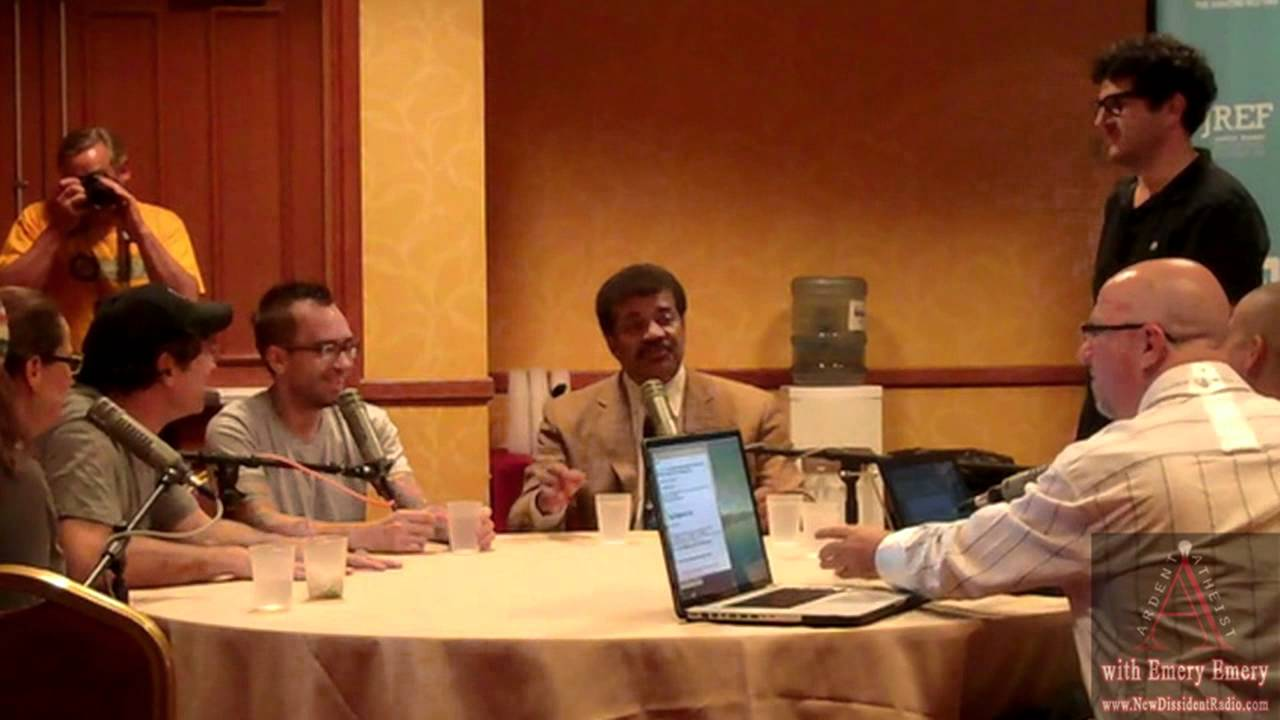
"Ardent Atheist" episode 25 with hosts, Emery Emery and Heather Henderson featuring Neil deGrasse Tyson, Jamie Kilstein, Paul Provenza and Kelly Carlin, taped at TAM 2012.

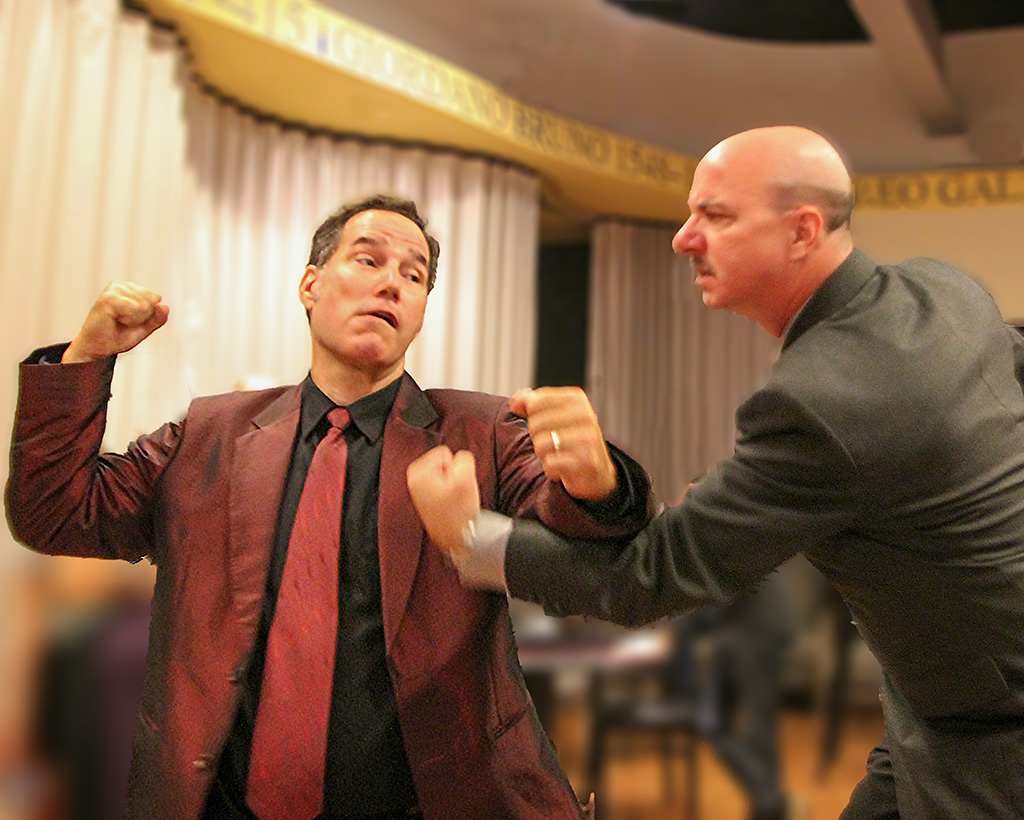
James Underdown and Emery (dressed as Dr. Phil) adversaries pretend to fight after the IIG awarded Dr. Phil The Truly Terrible Television Award (TTTA) in 2013.

Emery, an outspoken atheist, describes himself as "a former evangelical Christian [whose] religious studies, instead of bolstering his faith as he intended, led him to become a skeptic of all things woo." He started a podcast, the Ardent Atheist, in 2011, which won the 2012 Podcast Awards in the religion/inspiration category. He started a second podcast, Skeptically Yours, in 2012, and has had skeptic celebrities such as Ray Hyman, James Randi, and Jamy Ian Swiss as guests. In addition, he was a contributor to the book The Atheist's Guide to Christmas, and has been a regular presenter at the IIG awards.

In May 2013, comedian Doug Stanhope asked Emery to help raise money for an Indiegogo fundraiser he started for Rebecca Vitsmun, who lost her house in the 2013 Moore tornado. When CNN reporter Wolf Blitzer asked Vitsmun if she "thanked the Lord," she replied, "I'm actually an atheist." Emery sent out e-mails to 20 key celebrities in the atheist movement, and the fundraising effort quickly garnered support from Penn Jillette, the James Randi Educational Foundation, The American Humanist Association, American Atheists, The Richard Dawkins Foundation for Reason and Science, and Ricky Gervais. The fundraiser met its goal of $50,000 within 17 hours, but Stanhope decided to continue it until the July 23rd deadline. In the end, Vitsum received $125,760.

Emery has also indicated that he is interested in community-building with other atheists and non-religious, through organizations such as Sunday Assembly. He said in a piece by Becky Garrison that church for him was essentially getting together with like-minded people and building a community.
