= The Amazing Kreskin =

American mentalist (1935–2024)

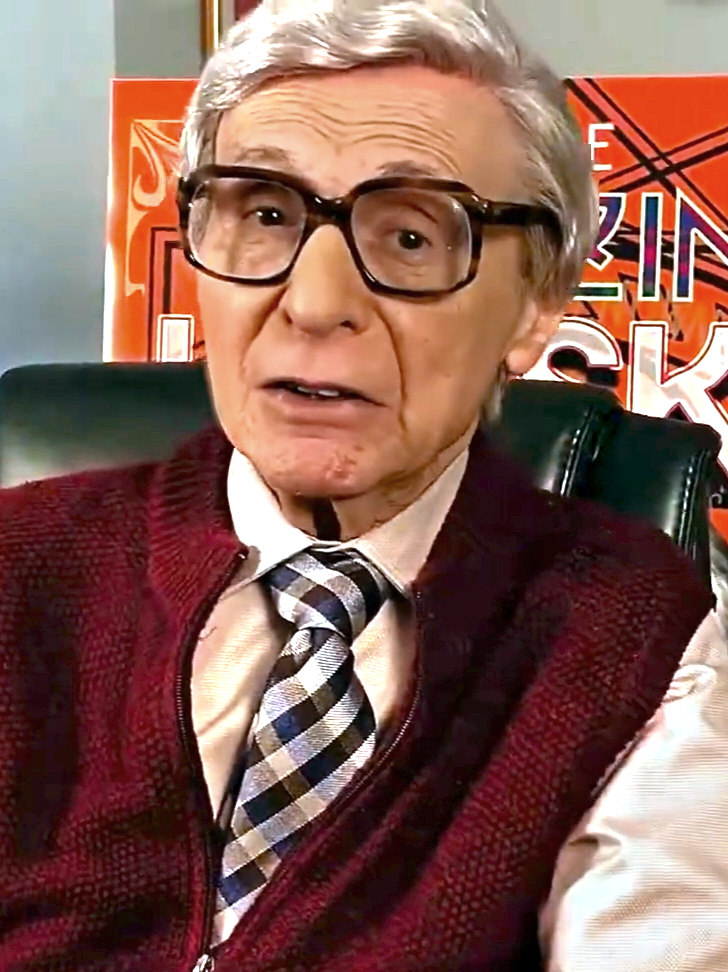
- Kreskin in 2020
- Born: George Joseph Kresge Jr. January 12, 1935; Montclair, New Jersey, U.S.
- Died: December 10, 2024 (aged 89); Wayne, New Jersey, U.S.
- Education: Seton Hall University (BA)
- Years active: 1964–2024
- Website: amazingkreskin.com (Archive)

The Amazing Kreskin (Note: Kreskin legally changed his name to The Amazing Kreskin later in life.) (born George Joseph Kresge Jr., January 12, 1935 – December 10, 2024), also known as Kreskin, was an American mentalist who became popular on television in the 1970s. He was inspired to become a mentalist by Lee Falk's comic strip Mandrake the Magician, which features a crime-fighting stage magician. He always presented himself as a mentalist, never as a psychic, who operated on the basis of suggestion, not the paranormal or supernatural.

== Early life and education ==
George Joseph Kresge Jr. was born on January 12, 1935, in Montclair, New Jersey, to a Polish father and Sicilian mother and grew up with his younger brother in West Caldwell, New Jersey, where he would reside for most of his life. His father worked for a battery manufacturer. Kreskin attended Seton Hall University, earning a degree in psychology. He worked for several years as a clinical psychologist while developing his act.

== Career ==
From 1972 to 1975, Kreskin's television series The Amazing World of Kreskin was broadcast throughout Canada on CTV and distributed in syndication in the United States. It was produced in Ottawa, Ontario, at the CJOH-TV studios. An additional set of episodes was produced from 1975 to 1978 at the studios of CFTO-TV in Toronto, billed as The New Kreskin Show.

His first television appearance was on The Steve Allen Show in 1964. He went on to appear approximately 100 times on each of The Mike Douglas Show and The Merv Griffin Show and 88 times on The Tonight Show Starring Johnny Carson. It was Carson who gave him the moniker "The Amazing Kreskin". Kreskin claimed that his first appearance on the Steve Allen Show, during which he tripped when blinded by stage lights, inspired Carson to create the character Carnac the Magnificent who would habitually stumble on his way to the Tonight Show desk. However, multiple sources have indicated that Carson was actually inspired by Steve Allen’s “Answer Man” routine.

In the 1980s and 1990s, Kreskin came to prominence again through several appearances on Late Night with David Letterman and The Howard Stern Show as well as around 100 appearances on Live with Regis and Kathie Lee (now Live with Kelly and Mark).

In 2009, he became the first guest to make four appearances on Late Night with Jimmy Fallon.

Though Kreskin made "predictions", he did not claim to have paranormal or clairvoyant powers, and did not like to be considered a "psychic". One of his best known tricks was to find his own paycheck for his current performance. If he did not find it, he did not get paid for that day. He would instruct the audience to hide an envelope containing the check, while he was escorted off stage and into seclusion by other members of the audience. He then re-emerged and hunted through the audience, almost always being able to ferret out the correct location.

According to Kreskin, he failed only ten or eleven times, including his performance at Rockwell's in the Village of Pelham, where he needed two attempts and a "rehide" of the check with an additional two attempts at finding the check or note. On April 14, 2018, Kreskin failed to find the hidden check while performing to a sold-out crowd in Theatre Row, New York City on 42nd Street. After about 30 minutes of leading viewers around the small theater trying to find the check, Kreskin settled his search on an area behind the stage, out of view of most of the audience. The check was hidden within the general area. His efforts were in vain however, as perhaps eight to ten minutes later he threw up his hands and declared he had failed at the trick for the 12th time in 30 years.

Kreskin had stated that he taught classes for law enforcement groups, which "focus[ed] on psychological methods such as jogging lost memories through relaxation techniques or detecting lies through body language and voice inflections". However, to date, no law enforcement organization has acknowledged his involvement in resolving criminal cases.

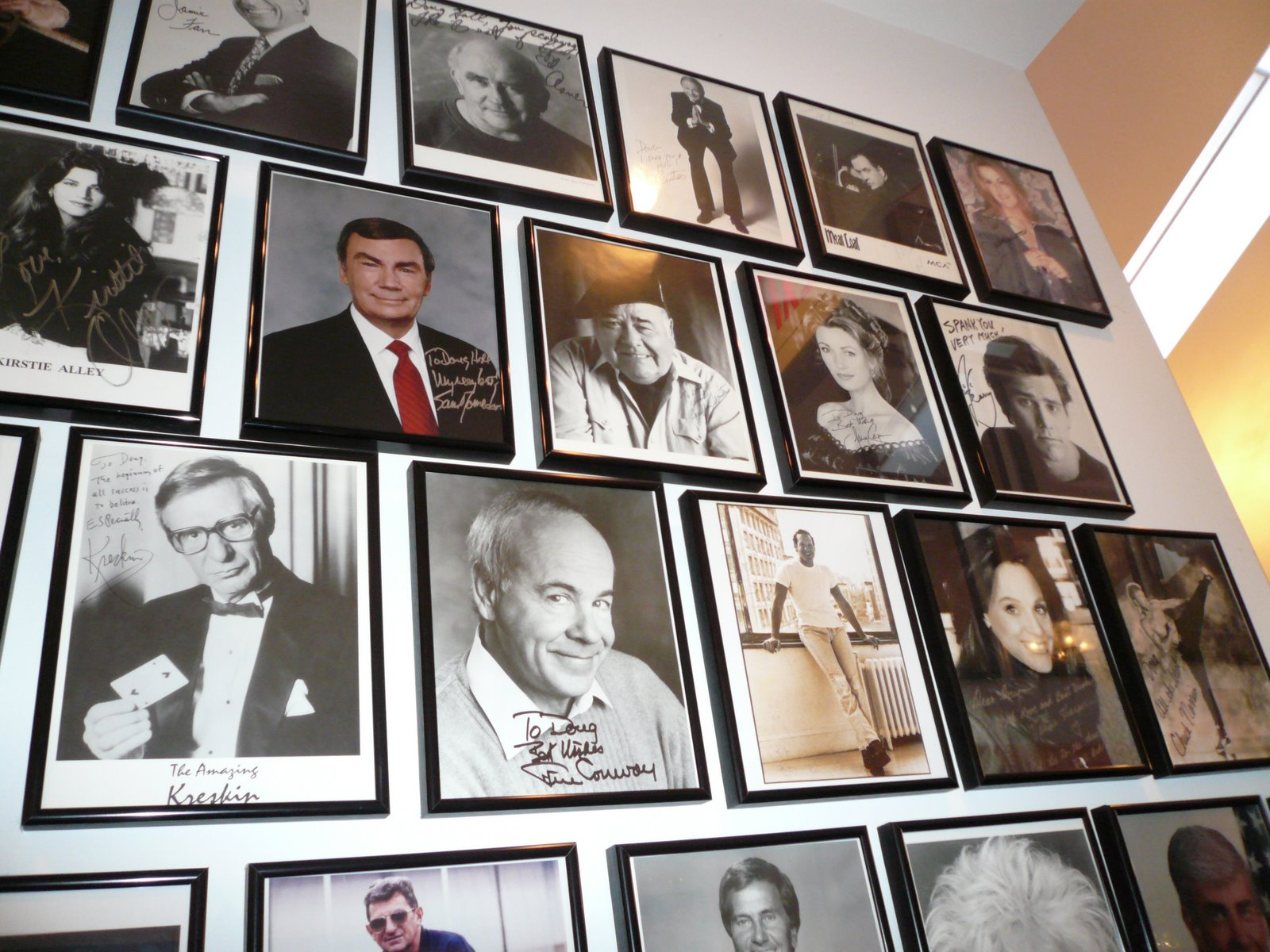
Kreskin's portrait (bottom left), among others, at the Eureka! Ranch in Newtown, Ohio, in 2007

The 2008 movie The Great Buck Howard is based on the experiences of writer-director Sean McGinly, who worked briefly as Kreskin's road manager.

On January 31, 2022, it was announced that Kreskin would provide the voice of The Magic Tree in a new animated series called The Adventures of Little Billy: In Search of the Magic Tree, based on a book of the same name by Barry J. Farber.

In September 2022, after Hugh Neutron became a playable character for Nickelodeon All-Star Brawl, Mark DeCarlo, the voice actor of Hugh Neutron, wrote on Twitter that he wanted Jimmy Neutron and Kreskin to also be added to the game's roster. Afterwards, Kreskin posted a video on Twitter saying that he would accept if he was brought into the game. In July 2023, when the trailer of Nickelodeon All-Star Brawl 2 was released and Jimmy Neutron was confirmed to be in the sequel, Kreskin released another video saying that he was still interested in being in this game.

Kreskin's popularity peaked in the 1970s and early 1980s, though he continued to perform into the 2020s. He appeared regularly on WPIX in New York City, and annually on both the Fox News Channel and CNN to give his New Year's Day predictions for the coming year. Kreskin's last television appearance was on Fox Business on May 2, 2023, predicting the Super Bowl, and his last scheduled performance was on March 7, 2024, a "pendulum seminar" on Zoom.

In his final years, Kreskin dedicated much of his time to uploading videos on YouTube, where he frequently shared personal reflections, commentary, and reviews. Among his movie reviews were Leave the World Behind, The Sixth Sense, Morbius, Jimmy Neutron: Boy Genius, Hacksaw Ridge, and The Prestige, which became the last film review he recorded. He also discussed then-current events and pop culture topics, such as the recasting of Rick and Morty characters, the episode “That’s Amorte” from Rick and Morty, Jack Black’s viral song “Peaches,” the entry of Mickey Mouse into the public domain and its subsequent use in horror films, the Verbalase controversy and the $50,000 Hide Away cartoon featuring Charlie Morningstar from Hazbin Hotel, as well as the 2023 mass shooting in Lewiston, Maine, in which Kreskin predicted the suicide of the suspect, Robert Card, only hours before news outlets confirmed it had occurred. He also spoke candidly about his own personal experiences, including a fall from a chair that fractured his humerus bone near the shoulder. His final video was a short animated clip featuring Kreskin with cats and frogs celebrating Leap Day.

Kreskin grew up in West Caldwell, New Jersey, and was a longtime resident of suburban North Caldwell and Caldwell, New Jersey. He had no children and never married.

== Health and death ==
Kreskin performed into his 80s, until a few months prior to his death. He stopped performing after being injured in early 2024, when he fell off a chair in his home while attempting to inspect a string or wire hanging from his ceiling. The fall led to health complications, and he experienced a period of poor health in the weeks leading up to his death.

Kreskin died from complications of dementia at an assisted living facility in Wayne, New Jersey, on December 10, 2024, at the age of 89.

He is buried at Gate of Heaven Cemetery in East Hanover, New Jersey with a gravestone that he notably had purchased and built in advance before his death.

== Criticism ==
Throughout his career, Kreskin has made a number of public claims that have been widely disputed or debunked, leading some critics to accuse him of embellishing stories to enhance his persona.

In 2002, Kreskin made a prediction that there would be a mass UFO sighting over Las Vegas on June 6 between the hours of 9:45 PM and midnight that would be witnessed by thousands of people. He also said that if there were no sighting, he would donate $50,000 to a charity. Hundreds of people camped out that evening, yet no sighting occurred. On June 8, Kreskin appeared in the opening segment of the Coast to Coast AM radio show, hosted by Art Bell, to explain what had happened.

Bell read Kreskin's press release over the air to the effect that "the sighting prediction was a total fabrication in order to prove people's susceptibility to suggestion post-9/11". Kreskin claimed he was concerned that a terrorist, with the skills of a mentalist such as himself, could pull a similar stunt involving something much worse. He stated that the predicted sighting was only an "experiment". When asked about the $50,000 donation he previously promoted, Kreskin claimed there was indeed a sighting that night since he said glowing green orbs were supposedly spotted in the sky just before midnight and reported by witnesses after news camera crews had already left the scene.

Because of this one reported sighting, Kreskin said his prediction came true anyway and therefore he did not have to pay the money he previously announced. This statement offended Art Bell, who opined that this was merely a publicity stunt on Kreskin's part, and officially banned Kreskin from his show.

Kreskin had repeatedly stated that he was the inspiration for Johnny Carson’s comedic character Carnac the Magnificent, which featured regularly on The Tonight Show. Kreskin stated that Carson developed the character after seeing him trip onstage during a 1964 television appearance, mimicking both his physical entrance and mentalist persona. However, television historians have consistently traced the Carnac character's origins to earlier comedy routines such as Steve Allen’s "Answer Man" and radio skits dating back to the 1950's. Neither Carson nor his writing staff ever credited Kreskin as an influence.

Kreskin also frequently recounted an anecdote in which he missed a doomed commercial flight from Newark to Lake Placid, claiming that the plane later crashed but his luggage, having been loaded onto the aircraft, survived. According to the story, police officers returned the luggage to him during one of his performances. However, researchers and journalists have found no record of a plane crash matching this description, and no public confirmation exists of law enforcement returning any belongings to Kreskin onstage. The story appears to originate solely from his own accounts with no independent verification.

Kreskin claimed on several occasions to have assisted in solving crimes or locating missing persons using his mentalist abilities. However, no law enforcement agencies have officially credited him with contributing to the resolution of any criminal investigations. These claims, often made in interviews or promotional appearances, have been criticized by skeptics and professional magicians for lacking credible support.

Magician and skeptic Penn Jillette, best known as half of the duo, Penn & Teller, has been one of Kreskin's most outspoken critics. In a 1992 letter to Skeptical Inquirer, Jillette recounted how, as a child, he was misled by Kreskin's television appearances and by the "ESP kit" that Kreskin marketed to children. Jillette wrote, "Kreskin just stole money from my parents, and time and passion from me. I owe him no thanks," and described feeling "humiliated and betrayed" upon realizing Kreskin was performing tricks rather than scientific experiments.

Jillette revisited this criticism in his 2011 book God, No!, in a chapter titled "Maybe That Thief Kreskin Will Sue Me This Time", where he recounts attending one of Kreskin’s performances at the Debbie Reynolds Casino in Las Vegas. Jillette expressed frustration that Kreskin's act, marketed with a sense of authenticity, relied entirely on illusion. Jillette even considered reaching out to his friend Carrie Fisher (Reynolds' daughter) to try to get the show canceled.

In a 2020 appearance on The Tim Ferriss Show podcast, Jillette again criticized Kreskin, calling him "a hack" and stating that Kreskin's presentation of ESP tricks as genuine phenomena caused Jillette to "hate science and magic" for a time in his youth.

In January 1973, TV Times of Hong Kong carried an interview with Kreskin in which he alluded to the possibility of this stunt—and to the dangers of the madness of crowds in general:

Kreskin is aware of both the benefits and dangers of hypnotism and claims that given an audience of 200 people, "I'll have them seeing flying saucers. Take the same crowd to Times Square on a hot evening and you can have them screaming 'fire'."

Kreskin says Hitler used hypnotic techniques in his speeches—the torchlight parades and the sombre drum beating being evidence of this.

"Using suggestion, I could never make someone do something he didn't want to do. But it's different in a crowd," says Kreskin. "Psychologists don't know why, but somehow the level of morality is lowered and responsibility is lost."

== Works ==
- Kreskin's ESP Booklet, Milton Bradley (1967)
- Kreskin's Krystal Booklet, 3M Company (1971)
- The Amazing World of Kreskin, Random House (1973)
- Kreskin's Mind Power Book, McGraw Hill (1977)
- Kreskin's Fun Way to Mind Expansion, Doubleday (1984)
- Secrets of the Amazing Kreskin, Prometheus Books (1991)
- The Protection Report by Kreskin, pamphlet, GF International Group (1992)
- Kreskin's Super Secrets, booklet, GF International Group (1993)
- How to Be a Fake Kreskin, St. Martin's Press (1996)
- The Pendulum & Lifelong Enrichment, Response Advertising (2000)
- The Amazing Kreskin's Future with the Stars, Meyerbooks (2001)
- Mental Power Is Real, Fitness Factory (2006)
- Four-Hour Miracle Direct, Response Advertising (2008)
- Kreskin Confidential, Author House (2009)
- Conversations with Kreskin by The Amazing Kreskin & Michael McCarty, Team Kreskin Productions, LLC (2012)
- In Real Time, Thane & Prime (2015)
