= Heather Henderson =

American burlesque artist and podcaster (born 1973)

Heather Anne Henderson
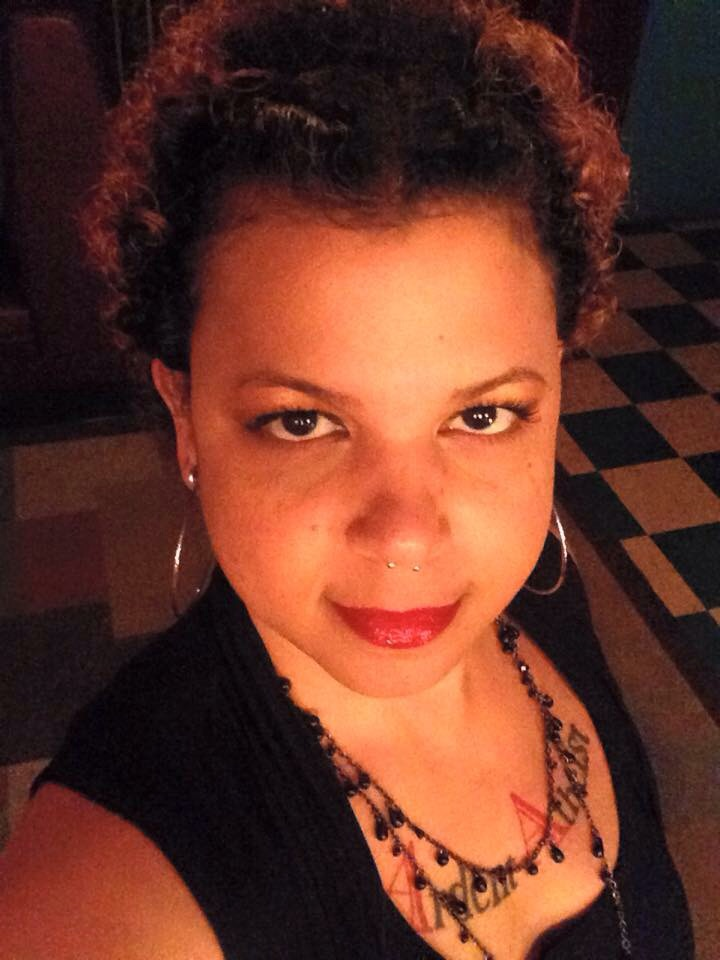
- Henderson in 2015
- Born: March 7, 1973 (age 53); Camden, New Jersey U.S.
- Other name: Baby Heather
- Occupations: Burlesque artist, podcaster
- Years active: 1974–present
- Known for: co-host of Skeptically Yours and Ardent Atheist podcasts
- Heather Henderson's voice Recorded May 2015
- Website: hhenderson.com

Heather Henderson (born March 7, 1973) is a professional burlesque dancer and podcast host who uses the stage name Baby Heather. She is an advocate for skeptical inquiry and atheism and won the 2012 People's Choice Podcast Awards in the religion/inspiration category for her Ardent Atheist podcast. From 1989 to 1991, Henderson was a regular performer on the Dance Party USA television show.

== Early life ==
Henderson was born on March 7, 1973, in Camden, New Jersey. Her mother was a Hungarian Jew. When Henderson was 10, in 1983, her father left the home. She attended Camden City Public Schools. She describes herself as a "shy and quiet girl" who did not talk back and believed everything her mother told her.

At age fifteen, she appeared on a nationwide teen dance show called Dance Party USA. She appeared on the show regularly for three years and went by the nickname Baby Heather. When Henderson's mother became involved with Jews for Jesus, they started attending progressive Christian churches, making Henderson very uncomfortable. As soon as she was old enough, Henderson told her mother she would not attend church again.

In 2011, Henderson moved to Los Angeles with friends. In order to raise money to purchase a plane ticket, she organized a fundraiser for herself with burlesque friends who donated their talent for a one-night show.

== Film and television ==
Henderson was a regular dancer on the local television show Dancin' on Air and the nationally televised Dance Party USA from 1989 to 1991. In her last year, she became a co-host. Henderson has also appeared on Sesame Street, Nickelodeon's Double Dare, in the film Mannequin Two: On the Move, and on Disney's Annapolis.

== Music and recording career ==
In her teens, Henderson released a single called "Give It Up" using her Dance Party nickname “Baby Heather.” Billboard gave the single a positive review.

Henderson played with Penn Jillette's No God Band in 2011.

== Burlesque career ==
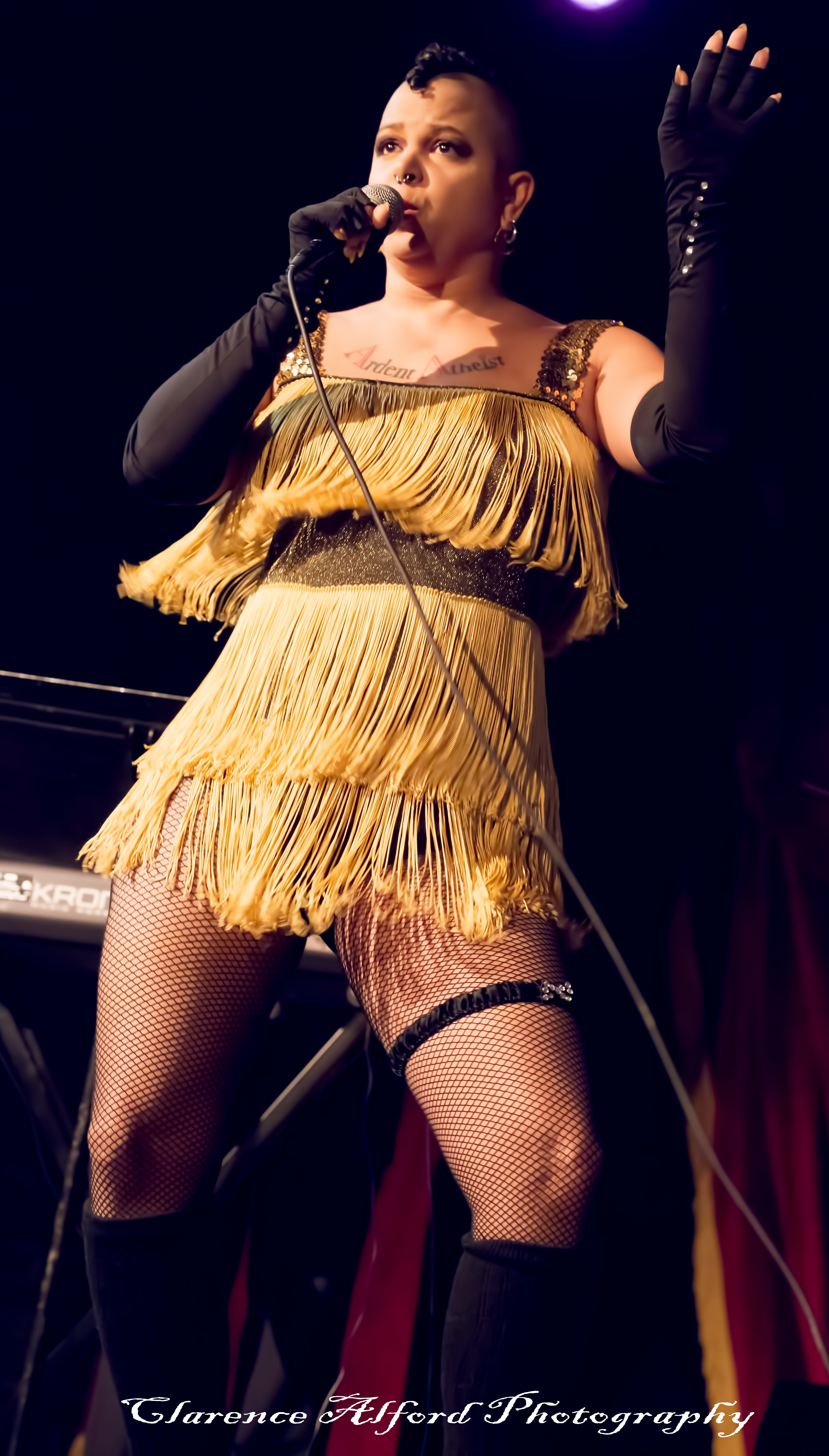
Hollywood Burlesque Festival December 6, 2013

Henderson worked from 1993 to 2010 in the erotica industry, doing stripping, burlesque, foot fetish parties, dominatrix work, and lap dancing. Henderson got involved with burlesque after a friend who was doing a "variety" show asked her to sing background.

She left burlesque in 2010. In 2013, Henderson returned to perform at the first Hollywood Burlesque Festival. Time Out Los Angeles listed her as one of the "Best Burlesque" performers and called her "the singing emcee with 'ferocious vocals.'"

== Film making ==
Henderson filmed several short fetish videos. Inspired by friend Norm Walker, her film PODONUTS features Walker eating cream-filled donuts off the feet of women (one of which is Henderson). Philadelphia Weekly states it "routinely wins over even the most squeamish spectators with its sex-positive message and thrillingly syncopated movement sequences.".

Henderson's 2009 film Marcella and Sofia, a fetish film about a young couple being sexually corrupted by two female captors (one of which is Henderson), won a Claw Award for best cinematography from the Terror Film Festival.

== Podcasts ==
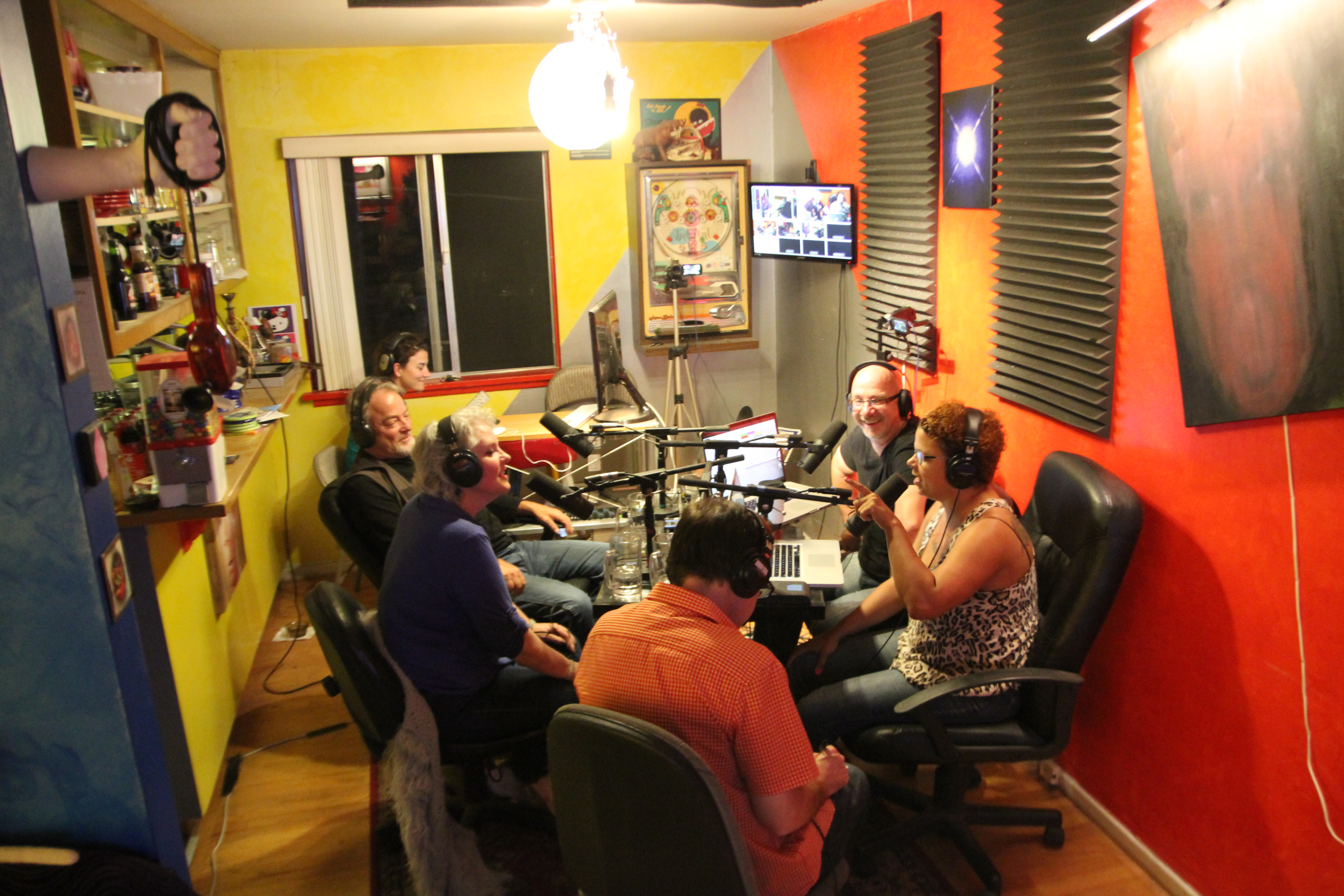
Recording Skeptically Yours 2014 Susan Gerbic, Mark Edward, Emery Emery and Heather Henderson

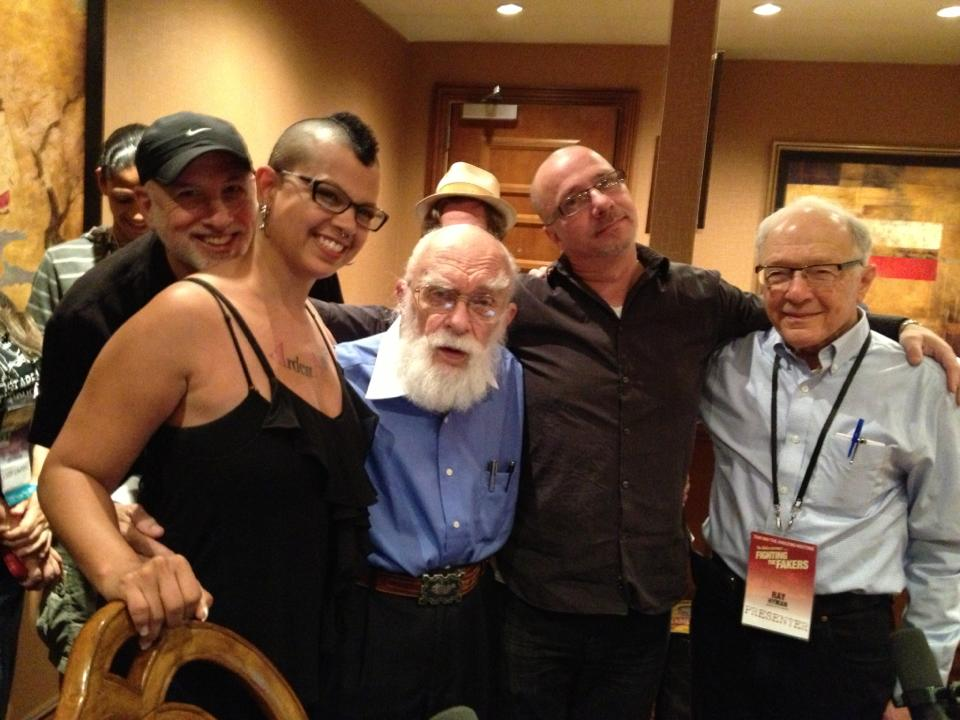
Participants in the "Skeptically Yours" podcast recorded at The Amazing Meeting for skeptics in 2013. Left to right: singer-songwriter Gary Stockdale, Henderson, magician and meeting founder James Randi, comedian Emery Emery, and psychology professor Ray Hyman.

Henderson is the co-host of two podcasts with Emery Emery, Ardent Atheist and Skeptically Yours. They started producing the Ardent Atheist podcast in February 2011.

In 2012, Ardent Atheist won best podcast in the religion inspiration category for The People's Choice Podcast Awards.

From November 2012 to April 2013 Henderson appeared as a featured segment on the Skepticality podcast. Her segment was called News in Religion.

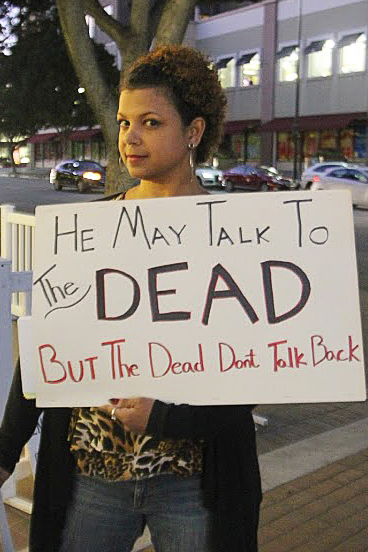
At psychic John Edward Protest 2015
