= Two Days =

Two Days may refer to:

- Two Days (2011 film), a Russian romantic comedy-drama film
- Two Days (2003 film), an American drama film
