= Christina Martin =

British writer (born 1980)

Christina Martin (born January 1980) is a British writer and former stand-up comedian.

She came third in the 2006 Funny Women Awards. She was a feature writer for Viz magazine between 2006 and 2009. Her articles appear in the annuals 'Last Turkey in the Shop', 'The Council Gritter', 'The Five Knuckle Shuffle' and 'The Cleveland Steamer' and in their thirty year retrospective book 'Anus Horribilis'. Christina wrote for New Humanist magazine between 2007 and 2009. 'God Trumps', her feature from the Nov/Dec 2008 issue, is the most viewed online article in the website's history gaining 50,000 hits in one day and has been made into a playable card game. A chapter she wrote on the creation of God Trumps featured in The Atheist's Guide to Christmas. She has appeared on the BBC7 show Festival Atmosphere 2006 and the BBC Radio 4 show 28 Acts in 28 Minutes. She was also part of the writing team for the Radio 4 show Recorded for Training Purposes and wrote for one episode of The Now Show. In a Guardian interview, Richard Herring named her as one of the funniest people he knew.

She has featured twice on Radio 4's The Untold, once as the focus of an episode and once in a catch up episode. The former episode was selected as a Radio 4 and The Guardian Guide Pick of The Week and gained interest from a publisher who approached her to write a book. In 2021 she was signed by the Jo Unwin Literary Agency. Her first book was published in March 2023, under the pen name Evie King.

== Bibliography ==
- The Atheist's Guide to Christmas. Friday Project. 2010. ISBN 9780007389827.
- King, Evie (2023). Ashes To Admin: Tales from the Caseload of a Council Funeral Officer. Mirror Books. ISBN 9781915306302.
- King, Evie (2026). Get Ahead of Being Dead: Your Handy Planner for the End of Life. Octopus Publishing Group. ISBN 9781804193785.
