= Carnac the Magnificent =

Recurring character on The Tonight Show Starring Johnny Carson

Carson as Carnac the Magnificent

Carnac the Magnificent was a recurring comedic role played by Johnny Carson on The Tonight Show Starring Johnny Carson. One of Carson's most well-known characters, Carnac was a "mystic from the East" who could psychically "divine" answers to unseen questions.

The character was introduced in 1964. As Carnac, Carson wore a large feathered turban and a cape. The character would emerge from behind the show's curtain accompanied by Indian music and make his way towards the desk, where he would invariably stumble on the step in front of the desk and lose his balance. On two occasions that were frequently shown on anniversary specials, Carson's desk was replaced with a lightweight balsa-wood version; this allowed Carson to trip and smash through it. In the first instance, the replica desk looked like the ornate desk from the early to mid 1970s, while a second instance of the stunt was performed with a replica of the late 1970s plain desk.

The character was taken from Steve Allen's essentially identical "Answer Man" segment, which Allen performed during his tenure as host of The Tonight Show in the 1950s. As Allen acknowledged in his book The Question Man, this bit had been created in Kansas City in 1951 by Bob Arbogast and used on The Tom Poston Show in New York, where it eventually ended up on The Steve Allen Show, much to the surprise of both Arbogast and Allen. The Carnac character and routine also closely resemble Ernie Kovacs' "Mr. Question Man". As a more serious device, the concept had served as the basis for several game shows, including the CBS Television Quiz, That's the Question, and the still-running Jeopardy!, which aired on NBC for much of Carson's run on Tonight.

Kreskin had repeatedly stated that he was the inspiration for Carnac. He stated that Carson developed the character after seeing him trip onstage during a 1964 television appearance, mimicking both his physical entrance and mentalist persona.

== Act ==
Longtime sidekick Ed McMahon ritualistically and bombastically introduced the Carnac routines. The announcement implied Carnac was responsible for some scandal or disaster currently in the news, followed by "And now, the great seer, soothsayer, and sage, Carnac the Magnificent." After Carnac entered and stumbled, McMahon would continue as follows:

"I hold in my hand the envelopes. As a child of four can plainly see, these envelopes have been hermetically sealed. They've been kept in a mayonnaise jar on Funk and Wagnalls' porch since noon today. NO ONE [at this shout, Carnac always acts startled] knows the contents of these envelopes – but you, in your mystical and borderline divine way, will ascertain the answers having never before heard the questions."

"Sis boom bah." "Describe the sound made when a sheep explodes."

— Ed McMahon's favorite Carnac the Magnificent punchline

The act involved a variation of the magician's billet reading trick: divining the answer to a question written on a card sealed inside one of the envelopes, announcing it to the audience, then tearing open the envelope to reveal the question. The comedy came from an unexpected question following a seemingly straightforward answer. The resulting jokes often involved puns or wordplay; for example, "The La Brea Tar Pits" was the answer to "What do you have left after eating the La Brea Tar Peaches?", and "9W" was the answer to "Mr. Wagner, do you spell your name with a V?" Jokes would also be topical; for instance, "Over 105 in Los Angeles" (presumably referring to the temperature) instead led to "Under the Reagan plan, how old would you have to be to collect Social Security?" The longest laugh ever recorded on the show was given to "Sis Boom Bah," which was the answer to "Describe the sound made when a sheep explodes" and resulted in both Carson and McMahon breaking character to laugh as well.

The segment included several running gags. After Carnac said an answer, McMahon would frequently repeat it in a booming voice – ostensibly as a help to the audience – setting up a sneer, putdown, or some other comic reaction from Carson. Carnac held each envelope to his forehead while "divining" the answer, then tore open the end of the envelope and loudly blew into it before removing the index card with the question. Pretending to psychically concentrate, Carnac periodically asked for "complete silence" from the audience, and McMahon would retort that he often got it. Although normally it was McMahon who performed the segment with Carson, on at least one occasion, June 25, 1974, bandleader Doc Severinsen filled in while McMahon was off.

Audience reaction played a major role in the skit. Positive reaction would prompt disbelief from Carnac, stating the ease at which he could make people laugh, such as "This audience would laugh at Dinah Shore backing into a meat thermometer." If a joke (often a very bad pun) generated a negative response, Carnac would give a disapproving look, then cast a comedic "Middle Eastern curse" upon the audience (such as "May your favorite daughter be featured in NFL Films' Sack of the Week", "May a bloated yak change the temperature of your jacuzzi", "May you walk a mile under a diseased camel", "May a demented deer lock horns with your daughter's Kawasaki", "May the fleas of a thousand camels infest the crotch of the person seated next to me, and may his arms be too short to scratch", "May a diseased camel be sick on your prayer rug", or "May your proctologist be a frustrated concert trombonist"). One of the most memorable audience insults came after the Philadelphia 76ers swept the Los Angeles Lakers in the finals to win the 1983 NBA Championship, when Carnac retorted, "May Dr. J slam dunk your cat." McMahon's closing announcement "I hold in my hand the last envelope" was always met with a loud cheer, prompting one final "curse".

The curse concept was created by "Tonight Show" head writer and Woody Allen collaborator Marshall Brickman. He dubbed it the "Carnac Saver" and said in a 2009 interview, "I'll go to my grave having to apologize for having invented the Carnac Saver." Songwriter Neal Merritt used the Carnac Saver as his primary inspiration for a song with a similar insult as a title, "May the Bird of Paradise Fly Up Your Nose," a hit for Little Jimmy Dickens.

== Tribute ==
Since the 1980s, Howard Stern has paid tribute to Carnac the Magnificent with his own skit called Sternac the Improbable. The character was also parodied in The Simpsons episodes "Homer's Barbershop Quartet" and "The Blunder Years". In 2024 a biography of Carson written by Bill Zehme and Mike Thomas was published. The title, "Carson the Magnificent", alludes to the recurring sketch.
