= The Great Buck Howard =

- Theatrical release poster
- Directed by: Sean McGinly
- Written by: Sean McGinly
- Produced by: Tom Hanks; Gary Goetzman
- Starring: John Malkovich; Colin Hanks; Emily Blunt; Ricky Jay; Griffin Dunne; Steve Zahn; Tom Hanks
- Cinematography: Tak Fujimoto
- Edited by: Myron Kerstein
- Music by: Blake Neely
- Production companies: Playtone; Walden Media; Bristol Bay Productions
- Distributed by: Magnolia Pictures (United States); Summit Entertainment (Overseas)
- Release dates: January 18, 2008 (Sundance); March 20, 2009 (United States)
- Running time: 90 minutes
- Country: United States
- Language: English
- Box office: $1 million

The Great Buck Howard is a 2008 American comedy-drama film directed by Sean McGinly that stars Colin Hanks and John Malkovich. Tom Hanks also appears as the father of his real-life son's character. The character Buck Howard is inspired by the mentalist The Amazing Kreskin, whose popularity was at its height in the 1970s. The film premiered at the 2008 Sundance Film Festival on January 18, 2008. It is the first Walden Media film to be distributed by Magnolia Pictures.

== Plot summary ==
Troy Gable (Colin Hanks) defies his father (Tom Hanks) and leaves law school to pursue his dream of becoming a writer in Los Angeles. To support himself, he takes a job as a road manager for "The Great" Buck Howard (John Malkovich), a fading mentalist. Troy comes to enjoy traveling with Buck to performances in smaller venues such as Bakersfield and Akron. In particular, Troy sincerely admires Buck's signature trick: having someone in the audience hide his fee for that night's performance, which he then unfailingly discovers. (Kreskin is said to have actually performed this feat 6,000 times, only failing to find the money nine times.)

A reluctant publicist, Valerie Brennan (Emily Blunt), is sent to join them in Cincinnati as a replacement for a more senior colleague to promote Buck's still secret attempt to resurrect his career. Valerie is disgusted by Buck's verbal abuse towards her and Troy, with whom she becomes romantically involved. Buck reveals that his comeback will involve putting "hundreds" of people (actually only a few dozen) to sleep and then awakening them as if from the dead. The trick works, but despite a large press turnout, no one is there to record the act, since the news media is called away at the last second to cover a car accident involving Jerry Springer. Furious, Buck unfairly blames the mishap on Troy and Valerie, and then faints from exhaustion. In the hospital, Buck and Troy discover that the media absence actually worked in Buck's favor, as rumors reported by the news media exaggerate the scope of Buck's act; as a result, Buck returns to the limelight as a retro-"hip" phenomenon. He appears on television shows such as those of Jon Stewart, Regis Philbin, Conan O'Brien, and more. Buck is reunited with his estranged friend, George Takei, who sings "What the World Needs Now".

Buck finally gets the call he has been waiting for: To perform once again on The Tonight Show. He previously had performed with Johnny Carson 61 times during the height of his career, but never since the show has been hosted by Jay Leno. Buck is bumped by Tom Arnold, who has too much material and uses up Buck's time. Buck refuses an immediate offer to come back and appear on The Tonight Show the following week, but agrees to receive an offer to headline a date in Las Vegas. When the limelight on Buck dims once more after he fails to find his money for the first time ever during his Las Vegas premiere, Troy leaves him and through Valerie's connections, lands a job with a celebrated TV writer (Griffin Dunne). After some time, Troy sees from an ad in the paper that Buck is doing his show again in Bakersfield. Buck is clearly back where he feels most comfortable, and once again successfully performs his signature trick, leaving Troy to wonder whether Buck doesn't have some mysterious talent after all.

== Cast ==
- John Malkovich as Buck Howard
- Colin Hanks as Troy Gable
- Emily Blunt as Valerie Brennan
- Ricky Jay as Gil Bellamy
- Steve Zahn as Kenny the limo driver
- Tom Hanks as Mr. Gable
- Griffin Dunne as Jonathan Finerman
- Matthew Gray Gubler as Russell
- Debra Monk as Doreen
- Adam Scott as Alan Berkman
- Patrick Fischler as Michael Perry
- Wallace Langham as Dan Green
- Don Most (aka "Donny Most") as Tonight Show Producer
- Nate Hartley as Teenager
- Wendy Worthington as Oregon woman
- Jack Carter as grateful old performer
- Dave Attell as Comedian
- Melissa Stone as Las Vegas Wife

Portraying themselves

- Gary Coleman
- Michael Winslow
- Jack Carter
- Martha Stewart
- Damien Fahey
- Conan O'Brien
- Jon Stewart
- David Blaine
- Regis Philbin
- Kelly Ripa
- George Takei
- Mary Hart
- Jay Leno
- Tom Arnold
- Bill Saluga

== Reception ==
The Great Buck Howard received generally positive reviews. Rotten Tomatoes reported that 71% of critics gave it positive reviews based on 94 reviews, with an average score of 6.40/10. The website's critics consensus reads: "By turns fluffy and biting, this show biz comedy is given girth by comic heavyweight John Malkovich and made all the more charming by Emily Blunt." Metacritic, which uses a weighted average, assigned the film a score of 63 out of 100, based on 25 critics, indicating "generally favorable" reviews. The film was released to the general public on March 20, 2009, grossing $750,000 in total. It was run in 55 theaters. The worldwide gross stands at $900,689.
