= The Atheist's Guide to Christmas =

2009 book

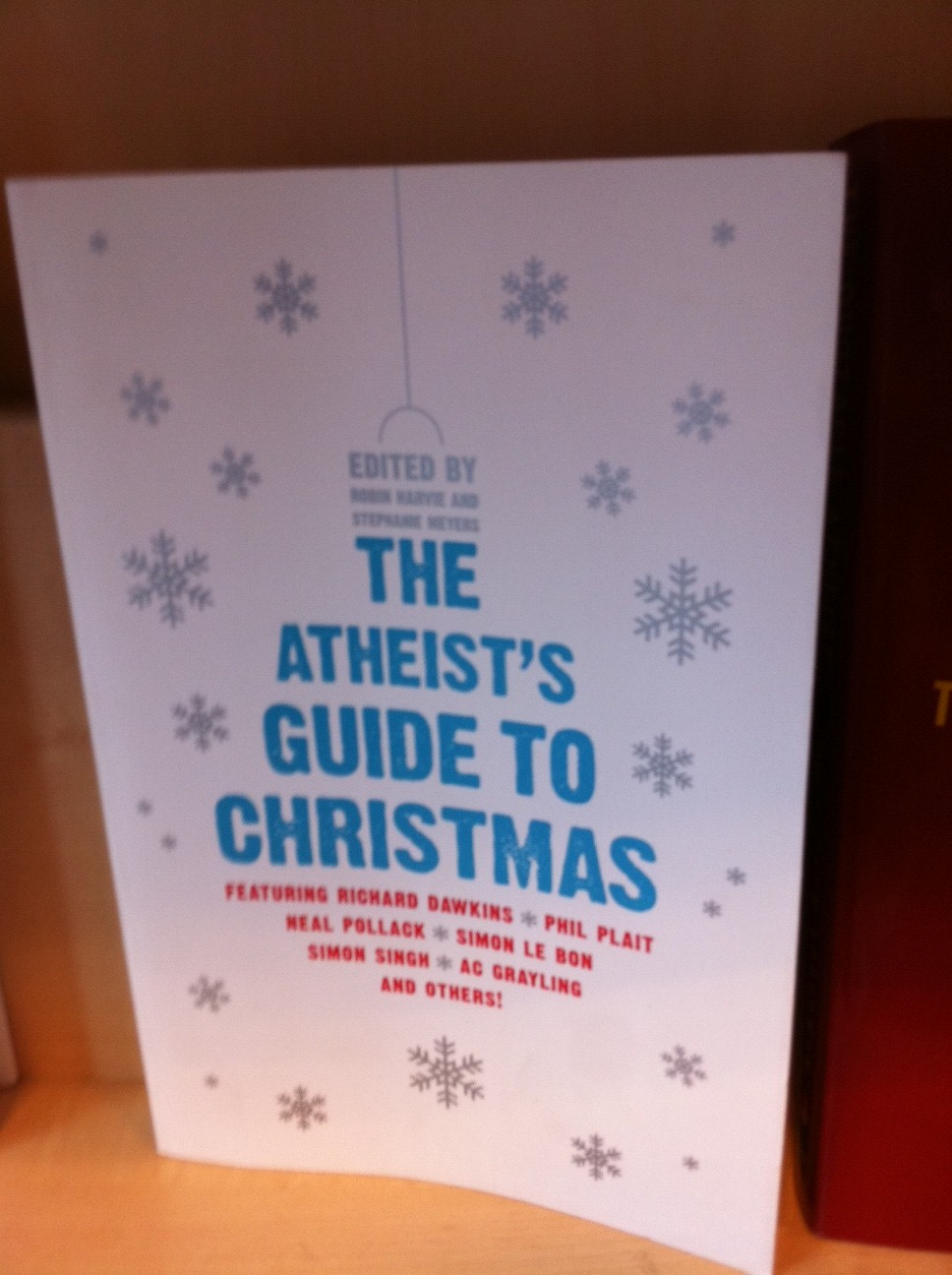
- Author: Ariane Sherine (Editor)
- Language: English
- Genre: Nonfiction
- Publisher: Friday Project/Harper Perennial(US Edition)
- Publication date: 1 Oct 2009 (14 Oct 2010 Paperback)/ 2 November 2010 (US Edition)
- Publication place: United Kingdom
- Media type: Print/Audiobook (Hardcover/Paperback)
- Pages: 272
- ISBN: 978-0-00-732261-9

The Atheist's Guide to Christmas is a 2009 book written by 42 atheist celebrities, comedians, scientists and writers who give their humorous and serious tips for enjoying the Christmas season as an atheist. It made the Amazon best-seller list on its launch. It is the first atheist charity book campaign with the full book advance and half of the royalties being donated to the UK HIV charity Terrence Higgins Trust.

Contributors to the book include Richard Dawkins, Charlie Brooker, Derren Brown, Ben Goldacre, Jenny Colgan, David Baddiel, Simon Singh, AC Grayling, Jey McCreight, Natalie Haynes, Brian Cox, Nick Doody, Ed Byrne, Christina Martin, Matt Kirshen, Richard Herring, Emery Emery and Simon Le Bon. In the audio book version, the authors read out their contributions. The number of authors was kept to 42 to honor the memory of Douglas Adams, a friend of Richard Dawkins and an atheist himself.
