= The Aristocrats (film) =

2005 film by Paul Provenza, Penn Jillette

- Directed by: Penn Jillette; Paul Provenza
- Produced by: Peter Adam Golden; Paul Provenza
- Starring: see below
- Cinematography: Paul Provenza
- Edited by: Emery Emery; Paul Provenza
- Music by: Gary Stockdale
- Production company: Mighty Cheese Productions
- Distributed by: THINKFilm
- Release date: August 12, 2005
- Running time: 89 minutes
- Country: United States
- Language: English
- Box office: $6.4 million

The Aristocrats is a 2005 American documentary comedy film about the famous eponymous dirty joke. The film was conceived and produced by comedians Penn Jillette, Paul Provenza and Peter Adam Golden, and it was edited by Emery Emery. Distributed by THINKFilm, it is dedicated to Johnny Carson, as "The Aristocrats" was said to be his favorite joke.

== The joke ==
"The Aristocrats" is a longstanding transgressive joke amongst comedians, in which the setup and punchline are almost always the same (or similar). It is the joke's midsection – which may be as long as the one telling it prefers and is often completely improvised – that makes or breaks a particular rendition.

The joke involves a person pitching an act to a talent agent. Typically the first line is, "A man walks into a talent agent's office." The man then describes the act. From this point, up to (but not including) the punchline, the teller of the joke is expected to ad-lib the most shocking act they can possibly imagine. This often involves elements of incest, group sex, graphic violence, defecation, coprophilia, necrophilia, bestiality, rape, child sexual abuse, and various other taboo behaviors.

The joke, as first delivered in the film, contains the set-up line "What the heck do you call an act like that?" followed by the punchline "I call it 'The Aristocrats'." In subsequent renditions of the joke, the agent asks, "What do you call your act?", which is the traditional set-up line.

The film itself consists of interviews with various comedians and actors, usually in candid settings. The interviewees engage both in telling their own versions of the joke, and in reminiscing about their experiences with it, the joke's place in comedy history, and even dissecting the logic behind the joke's appeal. A key aspect of the Aristocrats joke is that it was never told to audiences as part of the comedian's stand-up routine. Instead, it was an inside joke among comedians themselves, who used it as a tool to challenge each other as to who could tell the funniest and most outrageous rendition.

While most of the filmed versions of the joke follow the standard format of a raunchy description followed by the punchline of "the Aristocrats", some versions do vary the joke. Two tellings of it, including that of comedian Wendy Liebman, invert the joke by describing an elegant and beautiful performance act which has been given a lewd and transgressive name. Actor Taylor Negron told his joke as a mixture of salacious sex acts and calmly delivered observations on life. Actor Steven Banks, as Billy the Mime, performs the joke on the street as a mime performance. Most infamously, Sarah Silverman's rendition, where she tells the joke in an anecdotal manner from the perspective of the daughter in the family, went on to garner controversy for its punchline involving radio and TV personality Joe Franklin.

== Featured celebrities ==
The following celebrities are featured in the film, telling the joke themselves and/or providing substantial commentary on its history:

- Chris Albrecht
- Jason Alexander
- Hank Azaria
- Shelley Berman
- Billy the Mime
- Lewis Black
- David Brenner
- Mario Cantone
- Drew Carey
- George Carlin
- Margaret Cho
- Mark Cohen
- Carrot Top
- Billy Connolly
- Tim Conway
- Pat Cooper
- Wayne Cotter
- Andy Dick
- Phyllis Diller
- Susie Essman
- Carrie Fisher
- Joe Franklin
- Todd Glass
- Judy Gold
- Whoopi Goldberg
- Eddie Gorodetsky
- Gilbert Gottfried
- Dana Gould
- Allan Havey
- Eric Idle
- Dom Irrera
- Eddie Izzard
- Richard Jeni
- Jake Johannsen
- The Amazing Johnathan
- Alan Kirschenbaum
- Jay Kogen
- Paul Krassner
- Cathy Ladman
- Lisa Lampanelli
- Richard Lewis
- Wendy Liebman
- Bill Maher
- Howie Mandel
- Merrill Markoe
- Jay Marshall
- Jackie Martling
- Chuck McCann
- Michael McKean
- Larry Miller
- Martin Mull
- Kevin Nealon
- Taylor Negron
- The Onion editorial staff
- Otto and George
- Rick Overton
- Gary Owens
- The Passing Zone
- Penn & Teller
- Emo Philips
- Kevin Pollak
- Paul Reiser
- Andy Richter
- Don Rickles
- Chris Rock
- Gregg Rogell
- Jeffrey Ross
- Rita Rudner
- Bob Saget
- T. Sean Shannon
- Harry Shearer
- Sarah Silverman
- Bobby Slayton
- The Smothers Brothers
- Carrie Snow
- Doug Stanhope
- David Steinberg
- Jon Stewart
- Larry Storch
- Rip Taylor
- Dave Thomas
- Johnny Thompson
- Bruce Vilanch
- Fred Willard
- Robin Williams
- Steven Wright

Many other comedians were filmed but not included due to time constraints. According to a letter from Penn Jillette to critic Roger Ebert, Buddy Hackett and Rodney Dangerfield were intended to be included, but they died before they could be filmed. Jillette also indicated that, this being Johnny Carson's favorite joke, Carson was also invited to appear, but he declined.

Trey Parker and Matt Stone animated a segment of the film where Eric Cartman tells a version of the joke.

== Controversies ==
=== Joe Franklin ===
In the film, Sarah Silverman tells a version of the joke as if it were autobiographical and she had been one of the "Aristocrats" performers as a child. Silverman builds the story to include her family being booked on veteran talk show host Joe Franklin's show, and ends with her punch line: a deadpan allegation that Franklin had raped her during a phony rehearsal for the show. The New Yorker reported that Silverman's telling of the joke led Franklin, who is also featured in the film, to consider filing a defamation lawsuit against the comedian.

On the April 20, 2011, episode of the WFMU show Seven Second Delay, Franklin jokes that he had been so successful lately because he sued Silverman.

=== AMC ban ===
The theatre chain AMC refused to show The Aristocrats on any of its 3,500+ screens. Although AMC claimed the decision was due to the film's limited appeal, co-producer Penn Jillette commented to MSNBC: "It's the kind of thing that makes you go 'Come on, play fair.' It's not like we're trying to slide this by anybody by calling it Love Bug 2: Herbie Takes It Up the Ass."

=== Friars Club roast footage ===
The film includes footage of Gottfried's telling of the joke at a Comedy Central/New York Friars' Club roast of Hugh Hefner which had been almost entirely censored when aired on television. Taped not long after the September 11 attacks, the incident occurred at a time when, according to one of the commentators in the Aristocrats film, entertainers were uncertain how much comedy was allowed in the aftermath of the attacks. Gottfried followed Rob Schneider, who had received mixed results with his stand-up comedy performance in Hefner's honor. Gottfried began his performance with a joke in which he claimed to have to catch a late flight out of town but was worried because his flight "had a connection at the Empire State Building." The joke, a reference to 9/11, was poorly received by the audience, who showered Gottfried with boos and cries of "too soon." In response, Gottfried told an obscenity-filled rendition of the Aristocrats joke. According to the film, the telling was as much a cathartic experience for the audience as it was a shocking one, regardless of whether viewers were familiar with the joke or not. During his performance, Gottfried told the audience "They might have to clean this up for TV."

== Release ==
The film first played at the 2005 Sundance Film Festival before entering a limited release on July 29th of the same year. The Film brought in $6.37 million domestically, and $6.8 million worldwide.

== Reception ==
The Aristocrats received a generally positive reception from film critics. Review aggregation website Rotten Tomatoes reports the film as holding an overall 79% approval rating based on 150 reviews, and an average rating of 7.1 out of 10. The site's general consensus is that the film is hilarious and revealing of the way comedy works. "Can a joke stand up to repeated tellings? The Aristocrats demonstrates that it's possible." On Metacritic, the film has a weighted average score of 72 out of 100, based on 39 reviews.

Todd McCarthy of Variety gave a positive review, describing it a "raucous insider documentary that invites the viewer to share a secret held exclusively by comics for untold generations". Ken Tucker of New York magazine called it a "gloriously filthy, ramshackle, endearing documentary".

=== Accolades ===
Year	Award	Organization	Category	Result
2005	U.S. Comedy Arts Festival Award	U.S. Comedy Arts Festival	Best Documentary	Won
2005	Grand Jury Prize	Sundance Film Festival	Documentary	Nominated
2006	Golden Trailer Award	Golden Trailer Awards	Best Documentary	Nominated
2006	OFCS Award	Online Film Critics Society	Best Documentary	Nominated
2006	Satellite Award	International Press Academy	Best Documentary DVD	Nominated
