= The Green Room with Paul Provenza =

- Genre: Talk show
- Created by: Paul Provenza
- Directed by: Michael Franks, Barbara Romen
- Starring: Provenza and panel
- Opening theme: "Somebody Start a Fight or Something" by TISM
- Country of origin: United States
- Original language: English
- No. of seasons: 2
- No. of episodes: 14

Production
- Executive producers: Barbara Romen; Paul Provenza
- Production locations: The Vanguard, Hollywood, CA
- Running time: 30 min

Original release
- Network: Showtime
- Release: June 10, 2010 – September 1, 2011

The Green Room with Paul Provenza is a talk show on Showtime, hosted by Paul Provenza. Each episode featured a panel of guests discussing comedy.

== Synopsis ==
At the start of each episode, the camera would approach a stage door in an alley, where one of that series' guests appeared, only to warn the viewer off, saying that the event is for "comics only." In another nearby doorway, Provenza then motioned the viewer in, with the advice to "be cool," warning, "if you've ever been offended by anything, don't come in." The camera then followed Provenza into the building, via hallways and stairs to a final door, which would open onto the soundstage, where the evening's guests were already in conversation. After the show's halfway mark, if a guest uses music in their comedy act, such as Bo Burnham or Franklyn Ajaye, they may perform a comedic musical number. The theme song to the series is Australian alternative rock band TISM's 2004 song "Somebody Start a Fight or Something".

== Production ==
The series was based on the live stage panel The Green Room, which Provenza hosts at the annual Montreal Just For Laughs Comedy Festival, where guests converse before a live audience, often predominantly of other comedians and other celebrities. The TV show was produced in Hollywood and videotaped at the Vanguard Club in Hollywood. The final two episodes of the second season were Provenza's regular panels, recorded at the Mainline Theatre on July 30, 2011, in Montreal, at the Just For Laughs Festival.

The show premiered on Showtime June 10, 2010, airing weekly for six episodes. Showtime subsequently announced its renewal for a second season, initially six episodes, on September 9, 2010. The second season premiered on July 14, 2011, airing weekly for eight episodes. Showtime had not ordered a third season.

== Reception ==
The show received a range of positive and mixed reviews. The Los Angeles Times review noted "for every story that peters out, there are moments of insight, thought-provoking debates and hilarious anecdotes", and summarized, "for all its digressions into obscenities, over- or under-worked material and more than occasional chest pounding, The Green Room With Paul Provenza manages to pack a considerable intellectual punch into a half hour." The A.V. Club reviewer Steve Heisler stated that the Showtime show, as compared to the Just for Laughs live show, "has too many factors keeping audiences at a distance." He gave the series premiere episode a "C+", citing the abrupt introduction of the viewer to the guests in mid-conversation, and the sometimes choppy editing which takes him "out of the moment." Heisler continued, "when the magic happens...", those "...moments are worth sticking around for, if only it weren't so hard to find them." In 2010, the show made the Time magazine "The Short List of Things to Do," describing the show as a "loose, racy roundtable." April MacIntyre, in Monsters and Critics, called the show "genius" and stated "the anecdotes are priceless for those who truly love comedy, comics and stand up as an art form."

== Episodes ==
=== Season 1 (2010) ===
No.	Guests	Original release date
1	Drew Carey, Reginald D. Hunter, Eddie Izzard, Larry Miller	June 10, 2010
2	Sandra Bernhard, Patrice O'Neal, Roseanne Barr, Bob Saget	June 17, 2010
3	Brendon Burns, Andy Dick, Dana Gould, Andy Kindler	June 24, 2010
4	Jim Jefferies, Paul Mooney, Rain Pryor, Bobby Slayton	July 1, 2010
5	Robert Klein, Rick Overton, Jonathan Winters	July 8, 2010
6	Penn Jillette, Martin Mull, Tom Smothers	July 15, 2010

=== Season 2 (2011) ===
No.	Guests	Original release date
7	Judd Apatow, Bo Burnham, Marc Maron, Ray Romano, Garry Shandling	July 14, 2011
8	Franklyn Ajaye, Dana Gould, Kathy Griffin, Greg Proops	July 21, 2011
9	Richard Belzer, Janeane Garofalo, Dave Attell, Doug Stanhope, Glenn Wool	July 28, 2011
10	Lewis Black, Ron White, Kathleen Madigan, Jamie Kilstein	August 4, 2011
11	Margaret Cho, Richard Lewis, Jeff Ross, Kumail Nanjiani	August 11, 2011
12	Tommy Chong, Joe Rogan, Rick Shapiro, Eddie Ifft	August 18, 2011
13	Bill Burr, Russell Peters, Colin Quinn, Caroline Rhea, Lizz Winstead	August 25, 2011
14	Jimmy Carr, Judah Friedlander, Chris Hardwick, Eddie Izzard, Tim Minchin	September 1, 2011
