= God, No! =

2011 book by Penn Jillette

God, No! Signs You May Already Be An Atheist and Other Magical Tales
- Author: Penn Jillette
- Language: English
- Subject: atheism
- Publisher: Simon & Schuster
- Publication date: 2011
- Publication place: United States
- Pages: 256
- ISBN: 1-4516-1036-X

God, No! Signs You May Already Be An Atheist and Other Magical Tales is a book by illusionist and comedian Penn Jillette. Described as an atheist bible of sorts by reviewers, the book includes an atheist's take on the 10 commandments. Jillette also tells of his childhood growing up in Greenfield, Massachusetts as well as his current life in Las Vegas.

The book reached #12 on the New York Times Hardcover Nonfiction list and spent a total of six weeks on the list.
