= Sean McGinly =

American film director and screenwriter

Sean McGinly is an American film director and screenwriter. His film Two Days, starring Paul Rudd and Donal Logue, piqued the interest of Tom Hanks, who then agreed to produce McGinly's project, The Great Buck Howard, through his Playtone production company. The film stars Hanks himself along with his son Colin Hanks, John Malkovich and Emily Blunt.

== Early life ==
McGinly was born in Philadelphia to an Irish-German father and an Irish-Italian mother. He was raised in Northern Virginia.

== Career ==
In 1994, McGinly moved to Los Angeles, where he began writing student films and straight-to-video films. In 2000, while on a trip to Dublin, Ireland, he co-wrote a comedy film, Two Days. He went on to direct the film as well, and got Paul Rudd, Donal Logue, and Adam Scott to star in it.

McGinly then wrote and directed Brothers Lost: A Story of 9/11, a memorial documentary that interviewed 31 men from 25 families who had lost brothers on that day. He had also lost his brother during the 9/11 attacks.

Two Days led to McGinly's big break which was directing and writing The Great Buck Howard. At the 2008 Sundance Film Festival, The Great Buck Howard received an honorable mention in Alex Billington’s “Best of the Fest” list for FirstShowing.net, where it was ranked among the standout films of the festival. In 2017, he began production on Silver Lake, starring Martin Starr and Deborah Ann Woll.

Following The Great Buck Howard, McGinly returned to independent filmmaking with Silver Lake, a drama starring Martin Starr and Deborah Ann Woll that went into production in 2017. The film premiered at festivals in 2019, where it drew positive notices. Writing for Keeping It Reel, critic David J. Fowlie described Silver Lake as “populated with a solid cast, all of whom portray these eccentric characters with a natural authenticity,” and noted that McGinly “has a knack for capturing a distinct environment along with the eccentric people that live there.”

McGinly next wrote and directed Match (2022), a drama set in the world of online dating and starring Austin Nichols and Ahna O’Reilly. The film was screened at the DTLA Film Festival, where Nichols and O’Reilly won Best Actor awards. Reviewing the film for Keeping It Reel, David J. Fowlie called it “an engaging character study” that offered “an honest depiction of the highs and lows of dating in the modern age.”

In a 2021 feature with Film Ireland, McGinly was recognized for his 2007 memorial documentary Brothers Lost: A Story of 9/11, which pays tribute through intimate interviews with men who lost brothers in the attacks. The feature praised McGinly’s deeply personal direction style, noting how he turned collective tragedy into a reflective and meaningful cinematic experience, further establishing his versatility across genres.

== Filmography ==
=== Directing ===
- The Great Buck Howard
- Two Days
- Brothers
- The Truth About Juliet
- Writer's Block

=== Writing ===
- More Mercy
- Venomous
- Fugitive Mind
- Sonic Impact
- Evasive Action
- Scorned 2
- Strategic Command
- The Confidence Man
- Sexual Roulette
- Time Under Fire
