= Paul Provenza =

American actor, comedian, filmmaker and skeptic

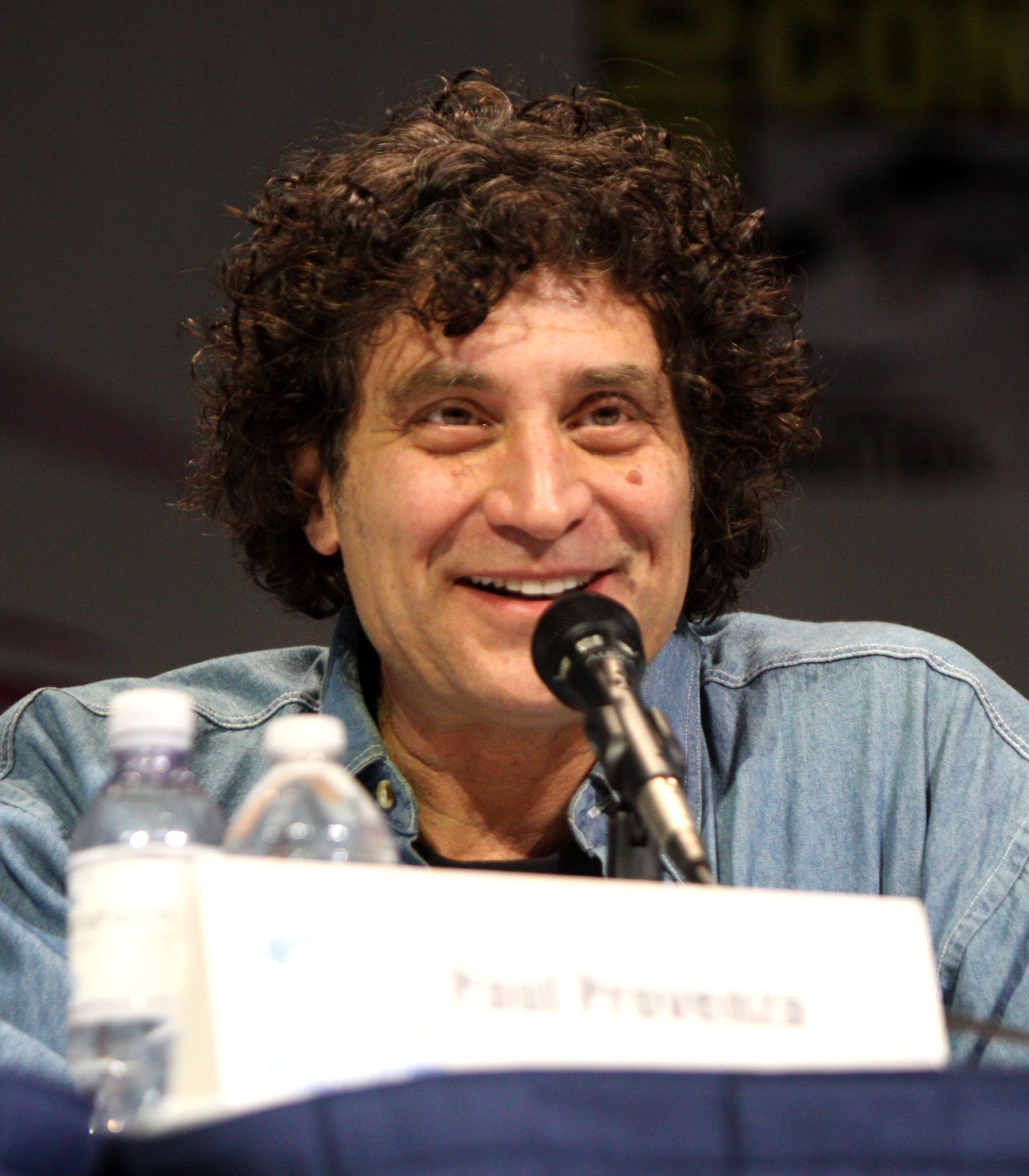
- Provenza in 2013
- Born: July 31, 1957 (age 69); New York City, U.S.
- Education: University of Pennsylvania, Royal Academy of Dramatic Arts
- Notable work: The Aristocrats, The Green Room with Paul Provenza, ¡Satiristas!

Comedy career
- Subject: Stand-up
- Website: twitter.com/paulprovenza

Paul Provenza (born July 31, 1957) is an American television presenter, actor, radio panelist, stand-up comedian, filmmaker, and skeptic based in Los Angeles. He has appeared on several podcasts and in recent years has interviewed other stand-up comedians. In 2005 he became a director, in 2010 an author and in 2011 he started producing for comedy festivals and television.

== Life and career ==
=== Early years ===
Provenza was born and grew up in the Pelham Parkway section of the Bronx, New York City, and graduated in 1975 from the Bronx High School of Science. In high school, he started performing stand-up comedy, making his stage debut at age 17 at the original The Improv in Manhattan. He continued performing while attending the University of Pennsylvania, taking a year's leave of absence to study in London at the Royal Academy of Dramatic Arts. While at RADA, he joined a classical repertory theater group, becoming one of few Americans to perform the role of Romeo on the London stage. He graduated in 1979 from the University of Pennsylvania, the year it awarded its first Theatre Arts degree. At Penn, he wrote for the Pennsylvania Punch Bowl and was a cast member of the Mask and Wig Club, where he has returned numerous times to perform in the annual Intercollegiate Comedy Festival.

=== Television work ===
Provenza made his first appearance on The Tonight Show Starring Johnny Carson on March 25, 1983. Additional television work includes hosting a short-lived Nickelodeon TV show from 1988 until 1989 called Kids Court, appearing as Patrick in Empty Nest, and playing Dr. Phil Capra in Season 6 of CBS's Northern Exposure, opposite Teri Polo. Provenza also hosted the Comedy Central series Comics Only, which ran from 1991 to 1995.

=== Stand up, theatre and radio work ===
While working as a standup comedian and on television, Provenza also found work in theatre. He received critical acclaim for his work on stage, with his performance in the Off-Broadway play Only Kidding! being nominated for a Drama Desk Award for Best Actor and winning the Theater World Award for Best Actor in a Play. He was the stand-up comedian opening act for Diana Ross for three years or more. He was honored with a caricature by the legendary Al Hirschfeld. Between 2006 and 2010 he also was a frequent panelist on Wait Wait Don't Tell Me.

=== Podcasts ===
Provenza has appeared on:

- WTF with Marc Maron Episode 92 on July 22, 2010
- The Longshot Podcast Episode 634 on June 6, 2013
- Ken Reid's TV Guidance Counselor Podcast on February 25, 2015
- Getting Doug with High along with Kelly Carlin on January 29, 2014
- The Tony Perkins Show Episode 52 featuring Gary Stein on July 25, 2015
- The Rubin Report Episode 32 along with David Silverman on April 29, 2016
- The Todd N Tyler Radio Empire "2/24 4-1 Paul Provenza" on April 24, 2017

=== Directing ===
After decades as a stand-up comic and actor, Provenza found a new calling as an interviewer of other stand-ups, culminating in his 2005 directorial debut, The Aristocrats (made with Penn Jillette). At the 2006 Edinburgh Fringe Festival, Provenza held a nightly show at the Underbelly, Talk of the Fest. Held at 11pm each night of the festival, the set up was described by Provenza as that of a "green room for the whole festival". Guests included Trey Parker and Matt Stone, the creators of South Park. The show was reprised by Provenza at the 2007 Just for Laughs comedy festival in Montreal, where guests included Billy Connolly, Eddie Izzard, and members of The Kids in the Hall. In 2010, Showtime picked up the show and on June 12, 2010, The Green Room with Paul Provenza debuted with many of the same festival guest line-ups.

=== Producing ===
In 2011, Provenza began developing a new show called Set List - Stand-Up Without A Net. The show was originally devised by Troy Conrad and features stand-up comedians who are made to improvise their sets based on suggestions they receive. After successful appearances at worldwide comedy festivals including Just For Laughs, the Melbourne Comedy Festival and the Edinburgh Fringe, it was picked up for television by UK broadcaster Sky Atlantic. The series included performers Robin Williams, Drew Carey and Frank Skinner and was also broadcast in Australia on ABC2

=== Religious skepticism ===
Provenza was Master of Ceremonies at the 2012 Reason Rally held on the mall in Washington, DC, welcoming a crowd of approximately 30,000.

=== Author ===
In May, 2010, Provenza's book, ¡Satiristas!, with photography by Dan Dion was released by Harper-Collins. It features in-depth interviews with Stephen Colbert, Bill Maher, George Carlin, Marc Maron, among others.

== Filmography ==
- Odd Jobs - Byron (1986)
- Pursuit of Happiness - David Hanley (1987–1988)
- The Facts of Life - Casey Clark (1987–1988)
- Kids' Court - Host (1988)
- Miami Vice - TV series, "Miami Squeeze" (5x11) (1989)
- Comics Only - Host (1991)
- Empty Nest - Patrick (1992–1993)
- Northern Exposure - Dr. Phillip Capra (1994–1995)
- Phobophilia: The Love of Fear (1995)
- Sabrina the Teenage Witch - Ethan (1996)
- Beggars and Choosers - Parker Meridian (1999–2000)
- The West Wing - Steve Onorato (2000)
- Fixing Frank - Jonathan Baldwin (2002)
- The Aristocrats - producer, director, editor (2005)
- The Green Room with Paul Provenza - Host (2010–2011)
