= Two Days (2003 film) =

- Directed by: Sean McGinly
- Written by: Sean McGinly; Karl Wiedergott
- Produced by: Mohit Ramchandani
- Starring: Paul Rudd; Donal Logue; Mackenzie Astin; Adam Scott; Karl Wiedergott; Joshua Leonard; Caroline Aaron; Graham Beckel
- Cinematography: Jens Sturup
- Edited by: Tripp Reed
- Music by: Alan Ari Lazar
- Distributed by: American World Pictures
- Release date: 2003
- Running time: 87 minutes
- Country: United States
- Language: English

Two Days is a 2003 drama film written and directed by Sean McGinly.

The film stars Paul Rudd, Karl Wiedergott, Mackenzie Astin, Marguerite Moreau, Lourdes Benedicto and Donal Logue.

== Plot ==
A man has a film crew documenting the last two days of his life before his planned suicide. During this time, friends, former girlfriends, and his parents try to convince him to stay alive; most of them think he is merely joking or making a plea for attention.

== Cast ==
- Paul Rudd as Paul Miller
- Adam Scott as Stu
- Karl Wiedergott as Charlie
- Mackenzie Astin as Stephen Bell
- Marguerite Moreau as Jennifer
- Lourdes Benedicto as Rachel Adams
- Donal Logue as Ray O'Connor

== Reception ==
Reelfilm said, "Two Days is certainly worth a look, if only for Rudd's astounding central performance."
