= Penn Jillette =

American magician and comedian (born 1955)

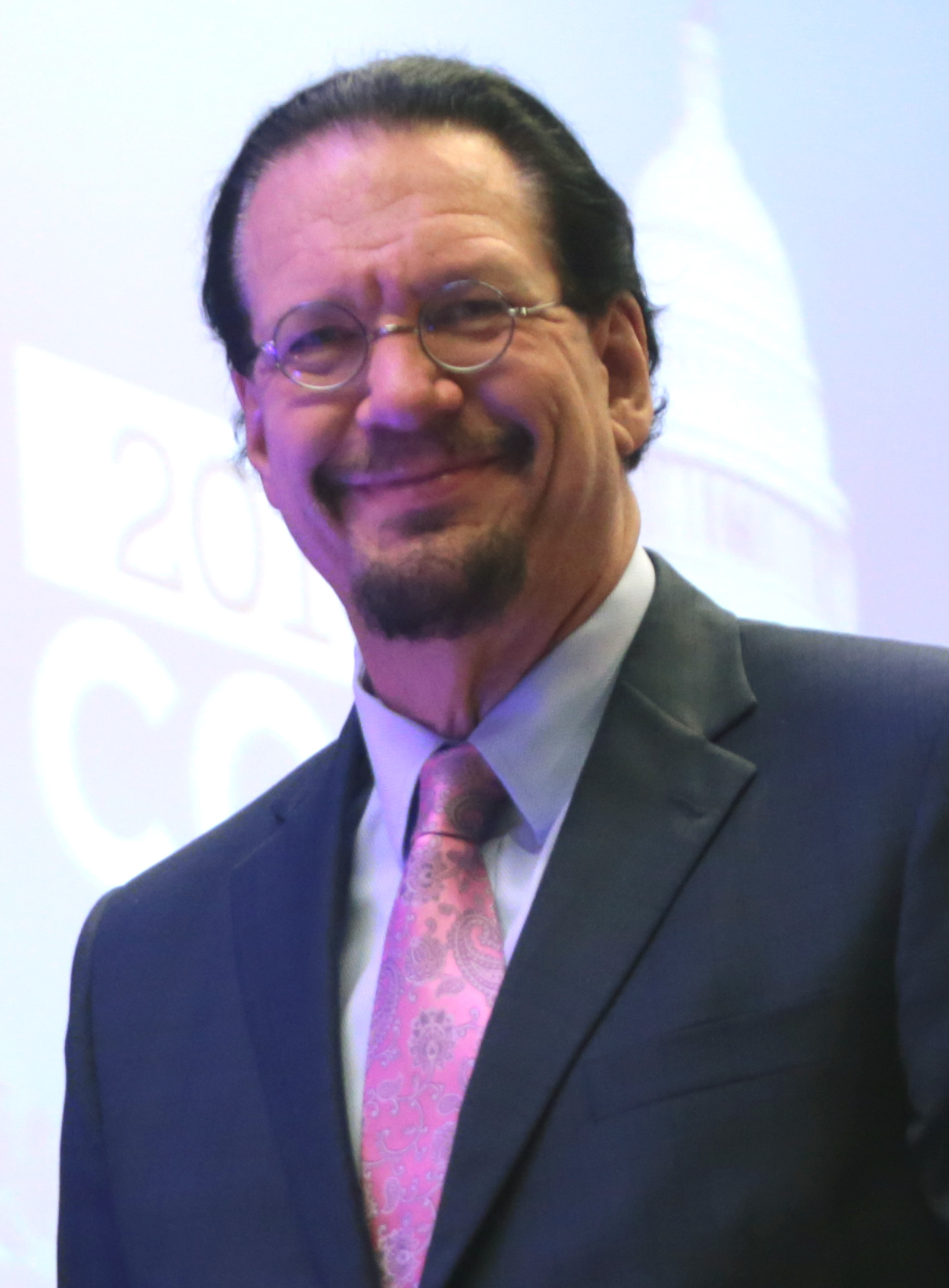
- Jillette at the Young Americans for Liberty National Convention in 2016
- Born: Penn Fraser Jillette; March 5, 1955 (age 71); Greenfield, Massachusetts, U.S.
- Education: Ringling Bros. and Barnum & Bailey Clown College
- Occupations: Magician; actor; author; musician; inventor; television presenter; comedian
- Years active: 1974–present
- Known for: Half of the comedy magic duo known as Penn & Teller
- Height: 6 ft 7 in (2.01 m)
- Spouse: Emily Zolten (m. 2004)
- Children: 2
- Website: pennandteller.com

Notes
- Voice of Penn Jillette

Penn Fraser Jillette (born March 5, 1955) is an American magician, entertainer and author, best known for his work with fellow magician Teller. Known as Penn & Teller, the duo has been featured in numerous stage and television shows, such as Penn & Teller: Fool Us and Penn & Teller: Bullshit!, and is as of 2026, celebrating 25 years headlining in Las Vegas at The Rio. Jillette serves as the act's orator and raconteur.

Jillette has published ten books, fiction and non-fiction, including the New York Times bestseller, God, No!: Signs You May Already Be an Atheist and Other Magical Tales. He is also known for his advocacy of atheism, scientific skepticism, the First Amendment, as well as previously identifying as a libertarian, a position he disavowed in 2020.

== Early life ==
Jillette was born in Greenfield, Massachusetts. His mother, Valda Rudolph Parks Jillette; 1909–2000 was a secretary, and his father, Samuel Herbert Jillette (1912–1999), worked at Greenfield's Franklin County Jail. Jillette became an atheist in his early teens after reading the Bible, while in a church youth group. He was subsequently asked to leave the church, after asking questions in the youth group that purportedly also made skeptics of his peers. Jillette became disenchanted with traditional illusionist acts that presented the craft as authentic magic, such as The Amazing Kreskin on The Tonight Show Starring Johnny Carson.

At age eighteen, he saw a show by illusionist James Randi, and became enamored of his approach to magic that openly acknowledged deception as entertainment rather than a mysterious supernatural power. Jillette has frequently acknowledged Randi as the one person he loved the most besides members of his family.

Jillette worked with high school classmate Michael Moschen in developing and performing a juggling act during the years immediately following their 1973 graduation. In 1973, Jillette graduated from Ringling Bros. and Barnum & Bailey Clown College. In 1974, he was introduced to Teller by Weir Chrisemer, a mutual friend. The three then formed a three-person act called Asparagus Valley Cultural Society which played their first act together on August 19, 1975, at the Minnesota Renaissance Festival, and later in San Francisco. In 1981, he and Teller teamed up as Penn & Teller, and went on to do a successful Off Broadway and later Broadway theatre show called "Penn & Teller" that toured nationally.

== Career ==
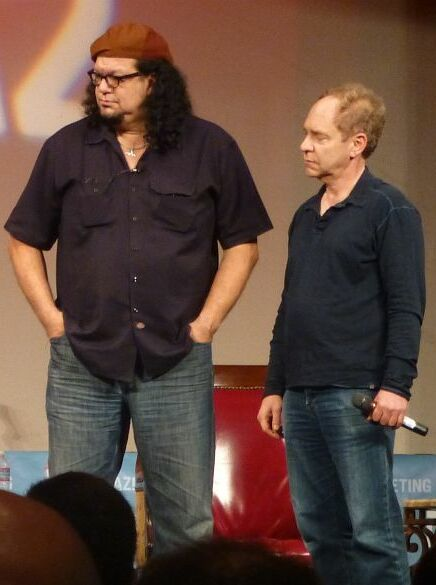
Penn & Teller in 2012

Jillette served as host and presenter of the first touring performance by avant-garde band the Residents in 1983. The performance (titled The Mole Show and based on their "Mole trilogy" of albums) featured Jillette coming out between songs telling long and intentionally pointless stories. The show was designed to appear to fall apart as it progressed; Jillette pretended to grow angrier with the crowd, and lighting effects and music would become increasingly chaotic, all building up to the point where he was dragged off stage and returned, handcuffed to a wheelchair, to deliver his last monologue. During one performance, an audience member assaulted Jillette while he was handcuffed to the wheelchair. In later years, Jillette would contribute to two documentary films about the Residents.

Jillette was a contributor to the now-defunct PC/Computing magazine, having a regular back-section column between 1990 and 1994.

Jillette was the primary voice announcer for the U.S.-based cable network Comedy Central in the 1990s through the early 2000s.

In 1994, Jillette purchased a house in the Las Vegas Valley and dubbed it "The Slammer". It has been featured in dozens of television shows and articles and was designed by his friend Colin Summers. He formerly recorded music there, and conducted his radio show at the studio inside "The Slammer". In 2016, he sold "The Slammer" so that his family could move to a less remote location.

Starting in 1996, Jillette had a recurring role on Sabrina the Teenage Witch as Drell, the head of the Witches' Council. He and Teller both appeared in the pilot with Debbie Harry as the third member of the council. The show was created by Jillette's friend Nell Scovell.

For a brief time in 1997, Jillette wrote bi-weekly dispatches for the search engine Excite.com. Each column ended with a pithy comment identifying which of the Penn & Teller duo he was. (For example: "Penn Jillette is the half of Penn & Teller that's detained at airports.") Jillette made a habit of linking many words in his online column to humorous websites that generally had nothing to do with the actual words. The columns are no longer available on the current Excite.com site, but have been republished with permission at PennAndTeller.com.

Starting in 2003, Jillette, along with Teller, began producing and hosting the show Penn & Teller: Bullshit! on Showtime. In the show, the two analyze cultural phenomena, debunk myths, criticize people and aspects of society they deem "bullshit" including ghost hunting, circumcision, astrology and lawns.

In 2005 with actor Paul Provenza, Jillette co-produced and co-directed The Aristocrats, a documentary film tracing the life of an obscene joke known as "The Aristocrats". It principally consists of a variety of comedians telling their own versions of the joke.

From January 3, 2006, to March 2, 2007, Jillette hosted, along with fellow atheist, skeptic, and juggler Michael Goudeau, a live, hour-long radio talk show broadcast on Free FM. The show, Penn Radio, broadcast from his Vintage Nudes Studio in his Las Vegas home. The most notable recurring segment of the show was "Monkey Tuesday" and later "The Pull of the Weasel". On March 2, 2007, Jillette announced that he would no longer be doing his radio show. He stated that he is a "show biz wimp" and decided to stop doing the show so he could spend more time with his children.

During the 2006–07 television season, Jillette hosted the prime-time game show Identity on NBC.

In 2008, Jillette was a contestant on Dancing with the Stars, paired with professional dancer Kym Johnson.

From 2010 to 2011, Jillette did a bi-weekly show on Revision3 called Penn Point.

On August 16, 2011, Jillette's book God, No! Signs You May Already Be An Atheist and Other Magical Tales was released and made the New York Times Best Sellers shortly after, in the week of August 28, in the 14th position.

An avid upright bassist, Jillette frequently accompanies jazz pianist Mike Jones, who opens for the magician's Las Vegas show. On March 16, 2018, Jones released a live jazz album with Jillette entitled The Show Before the Show which consisted of ten tracks played by the duo at the Rio Las Vegas. Jillette additionally performed at the famed Green Mill Cocktail Lounge to coincide with the album's debut.

Jillette was one of the contestants on The Celebrity Apprentice season 5, beginning on February 19, 2012. He was "fired" from the show by Donald Trump during the Week 11 episode. The same day, along with Michael Goudeau, he started the podcast Penn's Sunday School.

In 2013, he returned for the All-Star Celebrity Apprentice season, where he successfully made his way to the finale, raising $663,655 for the charity of his choice, Opportunity Village. On April 5, 2013, Penn and Teller were honored with a star on the Hollywood Walk of Fame in the live performance category. Their star, the 2,494th awarded, is near the star dedicated to Harry Houdini. The following day they were recognized by the Magic Castle with the "Magicians of the Year" award.

Jillette has credited magician and skeptical activist James Randi for his career. During an interview at TAM! 2012, Penn stated that "If not for Randi there would not be Penn & Teller as we are today." He went on to say that "Outside of my family... no one is more important in my life. Randi is everything to me."

== Business ventures ==
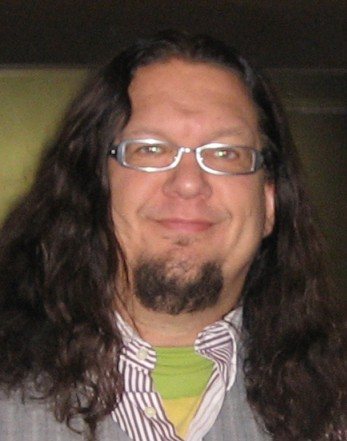
Jillette in 2007

=== 50 Skidillion Watts ===
From 1987 to 1989, Jillette provided financial support to David and Jad Fair of the art rock band Half Japanese for their record label 50 Skidillion Watts. This allowed the band to release the albums Music to Strip By, The Band That Would Be King and Charmed Life. When asked about his assistance Jillette said, "anybody who listens to Half Jap becomes a fan."

=== Jill-Jet ===
In July 1999, Jillette was granted U.S. patent 5,920,923 for the "Jill-Jet", a hot-tub jet specially angled for allowing a woman to masturbate against the water stream. The patent expired in September 2018. He has credited Debbie Harry of Blondie for suggesting the idea, as the two of them were once in a hot tub and Harry made a remark about changing the jets for a woman's pleasure. Jillette liked the idea enough to pursue a patent application at the USPTO under the patent title "Hydro-therapeutic Stimulator".

The abstract of the patent explains that a "discharge nozzle is located within the tub and connected to the outlet, mounted to the seat so that the discharged water from the circulation pump automatically aligns with and is directed to stimulation points (e.g., the clitoris) of the female user when the female user sits in the seat." An article in the June 2006 issue of Playboy shed additional light on the invention. Originally, it was to be called the "ClitJet"; however, that name was disallowed by the government.

=== Vintage Nudes Studio ===
Jillette created a private recording studio in his Las Vegas home. The addition, designed by Outside The Lines Studio and built by Crisci Custom Builders between October 2003 and June 2004 as part of his home, was named Vintage Nudes Studios by Jillette for playing cards that he had collected. The cards are displayed in the interior design in a manner which is meaningful to magicians. The studio was home to Free FM's Penn Radio show, and was the home of the Penn's Sunday School stream and podcast until it was demolished in 2016, along with his former home, "The Slammer".

== Personal life ==
=== Family ===
Jillette is married to Emily Jillette, and they have two children, Zolten and Moxie CrimeFighter Jillette.

=== Red fingernail ===
Jillette has told multiple stories regarding the red fingernail on his left hand. In one, Jillette's mother told him to get a manicure because people would be looking at his hands. In response to this, he had all of his nails painted red as a joke. Jillette has also claimed that the red fingernail provides excellent misdirection and is "just plain cool".

In direct response to questions about his red fingernail, Penn has stated "People are asking about my fingernail. Wear my Dad's ring and my Mom's nail polish. Just for remembrance and respect." On the podcast Skepticality in 2012, Jillette said that he was considering changing the meaning of the red nail polish, telling his child it is for them.

=== Health ===
Jillette says that he has an addictive personality and claims to have never had "so much as a puff of marijuana or a drop of alcohol" because he does not trust himself to do it in moderation.

In December 2014, Jillette's blood pressure caused him to be admitted to the hospital. By his birthday, March 5, 2015, he had lost 105 lb (48 kg). He follows Joel Fuhrman's nutritarian diet, which means that he eats little or no animal products, no processed grains, and no added sugar or salt. Jillette was featured in Eating You Alive, a 2016 American documentary about food and health. In an interview with Big Think in 2020, Jillette said he is a vegan.

=== Atheism ===
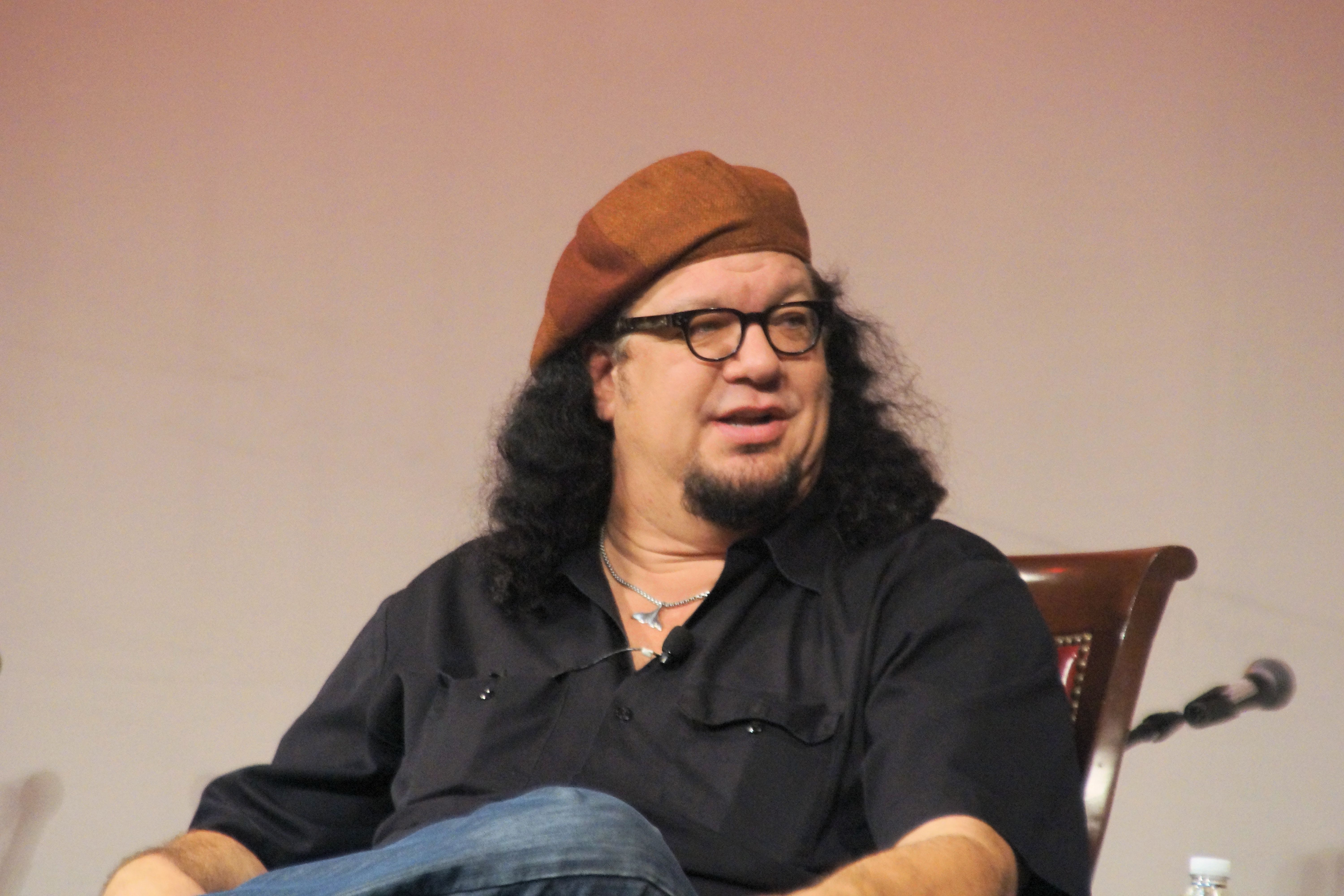
Jillette in 2012 at The Amazing Meeting in Las Vegas

Jillette identifies as an atheist. His cars' license plates read "ATHEIST", "NOGOD" and "GODLESS". He later recounted: "Strangely enough, they wouldn't give me 'INFIDEL'".

In 2005, he wrote and read an essay for National Public Radio claiming that he was "beyond atheism," stating "Atheism is not believing in God... I believe there is no God." His atheism, he has explained, has informed every aspect of his life and thoughts, and as such is as crucial to him as theistic beliefs are to the devout. Jillette encourages open discussion, debate, and proselytizing on the issue of God's existence, believing that the issue is too important for opinions about it to remain private. Jillette does not dismiss all who do believe in God: in a 2008 edition of his Penn Says podcast, he expresses his appreciation for a fan who brought him the gift of a pocket Gideon Bible after a performance because he realized that this individual sincerely cared enough about him to try to help him.

In January 2007, Jillette took the "Blasphemy Challenge" offered by the Rational Response Squad and publicly denied the existence of a holy spirit.

In 2016, Jillette said that "every sane person is" agnostic. In 2026, he said that he is agnostic from an epistemological standpoint of whether things can be known, and an atheist from a theological standpoint as he doesn't actively believe.

Jillette appeared in the 2019 Church of the SubGenius film J.R. 'Bob' Dobbs and the Church of the SubGenius, where he spoke positively of the parody religion.

=== Politics ===
Jillette has previously identified as a libertarian, and stated in 2003 that he may consider himself an anarcho-capitalist. He was a fellow at the libertarian think tank The Cato Institute.

In 2008, Jillette stated that there is not enough information to make an informed decision on global warming, that his gut told him it was not real, but his mind said that he cannot prove it. As of 2014, he has changed his position and now believes that climate change is occurring.

He stated in 2008 that he "always" votes libertarian, and endorsed Libertarian Party nominee Gary Johnson for president in 2012 and 2016. However, he participated in vote swapping in 2016 by voting for Democratic nominee Hillary Clinton in the swing state of Nevada, in exchange for "10 or 11" of his friends promising to vote for Johnson in blue states like California and New York.

In 2020, Jillette distanced himself from aspects of libertarianism, particularly surrounding COVID-19. In an interview with Big Think, he stated, "[A] lot of the illusions that I held dear, rugged individualism, individual freedoms, are coming back to bite us in the ass." He went on to elaborate, "[I]t seems like getting rid of the gatekeepers gave us Trump as president, and in the same breath, in the same wind, gave us not wearing masks, and maybe gave us a huge unpleasant amount of overt racism."

In a 2024 interview, he said he renounced his libertarianism as a result of the COVID-19 pandemic after a libertarian group asked him to speak at an anti-mask rally. In an interview with Cracked, he said, "The fact they sent me this email is something I need to be very ashamed of, and I need to change" adding "Many times when I identified as Libertarian, people said to me, 'It's just rich white guys that don't want to be told what to do,' and I had a zillion answers to that — and now that seems 100 percent accurate."

In the 2020 United States presidential election, Jillette endorsed Andrew Yang in the Democratic primary. In an op-ed for CNN after that year's general election, he stated that he "used to identify as Libertarian," but voted for Joe Biden. In a January 2024 interview, he stated regarding the upcoming presidential election: "I'm going to vote Democrat, maybe that's all you need to know. I will not vote for a third-party candidate."

== Filmography ==
=== Film ===
Year	Title	Role	Notes
1985	Savage Island	Security Guard	
1986	Off Beat	Norman	
1986	My Chauffeur	Bone	
1987	Tough Guys Don't Dance	Big Stoop	
1988	Gandahar	Chief of the Deformed	Voice; English dub
1989	Penn & Teller Get Killed	Himself	Also writer
1992	Twenty Twisted Questions	Narrator	
1993	Half Japanese – The Band That Would Be King	Himself	
1993	So I Married an Axe Murderer	Wedding Guest	Uncredited
1994	Car 54, Where Are You?	Luther	
1995	Hackers	Hal	
1995	Toy Story	TV Announcer	Voice
1998	Fear and Loathing in Las Vegas	Carnie Talker	
1999	Fantasia 2000	Himself	
2004	Michael Moore Hates America	Himself	
2005	The Aristocrats	Himself	Also director and executive producer
2005	¡Mucha Lucha!: The Return of El Maléfico	Various voices	Video
2009	The Growth	Dave	Voice; short
2009	Futurama: Into the Wild Green Yonder	Himself	Voice; video
2013	Tim's Vermeer	Himself	Also writer and producer
2014	An Honest Liar	Himself	
2015	Theory of Obscurity: A Film About the Residents	Himself	
2016	Director's Cut	Herbert Blount	Also writer and producer
2017	Sandy Wexler	Testimonial	
2019	J.R. 'Bob' Dobbs and the Church of the SubGenius	Himself	
2025	Marty Supreme	Hoff	
2026	Gail Daughtry and the Celebrity Sex Pass	Himself	Cameo

=== Television ===
Year	Title	Role	Notes
1985	Penn & Teller Go Public	Himself	Produced by Community Television of Southern California; Aired on Public Television stations
1985	Miami Vice	Jimmy Borges	Episode: "The Prodigal Son"
1987	Invisible Thread	Penn	TV short
1994	Lois & Clark: The New Adventures of Superman	Darrin Romick	Episode: "Illusions of Grandeur"
1994–1996	The Moxy Show	Flea	Voice; replaced by Chris Rock for The Moxy & Flea Show's sole episode
1995	VR.5	Mr. Orwell Kravitz	Episode: "Pilot"
1995–1997	The Drew Carey Show	Archibald Fenn	2 episodes
1996	Space Ghost Coast to Coast	Himself	Episode: "$20.01"
1996–1997	Sabrina the Teenage Witch	Drell	4 episodes
1997	Friends	Encyclopedia Salesman	Episode: "The One with the Cuffs"
1997	Nightmare Ned	Frank Grimes	Voice; episode: "Lucky Abe"
1998	Babylon 5	Rebo	Episode: "Day of the Dead"
1998	Dharma & Greg	Vincent	Episode: "The Cat's Out of the Bag"; uncredited
1998–1999	Penn & Teller's Sin City Spectacular	Himself	Also co-executive producer
1998–2004	Hollywood Squares	Himself	
1999	Home Improvement	Himself	Episode: "Knee Deep"
1999	V.I.P.	Himself	Episode: "Val the Hard Way"
1999–2000	Mickey Mouse Works	Pluto Devil	Voice; 2 episodes
1999, 2011	The Simpsons	Himself	Voice; episodes: "Hello Gutter, Hello Fadder", "The Great Simpsina"
2001	Just Shoot Me!	Terry	Episode: "The Proposal, Part 2"
2001	The Tick	Fiery Blaze	Episode: "The Big Leagues"; uncredited
2001–2002	House of Mouse	Pluto Devil	Voice; 2 episodes
2003	The Bernie Mac Show	Himself	Episode: "Magic Jordan"
2003	Las Vegas	Himself	Episode: "Luck Be a Lady"
2003–2010	Penn & Teller: Bullshit!	Himself	89 episodes; also writer and executive producer
2004	Girlfriends	Clem Valesco	Episode: "Porn to Write"
2004	The West Wing	Himself	Episode: "In the Room"
2005	Listen Up	Himself	Episode: "Last Vegas"
2006–2007	Identity	Himself	Host
2006–2017	Real Time with Bill Maher	Himself	3 episodes
2006	World Series of Poker	Himself	
2007	Handy Manny	Magic Marty	Episode: "Halloween/Squeeze's Magic Show"
2008	Dancing with the Stars	Himself	Season 6
2008	Numb3rs	Himself	Episode: "Magic Show"
2009	Glenn Beck	Himself	2 episodes
2010	The Defenders	Ruben Charters	Episode: "Whitten v. Fenlee"
2010	Fetch! with Ruff Ruffman	Himself	Episode: "You Can't Teach an Orange Dog New Tricks"
2010–2024	Hell's Kitchen	Himself	6 episodes
2011	Penn & Teller Tell a Lie	Himself	Also writer and executive producer
2011, 2015–present	Penn & Teller: Fool Us	Himself	173 episodes; also creator and executive producer
2012	The Cleveland Show	Magical Johnson	Voice; episode: "Brown Magic"
2012	Celebrity Apprentice 5	Himself	
2013	All-Star Celebrity Apprentice	Himself	
2013	In Bed with Joan	Himself	
2014	Rachael vs. Guy: Celebrity Cook-Off	Himself	
2014	Chopped Tournament of Stars	Himself	
2014	Celebrity Wife Swap	Himself	
2014	Alpha House	Himself	5 episodes
2014	Camp Stew	Himself	Host
2014	Penn Jillette's Street Cred	Himself	
2014	Deal with It	Himself	
2014–2015	Wizard Wars	Himself	Also executive producer
2015	Modern Family	Edward LeGrand	Episode: "Fight or Flight"
2015	Sharknado 3: Oh Hell No!	Lieutenant Colonel Stylo	TV movie
2015	King of the Nerds	Himself	
2015	Celebrity Jeopardy	Himself	
2015	Whose Line Is It Anyway?	Himself	
2016	Billions	Himself	Episode: "Naming Rights"
2016	The Eric Andre Show	Himself	Episode: "Jesse Williams; Jillian Michaels"
2016	Code Black	Johnny Prentiss	Episode: "Sleight of Hand"
2016–2018	Scorpion	Dr. Cecil P. Rizzuto	4 episodes
2017	Black Mirror		Episode: "Black Museum"; Credited with story idea based on Jillette's "The Pain Addict"
2017	The Late Show with Ewen Cameron	Himself	
2018	Crashing	Himself	Episode: "The Atheist"
2018	Deception	Himself	Episode: "Pilot"; uncredited
2018	The Grand Tour	Himself	
2019	Ridiculousness	Himself	
2019	Scooby-Doo and Guess Who?	Himself	Voice; episode: "The Cursed Cabinet of Professor Madds Markson!"
2020	How It Really Happened	Himself	Episode: "Siegfried & Roy Part 1: The Tiger Attack"
2020–2021	T.O.T.S.	The Great Who Who Dini	Voice; 2 episodes
2021	Nancy Drew	Himself	Episode: "The Warning of the Frozen Heart"
2022	The Masked Singer	Hydra	Season 7
2022	Britain's Got Talent: The Ultimate Magician	Himself (judge)	
2022	Young Sheldon	A.V.	Episode: "A Clogged Pore, a Little Spanish and the Future"
2023	Celebrity Wheel of Fortune	Himself	Celebrity contestant; 1 episode
2026	Stuart Fails to Save the Universe	Alternate version of self	Episode: "Spoiler: Gary Dies"

=== Video games ===
- Penn & Teller's Smoke and Mirrors (unreleased) ... Himself
- Steven Spielberg's Director's Chair (1996) ... Himself
- Borderlands 3 (2019) ... Pain (voice/appearance)
- Penn & Teller VR: Frankly Unfair, Unkind, Unnecessary & Underhanded (2019) ... Himself

== Music videos ==
- Ramones – "Something to Believe In" (1986)
- Run–D.M.C. – "It's Tricky" (1987)
- Too Much Joy – "Donna Everywhere" (1992)
- Katy Perry – "Waking Up in Vegas" (2009)
- Rascal Flatts – "Why Wait" (2010)
- Penn Jillette – "Clay Aiken" (2012)
- The Great Tomsoni & Co. – "This Time I've Got It" (2012)

== Music ==
- Ralph Records 10th Anniversary Radio Special! (1982) by Various / Penn Jillette
- Captain Howdy, a band which consisted of Jillette and Mark Kramer, released:
  - The Best Song Ever Written (single, 1993)
  - Tattoo of Blood (album, 1994)
  - Money Feeds My Music Machine (album, 1997)
- Bongos, Bass and Bob, a band which consisted of Jillette, Rob Elk and Dean J. Seal, released:
  - Never Mind the Sex Pistols, Here's Bongos Bass and Bob! (What on Earth Were They Thinking?) (album, 1988)
- The Horse You Rode In On by Pigface
- The Show Before the Show, a live jazz duo recording performed by Jillette and pianist Mike Jones at the Rio Las Vegas (album, 2018)
- Are You Sure You Three Guys Know What You're Doing? with Mike Jones and Jeff Hamilton on Capri Records (album, 2023)

== Bibliography ==
- Jillette, Penn (1989). Cruel Tricks for Dear Friends. New York: Villard. ISBN 0-394-75351-8.
- Jillette, Penn and Teller (1992). Penn and Teller's How to Play with Your Food. New York: Villard. ISBN 0-679-74311-1.
- Jillette, Penn and Teller (1997). Penn and Teller's How to Play in Traffic. Berkley Trade. ISBN 1-57297-293-9.
- Jillette, Penn (2004). Sock. New York: St. Martin's Griffin. ISBN 0-312-32805-2.
- Jillette, Penn (2005). How to Cheat Your Friends at Poker: The Wisdom of Dickie Richard. New York: St. Martin's Press. ISBN 0-312-36068-1.
- Jillette, Penn (2011). God, No!: Signs You May Already Be an Atheist and Other Magical Tales. New York: Simon & Schuster. ISBN 978-1-4516-1036-9.
- Jillette, Penn (2012). Every Day is an Atheist Holiday!: More Magical Tales from the Author of God, No!. New York: Blue Rider Press. ISBN 978-0-3991-6156-8.
- Jillette, Penn (2016). Presto!: How I Made Over 100 Pounds Disappear and Other Magical Tales. New York: Simon & Schuster. ISBN 978-1501140181.
- Jillette, Penn (2022). Random: A Novel. New York: Akashic Books. ISBN 978-1636140711.
- Jillette, Penn (2025). Felony Juggler: A Novel. New York: Akashic Books. ISBN 978-1-63614-238-8.

== Podcasts ==
- Penn Radio (January 2006 – March 2007), radioshow that was also podcasted
- Penn Says (January 2008 – April 2010), videolog on Crackle.com
- Penn Point (May 2010 – October 2011), videolog on Revision3.com
- Penn's Sunday School (February 2012 – present) at pennsundayschool.com
