= Pearls Daily =

American actress and filmmaker

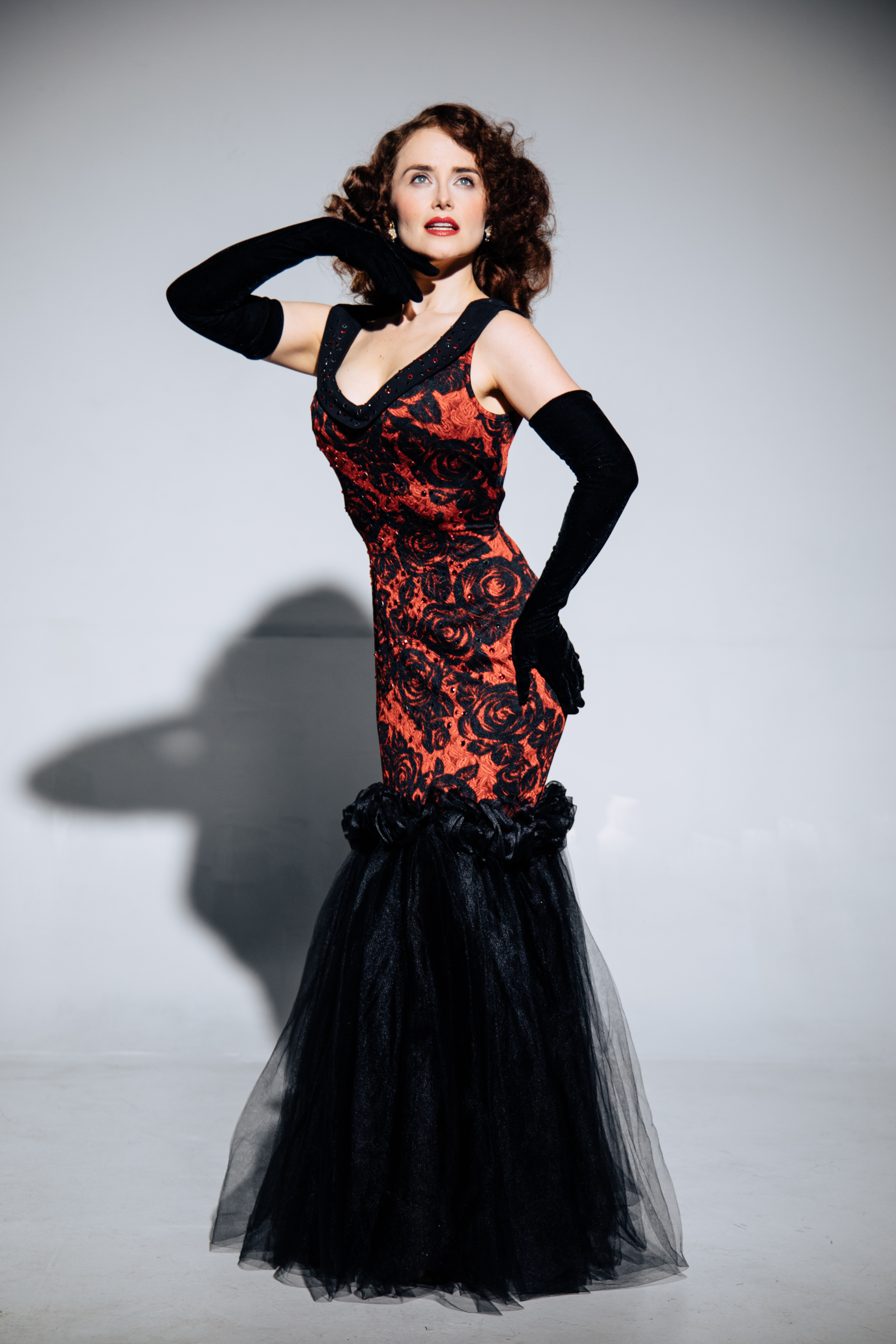
- Born: Brianna Hurley
- Other name: Brianna Woo
- Occupations: Actress, dancer, burlesque artist, filmmaker, model
- Years active: 2006–present
- Website: pearlsdaily.com

Pearls Daily (born Brianna Hurley) is an American actress, dancer, burlesque artist, filmmaker, and model. She has credits in theatre, film, television, and commercials.

== Career ==
Daily began her career under the name Brianna Hurley, and made one of her earliest professional appearances as part of the Disney Cruise Line, in the role of Snow White with The Golden Mickeys. She was a member of the 20th cast on Disney Magic from 2006 to 2007. This was Daily's professional debut, having studied at the American Musical and Dramatics Academy 2005–06, as part of the Integrated Musical Theater Program. Her past education also includes classes at the New England Ballet Company, The New York School of Burlesque, The Pearl Theatre Company, and studies in acting, sketch comedy, and Spolin technique with such instructors as Hal Peller, Gary Austin, Jacqueline and Kerry Donelli, and Conn Horgan.

Following a run with Teatro Jacó in Costa Rica, Daily made a move from Ensemble to a leading role of Mina "Margery" Crandon in the Teller-directed Todd Robbins production Play Dead. She played the role as part of the cast of the Geffen Playhouse production of the show.

Daily has a number of credits in reimagined stagings of Shakespeare plays with TP&co, including: Much Ado About Nothing, Macbeth, A Midsummer Night's Dream, The Taming of the Shrew, and The Two Gentlemen of Verona.

In 2015, Brianna Hurley officially began performing as Pearls Daily, the name by which she is best known, though she still receives occasional credits as Hurley.

Daily has been on the Production Team of the New York Burlesque Festival as Volunteer Coordinator since 2016, in addition to performing as part of the event. She is a member of Perle Noire's House of Noire, which won "Best Large Group" at The Burlesque Hall of Fame in 2017. The same year, she also performed in Filthy Gorgeous Burlesque with the dance company, an event highlighted in Time Out magazine. Also in 2017, Daily made an appearance on the award-winning television series The Marvelous Mrs. Maisel, in the role of Maxine. In line with her burlesque career, Daily was crowned Miss Coney Island in 2019. As Miss Coney Island 2019, Daily was also featured in the 37th Annual Mermaid Parade on Coney Island, and appeared on Manhattan Neighborhood Network for an hour-long interview entitled "Imagining Pearls of Burlesque" on The Radical Imagination. That same year, she had a featured role in I’m Not a Comedian…I’m Lenny Bruce, directed by Joe Mantegna.

Daily played the title role in Minky Woodcock: The Girl Who Handcuffed Houdini, an immersive theater production which brought the comics of Cynthia von Buhler to life. Buhler's character of Minky was visually modeled after Daily. Though most of the graphic novel is illustrated, Daily was featured on Cover No. 4 of the first Minky Woodcock comic, and she is the only individual to have portrayed a live-action depiction of the character. Daily was interviewed alongside Buhler and Hard Case Crime founder Charles Ardai at New York Comic Con in 2018.

The success of the first release resulted in a second publication of the series, Minky Woodcock: The Girl Who Electrified Tesla, which also featured Daily on the photographic cover. Daily previously worked with Buhler in the interactive Speakeasy Dollhouse show, Ziegfeld's Midnight Frolic.

Daily was in the cast of the 2020 Hey, It's Me, an Emmy-nominated sci-fi short film which is currently streaming on Dust.

Daily has played various characters in films since 2008, but ventured behind the camera to supplement her role in front of it as the Director and Producer of Briar, a horror/thriller film surrounding the character of Briar Hughes, a filmmaker with serial killer tendencies played by Daily herself. Her husband, cinematographer Arthur Woo, handled the lighting, camera, and coloring for the film. Briar was presented as part of the Awesome Con Short Film Festival in 2021 by Astray Productions. Briar was selected to appear at international film festivals, including The French Riviera Film Festival and the Coney Island Film Festival, and won awards for "Best Thriller", "Best Experimental Film", "Best Actress" and "Best Cinematography". Daily continues her work as a producer, most recently with the release of the film Layers in 2022.

Of her acting persona, Daily has said "I am here to change your mind about the girl next door. Inspired by the great actors of the silver screen, I am here to create characters that are not afraid to get dirty, play dirty and have impact. I am the unexpected leading lady".

Other on-screen appearances include commercials for Pepsi, Olay, Canon, Bergdorf Goodman, and Nat Nast, in addition to modeling spots in such publications as Moped Magazine, The Rev Magazine, Titan Comics, and EM Magazine.

Daily performed as part of fashion brand Selkie's Spring 2024 Show at the St. Regis New York rooftop ballroom during New York Fashion Week in September 2023.

Pearls Daily was awarded the title of "Queen of the Striptease 2024" at Teaser Festival in New Orleans.

Daily played the role of "Jesus" in Tiergarten, a cabaret revue from Andrew Ousley's Death of Classical, part of Carnegie Hall's "Fall of the Weimar Republic: Dancing on the Precipice" program. Tiergarten took place on April 17–19, 2024, directed by Ousley and hosted by Kim David Smith, who referred to Daily as one of his "most favorite burlesque performers".

== Credits ==
=== Theatre ===
Year	Title	Role	Notes
2007	The Golden Mickeys	Snow White	The Walt Disney Company, Disney Cruiseline
2011	Magnolia Day	Marie	Heather Lanza, New York, NY
2012	A Christmas Carol	Ghost of Christmas Past	Teatro Jaco, Costa Rica
2012	Hollow	Lady Von Tassel	Be Bold Productions, NY
2012	Alice in Wonderland	Alice	Literally Alive, The Players Theater
2012	Adapting	A543000	Heather Lanza, New York, NY
2012	Are you there Ann-Margret? It's Me!	Fantasy Ann-Margret/Ensemble	The Marjorie S. Deane Little Theater, New York, NY
2013	The Laundry War	The Girlfriend	Steve & Marie Sgouros Theatre
2013	Much Ado About Nothing	Beatrice	TP & Co, New York, NY
2013	Play Dead	Mina "Margery" Crandon	Teller, New York, NY
2014	Macbeth	Lady MacDuff/Witch	TP & Co, New York, NY
2015	For Madmen Only	Stevie	Chris Fink, Stage 48
2015	Ziegfelds Midnight Frolic	Martha Mansfield	The Liberty Theater
2015	Twelfth Night	Maria	TP & Co, New York, NY
2016	The Life + Death of Kenyon Phillips: Songs of Addiction	The Evil Nun	Cady Huffman, The Box
2018	The Illuminati Ball	Weird Sister/Dancer	Speakeasy Dollhouse, The Weylin
2018	Lady L’Amours Final Bow	Cheryl	Chad Austin, Duane Park
2019	I’m Not a Comedian…I’m Lenny Bruce	Self	The Box
2019	Minky Woodcock: The Girl Who Handcuffed Houdini	Minky Woodcock	Speakeasy Dollhouse, Theater 80
2022	The Last Goddess	Ava	Anthony Augello
2024	Tiergarten	Jesus	Andrew Ousley, Death of Classical

=== Film ===
Year	Title	Role	Notes
2008	Dying in the name of	Angel of Death	Greg Lemaire, New York, NY
2012	Shadows of Life	Meg	Anthony Laura, New York, NY
2015	Hide the Sausage	Tallulah	Trajectory Films
2015	The Pact	Martha Mansfield	Cynthia Von Buhler, Speakeasy Dollhouse, New York, NY
2019	Trust is a Flower	Sharon	Alexandra Warrick, New York, NY
2019	Silent Partners	Layla	Jokes Yanes, Miami, FL
2020	Return Haunted	Apple	Rob Gabe
2020	Checkmate	Violet	Waleed Sokkar, New York, NY
2020	Briar	Briar Hughes	Self-Directed, New York, NY (as Brianna Woo)
2020	Hey, It's Me	Zola	Courtney & Mark Sposato, New York, NY
2021	I’m Losing You	Mom	Houndstooth Studios
2021	Valerie	Lilith	Christin St. John, New York, NY
2021	Bad P.I.	Erica the Bartender	Coren Rhodes, New York, NY
2022	Layers		Producer
2023	Children of God	Diamond	Giò Crisafulli, New York, NY

=== Television ===
Year	Title	Role	Notes
2011	Pan Am	Parisian Nightclub Dancer	Christopher Misiano, New York, NY
2014	Royal Pains	Burlesque Dancer	Charles McClelland, New York, NY
2016	The Story of Us	Hairdresser	Richard Somes, New York, NY
2017	The Marvelous Mrs. Maisel	Maxine	Amy Sherman-Palladino, New York, NY
2019	Stripped	Teddy	Stephanie Michelle Bonner, New York, NY
2022	FBI	Stripper	Alex Zakrzewski/CBS, New York, NY
