= The Players Theatre =

Off-Broadway theatre in New York City

Coordinates: 40°43′49″N 74°00′02″W

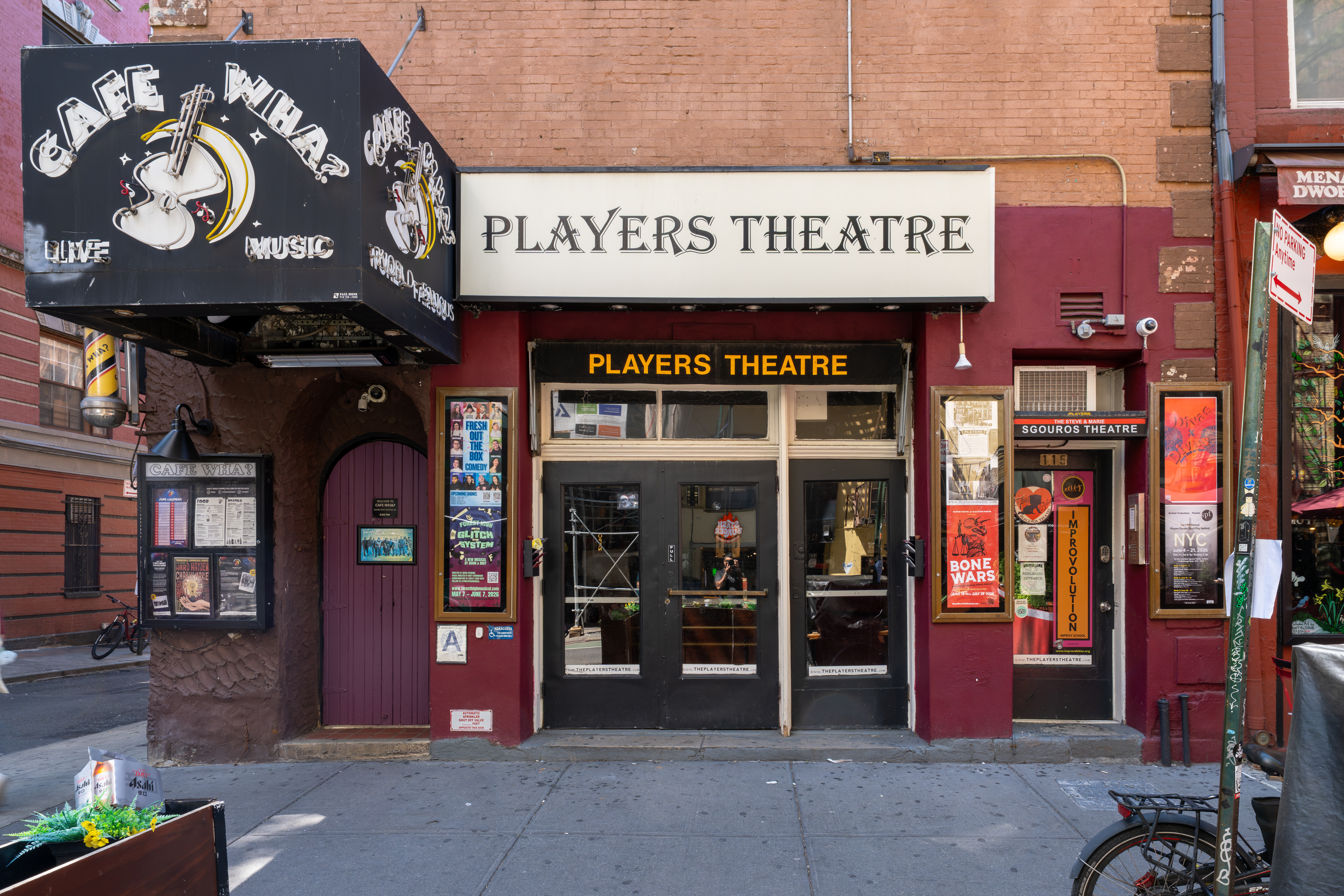
Players Theatre, next to Cafe Wha?, pictured in 2026

The Players Theatre, located at 115 MacDougal Street between West 3rd and Bleecker Streets in the West Village neighborhood of Manhattan, is one of the oldest commercial Off-Broadway theatres in operation in New York City. The Players Theatre contains a main stage with more than 200 seats and a 50-seat black box theatre, as well as four rehearsal rooms. The historic Cafe Wha? is located in its basement.

== History ==
It was built in 1907 as a carriage house where it served police horses until it was converted into a theatre in the late 1950s. Celebrities who have appeared on their stage including young Britney Spears and Natalie Portman in Ruthless! in 1992. In 2010 it served as the Off-Broadway home for Teller and Todd Robbins's Play Dead.
