= On Site Opera =

American opera company

On Site Opera (OSO) is a professional opera company based in New York City that specializes in site-specific productions. The company was founded in 2012 by General and Artistic Director Eric Einhorn and Executive Director/Producer Jessica Kiger. On Site Opera, a registered 501(c)(3) nonprofit organization, is member of Opera America and the New York Opera Alliance. After Einhorn stepped down, in 2023, the company appointed Piper Gunnarson as its next General Director & CEO and Sarah Meyers as Artistic Director.

In addition to site-specific productions, On Site Opera produces operas specifically for children, including a production of Shostakovich's The Tale of the Silly Baby Mouse, Op. 56, at the Bronx Zoo in 2012.

In 2014, On Site Opera was the first opera company to use Google Glass to display subtitles. Figaro Systems created the software in which the translation of Rameau's Pigmalion was sent to Google Glass, allowing the audience to experience opera and translation in their field of vision at the same time.

== Production history ==
- 2012: Dmitri Shostakovich's The Tale of the Silly Baby Mouse at the Bronx Zoo
- 2013: George Gershwin's Blue Monday at the Cotton Club at 626 W 125th Street in Harlem
- 2014: Jean-Philippe Rameau's Pigmalion at Madame Tussauds New York and the Lifestyle-Trimco mannequin showroom at 152 W 25th Street, Chelsea, Manhattan
- 2014: Frédéric Chaslin/P. H. Fisher's Clarimonde (based on "La Morte Amoureuse", developmental workshop) at St. Francis de Sales Catholic Church, Phoenicia, New York
- 2015: Giovanni Paisiello's Il barbiere di Siviglia (1782) at Edith Fabbri House (House of the Redeemer) at 7 East 95th Street, Upper East Side
- 2016: Marcos Portugal's The Marriage of Figaro at 632 Hudson Street (Manhattan)
- 2016: Dominick Argento's Miss Havisham's Wedding Night and Hector Berlioz's La mort de Cléopâtre at the Harmonie Club, Manhattan
- 2016: World premiere of Gregg Kallor's The Tell-Tale Heart for The Crypt Sessions at the Church of the Intercession, Harlem
- 2017: Mozart's The Secret Gardener, partnered with Atlanta Opera (New York and Atlanta premiere), at West Side Community Garden, Upper West Side; and Atlanta Botanical Garden
- 2017: Darius Milhaud's La mère coupable (US premiere) at The Garage, 611 West 50th Street, Manhattan
- 2017: World premiere of Rhoda and the Fossil Hunt by John Musto (about the granddaughter of Charles R. Knight), partnered with Lyric Opera of Chicago and Pittsburgh Opera, at the American Museum of Natural History, Manhattan
- 2018: Morning Star by Ricky Ian Gordon (the opera's second production), at Eldridge Street Synagogue
