= Kim David Smith =

Australian singer and cabaret performer

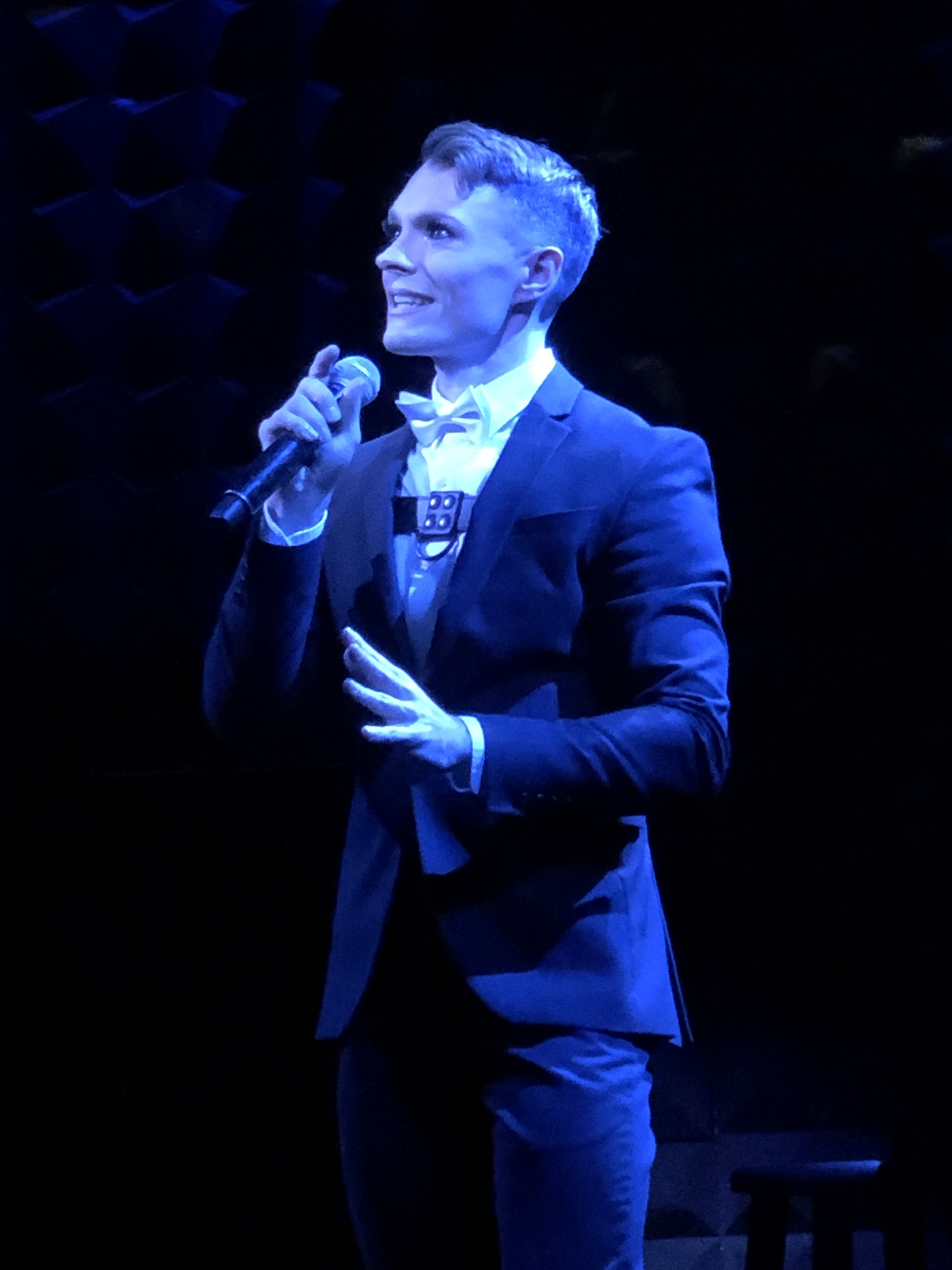
- Kim David Smith performing in "Kim Sings Kylie" at Joe's Pub, NYC (2018)

Background information
- Born: 1982 (age 43–44); Australia
- Origin: Ballarat, Victoria, Australia
- Genres: Cabaret, Electropop, Weimar revival
- Occupations: Singer, cabaret performer, actor
- Years active: 2000s–present
- Label: Ninthwave Records
- Website: kimdavidsmith.com

Kim David Smith (born 1982 or 1983 (age 42–43) is an Australian Helpmann Award-nominated singer and cabaret performer, known for performing Weimar-era inspired works that juxtapose authentic musical material with stylistic takes on current popular tunes. His recordings include electropop albums Nova and Supernova, written by Charlie Mason, and released by Ninthwave Records. Smith's solo cabaret program Morphium Kabarett enjoyed an acclaimed 2016 residency at Pangea in the East Village, Manhattan. Smith's debut cabaret album, Kim David Smith Live at Joe's Pub, was released Friday, 17 July 2020. Smith's Marlene Dietrich themed album, Mostly Marlene, was released Friday, March 21, 2025, with an album debut concert at Joe's Pub at the Public Theater, and features duets with Charles Busch, Joey Arias, Bright Light Bright Light, Ali McGregor, and Smith's mother, Linda Randall, and also features a performance of You're the Cream in My Coffee by Sidney Myer.

Smith studied Music Theatre at the Ballarat Arts Academy in Australia (BA, Music Theatre), and resides in New York City.

In 2009 Smith was presented with the Back Stage Bistro Award for Special Achievement as an Outstanding Performer (honored alongside Liza Minnelli and Charles Aznavour). Smith was nominated for 2009, 2010, 2011, 2012, and 2019 Manhattan Association of Cabaret (MAC) Awards in the Male Vocalist category, and was nominated in the Major Artist category of the same in 2024 and 2025. In 2015, he was invited to be part of the concert celebrating the 100th birthday of Édith Piaf at The Town Hall in New York City, produced by Daniel Nardicio.

Smith portrayed the Emcee in Hunter Foster's production of Cabaret at the Cape Playhouse in Dennis, Massachusetts, in 2016, and played Salome in Tristan Divincenzo's production of Oscar Wilde's Salome at the Provincetown Theater in 2017.

Smith debuted Kim Sings Kylie, his musical salute to fellow Australian Kylie Minogue, at Joe's Pub at the Public Theater on 25 June 2018 for New York City Pride. Kim Sings Kylie performed in Sydney, Australia at the inaugural Sydney Cabaret Festival in July 2019.

Smith's Marlene Dietrich-inspired program, Mostly Marlene, debuted at Club Cumming on 3 March 2020. Mostly Marlene was featured in Alan Cumming's Adelaide Cabaret Festival program, performing 24 and 25 June 2021 returning frequently to Club Cumming, the Post Office Cafe and Cabaret in Provincetown, MA, and to Joe's Pub at the Public Theater (2022, 2024), where he premiered a French translation of Kylie Minogue's Padam Padam by cabaret artist Gay Marshall.

Smith participated in Carnegie Hall's "Fall of the Weimar Republic: Dancing on the Edge of a Precipice" programme, giving a musical tour of Weimar-era works at the Metropolitan Museum of Art, on April 5, 2024, as part of the museum's "Artists on Artworks" series, and also served as Emcee for "Tiergarten," a co-production between Carnegie Hall and Andrew Ousley's Death of Classical, which performed April 17, 18, and 19, 2024.

Smith's Christmas cabaret, A Wery Weimar Christmas, debuted at Club Cumming 16 December 2019. A Wery Weimar Christmas returned to Club Cumming 16 and 18 December 2020, in a streamed, virtual performance produced by Club Cumming Productions, and featured special guest performances from Alexis Michelle, Boy Radio, and Natalie Joy Johnson. Longtime music collaborator Tracy Stark musically directed.
