= Shade Rupe =

American writer, editor, and filmmaker (born 1968)

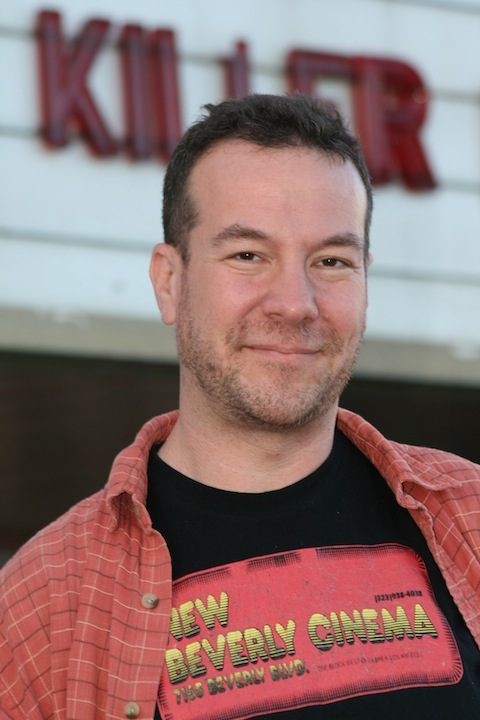
- Born: August 23, 1968 (age 57); Fullerton, California, U.S.
- Occupations: Writer, editor, filmmaker
- Notable credit: Play Dead (2010)
- Website: www.shaderupe.com

Shade Rupe (born August 23, 1968) is an American writer, editor, and filmmaker.

== Biography ==
Rupe created the two volumes of Funeral Party in 1995 and 1997. The first volume was edited and designed by Rupe, along with Michael Rorro and Marlene Leach, Volume Two features the work of Trevor Brown, Ulli Lommel, Miguel Ángel Martín, Jack Ketchum, George Kuchar and Mike Kuchar, Milo Sacchi, and Jack Stevenson, among others. In reviewing Volume Two, the cult film magazine Shock Cinema called Funeral Party "a beautiful work, loaded with artwork ... much of which is sure to offend ... and always pushing the envelope in an effort to shed light on the darker niches of human ecstasy."

As a writer, Rupe contributed over 40 reviews to the Scarecrow Video Guide, wrote articles for various underground and horror publications including Fangoria, Rue Morgue, Screem, Panik, and Timeless, and contributed to the French publication Tenebres for its special edition dedicated to American horror author Stephen King. He's also written online articles for Fangoria.com, Rue-Morgue.com, ShockTilYaDrop.com, and ComingSoon.net.

In 2010, Teller of Penn & Teller created a fantasmagoric spook show with Coney Island showman Todd Robbins entitled Play Dead. At the suggestion of filmmaker Ezekiel Zabrowski Teller asked if Shade could document the production, which led to Shade directing the filming of the live production during performances at the Players Theatre in Manhattan's Greenwich Village in July 2011. Edited by Teller into the finished film, Play Dead had its world premiere at the 16th Fantasia International Film Festival in Montreal, QC, July 27, 2012. Teller, Todd Robbins, and Shade Rupe appeared for the Q&A, which included Todd eating a lightbulb and Teller swallowing needles and regurgitating them strung up on a string. Play Dead was chosen as the Opening Night film of the 12th Annual Coney Island Film Festival, with Todd Robbins and Shade in attendance.

In 2011, Rupe released an anthology of 24 years of his interviews with such subjects as Udo Kier, Divine, Richard Kern, Tura Satana, Alejandro Jodorowsky, Hermann Nitsch, Teller of Penn & Teller, Dennis Cooper, Dame Darcy, Crispin Glover, Gaspar Noe, Johanna Went, and Brother Theodore, published by Headpress as Dark Stars Rising: Conversation from the Outer Realms. The book was positively received, with Serbian horror author Dejan Ognjanović remarking "These images almost literally burst from the paper in a subliminal, psychedelic manner, spilling from the edges of the pages into your surroundings and into your brain – altering them so that after reading this book you can't be the same person as before."

He made a minor appearance in the 2019 film Martin Scorsese film The Irishman.
