= Club Cumming =

Gay nightclub in New York

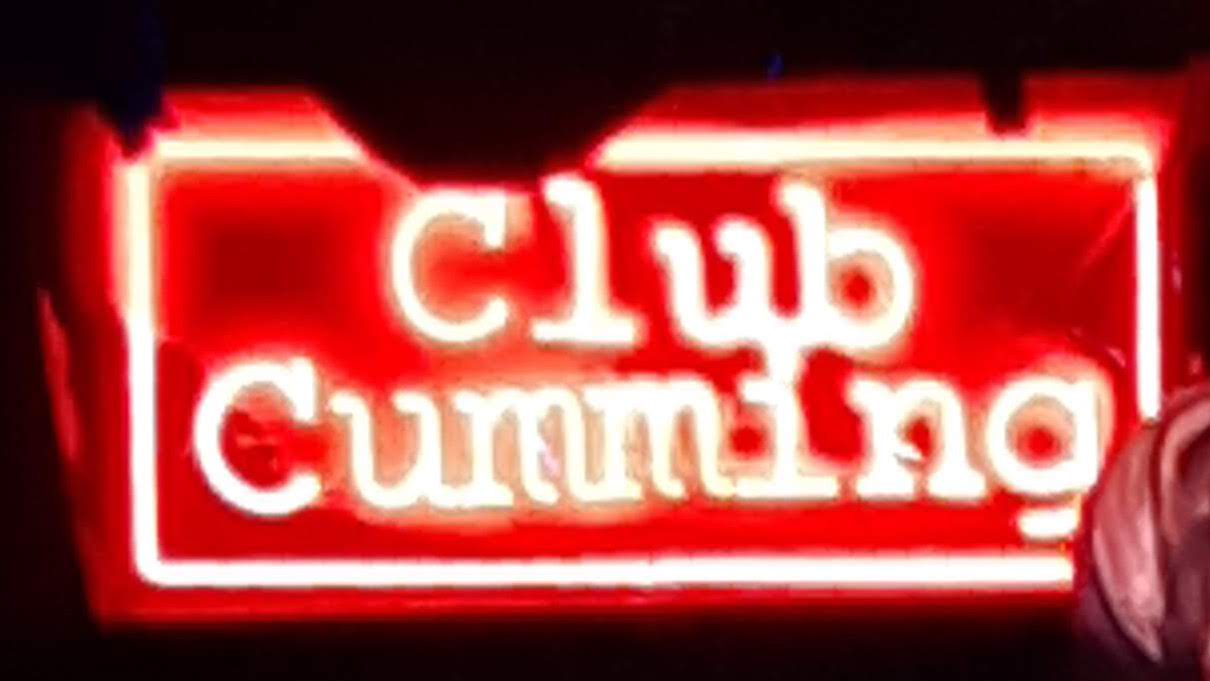
- Neon sign with Club Cumming's logo

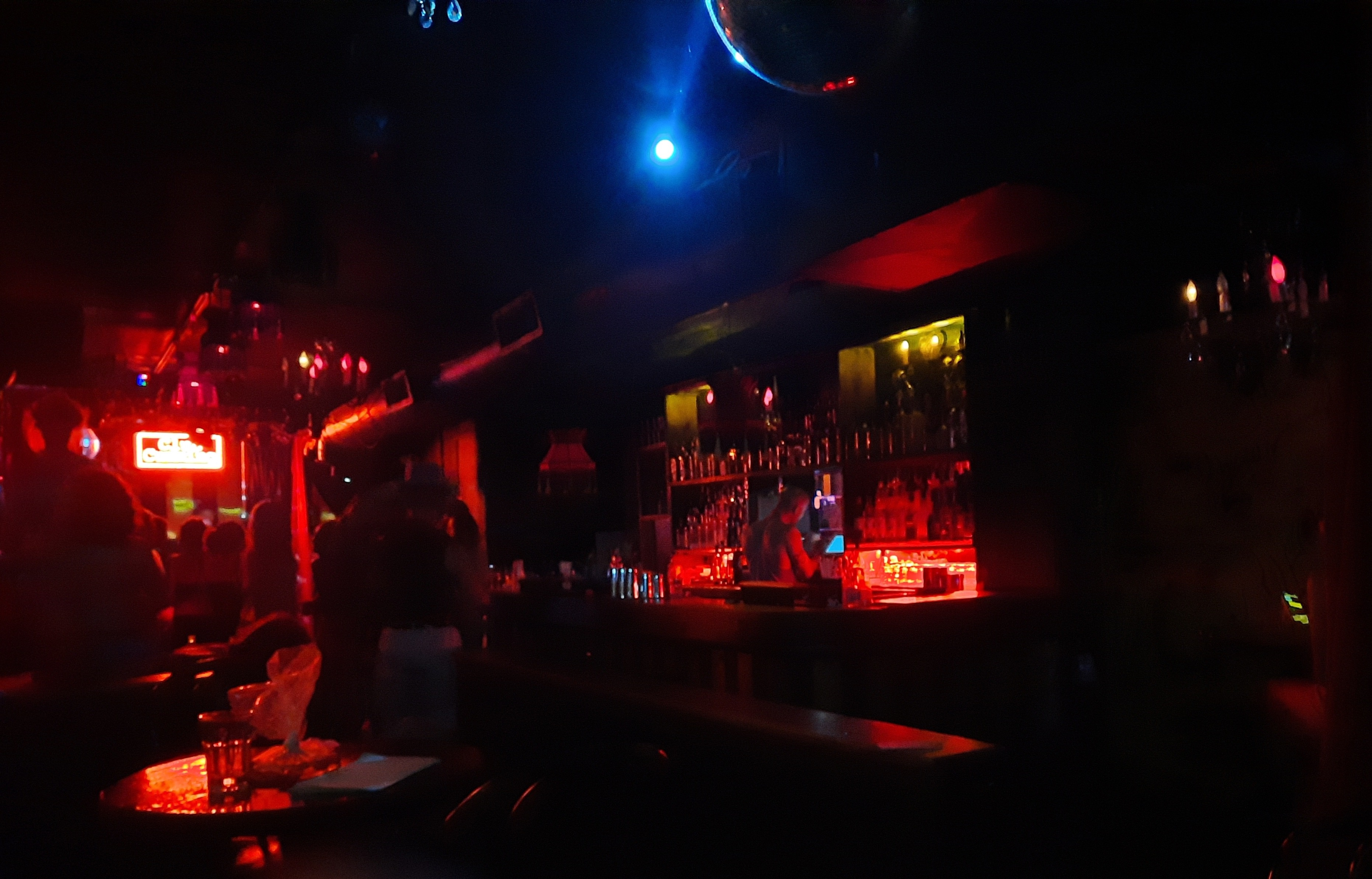
- The club's bar area, June 2021

- Location within Lower Manhattan
- Address: 505 East 6th Street
- Location: East Village, Manhattan, New York, US
- Coordinates: 40.7254°N 73.9834°W
- Owner: Alan Cumming; Daniel Nardicio; Darren Dryden; Ben Maisani
- Capacity: 100
- Type: Gay bar; nightclub
- Public transit: First Avenue station; Second Avenue station

Construction
- Opened: September 16, 2017

Website
- clubcummingnyc.com

Club Cumming is a gay bar and nightclub in the East Village neighborhood of Manhattan in New York City. It frequently hosts cabaret events, Broadway-style shows, dance parties and drag performances. Celebrities, especially Broadway actors, often make pop-up appearances there. The club opened in 2017 and is co-owned by actor Alan Cumming and promoter Daniel Nardicio, who founded it with the owners of the space's previous establishment. The bar was ordered to temporarily halt its shows in 2018, when it was discovered that its liquor license did not include a provision for live entertainment. The matter was resolved swiftly and with community support. The club was shuttered in March 2020 due to the COVID-19 pandemic, but it continued to host cabaret and comedy shows via live stream for most of the year. The venue reintroduced on-site outdoor events in December 2020 and reopened at full indoor capacity in May 2021. Club Cumming has generally been well received by critics, who cite its eclectic entertainment repertoire, its inclusivity and the spontaneity of its atmosphere.

== Description ==
The line-up is ... eclectic and edgy with weekly stand-up comedy (Wednesday’s Cabernet Cabaret), sexy 'boylesque,' drag revues, and plenty of surprise guests. On any given night, the entire company of Cats might waltz in and perform.

— GrandLife.com, on the club's atmosphere

Club Cumming's facade is made of black painted wood, and it is not marked by any signage on the street. The interior is more lavish, containing chandeliers, velvet drapes, and murals painted by the husband of Alan Cumming, who is the venue's namesake and one of its owners. One of the murals features Nashom Wooden, a longtime staple of the New York City queer nightlife scene, alongside Daniel Nardicio, a local promoter who is also co-owner of the bar. Of Club Cumming's clientele, The New York Times said, "On a recent Saturday night, the crowd was a tightly packed mix of neighborhood gay men in vintage T-shirts brushing up against Becky types in black and gender-non-conforming millennials wearing glittery tanks, colorful scarves and the occasional boa. It was sometimes hard to tell where the show ends and the audience begins." Gothamist describes the club as "a genuine hybrid of disco dance party and live music performance cabaret".

Every night features at least one event, among the most common of which are live music, DJ sets, lounge acts, drag shows, go-go dancing and "raunchy readings". On occasion, the venue also hosts classical music performances and Broadway acts, including some off-off-Broadway musicals. In addition to live entertainment, the bar used to host a weekly knitting circle called "Stitch and Bitch". It also holds book clubs, piano nights and a "gender-fluid dance party" called "Femme". Cumming lives nearby and stops in frequently; he is known to perform, tend bar, DJ, and mingle with the crowd when he does. While mobile devices are not prohibited inside, he discourages their use "to make people talk to each other instead of looking at their phones". Club Cumming is a popular stop for celebrities who visit New York City, and Broadway actors frequent the venue on Mondays, when their plays typically do not run.

== History ==
=== Background and opening ===
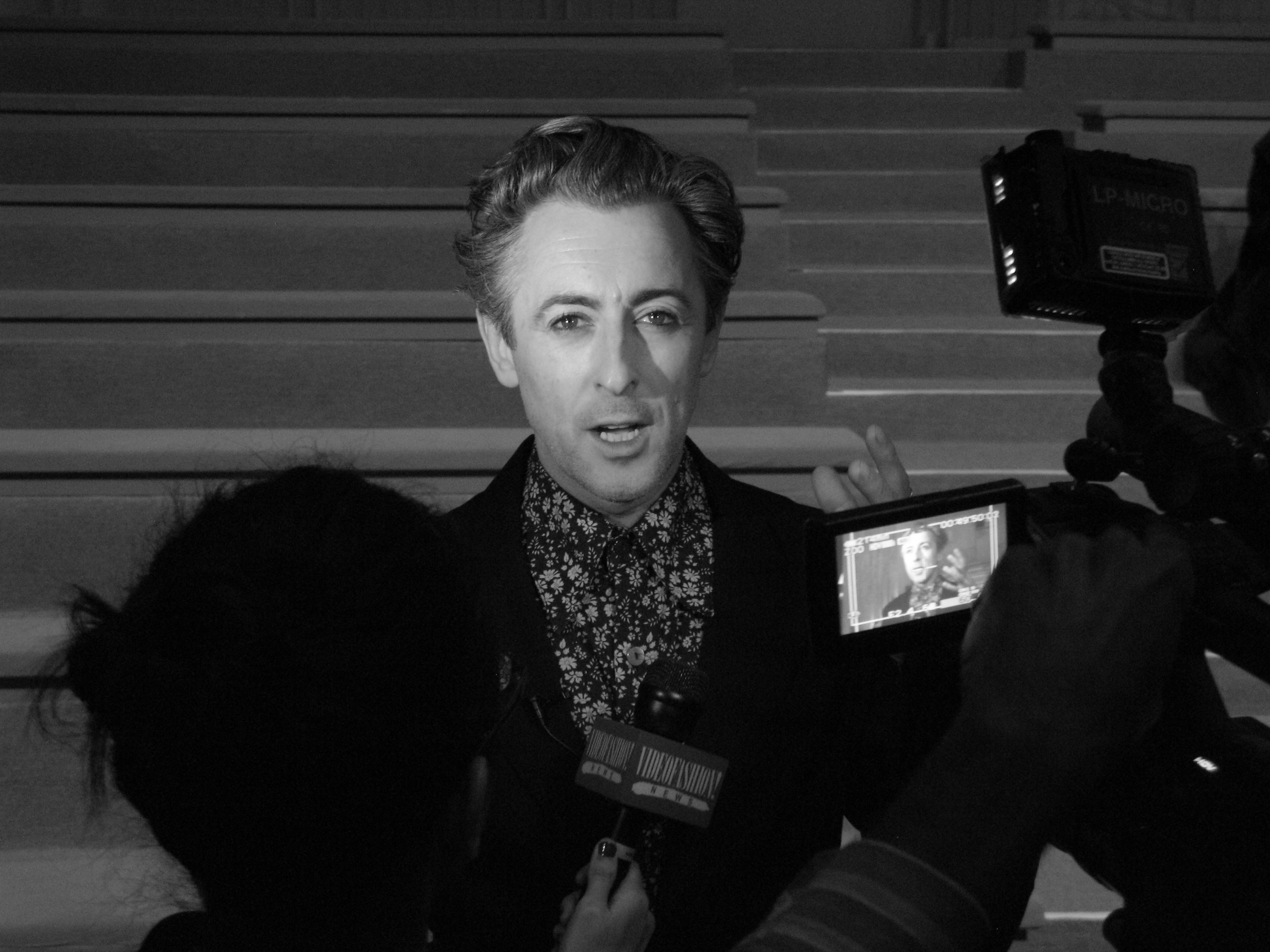
Alan Cumming founded Club Cumming in his Broadway dressing room.

While appearing in Cabaret on Broadway in 2014, Cumming ran a makeshift nightclub called Club Cumming in his dressing room. In early 2017, he and Nardicio bought out the owners of an existing bar, the Eastern Bloc, in Manhattan's East Village. They partnered with that venue's proprietors, Darren Dryden and Ben Maisani, to renovate the space and open a new establishment. Cumming's vision was for it to be a brick-and-mortar version of Club Cumming; he said he wanted it to be "a home for everyone of all ages, all genders, all sexualities, who all enjoy letting go and making some mischief. No judgments, no attitude, no rules, except kindness, acceptance and fun." Due to Cumming's high profile, Club Cumming began attracting press months before its debut. The week it opened in September 2017, Paul McCartney, Emma Stone and Cumming gave an impromptu performance of "Part of Your World" while spending an evening there. Since then, figures including Justin Vivian Bond, Billie Jean King, Adele, Jennifer Lawrence and Vanessa Williams have also made appearances.

=== Licensing incident ===
In February 2018, it came to light that Club Cumming had not acquired permission to host live events, and it was ordered to halt its shows. This was due to what Nardicio called "a rookie mistake": when he and Cumming had applied for the bar's liquor license, they had done so as an establishment without live entertainment. The state liquor authority received complaints from the local community board, and the authority charged Club Cumming with failure to conform. Cumming and Nardicio suspended the club's non-compliant events, and they asked fans and the bar's neighbors to show support by signing a petition, e-mailing the community board, or attending a board meeting. On April 9, members of the community came out "in droves" to one such meeting; Bedford+Bowery reported that more than a dozen people spoke on Club Cumming's behalf and that the room was so crowded that people were asked to wait outside the building. After hearing this testimony, the community board voted unanimously to extend the bar's licensing to cover live events, with the stipulation that such events not be ticketed or charge cover fees.

=== COVID-19 pandemic and George Floyd protests ===
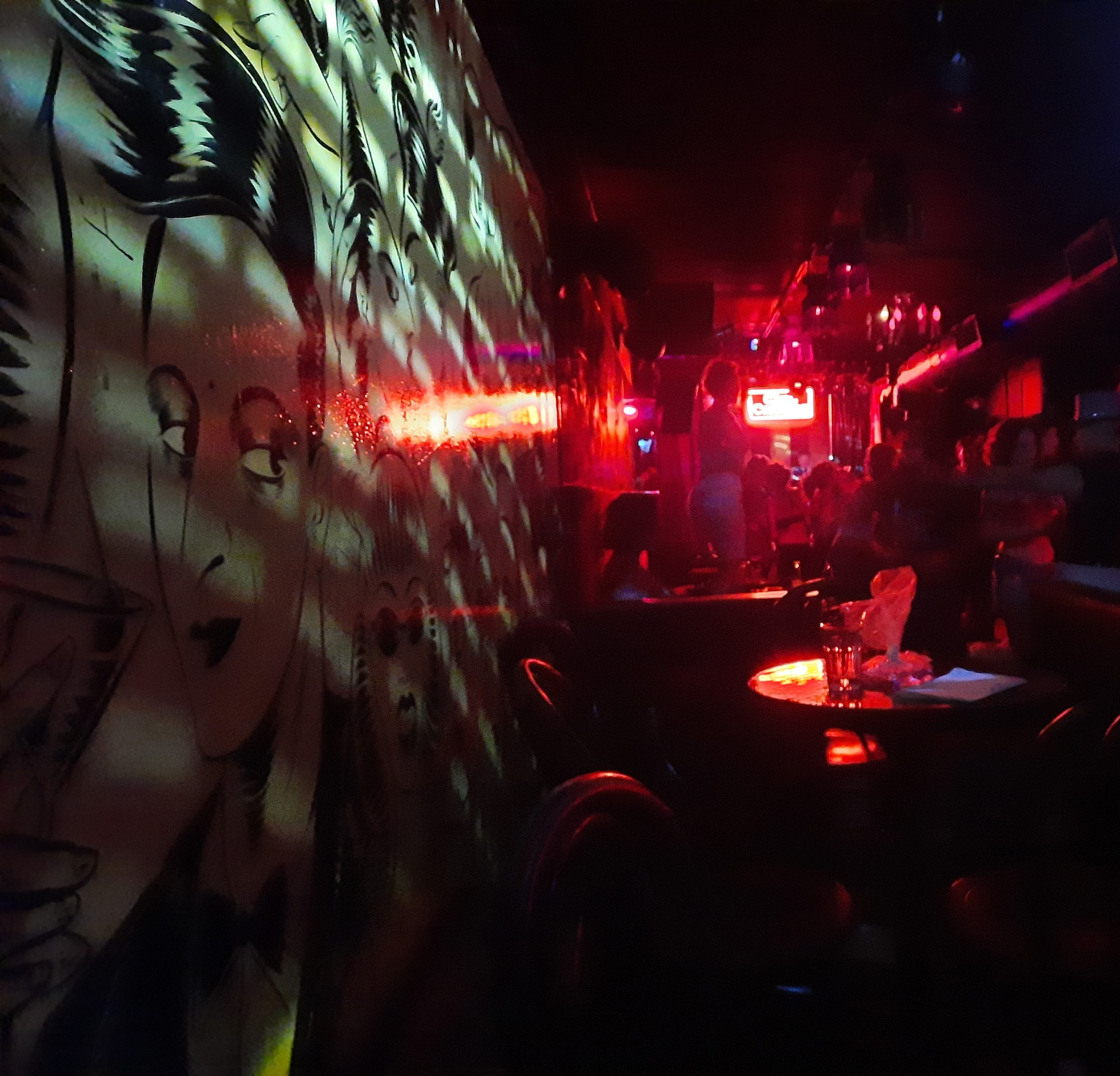
Indoor seating area beside the club's murals, June 2021

Club Cumming ceased operation in March 2020, when all New York City nightlife venues were ordered to shutter due to the COVID-19 pandemic. The same month, the club's weekly standup comedy show, Cabernet Cabaret, moved online. The first installment featured comedians Bowen Yang, Pat Regan, Mitra Jouhari, Sydnee Washington, Rachel Sennott and Joel Kim Booster. In April, Alan Cumming organized the Club Cumming Community Chest to support staff and performers out of work during the pandemic. The Community Chest was a fundraiser in which celebrities gave memorabilia or a Zoom call to the highest bidder, and the proceeds went to Club Cumming employees.

During the June 2020 George Floyd protests in New York City, the venue operated as a safe haven for Black Lives Matter protestors, providing shelter, first aid, and supplies like water and personal protective equipment. Cumming donated a portion of the Community Chest's funds to Black Lives Matter, and the club, which was not in the direct path of any protests, also stored supplies for demonstrators. The bar's manager, Samuel Benedict, said, "We've always had signs that say 'resist,' so us opening up our lobby for protests made sense for a lot of the patrons that our establishment attracts."

In August 2020, the club, still closed, debuted a live-streamed cabaret series. The seminal event was a two-night variety show hosted by Cumming; it featured performances by Kim David Smith, Catherine Cohen, Michael Musto, Alexis Michelle, Detox and Jill Sobule. The series' schedule through the fall included artists like Sharon Needles, Judy Gold and Ute Lemper. On New Year's Eve, Club Cumming held a socially distanced outdoor dinner celebration. Hosted by Kareem McJagger, the party featured entertainment by Dirty Martini, Emma Craig, Militia Vox and other local talent. Following this, the club began to host more on-site, outdoor events, including a party to commemorate the Inauguration of Joe Biden. Its Valentine's Day celebration featured Nicky Doll. Since reopening at full capacity in May 2021, the venue has required proof of vaccination against COVID-19 for entry.

== Reception ==
The tradition of downtown nightclub performance is rich but endangered, and Club Cumming is the East Village's best new addition in years: an oasis of creativity and community that draws from traditions of the past but is resolutely planted in the present.

— Adam Feldman, Time Out

Club Cumming has been well received by both the public and the nightlife industry. In 2019, it won the title of Best Bar at the Glam Awards, an annual ceremony à la the Oscars for queer entertainers, promoters and venues in New York City. The club ranked first on Time Out's 2022 list of "the 24 best gay bars in NYC". Gothamist wrote that the establishment "fills a niche that has been slowly eaten away by rising rents and sanitized street corners. Club Cumming attempts to fill the gap with a bit of imagination, served up with just the right amount of polish/un-polish." The New Yorker praised the bar for its inclusivity, stating that "[t]he tiny space welcomes a far broader spectrum of the queer community [than most queer nightlife venues] and overflows with a sense of inclusive camaraderie." That publication also noted a selection of events that had recently occurred at the club and complimented the spontaneity they injected into its atmosphere. Caroline Framke of Variety said, "The East Village bar reflects its owner's wonderfully bizarre taste." A GrandLife.com review reads, "No matter the night's curation, you're sure to have a wild time." ShermansTravel lists Club Cumming among "the best gay and queer bars in Manhattan".

== See also ==
- LGBT culture in New York City
