= Andrew Ousley =

Entrepreneur and creative professional

- Born: 1983 (age 42–43); New York, United States
- Occupations: Entrepreneur and creative professional
- Years active: 2015-Present
- Notable work: The Crypt Sessions; The Angel's Share

Andrew Ousley (born 1983) is an entrepreneur and creative professional, best known as the founder and artistic director of classical music and opera concert series The Crypt Sessions.

== Early life and education ==
Ousley was born in New York City, United States, in 1983. He was introduced to opera by his mother, Mary Ousley, at the age of 16.

== Career ==
In 2015, Ousley founded Unison Media, a public relations and marketing firm. While scouting locations for unconventional performance spaces, Ousley discovered a Crypt Chapel underneath the Church of the Intercession. By the end of 2015, Ousley launched the initial performances of The Crypt Sessions, a classical music concert series held in the Crypt.

Ousley has continued to present musical performances at The Church of the Intercession in Manhattan and Green-Wood Cemetery in, with notable invited artists such as The New York Philharmonic, violinist Gil Shaham, opera tenor Lawrence Brownlee, and pianist Conrad Tao.

The Crypt Sessions, an ongoing classical music concert series performed in the crypt of the Church of the Intercession, was launched by Ousley on November 4, 2015, with American composer and pianist Conrad Tao.

In 2018, Ousley launched the Angel's Share, a series of opera and chamber music concerts taking place in the Catacombs of the Green-Wood cemetery. Since 2020, the music concerts have been organized through Ousley's nonprofit company, the Death of Classical.
