= Daniel Nardicio =

American radio personality (born 1966)

Daniel Nardicio (born August 8, 1966, in Cleveland, Ohio) is an American producer, nightlife impresario, entrepreneur, and co-creator of the social network Dlist.com.

== Early life and education ==
Nardicio was born on August 8, 1966, into a working-class Italian American family. His uncle is Danny Nardico, the only boxer to beat Jake LaMotta.

At 17, Nardicio bounced around as an actor between San Francisco and Berlin before settling in New York City with his friend, cabaret singer Justin Vivian Bond. In 1990, Nardicio moved to Berlin where he worked as an opera singer and principal actor in such venues as the Bregenzer Festspiele and Theater des Westens. In 1995, he moved back to New York City to become an actor, only changing his mind after temping for a year and realizing: "As an actor you have no control over your career. I had to have more control over my life, so I went into nightlife."

== Career ==
=== Nightlife promoter and Dlist ===
In 2002, Nardicio opened the now notorious Slide Bar on the Bowery, making it into one of NYC's top ten gay destinations (according to The Village Voice's "Best Of" Issue, 2004).

At this time, he worked on various social media sites, including originating what would eventually become Dlist.com (from "Daniel's List", his original promotional email list), which at its peak was ranked the 6000th most popular site on the web. Nardicio created a weekly podcast called Dlist Radio that now has approximately 40,000 downloads on iTunes. In 2005, the podcast was voted as "Best Party Posing as An Internet Radio Show" by The Village Voice's "Best Of" issue in 2008, and was tied with Kathy Griffin's Dlist TV show downloads for listeners.

A decade of media work (including radio, Dlist.com, online TV, social networking, and parties) has led to Nardicio being best known as one of New York City's nightlife fixtures. He is personally responsible for producing nearly 1000 events, including The Saint at Large, Peaches, Sandra Bernhard in Concert, and his longtime collaboration of events with punk singer Nina Hagen. Noize Magazine said about his events: "You haven’t done New York Nightlife until you’ve done Nardicio". He has thrown some of NYC's most talked about and scandalous events, such as his Night at The Playgirl Mansion parties and his notorious Tigerbeat the Slide. The nature of these parties has earned him the monikers "The Gay Hugh Hefner" by gay media source Next Magazine, and "Sleaze Impresario" by New York Magazine.

He is credited with introducing international comic sensation Pam Ann to the United States. His Road Trip reality show pilot with Bianca Del Rio was an internet sensation in 2005 but was passed on by Logo TV as they "weren't interested in drag."

In the summer of 2012, he began his "Icon Series" with Liza Minnelli, who performed with actor and singer Alan Cumming on Fire Island, in the first ever pairing of the two Tony Award winners and stars of Cabaret. Since then, he has paired Carol Channing with cabaret singer Justin Vivian Bond and has extensively produced in New York City with such personalities as Joan Collins, John Waters, Chita Rivera, Margaret Cho, Peaches, Bridget Everett, Pam Ann, Christine Ebersole, Dina Martina and the New York Boylesque Festival. In February 2016, Nardicio brought Tony winner Alan Cumming to Carnegie Hall in "Alan Cumming Sings Sappy Songs With Friends." He followed this performance by bringing Chita Rivera's Carnegie Hall debut Nowadays to the stage in November 2017.

=== Europride ===
Nardicio was the first American to produce official Europride events at Europride Warsaw in 2010. He brought over transsexual singer Amanda Lepore, Lady Bunny, and Whitney Biennial artist Julie Atlas Muz, and a party with Boy George DJing. The events were disastrous. Nardicio was quoted as saying, "The homophobia in Poland was palpable - it was absolute chaos".

15 years ago, Nardicio started a Friday night party at Cherry Grove's Ice Palace, which is now Fire Island's longest-running weekly event to date. Fleshbot.com called it "the greatest weekly event in the world".

Nardicio has most recently opened shop in New Orleans via a new venture called Dworld Nola, to which he has brought John Waters, Dina Martina, Alan Cumming and Sandra Bernard.

=== Club Cumming, Bedlam, and Club Cumming Productions ===
In 2017, Nardicio opened Club Cumming in NYC's East Village with longtime friend Alan Cumming, and in 2018 he bought Bedlam, an East Village staple. He currently is working on his production company, Red Eye Productions.

=== Playgirl ===
In 2008 Nardicio was brought on to Playgirl magazine, where he convinced Levi Johnston, the former fiancé of Bristol Palin (Sarah Palin’s daughter), and father of Bristol's child, to pose for the notorious publication.

== Awards and recognition ==
In 2004, Time Out NY named Nardicio one of the 50 reasons to love New York, and in 2006 HX Magazine gave him "The Spirit of New York" award. In 2012, The Village Voice named him "Best Gay Promoter" in its annual "Best of" issue.

== Personal life ==
Nardicio resides in Manhattan.
