= Marcos Portugal =

Portuguese classical composer

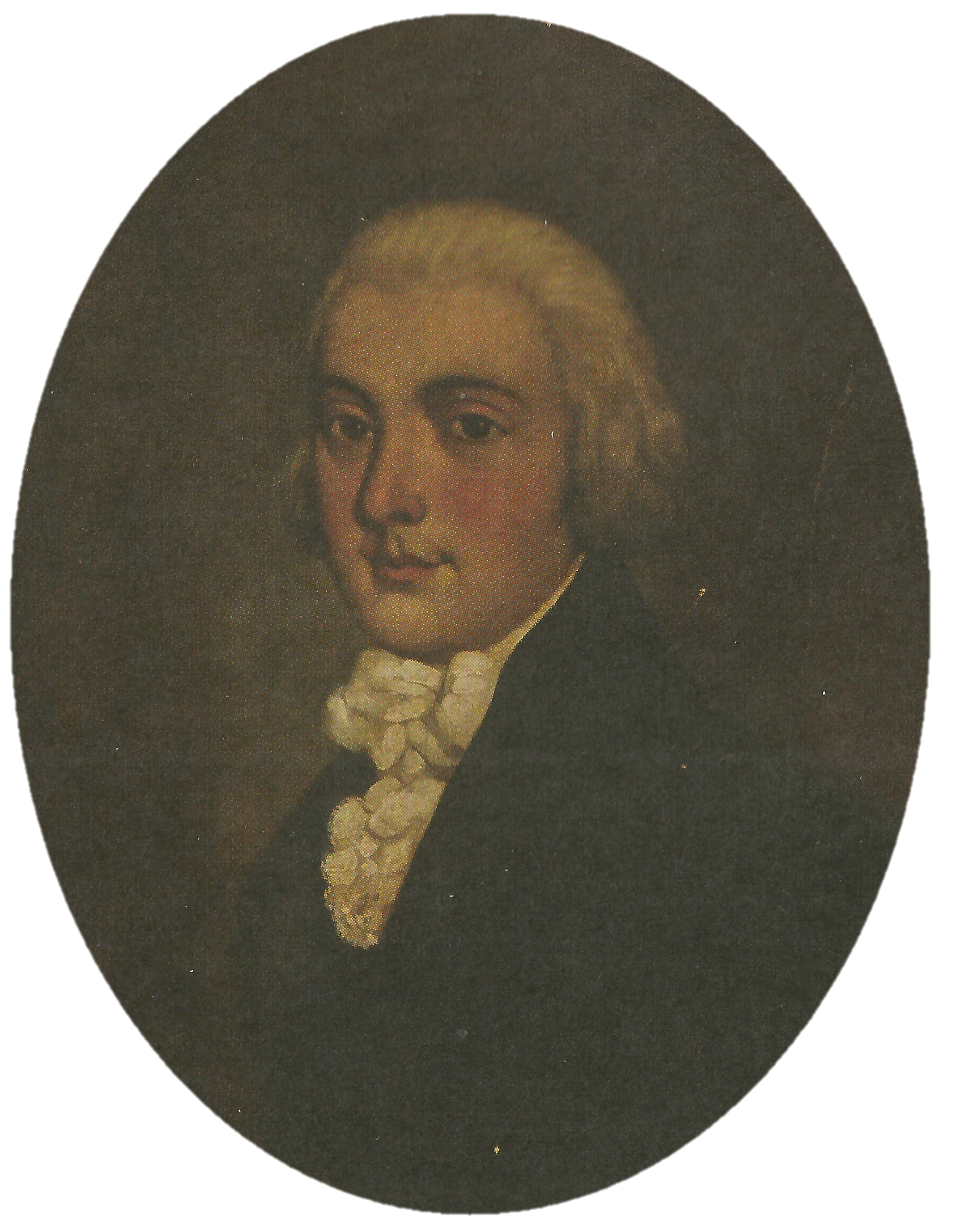
- Born: Marcos António da Fonseca Portugal; 24 March 1762; Lisbon, Portugal
- Died: 17 February 1830 (aged 67); Rio de Janeiro, Brazil
- Other name: Marco Portogallo
- Occupations: Composer, organist

Marcos António da Fonseca Portugal (24 March 1762 – 17 February 1830), also known as Marco Portogallo in Italian, was a Portuguese-Brazilian classical composer who achieved great international fame for his operas.

== Biography ==
Marcos António da Fonseca Portugal was born in Lisbon. He studied music at the Patriarchal Seminary in Lisbon where, as a 14-year-old student, he wrote his first work, a Miserere. He later worked as composer and organist at the Patriarchal See, and was maestro at the Theatre of Salitre in Lisbon from c. 1784. He lived in Italy from late 1792 to 1800, possibly funded by the prince regent D. John, the later King John VI of Portugal. He wrote 21 operas for various Italian theatres. The first, I due gobbi (also known as Confusioni della Somiglianza), premiered in Florence in the spring of 1793. His version of The Marriage of Figaro, titled La pazza giornata, ovvero Il matrimonio di Figaro (The Crazy Day, or The Marriage of Figaro), to a libretto by Gaetano Rossi, premiered in Venice in 1799. Like most theatre composers of the time, Portugal set several librettos that had proven successful for earlier operas, such as Metastasio's Demofoonte (premièred at La Scala, Milan, in 1794) and Artaserse; he set many stories that had been used before, including Serse, Alceste, Adrasto, Semiramide and Sofonisba.

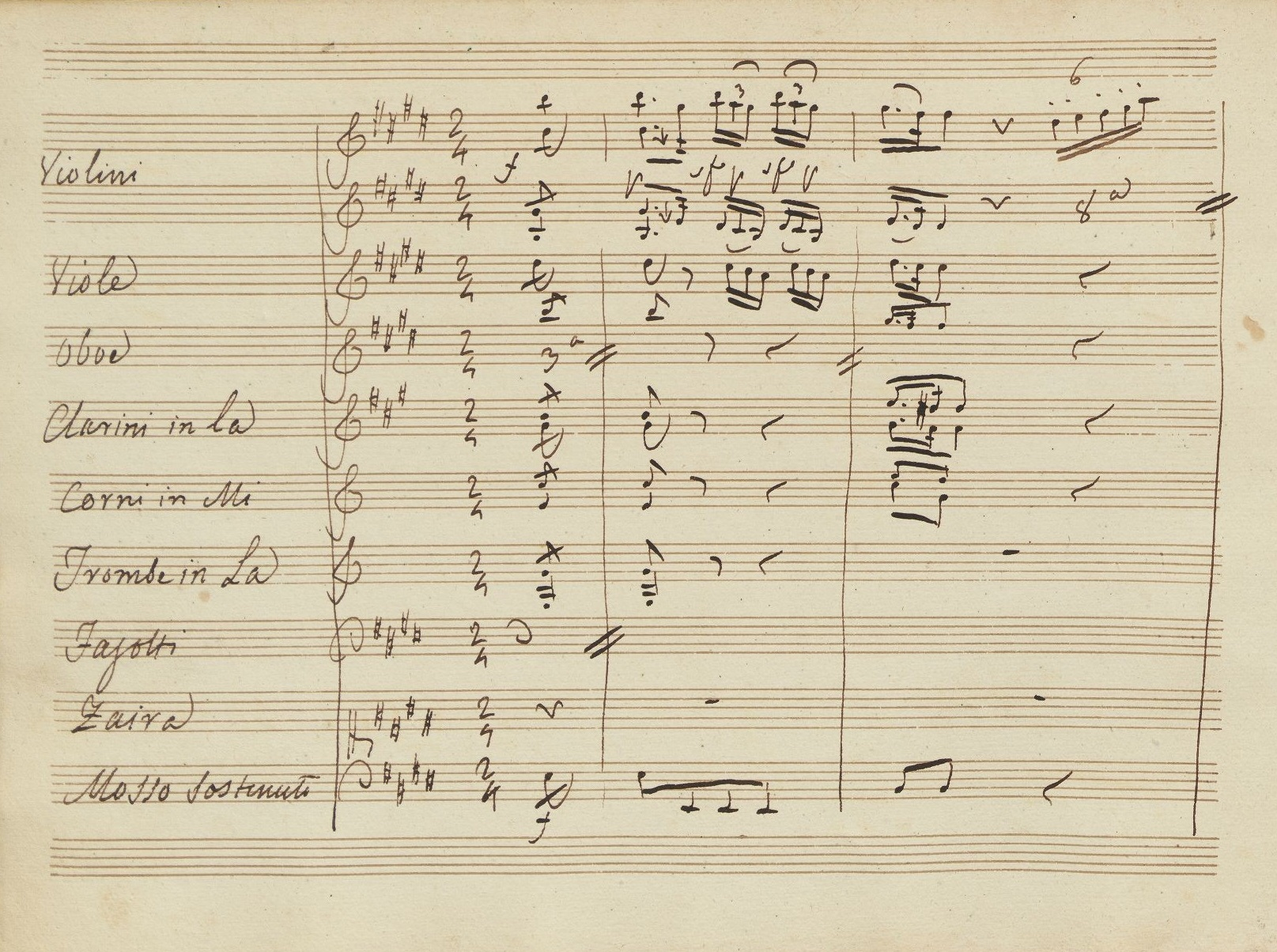
Page from Portugal's manuscript of Zaira (1802)

Marcos Portugal returned to Portugal in 1800. He became maestro at the São Carlos National Theatre in Lisbon and was appointed music master at the Patriarchal Seminary in Lisbon. He continued to write operas, mainly opere serie, and a large number of religious works, until the Prince Regent summoned him to the Portuguese colony of Brazil in 1811. Upon arriving, Portugal was appointed music master to the sons and daughters of the Prince Regent and became the official Royal Composer.

He wrote mainly religious music until at least 1824, the date of his last known surviving autograph. In Portugal and Brazil, his reputation rests mainly on his religious music, a genre he cultivated throughout his life. He remained in Rio de Janeiro when the Portuguese Court returned to Portugal in 1821, and continuing in the employ of his pupil, the First Emperor of Brazil, D. Pedro, as he had previously served his father, King John VI of Portugal. He died as a Brazilian citizen in Rio de Janeiro in 1830.

He authored the first official national anthems of Portugal (Hymno Patriótico, 1809) and Brazil (Hino da Independência, 1822).

In 2010, Bampton Classical Opera presented the UK première of Portugal's The Marriage of Figaro. On Site Opera produced this work's North American premiere in 2016. In 2023, In the Mateus Palace announced the return of the opera Le donne cambiate from Marcos Portugal as the most affirmative milestone of the XXXI edition of the International Summer Meetings. The performance had an international cast, musical direction of Ricardo Bernardes and stage direction of Nicolás Isasi. It was the first time that it was performed with period instruments and in a Portuguese version together with the Mateus Baroque Orchestra at the Teatro de Vila Real.
