= Play Dead (show) =

Off-broadway theatrical production

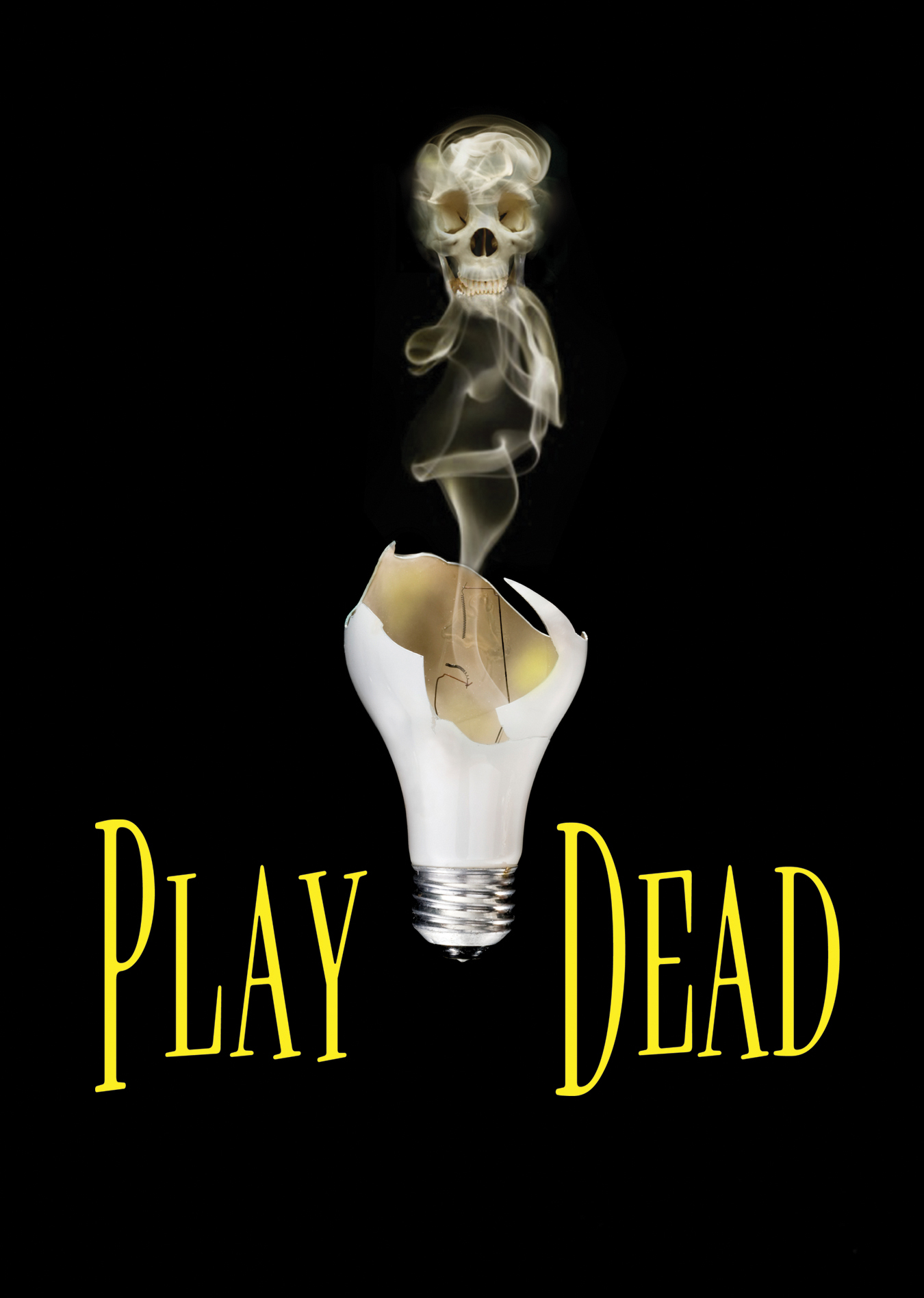
- Original language: English
- Written by: Todd Robbins and Teller
- Music by: Gary Stockdale
- Characters: Todd Robbins; Mina Crandon; Eusapia Palladino; Albert Fish; Girl
- Subject: Death, Deception, Spiritualism, Evil
- Genre: Thriller

Premiere
- Date: November 10, 2010
- Place: Players Theatre; New York City, New York
- www.playdeadnyc.com

Play Dead is a 2010 Off-Broadway show co-written by magicians Todd Robbins and Teller, the latter best known as the non-speaking half of the illusionist duo Penn & Teller. The show also features Charlotte Pines as Margery Crandon, Geri Berman as Eusapia Palladino, Don Meehan as Albert Fish, and Drea Lorraine as Phantoms.

The opening minutes of the show are performed in complete darkness, and the show itself features carefully crafted tricks and illusions ranging from killing a real audience member, to contact with the dead. The show stars Robbins as the narrator and is directed by Teller. This incarnation of Play Dead began with two weeks of workshop performances at The Calypso Room in Las Vegas in September, 2010, at the Rio, the home of Penn and Teller. Teller told the opening night audience that the show marked the first time ever that a show was created in Las Vegas to bring to New York, and was headed directly for an off-broadway venue in New York City. It opened for previews on October 21, 2010, and opened officially November 10, 2010 at The Players Theatre on MacDougal Street in Greenwich Village. The show ran Tuesday to Friday at 8pm, Saturday at 7 and 10pm, and Sunday at 3 and 7pm. Various members of the cast greeted the audience as they exited through the lobby.

During the last performances of the Off-Broadway show, Teller hired New York filmmaker Shade Rupe to document the show. After receiving the material, Teller and editor Emery Emery crafted the material into a finished performance film, which world premiered to great acclaim for a sold-out crowd on July 27, 2012, at the 16th Fantasia Film Festival in Montreal, QC. Teller, Todd Robbins, and Shade Rupe appeared for the Q&A, which included Todd eating a lightbulb and Teller swallowing needles and regurgitating them strung up on a string.

In 2013, Teller and Robbins brought the production to The Geffen Playhouse in Los Angeles, with a cast including: Todd Robbins, Julie Marie Hassett, Pearls Daily (credited as Brianna Hurley), Shar Mayer, and Rick Williamson.

== Reception ==
The New York Times noted the gruesome nature of the show but added "this wild, wicked show is not just a screamfest after all; it’s a pretty good piece of theater."

== Production credits ==
These credits relate to the Off Broadway production

- Writers: Teller, Todd Robbins
- Narrator: Todd Robbins
- Margery: Charlotte Pines
- Eusapia: Geri Berman
- Albert Fish: Don Meehan
- Girl: Drea Lorraine
- Scenic design: David Korins
- Lighting design: Thom Weaver
- Sound design: by Leon Rothenberg
- Magic Consultant: Johnny Thompson
- Original music: Gary Stockdale
- Associate director: Jim Millan
- Produced by Alan Schuster, Cheryl Wiesenfeld, Frank & Jono Gero, Pat Blake and Ethan Silverman
- Production Stage Manager: Maggie Sinak
- Production Sound Engineer: Reece Nunez
- Assistant Stage Manager: Amanda Sheets
