= The Crypt Sessions =

Classical music concert series in Harlem, New York City

The Crypt Sessions is a classical music concert series that takes place in the crypt of the Church of the Intercession in Harlem, New York City. Created by Andrew Ousley of Unison Media, The Crypt Sessions debuted on November 4, 2015, with American composer and pianist Conrad Tao.

Described as one of the “most evocative” and “intimate” spaces for classical music, The Crypt Sessions has presented a variety of performances from contemporary opera, jazz and spoken words, two pianos, string quartet, gospel music, to solo recitals featuring traditional repertoire such as Bach's Goldberg Variations and Complete Cello Suites.

== Season 1 (2015 - 2016) ==
- Conrad Tao
- Lawrence Brownlee
- Alexandre Tharaud
- Haskell Small
- Attacca Quartet
- Christina and Michelle Naughton
- Matt Haimovitz
- The Tell-Tale Heart / Gregg Kallor (World Premiere)

== Season 2 (2017 - present) ==
- Lara Downes
- Conrad Tao (Originally David Greilsammer)
- Joshua Roman
- Elizabeth Cree / Kevin Puts (Preview)

== See also ==
- Death of Classical
