= Pam Ann =

Australian comedian

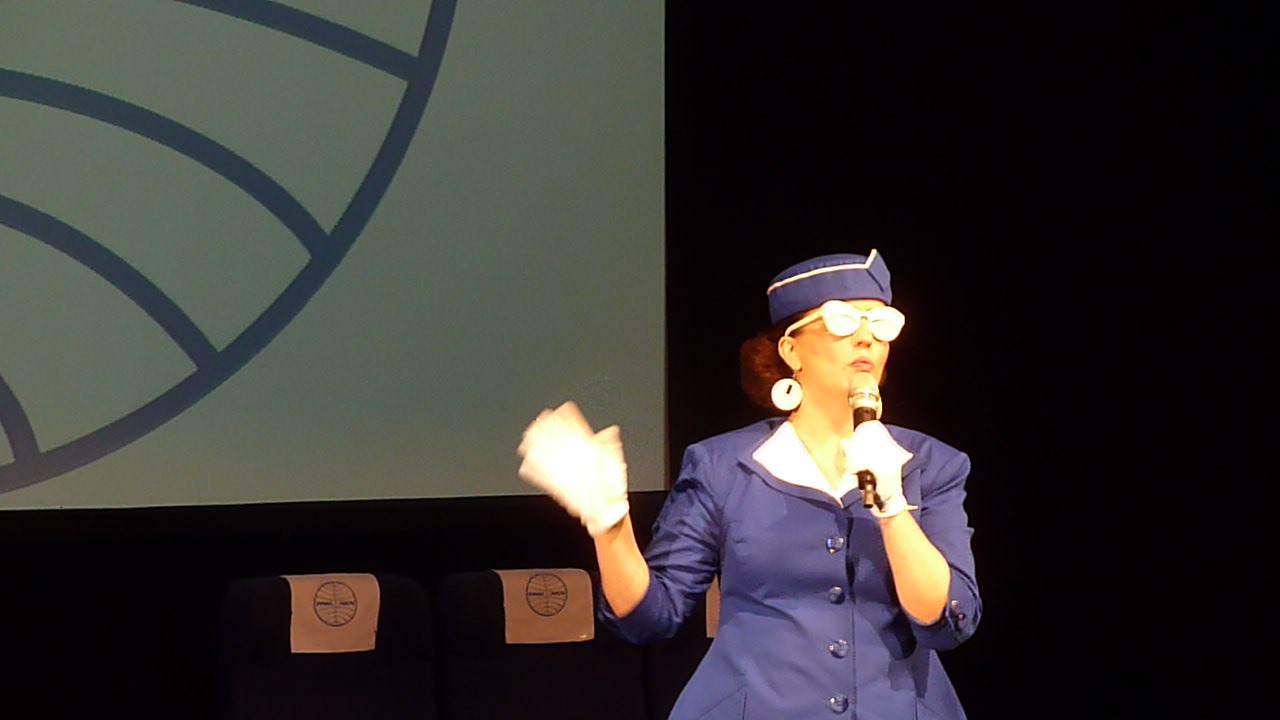
- Pam Ann in 2012
- Born: Caroline Reid; Melbourne, Australia

Comedy career
- Years active: 1996–present
- Medium: Stand-up; television
- Genres: Character comedy; blue comedy; observational comedy; sketch comedy; satire
- Website: pamann.com

Pam Ann is the air hostess alter ego of Australian comedian Caroline Reid. Performances focus on the nuances of air travel, identifying the individual quirks of some of the biggest international airlines and their media stereotypes. The character of Pam Ann has developed a cult-like following.

The name Pam Ann is a play on words from Pan Am. In her shows, she refers to the so-called memories of the "Golden Age of Aviation" (for her, the period between the late 1950s and early 1970s when the jet airplanes entered widespread use), often contrasting it with modern times, and visual/social changes like the lack of knives and glass on board. Overall, it's observational comedy of airlines using her own extensive travel experiences.

Pam Ann has been featured in an advertising campaign for British Airways with over 1.25m views in a six-week period. Qantas had Pam Ann's Live DVD Come Fly with Me in their in-flight programming.

In 2010, Pam Ann provided in-flight service on JetBlue and JetPride flight which was a first on any US carrier operating from San Francisco to Long Beach for the Long Beach Pride.

In 2010, Reid prepared to expand Pam Ann's notoriety to the U.S., relocating to New York and in 2016, moved to Miami where she expanded her repertoire to DJ Pam Ann.

In 2012, Pam Ann also made an advertisement for Scandinavian Airlines, showing how she wants to make Pam Ann Airlines more like Scandinavian.

== Tours ==
Pam Ann has circumnavigated the world on over 10 world tours, which included the United Kingdom, Ireland, Australia, Hong Kong, USA, Germany, Israel, Netherlands, Denmark, Poland, Austria, Switzerland, Sweden, Iceland, Norway, Finland, Belgium, France and Canada.

Shows and Tours have included:

- In Bed With Pam Ann And Friends (2006)
- Pam Ann: Fly
- Pam Ann: Come Fly With Me (2007) – DVD
- Pam Ann: One World Alliance (2007)
- Pam Ann: Terror at 41,000 Feet (2008)
- Pam Ann – Flying High (Vaudeville 2010)
- You F'Coffee (2011)
- Pam Ann: Around The World (2013)
- Buckle up Bitches (2016)
- Pam Ann: Touch Trolley Run to Galley (2017)
- Pam Ann: Queen Of The Sky (Leicester Square Theatre)
- Pam Ann Returns (2019)

== Other appearances ==
Pam Ann performed in-flight entertainment for the 40th birthday of David Furnish, partner of the musician Elton John. She also accompanied Cher as her support act on her farewell tour in 2004 in the UK & Ireland.

In 2002, Pam Ann made a guest appearance on The Weakest Link – Drag Queen's edition

In 2009 she hosted Australia’s live broadcast of Mardi Gras 2009, airing in over 2 million households. In addition to her Australian citizenship, she obtained British citizenship by descent via her mother who is a native of Cheshire, and became a naturalized U.S. citizen in 2022.

== Characters ==
Caroline Reid has developed a world of characters who have also become cult status. PAM Ann's Global Alliance:

- Lilly (Singapore Airlines): A Singapore-Chinese flight attendant who would sacrifice passenger safety for her Gucci handbag.
- Valerie (American Airlines): An aging American flight attendant from Texas.
- Vanity (Virgin Atlantic): A sultry woman in red who asks that passengers call her sex line. The number for this ends in 747-400, referencing the aircraft made by Boeing.
- Mona (British Airways): A BA attendant who has appeared with a horse-head instead of a face and "piss off" attitude.
- Donna (EasyJet): A typical, ignorant Chav dressed in orange with Croydon facelift and hoop earrings.
- Vespa (Alitalia): A perky Italian woman who greets passengers with "Ciao! Bellissimo! Donatellaversace!"
- Chantal Jemeladonne (Air France): A snobby fashionista who walks the aircraft aisle as if it were a catwalk.
- Marcia (Air Jamaica): Dressed in flowing gowns and accompanied by soul music.
- Heidi (Scandinavian Airlines System): A Swedish woman who usually appears undressed with coffee pots strategically located.
- Conchita Rosa María González Gómez (Iberia Airlines): A tiny Spanish woman with bright red hair and sings "Fanta, do you want a Fanta? Fan ta? Hola!"
- Helga (Lufthansa): A brash, dominating woman who barks out commands and orders.
- Unnamed Arabic woman (Emirates, Qatar Airways & Etihad Airways) A woman with a chador and ski mask talking gibberish that resembles Arabic.
- Unnamed Indian woman (Air India): A woman in a sari who ignores passenger's requests on call button (made by herself), while declaring "I am fingering the air hostess, but she is not coming."
- Voula (Olympic Airlines): A cigarette-smoking woman dressed up in ancient Greek costume who cuts kebab and says "Pustis pustis pustis malaka tzatziki".
- Gloria (Qantas): A Qantas air hostess who wears the typical Qantas uniform. While giving the safety video, she states some of Qantas's defects. She also offers a full "head to toe" licking for everyone who still chooses to fly Qantas.
- Sarah (Virgin Atlantic): A Virgin Atlantic air hostess who offers passengers salty nuts. When a terrorist tries taking her hostage, she offers him oral pleasure.
- Clodagh (Ryanair): An Irish flight attendant who often syphons fuel from other airlines and repeatedly shouts "I love my job".

== TV and film ==
In Australia, Pam Ann starred, wrote and produced her own television talk show, The Pam Ann Show on the national Foxtel comedy channel. The Pam Ann Show has 8 episodes:

- Episode 1: Beijing. Guest starring Olympic gold medallist Matthew Mitcham and Dr Cindy Pan
- Episode 2: Athens. Guest starring Effie, Simon Burke
- Episode 3: Rome. Guest starring Mark Antonio, Brent Zaicek, Julijana Grbac, Steve Bastoni, Tina Arena, Charlotte Dawson, Jayson Brunsdon, Alyce Crawford, Rebecca Jobson
- Episode 4: London. Guest starring David Campbell, Gerry Connolly, Julia Morris
- Episode 5: New York. Guest starring Peter Morrissey, Matt Shirvington, Bob Downe
- Episode 6: Dubai. Guest starring Jono Coleman, Akmal Saleh, Danni Minogue
- Episode 7: Sydney. Guest starring Paul O'Brien, Todd Mckenny, Darren Hayes
- Episode 8: Delhi. Guest starring Tania Zaetta, Leo Sayer, Courtney Act

Caroline made an appearance in the British comedy film Confetti, as a judge called Minky.

In 1997, Caroline appeared in the Full Frontal (TV Series Australia) as additional cast

- Episode #5.20
- Episode #5.19
- Episode #5.16
- Episode #5.15
- Episode #5.14

In 2017, Caroline Reid performed a one woman stand up show called RAWR at Leicester Square Theatre.
