= Death of Classical =

Classical music concert series in New York City

Death of Classical is a classical music concert series founded by Andrew Ousley, best known for its unconventional approach to concert presentation, often holding them in distinctive and non-traditional venues. These locations have included Gothic crypt beneath the Church of the Intercession in Manhattan and the catacombs of Green-Wood Cemetery in Brooklyn.

== History ==
Death of Classical was founded by Andrew Ousley, a music enthusiast and the son of an opera singer, with the primary goal of rejuvenating the classical music landscape. Ousley's vision for the series emerged from a desire to challenge the conventional perception of classical music as elitist or dull, with the self-stated intention to rekindle interest and broaden the appeal of the art form by introducing it to new audiences.

One of the defining features of the series is its distinctive choice of venues, which depart from the traditional concert hall setting. These venues have included the Gothic crypt beneath the Church of the Intercession and the catacombs at Green-Wood Cemetery in Brooklyn. The deliberate selection of these unique locations was aimed at crafting an unexpected and immersive experience for the audience, in comparison to the confines of conventional concert settings.

== Venues ==
Death of Classical is known for its distinctive choice of venues, which provide a unique backdrop for classical music performances. Artists who have performed on the series include tenor Lawrence Brownlee, violinist Lara St. John, cellist Joshua Roman, and opera countertenor John Holiday.

=== Gothic crypts beneath the Church of the Intercession ===
Death of Classic's series The Crypt Sessions hosts concerts in the Gothic crypt chapel, originally designed for interment of parishioners located beneath the Church of the Intercession in Manhattan's Washington Heights neighborhood.

=== Catacombs at Green-Wood Cemetery ===
Another unconventional venue for Death of Classical concerts are the catacombs of Green-Wood Cemetery in Brooklyn, subterranean spaces used for burial in the 18th and 19th centuries.

== Critical reception ==
Death of Classical has garnered substantial media recognition. The New York Times has praised the series, noting its unique concert experience and curation. Artists and ensembles that have performed on the series include the New York Philharmonic, Lawrence Brownlee, Caroline Shaw, Jennifer Koh, Anthony Roth Costanzo, Simone Dinnerstein, Gil Shaham, Alexandre Tharaud, Lara St. John, Conrad Tao, and more.

Death of Classical has formed partnerships with institutions ranging from Carnegie Hall to the United Nations. The series has received numerous accolades, including a place on the New York Times' "Best Classical Music Concerts of the Year" list, a Classical: Next Innovation Award, The American Prize for the Arts, and WQXR's 'Excellence in Opera' award for the world premiere of David Hertzberg's opera The Rose Elf in the Catacombs in 2018.
