= Teller (magician) =

American magician (born 1948)

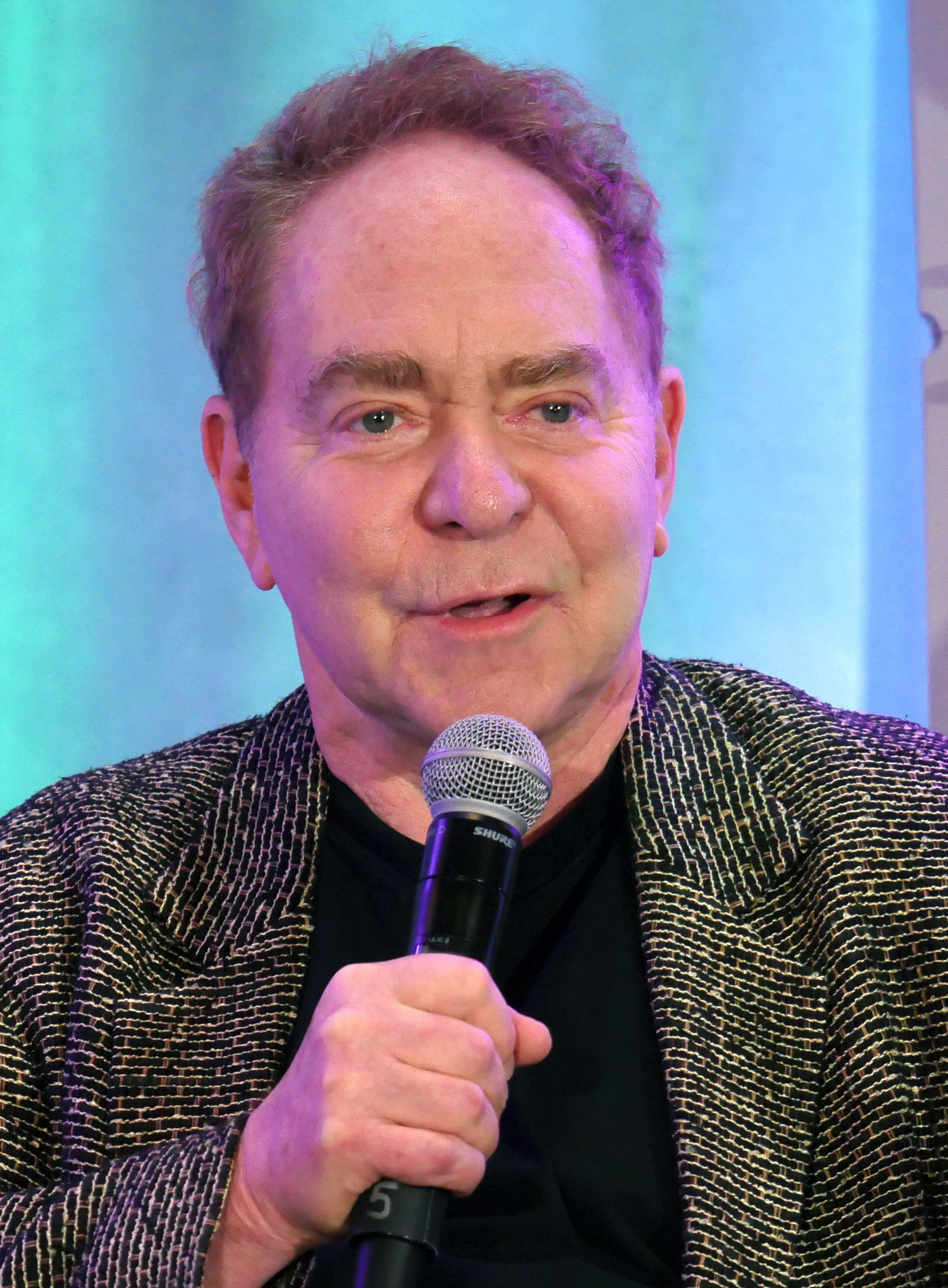
- Teller in 2023
- Born: Raymond Joseph Derickson Teller; February 14, 1948 (age 78); Philadelphia, Pennsylvania, U.S.
- Education: Amherst College (BA)
- Occupation: Magician
- Years active: 1974–present
- Website: pennandteller.com

Notes
- Voice of Teller

Teller (born Raymond Joseph Derickson Teller, February 14, 1948) is an American magician, actor, and author. He is half of the comedy magic duo Penn & Teller, along with Penn Jillette, and usually does not speak during performances. Teller is an H.L. Mencken Fellow at the Cato Institute.

== Early and personal life ==
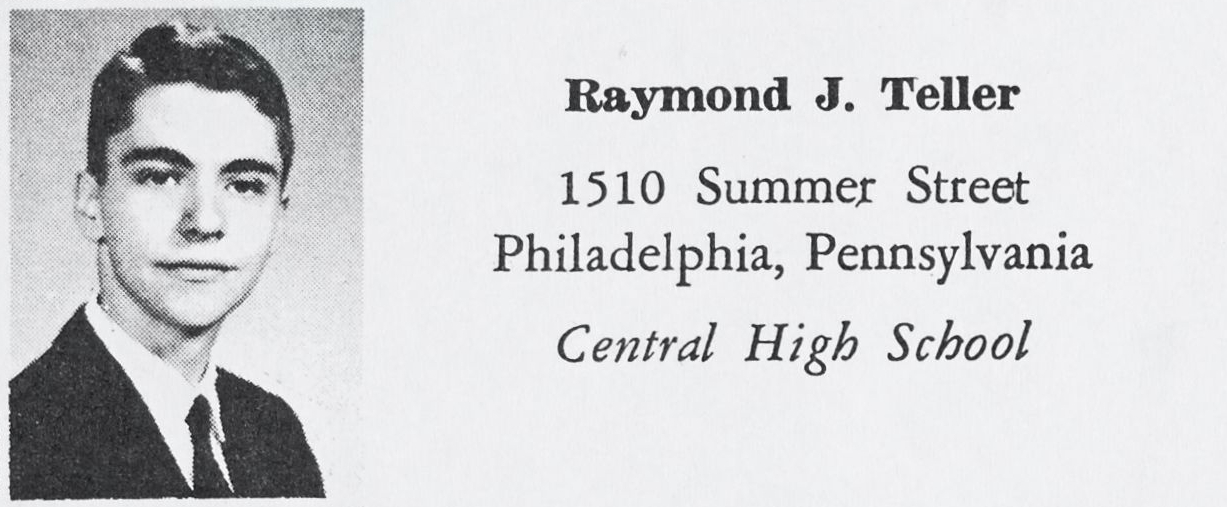
Teller in the Amherst College yearbook, 1969

Teller was born in Philadelphia, Pennsylvania, the son of Irene B. (née Derrickson; 1908–2004) and Israel Max "Joseph" Teller (1913–2004). His father, who was of Russian-Jewish descent, was born in Brooklyn, New York, and grew up in Philadelphia. His mother was from a Delaware farming family. They met as painters attending art school at Samuel S. Fleisher Art Memorial. His mother was Methodist, and Teller was raised as "a sort of half-assed Methodist".

In 1965, Teller graduated from Philadelphia's Central High School.

In 1969, Teller graduated from Amherst College with a Bachelor of Arts in Classics. He became a high-school Latin teacher.

At some point, Teller legally changed his name to the mononym Teller, his family surname. He had reportedly been using the mononym professionally at least since some time before the 1975 formation of the Asparagus Valley Cultural Society. By December 2000, he reported that his own parents were calling him Teller.

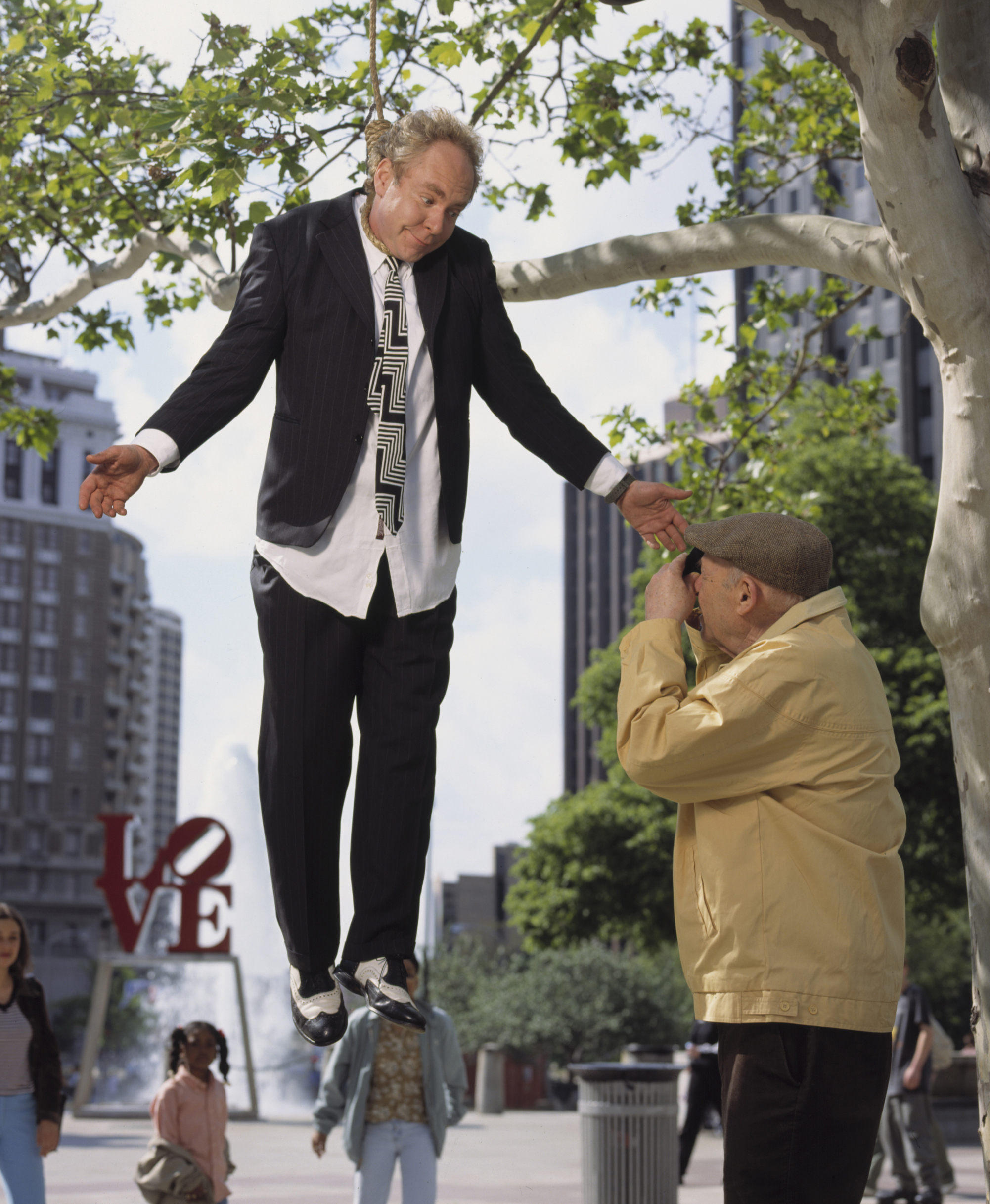
Teller (age 59) poses for a photo hanging from a tree in Love Park (2007).

Teller taught Greek and Latin at Lawrence High School in Lawrenceville, New Jersey.

In 2001, Teller was inducted into the Central High School Hall of Fame.

=== Health ===
In 2018 and 2019, Teller had three back surgeries over 18 months. In late September 2022, he underwent quadruple-bypass heart surgery.

== Career ==
=== Performing ===
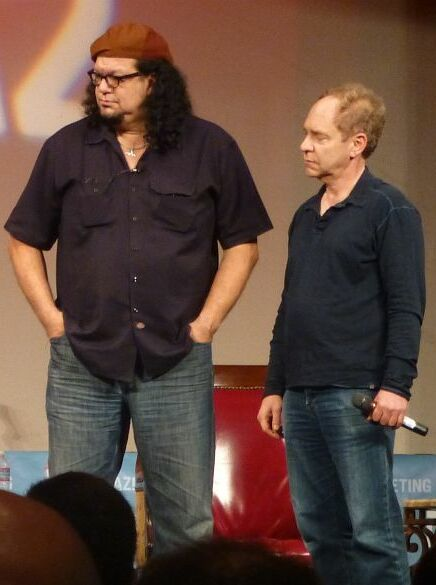
Penn & Teller in 2012

Teller began performing with his friend Weir Chrisemer as The Othmar Schoeck Memorial Society for the Preservation of Unusual and Disgusting Music. He met Penn Jillette in 1974, and, with Chrisemer, they became a three-person act called Asparagus Valley Cultural Society, which started at the Minnesota Renaissance Festival and subsequently played in San Francisco. By January 1975, Penn & Teller were performing with Robert Davidson's Aqueous Fowle jazz/rock band in New Brunswick, New Jersey, and at his Summer Intime Cabaret in 1976. In 1981, Jillette and Teller began performing exclusively together as Penn & Teller, an act that continues to this day. On April 5, 2013, Penn and Teller were honored with a star on the Hollywood Walk of Fame in the live performance category. The following day, they were recognized by the Magic Castle with the Magicians of the Year award.

Teller rarely speaks while performing but regularly speaks in other contexts, such as interviews. Teller's trademark silence originated during his youth, when he earned a living performing magic at college fraternity parties. He found that if he maintained silence throughout his act, spectators refrained from throwing beer and heckling him and paid more attention to his performance.

=== Writing ===
Teller collaborated with Jillette on three magic books, and is also the author of "When I'm Dead All This Will Be Yours!": Joe Teller – A Portrait by His Kid (2000), a biography/memoir of his father. The book features his father's paintings and 100 unpublished cartoons which were strongly influenced by George Lichty's Grin and Bear It. The book was favorably reviewed by Publishers Weekly. Teller's father's "wryly observed scenes of Philadelphia street life" were created in 1939. Teller and his father's "memories began to pump and the stories flowed" after they opened boxes of old letters that Teller read out loud (learning for the first time about a period in his parents' lives that he knew nothing about, such as the fact that his father's name is really Israel Max Teller). Joe's Depression-era hobo adventures led to travels throughout the U.S., Canada and Alaska, and by 1933, he returned to Philadelphia for art study. After Joe and Irene met during evening art classes, they married, and Joe worked half-days as a Philadelphia Inquirer copy boy. When the Inquirer rejected his cartoons, he moved into advertising art just as World War II began.

Teller is a co-author of the paper "Attention and Awareness in Stage Magic: Turning Tricks into Research", published in Nature Reviews Neuroscience (November 2008).

In 2010, Teller wrote Play Dead, a "throwback to the spook shows of the 1930s and '40s" that ran September 12–24 in Las Vegas before opening off Broadway in New York. The show starred sideshow performer and magician Todd Robbins.

=== Directing ===
In 2008, Teller and Aaron Posner co-directed a version of Macbeth which incorporated stage magic techniques, for example in the scenes with the Three Witches. In 2014, Teller and Posner co-directed a version of The Tempest, which again made use of stage magic; in an interview Teller stated that "Shakespeare wrote one play that's about a magician, and it seemed like about time to realize that with all the capabilities of modern magic in the theater." In 2018, Teller and Posner co-conceived and directed a brand new production of Macbeth at Chicago Shakespeare Theater in Chicago, Illinois. In 2022, the Round House Theater staged Teller and Posner's adaptation of The Tempest and made a video recording of it temporarily available for purchase, to stream.

Teller directed a feature film documentary, Tim's Vermeer, which was released in 2014. He and Jillette served as executive producers, with distribution by Sony Pictures Classics.

== Books ==
- Jillette, Penn; Teller (1989). Penn and Teller's Cruel Tricks for Dear Friends. New York: Villard. ISBN 0-394-75351-8.
- Jillette, Penn; Teller (1992). Penn and Teller's How to Play with Your Food. New York: Villard. ISBN 0-679-74311-1.
- Jillette, Penn; Teller (1997). Penn and Teller's How to Play in Traffic. New York: Berkley Trade. ISBN 1-57297-293-9.
- Teller; Teller, Joe (2000). "When I'm Dead All This Will Be Yours!": Joe Teller – A Portrait by His Kid. New York: Blast Books. ISBN 0-922233-22-5.
- Teller; Karr, Todd; Abbott, David P. (2005). House of Mystery: The Magic Science of David P. Abbott. Marina del Rey, California: Miracle Factory. Archived from the original on October 29, 2013.

== Film and television ==
Year	Title	Role	Notes
1986	My Chauffeur	Abdul	
1987	Miami Vice	Ralph Fisher	Season 4 Episode 8: "Like a Hurricane"
1987	Long Gone	Hale Buchman Jr.	
1989	Penn & Teller Get Killed	Self	Also writer
1995; 1997	The Drew Carey Show	Geller	Season 1 Episode 6: "Drew Meets Lawyers"; Season 2 episode 17: "See Drew Run"
1997	Sabrina the Teenage Witch	Skippy	Season 1 episode 1: "Pilot"; Season 1 Episode 13: "Jenny's Non-Dream"
1998	Dharma & Greg	Mr. Boots	Season 1 Episode 20: "The Cat's Out of the Bag"
1998	Babylon 5	Zooty	Season 5 Episode 8: "Day of the Dead"
1999	Home Improvement	Self	Season 8 Episode 15: "Knee Deep"
1999; 2011	The Simpsons	Self	Season 11 Episode 6: "Hello Gutter, Hello Fadder"; Season 22 Episode 18: "The Great Simpsina"
2000	Fantasia 2000	Self	
2000	The Fantasticks	Mortimer	
2003–10	Penn & Teller: Bullshit!	Self	Also writer
2004	The West Wing	Self	Season 6 Episode 8: "In the Room"
2010–24	Hell's Kitchen	Self	4 Episodes
2010	Fetch! with Ruff Ruffman	Self	Episode "You Can't Teach an Orange Dog New Tricks
2011	Penn & Teller Tell a Lie	Self	Also writer
2011; 2015–present	Penn & Teller: Fool Us	Self	Also creator
2012	Atlas Shrugged: Part II	Laughlin	
2013	Tim's Vermeer	Self	Also director and writer
2016	Director's Cut	Rudy Nelson	
2018	The Big Bang Theory	Larry Fowler	3 Episodes
2020	How It Really Happened	Self	Episode: "Siegfried & Roy Part 1: The Tiger Attack"
2021	History's Greatest Mysteries	Self	Episode: "Houdini's Lost Diaries"
2022	Young Sheldon	Pus	Episode: "A Clogged Pore, a Little Spanish and the Future"
2023	Mrs. Davis		Magic consultant
2026	Stuart Fails to Save the Universe	Alternate version of self	Episode: "Spoiler: Gary Dies"

== See also ==
- List of atheists in film, radio, television and theater
