= Todd Robbins =

American magician, lecturer, actor, and author

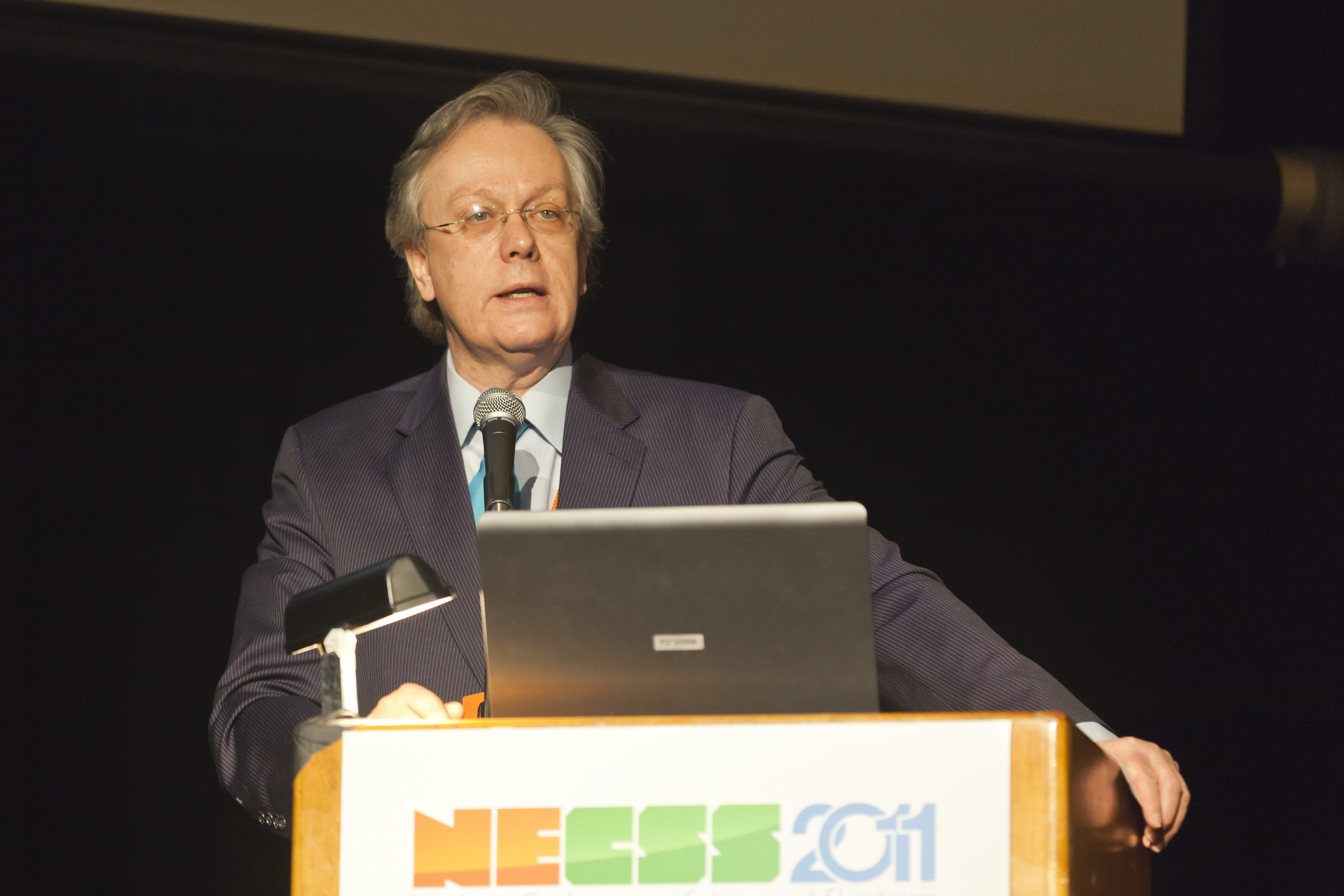
- Born: August 15, 1958 (age 66); Long Beach, California, United States
- Occupations: Magician; carnival performer; lecturer; actor; author
- Spouse: Krista Brown Robbins
- Website: ToddRobbins.com

Todd Robbins (born August 15, 1958) is an American magician, lecturer, actor, and author.

== Biography ==
Todd Robbins was born in Long Beach, California, the son of a soap executive and a schoolteacher. At the age of 10, Robbins was introduced to magic, enrolling in magic lessons at the B&H School of Magic every Saturday afternoon. His regular interaction with these seasoned magicians and "carnies" led to an interest learning the secrets of Sideshow Arts. He became the first Junior Member of the Famous Magic Castle school of magic. Soon after, Todd joined the Long Beach Mystics, a troupe run by the students and hosting professional magicians and variety acts, including an up-and-coming young juggler/magician named Steve Martin.

With a new interest in performance, Robbins attended the American Conservatory Theater in San Francisco where he earned his degree in Theatre Arts. It is here that Todd met scene partner and friend Annette Bening, and in 1980 he moved to New York City to pursue a career in theatre.

He went on a myriad of auditions and landed some small, low-paying roles. "I found it all very dubious. I did a few readings, a couple of small shows in basement spaces, which was all kind of fun but it wasn’t paying the rent." It was around this time that the new vaudeville movement made a comeback with the likes of Penn and Teller and Bill Irwin gaining in popularity. This gave Robbins the incentive he needed to make a change, thus resurrecting his interest in magic and carnivals. He began working at Coney Island in an amusement park sideshow swallowing swords, eating fire, hammering nails in his nose, doing all those great, classic old-timer acts.

Robbins inherited the sideshow tradition almost literally, from Melvin Burkhart, one of the pioneers in the field. Born in 1907, Burkhart worked venues from Ringling Brothers to Ripley's Believe It or Not, making a name for himself as the father of the Human Blockhead act—hammering a nail into one's nostril. Burkhart's last performance took place on October 8, 2001 at Robbins's wedding to Krista Brown. About a month after the performance, Burkhart died, leaving his props to Robbins; his costume and signature enormous nail arrived in the mail. His cremated remains were also left to Robbins, who subsequently sprinkled the ashes at Coney Island.

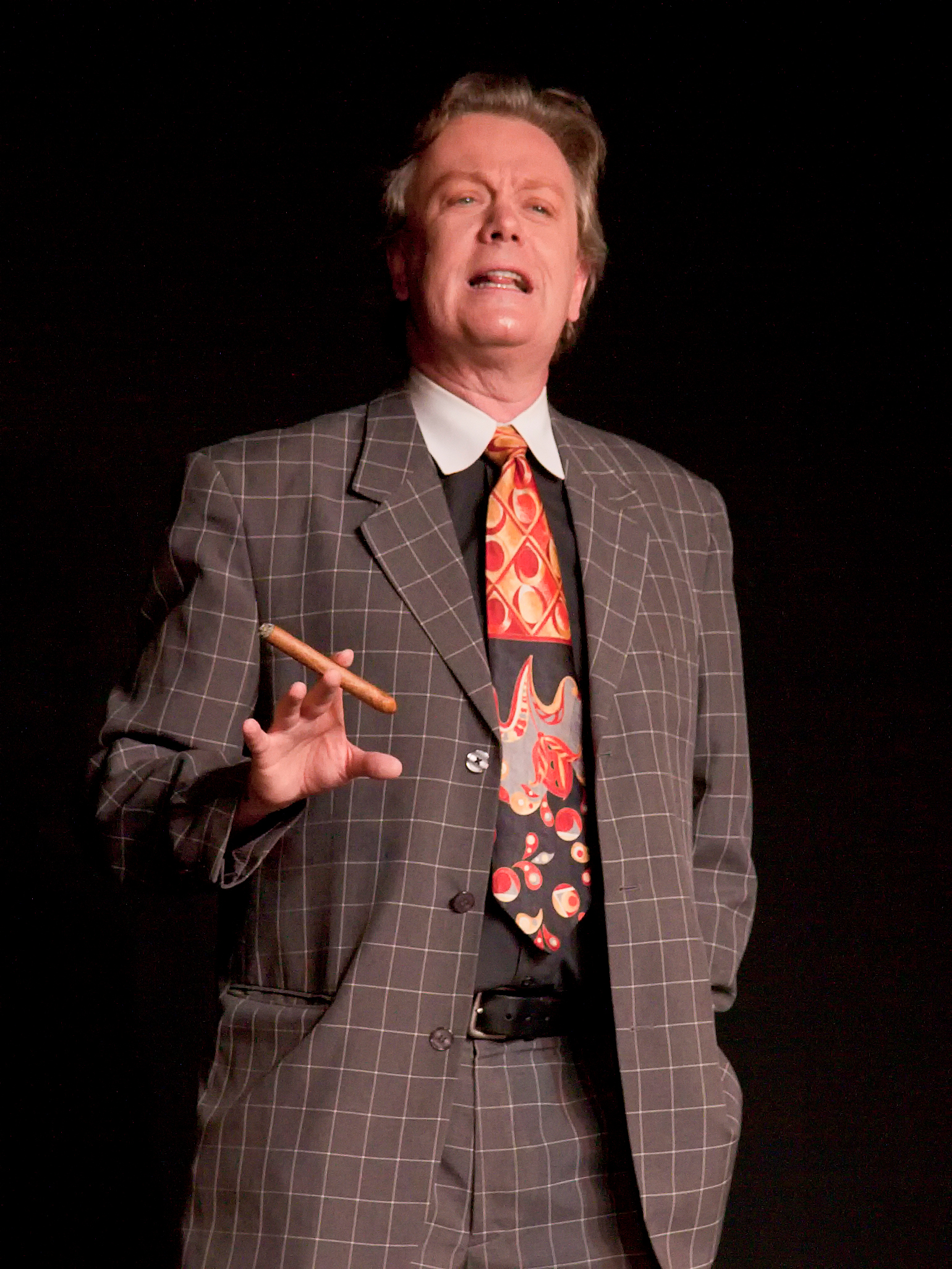
from "Monday Night Magic"

== Career ==
Robbins is known for a variety of sideshow acts such as sword swallowing, Human Blockhead, and glass eating, including wine glasses and light bulbs. Robbins estimates he has eaten more than 5,000 light bulbs throughout his career, sometimes consuming up to 21 per week.

Robbins has been featured on more than 100 television shows, which include multiple appearances on David Letterman, Jay Leno and Conan O'Brien; Masters of Illusion; and the NBC special Extreme Variety. He was a featured guest on Criss Angel Mindfreak and is also the main subject of the 2005 documentary American Carny: True Tales From The Circus Sideshow, directed by Nick Basile.

Robbins is one of five partners in the longest running off-Broadway show, Monday Night Magic.

He starred in an off-Broadway show Carnival Knowledge which ran from 2002 to 2004 and featured Robbins eating light bulbs and swallowing swords. It was also nominated for a Drama Desk Award. He also served as dean of the sideshow school in Coney Island, where for $600 he would teach about the history of sideshow acts as well as instruct the students how to swallow swords or lie on a bed of nails.

In 2008, he toured as part of a stage show called Hoodwinked with Bob Arno, Banachek and Richard Turner.

In 2009, Robbins was featured in a Ripley's Believe It or Not! cartoon panel noting that he had "chewed and swallowed over 4,000 light bulbs."

In 2010, Robbins starred in Play Dead, written by Robbins and Teller of Penn & Teller, a "throwback to the spook shows of the 1930s and ’40s" that ran September 12–24 in Las Vegas before opening Off Broadway in New York at The Players Theatre.

Todd Robbins has worked for Ripley's Believe It or Not! and was also a ringmaster at the Big Apple Circus.

He has been associated with the Big Apple Circus for more than a dozen years (performing in various roles including the ringmaster) and can often be seen playing piano with Woody Allen's jazz band at the Cafe Carlyle. Todd currently performs regularly at New York’s longest running Off-Broadway magic show, Monday Night Magic.

In 2015, Robbins began hosting a TV series on ID network titled 'True Nightmares' in which he presents 3 strange but true characters known to history as nightmares that came all too true.

In 2019, Robbins began hosting and producing a weekly showcase of stage and close-up magic in New York City called, "Speakeasy Magick", at the McKittrick Hotel.

== "Play Dead" the film ==
Inspired by his off-Broadway show and co-written by Teller of Penn & Teller, the film combines a tongue-in-cheek, skeptical humor, which will be familiar to Penn & Teller fans, with elements from carnival sideshows, magic shows, séances and haunted houses. This Grand Guignol revivalism hearkens back to the early days of the 1940s spook shows when gruesome surprises awaited an unsuspecting audience. A theme of blind faith runs throughout, and gives Robbins and Teller the opportunity to use and then reveal the illusions put forth by mediums, calling them out for the criminals they truly are. In his "Meet the Skeptics" interview from TAM 2013, Robbins admits to having a "fascination for people... who are frauds [con artists and spiritualists]", who claim to have supernatural powers which are, in reality, proven sideshow techniques Robbins performs himself. In his words, this is "reality at its most amazing."

Robbins and Teller are now in development of this show into TV series. "The series chronicles a traveling theatrical troupe that, under the guise of performing a quirky magic show of spooky amusement, presents experimentations of alchemistic procedures for the resurrection of the dead", writes Robbins.

== Books ==
- Robbins, Todd (2008). The Modern Con Man: How to Get Something for Nothing. New York: Bloomsbury USA. pp. 240 pages. ISBN 978-1-59691-453-7. OCLC 182621498.
