= Church of the Intercession (Manhattan) =

Church in Manhattan, New York

Coordinates: 40°49′56″N 73°56′42″W

- Chapel of the Intercession Complex
- U.S. National Register of Historic Places
- New York State Register of Historic Places
- New York City Landmark
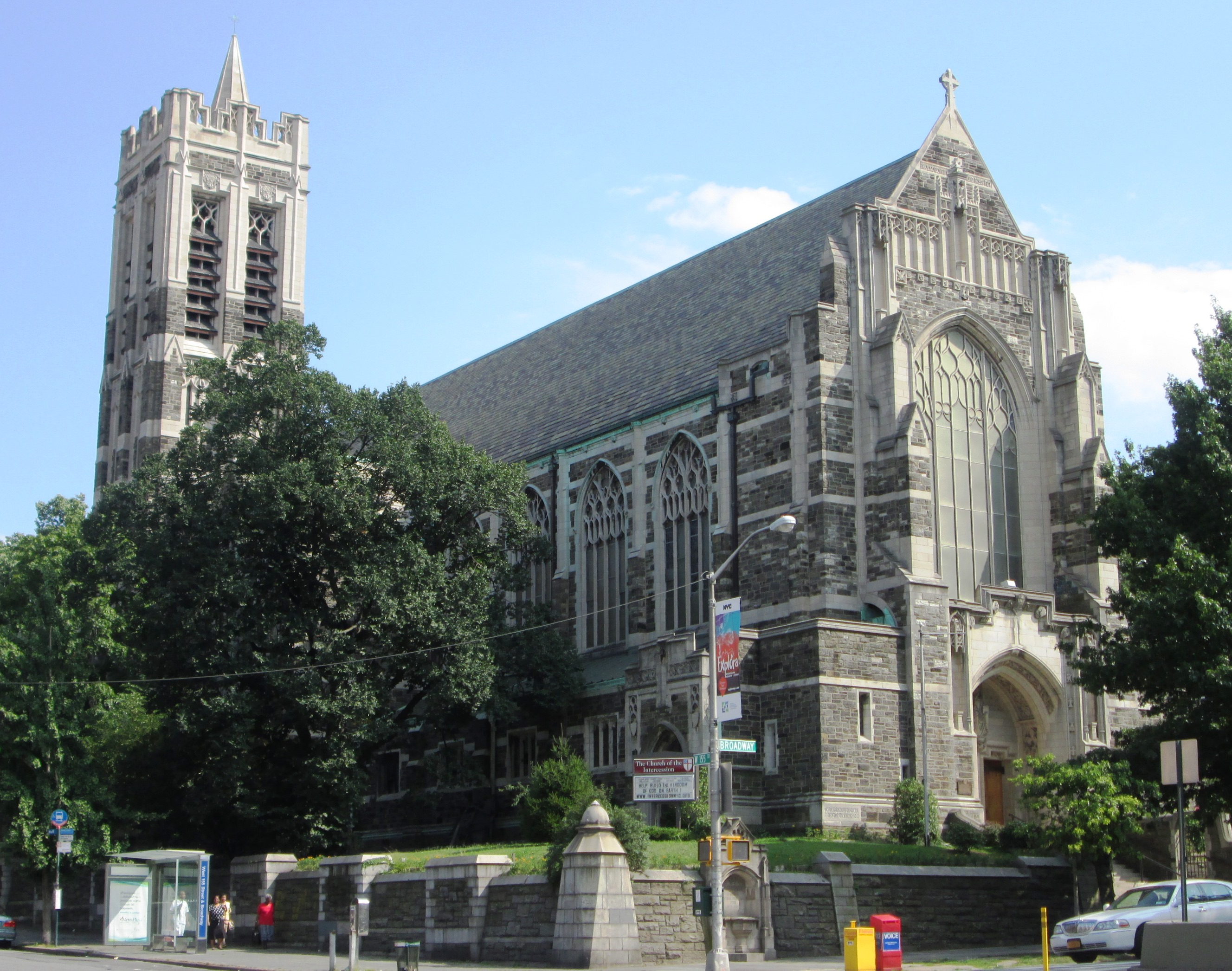
- Looking southeast in 2013

- Location within New York City Location within New York Location within the United States
- Location: 550 West 155th Street; Manhattan, New York City
- Built: 1912–1915
- Architect: Bertram Grosvenor Goodhue
- Architectural style: church: Late English Gothic Revival, and others vicarage: Tudor Revival
- NRHP reference No.: 80002677
- NYSRHP No.: 06101.000098
- NYCL No.: 0306

Significant dates
- Added to NRHP: July 24, 1980
- Designated NYSRHP: June 23, 1980
- Designated NYCL: August 16, 1966

The Church of the Intercession is an Episcopal congregation located at 550 West 155th Street, at Broadway, on the border of the Harlem and Washington Heights neighborhoods of Manhattan, New York City, on the grounds of Trinity Church Cemetery. The congregation was founded in 1846, and the current sanctuary, built in 1912–1915, was designed by Bertram Grosvenor Goodhue in the Gothic Revival style. From 1906–1976, it was a chapel of Trinity Church.

The church reported 230 members in 2017 and 164 members in 2023; no membership statistics were reported in 2024 parochial reports. Plate and pledge income reported for the congregation in 2024 was $0.00 with average Sunday attendance (ASA) of zero persons.

The Church of the Intercession and its Tudor Revival vicarage were designated New York City Landmarks in 1966, and the complex was added to the National Register of Historic Places in 1980.

== History ==
The congregation which became the Church of the Intercession was founded in 1846 in Carmansville, a hamlet which would later be known as Audubon Park before becoming part of the Washington Heights neighborhood, by John James Audubon and John R. Morewood; it was incorporated in 1847. Services were initially held in Morewood's home, with members who came from both Trinity Church on Broadway and Wall Street, and from the Church of the Ascension at Fifth Avenue and 10th Street.

In 1847, the congregation completed building their first sanctuary, a Victorian Gothic style wooden structure at West 154th Street and Tenth Avenue (now Amsterdam Avenue). The building's outline can still be seen on what was the adjoining building. In 1871, the vestry decided to move the parish and sell the building.

The congregation's next church was a stone building designed by Rembrandt Lockwood and located at 158th Street and Grand Boulevard, which is now Broadway. However, dissension within the congregation suppressed financial support for the parish, which became insolvent; the church was attached by the sheriff, and services proceeded only on the sufferance of the authorities.

Eventually, the congregation was able to recover the church, but by 1906 it was overcrowded, and the parish was still in debt. To alleviate these problems, a deal was struck with Trinity Church, which had intended to build a chapel on the grounds of its cemetery, to disestablish the Church of the Intercession as an independent parish, to become a Trinity Chapel, the Chapel of the Intercession. The cornerstone of a new sanctuary was laid in 1912, and the building was consecrated in 1915. The architect, Bertram Grosvenor Goodhue of Cram, Goodhue & Ferguson, was a master of the Gothic Revival style, and the resulting church is considered to be his masterpiece. Goodhue incorporated elements from other styles into the building, such as the narrow and tall entrances which evoke the English Perpendicular style, while the Decorated Period can be seen in the tracery of the pointed windows, and the tower suggests the Tudor style. The church was built by Edward A. Wehr of Pittsburgh, who considered this his finest piece of work.

The congregation again became an independent parish in 1976.

== Notable facts ==
- David Hurd composed the Intercession Mass during his tenure as church organist. This mass setting is used in many Episcopal congregations.
- The church is known for its annual Clement Clarke Moore Festival, the oldest continuing Christmas tradition in New York. It takes place on the Sunday before Christmas at 4pm. In 2010 celebrated the one-hundredth anniversary of the tradition. At the center of the service is the reading of Moore's narrative poem "A Visit from Saint Nicholas".
- Moore, among others of the New York social elite of the time, are buried in the adjoining Trinity Church Cemetery. Also in the cemetery is an imposing monument to John James Audubon. John Jacob Astor is also buried here, as is Alfred Tennyson Dickens, the son of Charles Dickens. A monument to the architect, Bertram Grosvenor Goodhue, sculpted by his friend Lee Lawrie in 1929, contains his tomb.

== In popular culture ==
- The basement of the church was used in the 2012 TV series 666 Park Avenue as The Drake's "secret room."

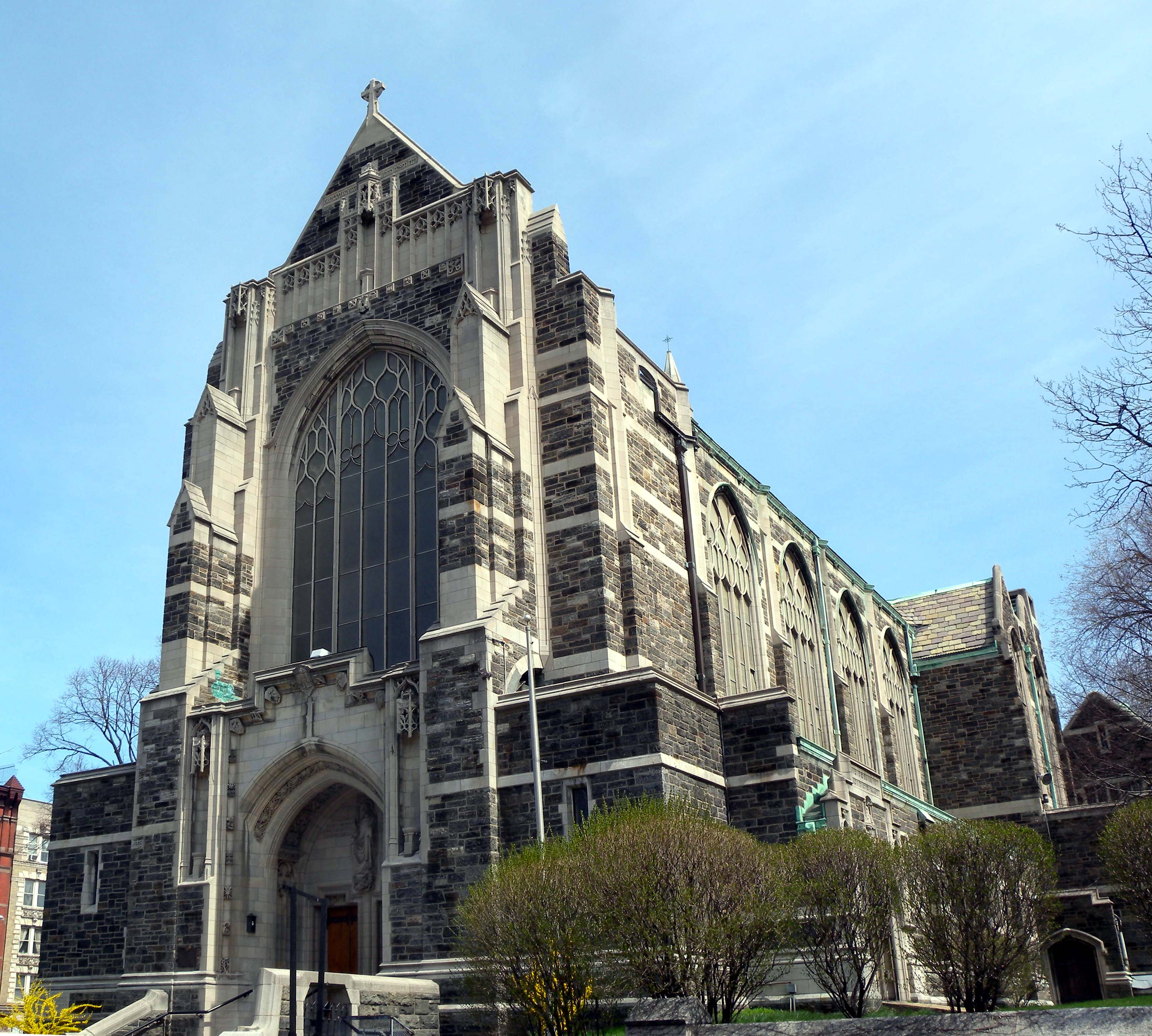
Broadway facade of the church in 2009

- In the season 1, episode 4 New Amsterdam episode of AMC drama Mad Men, Trudy Campbell divulges to a member of the co-op board that Pete's great-great grandfather Nicholas Dyckman is buried at Church of the Intercession.
- In the 2021 Steven Spielberg film West Side Story, Maria (Rachel Zegler) and Tony (Ansel Elgort) sing "One Hand, One Heart" in a scene filmed at Church of the Intercession, although the implied location is The Cloisters.
- The church was used as the convent for the Elsbeth Season 3 episode "And Then There Were Nuns".

== See also ==
- List of New York City Landmarks
- National Register of Historic Places listings in New York County, New York
