= IEK =

Educational institute in Greece

Institute of Vocational Training
- Ινστιτούτο Επαγγελματικής Κατάρτισης
- Abbreviation: IEK
- Successor: School of Advanced Vocational Training – SAEK (Greek: Σχολή Ανώτερης Επαγγελματικής Κατάρτισης – ΣΑΕΚ)
- Formation: 1992
- Type: Adult only; Formal education; Post-secondary education; Vocational education and training (VET)
- Legal status: Public or private
- Location: Greece
- Official language: Greek
- Parent organization: Ministry of Education, General Secretariat for Vocational Education, Training, and Life-long Learning (GGEEK&DBM)
- Affiliations: Centers for Vocational Education and Training (KEEK)
- Website: gsvetlly.minedu.gov.gr

IEK (Greek: ΙΕΚ) is a Greek abbreviation name for the Ινστιτούτο Επαγγελματικής Κατάρτισης (Institute of Vocational Training).

IEK was established in 1992 as a type of educational institution specifically to provide adult vocational education and training (VET) at the post-secondary education level (Greek: Μεταδευτεροβάθμια Εκπαίδευση) considered to be a body of "non-formal education" (φορέας μη τυπικής εκπαίδευσης). With the law 4763/2020 Government Gazette 254/A/21-12-2020 the IEK belongs to "formal education" (φορέας τυπικής εκπαίδευσης) and IEK graduates having Diploma of Vocational Education and Training at HQF level 5, after successful specific entrance examinations (κατατακτήριες εξετάσεις), allows to them admission into the higher education to an undergraduate programme relevant to their IEK programme specialty. The IEK does not require entrance examinations for admission to its programmes. IEK name variants include Post–Secondary Institute of Vocational Education and Training (PSIVET), Institute of Vocational Education and Training (IVET), and Institute of Professional Studies (IPS).

With the law 5082/2024 Government Gazette 9/A/19-1-2024, ΔΙΕΚ (Δημόσιο Ινστιτούτο Επαγγελματικής Κατάρτισης) (DIEK, Public Institute of Vocational Training) was renamed ΔΣΑΕΚ (Δημόσια Σχολή Ανώτερης Επαγγελματικής Κατάρτισης) (DSAEK, Public School of Advanced Vocational Training). ΙΙΕΚ (Ιδιωτικό Ινστιτούτο Επαγγελματικής Κατάρτισης) (IIEK, Private Institute of Vocational Training) was renamed ΙΣΑΕΚ (Ιδιωτική Σχολή Ανώτερης Επαγγελματικής Κατάρτισης) (ISAEK, Private School of Advanced Vocational Training). ΠΕΙΔΙΕΚ (Πειραματικό Δημόσιο ΙΕΚ) (PEIDIEK, Public Experimental IEK) was renamed ΠΕΙΔΣΑΕΚ (Πειραματική Δημόσια ΣΑΕΚ) (PEIDSAEK, Public Experimental SAEK). ΘΔΙΕΚ (Θεματικό Δημόσιο ΙΕΚ) (Public Thematic IEK) was renamed ΘΔΣΑΕΚ (Θεματική Δημόσια ΣΑΕΚ) (Public Thematic SAEK).

== Public and private IEK ==
Public IEK (Greek: ΔΙΕΚ) and private IEK (Greek: IΙΕΚ) offer postsecondary courses accredited by Ministry of Education and the National Organization for the Certification of Qualifications and Vocational Guidance (EOPPEP, Greek: Εθνικός Οργανισμός Πιστοποίησης Προσόντων και Επαγγελματικού Προσανατολισμού – Ε.Ο.Π.Π.Ε.Π.).

Public IEK (DIEK) is also known as State IEK (DIEK), State Institute of Vocational Training (DIEK), that was renamed State SAEK (DSAEK), State School of Advanced Vocational Training (DSAEK).

There are approx. 132 regional Public IEK (Greek: ΔΙΕΚ) in the administrative regions of Greece, and also over 50 Private IEK (Greek: IIEK) administrated by EOPPEP entity, recognized by the Ministry of Education. Additionally, they also exist public IEKs of Ministry of Tourism at which has hospitality and tourism specialties; of National Center for Emergency Care (EKAV); of Ministry of Health; of Public Employment Service (DYPA); of Hellenic Agricultural Organization – DEMETER of the Ministry of Rural Development and Food. There is also the IIEK Energy Institute of the Public Power Corporation (DEI) in Kozani. Generally, public IEKs operate afternoon starting by 15:00 pm consisted of borrowing day secondary education school's buildings for their lecture classes, and for their laboratory classes consisted of borrowing laboratories owned and sponsored by individual companies, however, laboratories are offered to the IEK by priority order subject to change depending on availability. Either private or public IEK is on a two terms (semesters) system per academic calendar year has the national education system (curriculum) set forth by the Ministry of Education of Greece. IEK students are being assessed during the semester in the form of progress test (πρόοδος), and the final examination test (εξεταστική) taken and the end of the semester. In prior years the Institute of Vocational Training (IEK) was also offered the IEK post lower secondary programmes that have been abolished, where access in them had the students that have completed the gymnasium school.

With the Joint Ministerial Decree 3691/7-4-2014 (Government Gazette 945/B/15-4-2014) they founded the Special Education Public IEKs (Δ.Ι.Ε.Κ. Ειδικής Αγωγής), specifically the Special Education Public IEK Pylaias-Chortiati and Special Education Public IEK Agias Paraskevis, also with the Joint Ministerial Decree Κ1/5082/14-1-2015 (Government Gazette 89/Β/19-1-2015) they founded the Special Education Public IEK Volou and Special Education Public IEK Serron. With the law 4763/2020 they founded the Public Experimental IEKs (PEIDIEK) (ΠΕΙΔΙΕΚ, Πειραματικά Δ.Ι.Ε.Κ.) and Public Thematic IEKs (Θεματικά Δ.Ι.Ε.Κ.).

The Attestation of Student Attendance (Greek: Βεβαίωση Φοίτησης) is an official document issued by anyone IEK school, attesting that a student is currently attending or was attending the IEK school. The Individual Trainee Card (Greek: Ατομικό Δελτίο Καταρτιζόμενου) is a Cumulative Academic Record, or Attestation of Attendance, official document issued by anyone IEK school, attesting that both the student’s transcript of records and its attendance record (academic hours and absences) of a vocational education and training (VET) programme.

== Admission ==
Admission into an IEK’s programme requires adult-only applicants who have graduated from upper secondary education school in Greece at National Qualification Framework (NQF) of Greece Level 4 (EQF 4; lyceum) or its international equivalent officially recognized by the Greek Ministry of Education.

Admission into a public IEK’s programme is selective, subject to fulfilling the entry criteria. It has to be granted on the basis of the upper secondary leaving certificate grade and other criteria include age, the social insurance stamps of applicants having prior employment relevant to the subject of the study applied for, and specific criteria on an individual basis will be assessed. All public IEKs are government-funded have free education, without any payment of tuition fee. Prescribed textbooks and some required materials are not provided by the public IEKs, and thus students (enrollees) will have to be purchased at their own cost, subject to the chosen specialty. The VAT number (ΑΦΜ, registration code for tax purposes) and SSRN (AMKA, Social Security Registration Number) are required from the student for its admission. Since its foundation in 1992, public IEKs were required by law from their students to pay up to €367 statutory tuition each semester until the 2012-2013 academic year, but has been apolished since the 2013-2014 academic year by Law 4186/2013, Chapter IV, Article 23(2), Government Gazette 193/Α/17-9-2013. Admission into a private IEK’s programme is non-selective, meaning does not select its intake on the basis of academic achievement having an open enrollment for those who have graduated from senior secondary school without further admission requirements, since all most private IEKs they are for-profit IEKs financed primarily through tuition fees received from students.

== Practical training ==
As part of IEK curriculum, hence also being known as curricular practicum or 5th semester, IEK student must be complete a work placement. The work placement is a paid contract CDD at an employment compulsory by law that is subsidized by the state. It can be an Internship (πρακτική) term: 960 hours workplace’s work practice training considered upon 4th semester graduation or during 3rd or 4th semester; or it can be an Apprenticeship (μαθητεία) term: 192 hours Apprenticeship at IEK school (classes) 1 day per week with 8 hours per day and 768 hours Apprenticeship at a Work Placement 4 days per week with 8 hours per day considered upon fourth (4th) semester graduation, unless otherwise is stated from the apprenticeship programme of study also known as Dual VET two-track education system (δυικό σύστημα επαγγελματικής εκπαίδευσης και κατάρτισης). Practical training, either internship or apprenticeship, can only be taken until the twenty four (24) months time limit since the IEK specialty fourth semester graduation.

However, the IEK programmes can also be offered with a shorter duration including 1200 hours at IEK school (classes) only for those students who having already obtained at least 120 social insurance stamps from working in employment corresponding to their IEK specialty, meaning it can to choose the right for exemption from a practical training. Public ΙΕΚ school is not responsible for finding internships for its students, and it is determined individually by each public IEK student to find.

According to the regulation amendment for the Institute of Vocational Training (IEK) operation by the Ministry of Education, Article 3(B) of the Ministerial Decision K1/54877 Government Gazette 1245/B/11-4-2017, a IEK specialty can operate an IEK Apprenticeship programme (scheme) when has intake at least ten IEK students (apprentices; Greek: μαθητευόμενοι) of specialty related to the apprenticeship and after an approval decision taken by the General Secretariat for Vocational Education, Training, and Life-long Learning (GGEEK&DBM).

In the event that a number of student candidates from a public IEK specialty are greater than the available apprenticeship student positions offered, students being admitted based on Grade Point Average (GPA) of their marks earned in the public IEK third and fourth semester. The maximum number of students that can register in a given IEK Apprenticeship programme is up to thirty (30). Students must be off-term employment at the time of the apprenticeship enrollment and throughout the time period during which the apprenticeship is being carried out.

== Qualifications and accreditation ==
=== Certificate of Vocational Training ===
The Certificate of Vocational Training (BEK) (Greek: Βεβαίωση Επαγγελματικής Εκπαίδευσης - ΒΕΚ) signifies completion of four semesters of full-time post-secondary vocational education and training (VET) programme of 1200 hours at IEK classes and 960 hours from an internship or apprenticeship programme. Certificate of Vocational Training (BEK) is also known as Attestation of Studies, Certificate of Completion, Certificate of Graduation, Certificate of Attendance.

=== Diploma of Vocational Education and Training / Accreditation ===
Graduates from a public or private IEKs having a Certificate of Vocational Training entitles eligible them to participate, if they wish, in the qualifying examinations of the National Accreditation Examinations (Greek: Εξετάσεις Πιστοποίησης) will be held at EOPPEP examination centers of Attica (Athens), Central Macedonia (Thessaloniki), Eastern Macedonia and Thrace (Komotini), Peloponnese (Tripoli), Western Greece (Patra), Thessaly (City of Larissa), Epirus (City of Ioannina), Crete (Heraklion), North Aegean (Mytilene), South Aegean (Rhodos). Once, they have been passed all examinations then are awarded Diploma of Vocational Education and Training (VET) (Greek: Δίπλωμα Επαγγελματικής Εκπαίδευσης και Κατάρτισης), also known as Certified EOPPEP Diploma of Vocational Education and Training (VET), or Vocational Training Diploma, that denotes to a level of knowledge equivalent to a Level 5 of the National Qualification Framework (NQF) of Greece which is officially named Hellenic Qualification Framework (HQF) (Greek: Ελληνικό Πλαίσιο Προσόντων), to European Qualifications Framework (EQF) (Greek: Ευρωπαϊκό Πλαίσιο Προσόντων) Level 5, to ISCED Level 4. Information for the existing professional accreditation updates of each programme of study can be accessed through the EOPPEP's website. The Diploma of Vocational Education and Training (VET) is awarded by the EOPPEP.

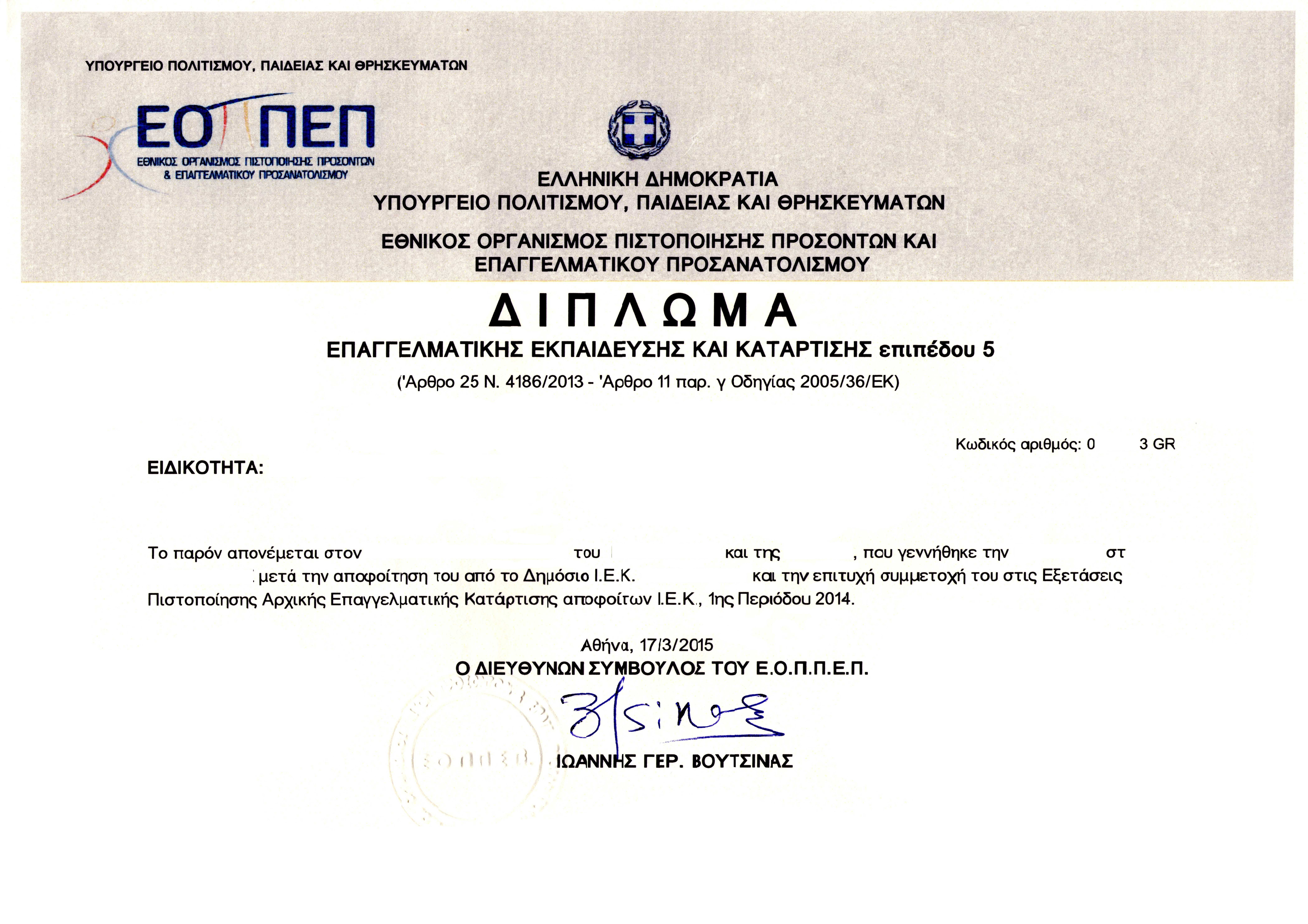
Vocational Training Diploma

=== Certificate supplement ===
A Certificate Supplement of Europass is available in Greek and English, awarded by the EOPPEP – National Europass Centre of Greece. It is a document that includes additional information and standardised description about the content and status of the qualification of studies, ensuring that qualifications are easily understood, especially the country where they were awarded, but not guarantee recognition – it is not a CV nor a substitute qualification for the original and does not have any legal status in itself. Students can submit their applications at the EOPPEP, which also issues the Certificate Supplement.

== Organization ==
The IEK system of study is grouped into fields of study (sectors) which are further divided into departments and each department is then further subdivided into several schools of study (specialties). When a field of study does not have departments, the field is by without departments containing only schools. All IEK programmes of study (specialties) run in terms of demand and vary by different geographical locations depending on the decisions issued, while over time can be changed, updated, completely withdrawn, replaced or new can be launched. The fields of study (academic disciplines) are:

- Agriculture, Food Technology, Nutrition
- Applied Arts and Art Studies
- Business Administration and Economics
- Communication and Mass Media
- Separate Programmes of Study
- Hospitality and Tourism
- Health and Welfare
- Maritime Professions
- Technology Applications
