= Trillin =

Trillin is a surname. Notable people with the surname include:

- Alice Stewart Trillin (1938–2001), American educator, author, film producer, and muse
- Calvin Trillin (born 1935), American journalist, humorist, food writer, poet, memoirist, and novelist
