= CUNY SEEK =

City University of New York program

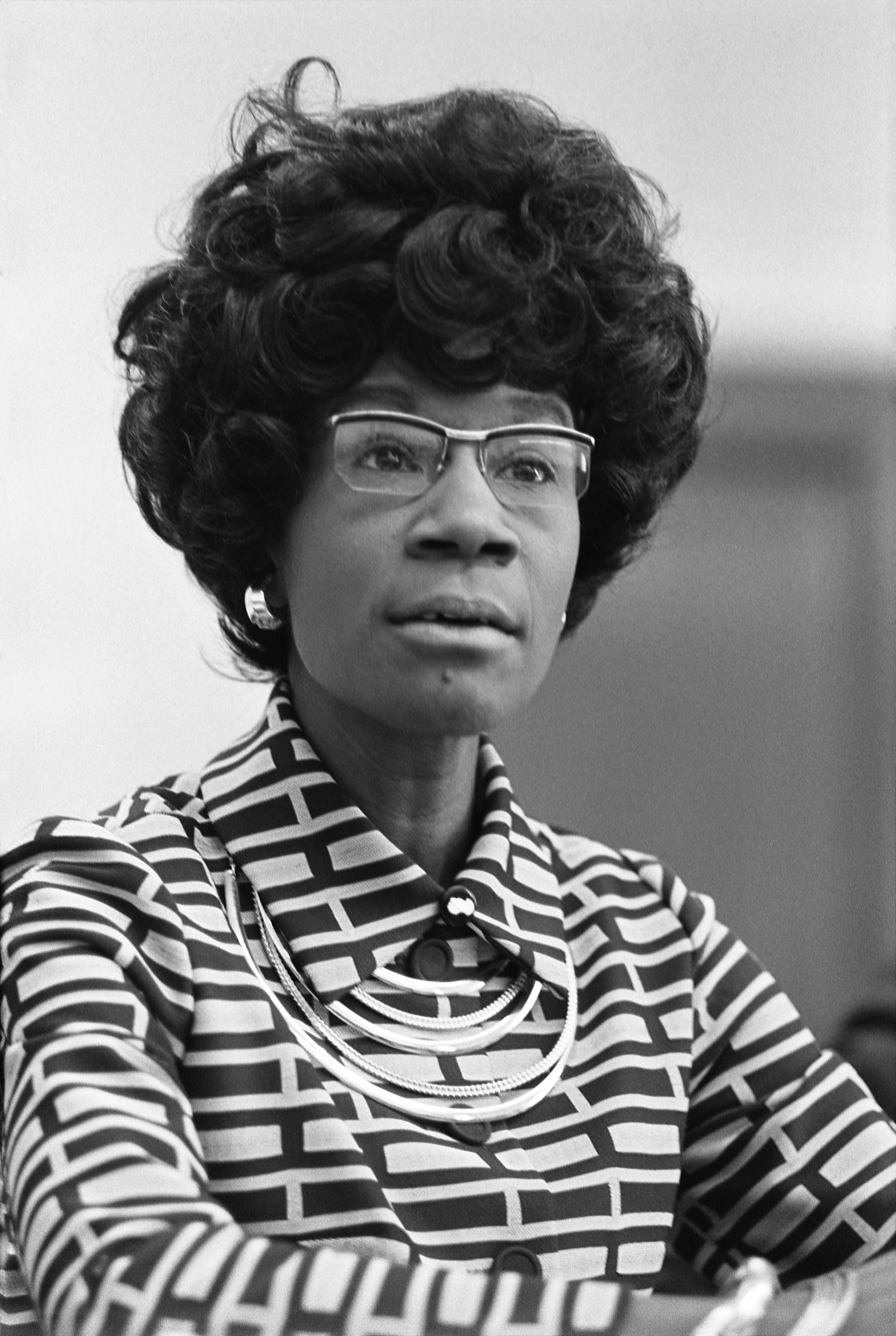
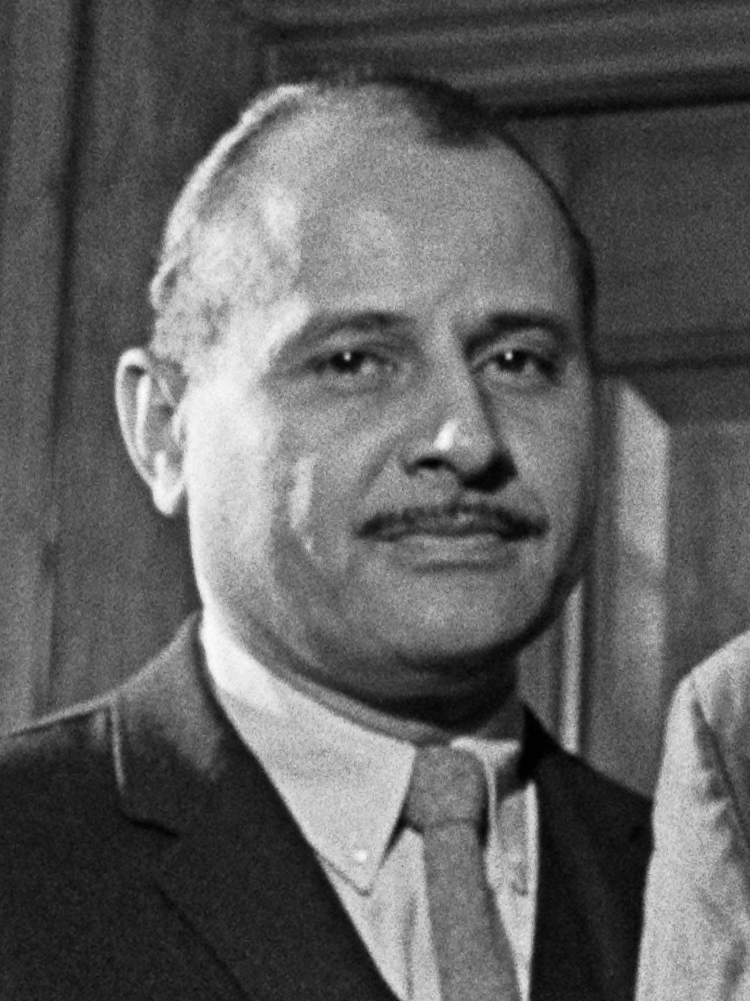
Shirley Chisholm and Percy Sutton were seen as the legislative champions of the SEEK program.

The CUNY SEEK initiative, standing for Search for Education, Elevation [orig. Enlightenment], and Knowledge, is a City University of New York scholarship program for four-year colleges. Championed by New York State Assembly members Shirley Chisholm and Percy Sutton who led a 1966 "midnight march" in the state capital, it was incorporated into a larger CUNY spending bill that year. SEEK was conceived at the time as a policy of racial inclusion to promote greater participation of disadvantaged students from New York City high schools predominantly of African American and Puerto Rican backgrounds.

Its current full title is the Percy Ellis Sutton Search for Education, Elevation, and Knowledge (SEEK) Program, aligned with the 'College Discovery (CD) Program' for CUNY's community colleges, along with other state efforts such as the Higher Education Opportunity Program.

== Legislation ==
SEEK's legal foundations came from New York State Assembly members Shirley Chisholm and Percy Sutton (the eventual program namesake), who led a 1966 "midnight walk" or "midnight march" in Albany to the Dewitt Clinton Hotel room of Speaker Anthony J. Travia. During the 176th New York State Legislature, Travia had become dependent on minority legislators for his leadership amid the reapportionment revolution, and they established the New York State Black and Puerto Rican Legislative Caucus at that late-night meeting with the funding of SEEK as their initial legislative demand, that they had earlier worked out as an amendment at the Harlem office of the New York Amsterdam News.

It was attached as a condition for passing the much larger City University Supplemental Aid and Construction Act that had first been proposed in the New York State Senate chamber by Manfred Ohrenstein. Buffalo-based Arthur Eve joined Chisolm and Sutton as sponsors of the legislation. SEEK is historically seen as an early affirmative action program, but without being based on explicit racial criteria. Instead it was in support of students from high schools in "poverty areas" as to be determined by the city's Anti-Poverty Operations Board, often equated with "ghetto schools" at the time. The first year's cohort was just 113 students, and funds flowed through the New York City Comptroller.

SEEK, with its original stated goal "To advance the cause of equality of educational opportunity", developed in the wake of the federal Civil Rights Act of 1964 and the Higher Education Act of 1965. The 'College Discovery (CD) Program' for community colleges had also emerged the year previous, and SEEK itself served as a model for the Higher Education Opportunity Program for private colleges and the Educational Opportunity Program (EOP) for SUNY, both sponsored by and subsequently named after Eve. Chisholm often spoke of SEEK as being her proudest achievement as a state legislator. New York was one of the first of 14 states to implement college access programs of this type over the next two years. SEEK has also been acknowledged by Congress as an influence on the Federal TRIO Programs.

After Sutton's death at the end on 2009, Assembly member Keith L. T. Wright (at the urging of a retired Eve) sponsored a bill renaming the program after him, which passed into law in July 2010 during the 198th New York State Legislature.

== Implementation ==
Pamphlet of Queens College SEEK Program, ca. 1976

Originating in September 1965 as a Rockefeller-funded City College's Pre-Baccalaureate (Pre-Bac) program, it expanded throughout the CUNY system as Operation SEEK after the state legislation was passed the following year.

Mina P. Shaughnessy led SEEK in its formative years starting in 1967 and there developed the concept of basic writing. It was still a relatively small program concentrated at City College, with participating students there protesting for improvements to the program in 1969. It was subsequently grown in size after 1970 in support of the open admissions policy, which SEEK itself helped to pave the way for. The program suffered with the fiscal crisis of 1975 and the end of free tuition policy, as well as changes in testing systems that followed.
