= Judith Summerfield =

American university scholar/teacher

Judith Pearl Summerfield is an American scholar, teacher, curriculum/program developer, and writer. Professor Emeritus of English at Queens College of the City University of New York (CUNY), she served as University Dean for Undergraduate Education (2003-2009) at CUNY, and Dean for General Education at Queens College from 2009 until her retirement in 2015. Author or editor of ten books, she has received a number of awards for her work, notably the 1986 Modern Language Association (MLA) Mina Shaughnessy Award for the best book on pedagogy and the New York State Professor of the Year award by the Carnegie Foundation for the Advancement of Teaching (1998). In 2018, Summerfield was named a Distinguished Alumnus by the University of Pittsburgh School of Education.

== Education and Teaching ==
Summerfield earned a B.A. (Magna Cum Laude) with an English and History double major and an M.A. in English from the University of Pittsburgh (1960, 1963). She completed teacher certification and taught English and history at Schenley High School in Pittsburgh, Pennsylvania. She then worked as a research assistant in Robert Glaser's Learning, Research and Development Center at Pitt and also taught composition and literature as a graduate assistant in the English Department.

Summerfield began teaching in New York City in the 1970s, first as a part-time instructor at Bronx Community College, and then, at Queens College, CUNY, at the start of the Open Admissions plan that guaranteed every New York City high school graduate a place in CUNY, tuition free. If they did not meet entrance standards, Open Admissions students were required at some of the colleges to enroll in "remedial" courses to improve their proficiencies in reading, writing, and mathematics.

Summerfield played a central role in the Queens English Project, a federally funded program that brought high school and college teachers together to build pathways for student success, while offering free tutoring in writing, reading, and math. Leaders of the project included Robert Lyons, who was Director of Composition at the time, and a key figure in the national writing movement. His essay on City College professor Mina Shaughnessy in The Journal of Basic Writing details Shaughnessy's seminal role in the development of the CUNY writing programs. Also teaching in the Queens English project was Donald McQuade and the poet and scholar, Marie Ponsot, a professor at Queens, who led writing workshops for all who were teaching or tutoring in the project. Ponsot insisted that for faculty to teach writing, they also needed to write.

Summerfield was hired first as a part-time lecturer in the Writing Skills Workshop (a tutoring program) at Queens College, and eventually became the full-time director of the Workshop. Using qualitative research methods drawn from sociolinguistics, particularly the work of William Labov, Summerfield began to investigate why students made the choices they did in language use (speaking, reading, and writing). Out of the exercises she created for her research, she co-authored her first textbook, The Random House Guide to Writing, with a colleague, Sandra Schor. The book was published in three editions and led to her becoming a participant in the emerging national writing debates and projects.

Summerfield became Director of Composition at Queens College, working with graduate teaching assistants to develop an expansive writing curriculum, influenced by the London Schools Council, particularly the work of James N. Britton. Completing doctoral studies in English Education at the Steinhardt School of Culture, Education, and Human Development, New York University, she entered the ranks of the tenure-track faculty at Queens College and was promoted to Full Professor in the English Department in 1994. Her dissertation, Narrative Compositions: An Exploration of Narrative in the Teaching of College Composition (1986), is an exploration of the rich storytelling cultures that students bring to the classroom, and the importance of narrative in our daily lives.

== Academic Administration ==
In the 1990s, Summerfield designed and developed the Freshman Year Initiative (FYI) at Queens College, bringing together college faculty from across the disciplines to teach first-year students, and to critically examine liberal education requirements. The Queens College Freshman Year Initiative, which was supported by the U.S. Department of Education Fund for the Improvement of Postsecondary Education (FIPSE), received the 1996 Theodore M. Hesburgh Award for enhancing undergraduate education.

Success in building faculty-student communities led to her being named University Dean of Undergraduate Education at the Central Office of The City University of New York. She developed projects with faculty and administrators from the twenty-four CUNY colleges to strengthen the undergraduate experience. Her two co-edited collections of essays, written with CUNY colleagues, grew out of the project. She became a CUNY project director in Lee Shulman's Carnegie Scholarship of Teaching (CASTL) national network of college reformers. After a change of administration at CUNY in 2009, she returned to Queens College as the Dean of General Education until her retirement in 2015. During those years, she continued her work on building community among faculty to strengthen a liberal education.

== Recent Projects ==
In 2015, Summerfield published A Man Comes from Someplace: Stories, History, Memory from a Lost Time, which she introduced at the International Jewish Festival sponsored by the Jewish Community Centre of Kraków. The book, now in a revised and expanded second edition (2018), documents the stories her father told of Ukraine before emigrating to the U.S. in 1920, his journey to America, and his experience as an immigrant. Summerfield also narrates her trip to the village of Novokonstantinov, Ukraine in 2011, to meet with local people and investigate the landscape of her father's memories.

She has been invited to present on her recent books and offer writing workshops at the Heinz History Center in Pittsburgh, a World Health Organization conference in Stockholm, the Holocaust Educators Network in New York City, Westchester Jewish Center and at the Woman's Philanthropic Club of Larchmont. The University of Pittsburgh, honored her with a Distinguished Alumnus Award from its School of Education (2018) and the Pitt English Department Composition Program invited her to speak on her career in 2016. Out of those experiences, Summerfield was inspired to write Compositions, A Life: An Autoethnography (2024), a narrative and ethnographic examination of her experiences as a student, and her teaching and research career in higher education.

== Publications ==
- Fishman, Judith [Summerfield]. Responding to Prose: A Reader for Writers. New York: Random House-McGraw Hill, 1983.
- Summerfield, Judith, and Sandra Schor. The Random House Guide to Writing. 3rd ed. New York: Random House, 1986. (Second Edition, 1981; First Edition, The Random House to Basic Writing, 1978.)
- Frames of Mind: A Course in Composition. New York: Random House, 1986.
- Texts and Contexts: A Contribution to the Theory and Practice of Teaching Composition. New York: Random House 1986. (Winner of the Modern Language Association Mina P. Shaughnessy Prize, 1987.)
- Summerfield, Judith, and Geoffrey Summerfield. Reading(s). New York: Random House, 1989.
- Summerfield, Judith. Negotiations: A Reader for Writers. New York: McGraw Hill, Random House, 1991.
- Summerfield, Judith, and Crystal Benedicks, Eds. Reclaiming the Public University: Conversations on Liberal and General Education. New York: Peter Lang, 2007.
- Summerfield, Judith and Cheryl Smith, Eds. Making Teaching and Learning Matter: Transformative Spaces in Higher Education, Springer, 2011.
- Summerfield, Judith. A Man Comes from Someplace: Stories, History, Memory from a Lost Time, Second Edition. Leiden: Brill/Sense Publishers, 2018. First Edition: Rotterdam: Sense Publishers, 2015.
- Compositions, A Life: An Autoethnography. Peter Lang Group AG, 2024. ISBN 9781433194641
