= Errors and Expectations =

Errors and Expectations: A Guide for the Teacher of Basic Writing, published in 1977 by Oxford University Press, by Mina P. Shaughnessy, was the first book-length investigation of writing problems experienced by under-prepared college freshmen. At the time of the book’s publication, Shaughnessy was the director of the Instructional Resource Center and an associate dean of CUNY, having previously worked both as a basic writing (BW) instructor and the director of basic writing at City College in New York.

The book grew out of Shaughnessy’s nine years’ experience teaching basic writing to open admissions students. Overwhelmed by the error-ridden compositions produced by her students, she systematically analyzed 4,000 placement essays written by incoming freshmen at City College in order to better understand the logic of student errors in composition. This research—funded in part by the Carnegie Foundation grant—coupled with her own experience provides the foundation of the book which seeks both to inform basic writing instructors and provide them with a means for approaching their students’ areas of weakness. Perhaps the central and most important observation Shaughnessy makes is that there is a pattern to student error.

Shaughnessy’s research centered around the theory that basic writing students write with deficiencies not because they are incapable or disadvantaged, but because they are unskilled beginners who like all beginners of any discipline must learn by mistakes and with much practice.

== Summary ==
Errors and Expectations devotes a chapter to eight of the (at the time) most salient considerations in basic writing. Each chapter follows a three-pronged format: first, a range of examples; second, an explanation of causes of the problems; and third, suggestions with which to approach the problems. Although more than forty years have passed since the book’s original publication date, the majority of the information remains pertinent and insightful today.

Chapter 1: Introduction. Shaughnessy discusses the background of the open admissions movement, detailing her own experience when she begins to grade the essays produced by her first group of open admissions students and finds herself unprepared to proceed in spite of previous years of experience in teaching composition. She also provides a rationale for her focus on error, explaining the realities of academia, the ways in which errors are viewed, and the relationship between reader and writer.

Chapter 2: Handwriting and punctuation. After briefly discussing handwriting, the bulk of the chapter (27 of 29 pages) focuses on the myriad ways in which basic writers use and misuse punctuation. In order to understand the logic behind the errors, Shaughnessy explores the concept of the sentence and the differences between spoken and written English. Commas, periods, and capitalization are the primary elements examined.

Chapter 3: Syntax. Four general categories of error are examined (accidental errors, blurred patterns, consolidation errors, and inversions) in the context of the academic tone which college students are expected to adopt and with which basic writers often struggle as they expand their writing ability.

Chapter 4: Common errors. Shaughnessy provides examples in the primary problem areas of verbs, nouns, pronouns, and subject-verb agreement before discussing the discouragement felt by teachers and students alike as they approach the recurring common errors present in student writing. She offers simple suggestions for reducing error and provides a thorough diagnostic test.

Chapter 5: Spelling. Shaughnessy first makes a distinction between misspelling and incorrectly inflecting various parts of speech before classifying spelling mistakes under four heads: problems with the spelling system, incongruities between spoken and written English, ignorance of spelling rules, and the inexperienced eye. She suggests nine steps in addressing spelling problems and warns against two general assumptions—that adult students can’t be taught how to spell correctly and that spelling can only be taught one way.

Chapter 6: Vocabulary. Basic writing students enter college without having developed the vocabulary of academia, a slow-growing task that generally takes years to accomplish. Shaughnessy compares the writing of basic, intermediate, and advanced freshman writers to discuss their vocabulary skills and the depth of ideas investigated through vocabulary. She also indicates basic writing students’ needs as they approach vocabulary-rich courses (such as biology or anatomy).

Chapter 7: Beyond the sentence. Although many teachers complain that basic writing students lack ideas, Shaughnessy claims that their ideas are hidden by their novice skills and attempts at elaboration. She suggests three needs specific to BW students: how to arrive at a main idea, how to see and create structure in writing, and how to recognize specific patterns that link together sentences and paragraphs.

Chapter 8: Expectations. Shaughnessy discusses the powerful link between expectations and achievement, showing sample essays from the beginning and end of a semester course and citing statistics that demonstrate the effectiveness of basic writing courses.

== Reception and influence ==
Over 12,000 hardcover copies were sold within six months after it was published (the typical number for a scholarly book with a focused topic was 1,000), and by 1979, more than 40,000 paperback copies had been sold. The book has been cited as one of the most important and influential studies of basic writing, relevant for teachers of both remedial courses and writing in general. Errors and Expectations is regarded as required reading that should be referenced by a teacher of basic writing as well as teachers of any discipline to improve student writing and encourages teachers to develop a pedagogy that respect the adult learner and begin instruction where the student is.

Errors and Expectations is regarded as a handbook of strategies to "remediate error" in the student as well as the teacher. This is a significant statement as it shifts the teacher’s perspective that basic writing students are remedial - bad and need correcting, when in fact it is the students' errors that require study and correction as well as a teachers perspectives – in becoming a student themselves of new disciplines and of his/her students in order to grasp their basic writing challenges and developing skills.

In more recent years, Shaughnessy's work has been criticized for a variety of reasons: devoting so much time to grammar instruction; categorizing only the errors of finished products, rather than the errors of each draft; and focusing so completely on error, despite the fact that she herself insists that error correction should not be the only focus of a basic writing course.
