= Behind the Scenes (American TV series) =

- Presented by: Penn Jillette; Teller
- Starring: Penn Jillette; Teller
- Country of origin: United States
- No. of episodes: 10

Production
- Executive producers: Alice Trillin; Jane Garmey
- Running time: 28–30 minutes
- Production company: Learning Designs

Original release
- Network: PBS
- Release: September 6 – November 8, 1992

Behind the Scenes is a 10-part television miniseries aimed towards 8- to 12-year-olds about various aspects of the arts, that was broadcast on PBS in 1992. The series was executive produced by Alice Stewart Trillin and Jane Garmey, produced and directed by Ellen Hovde and Muffie Meyer, and hosted by Penn & Teller. It was developed to illuminate the creative process underlying the working of artists.

== Format ==
The series used a wide variety of short films, computer animation, and music to illustrate certain abstractions associated with the artistic process. Each of Penn & Teller's skits were specifically geared towards demonstrating an aspect of that episode's theme.

"'To show rhythmic patterns in a song, we produce a mouse each time the pattern goes one way and when there is a variation, we produce a frog,' Teller said. 'This continues until there are quite a number of mice and frogs all over the place.'"

"Penn and Teller said they didn't want to talk down to the series' young viewers. 'Kids tend to be desperately curious,' Teller said. 'There is a certain element we are doing in this that is making the analogy between the arts and a magic trick. When you think of something like perspective in a painting, it really is a magic trick.'"

== Episodes ==
| Ep. # | Title | Featured artist | Additional artists | Central theme(s) | Comments |
|---|---|---|---|---|---|
| 1 | "Drawing: Illusion of Depth" | David Hockney | Bobby McFerrin | Drawing | |
| 2 | "Framing" | Carrie Mae Weems | | Photography | |
| 3 | "Texture" | JoAnn Falletta | | Music | |
| 4 | "Line" | Wayne Thiebaud | Matt Groening | | |
| 5 | "Setting a Scene" | Julie Taymor | | Theatre | Featured scenes from Taymor's production of William Shakespeare's The Tempest |
| 6 | "Melody" | Allen Toussaint | Jane Ira Bloom, Bobby McFerrin | Music | |
| 7 | "Color" | Robert Gil de Montes | | | |
| 8 | "Pattern" | David Parsons | B.H. Barry | Dance | |
| 9 | "Rhythm" | Max Roach | MC Lyte, The Blue Man Group | Music | |
| 10 | "Balance" | Nancy Graves | | Sculpture | |
