= Alice Stewart Trillin =

American educator and writer (1938–2001)

- Born: Alice Stewart; May 8, 1938; Port Chester, New York, U.S.
- Died: September 11, 2001 (aged 63); New York City, U.S.
- Education: Wellesley College; Yale University
- Occupations: Educator, author, film producer
- Known for: Work with cancer patients
- Spouse: Calvin Trillin (m. 1965)

Alice Stewart Trillin (May 8, 1938 – September 11, 2001) was an American educator, author, film producer and longtime muse to her husband, author Calvin Trillin. Diagnosed with lung cancer in the 1970s, she wrote about her experience and became known for her work with cancer patients. Alice Trillin is a recurring subject in Calvin Trillin's writings, including his 2006 book titled About Alice. She ultimately died from heart failure related to the radiation therapy that her cancer was treated with.

== Early life ==
Alice Stewart was born in Port Chester, New York, to Dorothy and James Stewart, a businessman and inventor specializing in coin changers of vending machines. After attending public school in Harrison, New York she earned a B.A. from Wellesley College in 1960 and an M.A. in English from Yale University in 1961. She subsequently taught English at Hofstra University and at the City University of New York, where she became a writing program specialist.

She married Calvin "Bud" Trillin in 1965 after having met him at a party hosted by Victor Navasky. She regularly made appearances in Trillin's writings – including books such as American Fried, Alice, Let's Eat and Third Helpings – often as the voice of calm reason. Bud Trillin acknowledged that his writings created an impression of Alice as "a dietitian in sensible shoes" – which was perhaps not matched by reality.

== Career ==
Trillin's interest in curriculum development led her to consult for WNET television station and help it design new approaches to educational programming. She formed a company "Learning Designs" to produce educational television series, such as Behind the Scenes, starring the illusionist duo Penn & Teller, aiming to teach pre-teens about the creative process in the visual and performing arts. The series won several awards including the Japan Prize (Best of Festival) in the largest international children's film festival.

Trillin was also a major part of open admissions and basic writing at City College, New York. Prior to teaching at City College, she taught at Hofstra where, in 1964, she met the recently hired Mina P. Shaughnessy. The two were instant friends. While at Hofstra, Trillin received the Samuel Rubin Foundation to set up "Project NOAH", a project designed to assist and tutor minority students.

In November 1966, Herbert Kohl published an article titled "Teaching the 'Unteachable,' The Story of an Experiment in Creative Writing", which greatly moved Trillin. She discussed it with Kohl and later with Leslie Berger at City College. When Trillin first met with Berger in 1967, he instantly hired her into City's Pre-Baccalaureate program. Trillin spoke so highly of Shaughnessy that she was also given an interview and position. With the budget cuts of the mid-1970s, Trillin worked for Shaughnessy as a "skills expert" in CUNY's midtown offices.

== Cancer diagnosis ==
Trillin developed lung cancer, apparently as a result of exposure to second-hand smoke during her childhood. She wrote of her experience as a cancer patient in an article titled "Of Dragons and Garden Peas: A Cancer Patient Talks to Doctors", in the New England Journal of Medicine in 1981. Her writing is still used to train doctors to appreciate the illness and its treatment from a patient's point of view.

Her personal experience also led Trillin to reach out to care for other cancer patients. At Trillin's funeral service, Nora Ephron described the people under Trillin's protection as "anyone she loved, or liked, or knew, or didn't quite know but knew someone who did, or didn't know from a hole in a wall but had just gotten a telephone call from because they'd found the number in the telephone book."

In 1979, Trillin learned that her friend Victor Navasky's 12-year-old son, Bruno Navasky, had been diagnosed with cancer. A letter she wrote to Navasky, describing her own experiences and attempting to cheer him, was later published in a book form titled Dear Bruno. The book was illustrated by New Yorker artist Edward Koren.

Alice and Calvin Trillin were volunteer counselors at actor Paul Newman's Hole in the Wall Gang Camp in Connecticut for children with cancer or serious blood diseases.

== Death ==
Trillin died on September 11, 2001, aged 63, at the New York Presbyterian Hospital, from heart failure resulting from radiation damage sustained when she was treated for lung cancer a quarter century earlier, in 1976. Eight months before her death, Trillin's essay "Betting your life" on doctors, illness and family was published in The New Yorker. Her death was largely overlooked by the media as she died on the same day as the September 11 attacks.

== Selected works ==
- A.S. Trillin, E. Koren (Illustrator), Dear Bruno, New Press, 1996, ISBN 1-56584-057-7
- A.S. Trillin, "Of Dragons and Garden Peas: A Cancer Patient Talks to Doctors", New England Journal of Medicine, 304 (12), pp. 699–701, March 19, 1981.
- A.S. Trillin, "Betting your life", The New Yorker, January 29, 2001.
