= School leaving qualification =

Academic qualification

A school leaving qualification is an academic qualification awarded for the completion of secondary education. Depending on the country or region, it may alternatively be known as a high school diploma, senior secondary leaving certificate, high schools general certificate or school certificate (amongst other names).

Institutional requirements differ for obtaining a high school diploma or its equivalent. For example, some schools require that all students study a foreign language, and others do not. The number of years that students are required to attend school before earning a high school diploma, the difficulty level of the classes, and the types of classes vary significantly from place to place.

== Names and equivalents ==
In the United States, the qualification is known as a high school diploma. The same name is used for the equivalent qualification awarded in Canada.

In England and Wales, the school-leaving qualifications awarded are either General Certificate of Education (GCE) A Level or Business and Technology Education Council (BTEC) qualifications, depending on the student's choice; students pursue these qualifications after taking General Certificate of Secondary Education exams (GCSEs) at the ages of 14–16 (Years 10 and 11). In Scotland, one qualification is known as the Advanced Higher, which is preceded by the Scottish Higher, the basic university entrance qualification. In Ireland, the qualification is the Irish Leaving Certificate.

In Italy, Switzerland, Albania, Czech Republic, Poland, Austria, Hungary, Bulgaria, Bosnia and Herzegovina, Croatia, Slovakia, Slovenia, and several other countries in Europe, the qualification is known as the Matura. In Italy it is defined as "Diploma di maturità." In Germany, the qualification is the Abitur. In France, the qualification is Le Baccalauréat. In Romania, the qualification is the Romanian Baccalaureate. In Israel, the equivalent qualification is known as the Bagrut, which means "maturity" in Hebrew. In Belgium (French community), the qualification is officially called CESS (Certificat d'enseignement secondaire supérieur, certificate for upper-secondary learning).

In South Africa, the equivalent nowadays is the National Senior Certificate however it was previously or is more commonly known as the Matriculation (Matric) Certificate. In Gambia, Ghana, Liberia, Nigeria, and Sierra Leone, the equivalent is the West African Senior School Certificate. In Zimbabwe, the school-leaving qualification is the ZIMSEC GCE Advanced Level which is preceded by the ZIMSEC GCE Ordinary Level.

The School Leaving Certificate is a certification obtained by a student on successful completion of an examination at the end of study at the schooling level in India. Affidavit for SLC can be obtained here.

== Past diploma styles ==
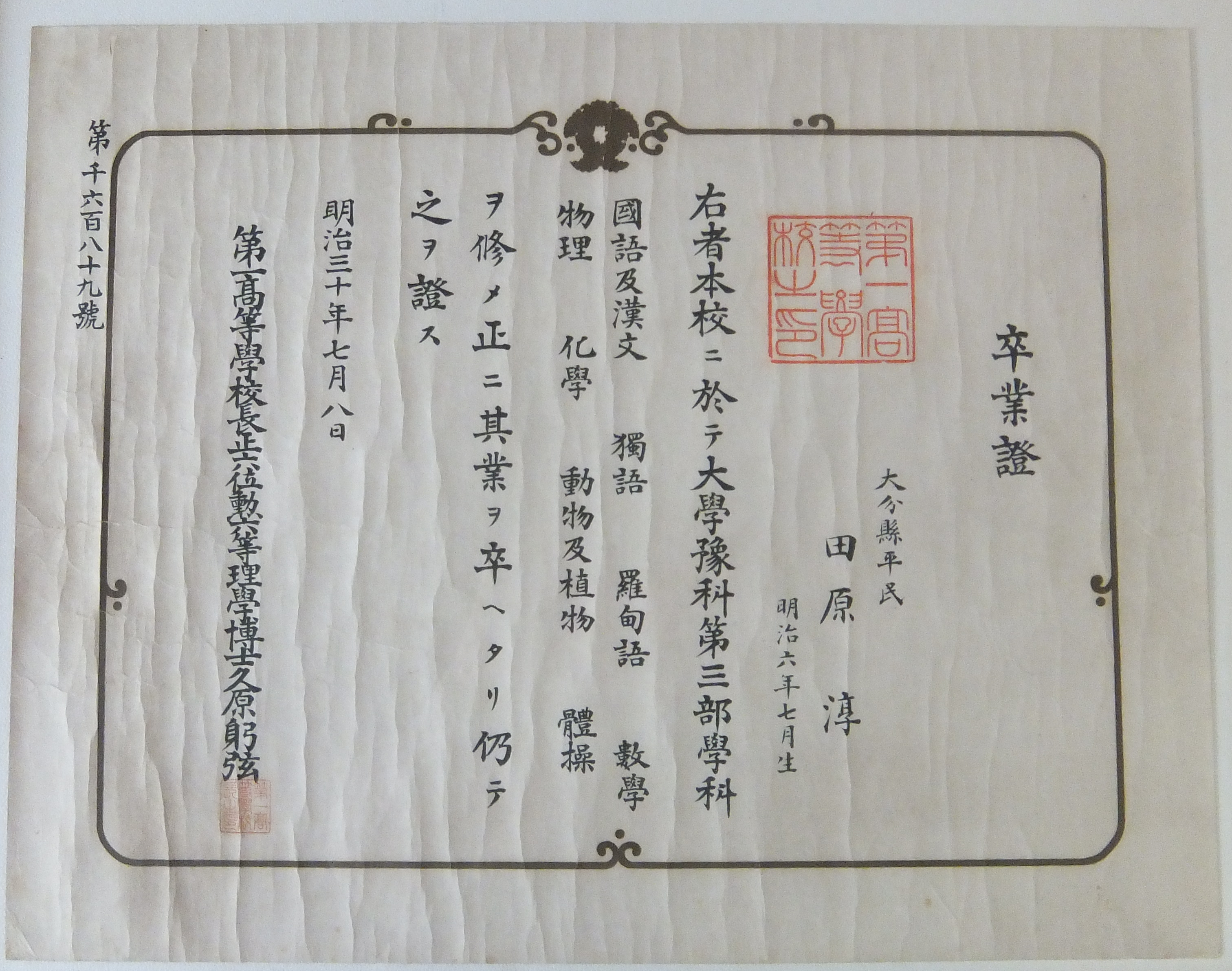
A Japanese high school diploma from 1897

Diplomas were originally made of sheepskin, as paper was not very durable and was difficult to create. The sheepskin was made paper thin and information was handwritten. Soon, parchment was used for the diploma.

Diplomas used to be quite large, but it has become common to print diplomas on standard letter or A4 size paper. Another difference is the method with which diplomas are handed out. Older diplomas were often rolled and tied with ribbon, but diplomas may also be presented in leather binders or framed with wood and glass. In some cases, blank papers are handed out in graduation ceremonies, and the official diploma is delivered at a later date.

== Requirements for receiving a diploma ==
Most countries around the world award high school diplomas on the basis of completing appropriate coursework and passing one or more standardized tests. Every country has different requirements for receiving a diploma, and in some cases, individual schools set their own requirements. Requirements also change over time. There is no single, universal set of requirements for receiving a high school diploma. Every time and place has different requirements.

A person who qualifies for a diploma, but has not yet received it, is called a graduand; after receiving it, the person is called a graduate.

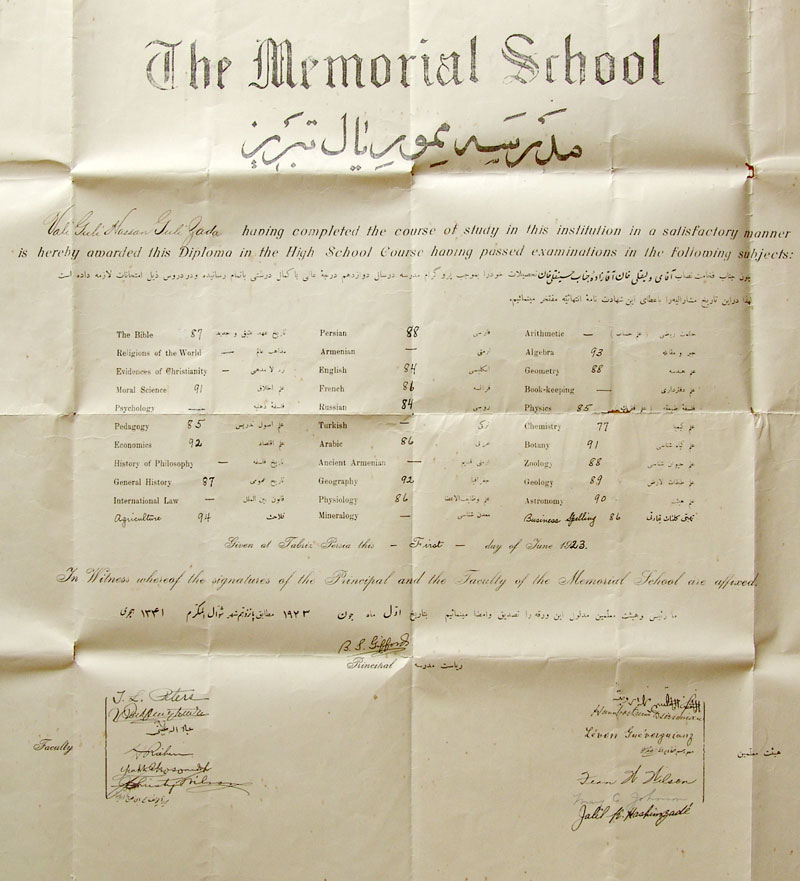
This Iranian diploma from 1923 lists the student's grades.

Education systems based on the British model have independently marked national examinations for each subject instead of a High School Diploma — General Certificate of Secondary Education in England and Wales, School Leaving Certificates in Ireland, Higher Grade Examination in Scotland, and IGCSE/AICE internationally. Caribbean Examination Council Certificates are also given to students in the Caribbean after completion of a five years of secondary education, and are accepted regionally and internationally.

European schools use the Baccalaureate system. The International Baccalaureate (IB) is becoming increasingly popular worldwide.

In the United States, most states require students to take and pass a standardized test before graduation. The curriculum and implementation has varied depending upon the state. Florida uses the English, Welsh and Northern Irish A-Level program (called Advanced International Certificate of Education) for advanced students while a number of schools in Virginia use the IGCSE. General education students who pass the twelfth grade in the US by completing enough classes, but do not meet all of the standard graduation requirements, will not receive a high school diploma, but will instead receive a certificate of attendance. Schools may offer the Cambridge International Examinations, the International Baccalaureate, and/or Advanced Placement program in addition to the high school diploma for advanced students. Schools may also offer dual-enrollment programs that enable students to earn university academic credit and a high school diploma simultaneously.

Australia has six state-based systems and two territory-based systems, which have different curricula, standards and pathways, all of which produce a common Australian Tertiary Admission Rank which is recognised nationally. Several Australian private schools, and a number of public schools in the state of South Australia, offer the IB as an alternative.

== Graduation ==
In some countries, the high school diploma is the symbol of having successfully completed the basic education required by law for youths. Because of this, the presentation of the high-school diploma has become a rite of passage into adulthood, that is steeped in ritual. The high school diploma is given to students at a ceremony called high-school graduation. Students who have passed their courses will have their names called out, walk across a stage, and be handed their diplomas. Sometimes, students receive blank pieces of paper wrapped with a ribbon or empty leather binders during the graduation ceremony; when this occurs the actual diploma is received later.

== Types of diplomas ==
Some categories of high school diploma programs include:

- Honors diploma, for student with strong academic achievements. This may include the Latin honors system used by some universities for undergraduate degrees.
- College preparation, for students whose coursework and grades meet the minimum entrance requirements for public universities in that area.
- Technical or vocational, for students who have completed a technical training program, such as an automobile repair, cosmetology, or information technology program.
- Minimal, for students who complete the bare minimum requirements for graduation. This is accepted as a true high school diploma, but may not be sufficient for direct entry into certain universities in the United States.
- Certificate of Attendance, for students who meet the attendance requirements for secondary school but do not complete the requirements for graduation. This is not generally considered a true high school diploma.
- Certificate of Completion, for students with disabilities who have completed their individual Individualized Education Program (IEP) goals but did not meet requirements for high school diploma. This, like the certificate of attendance, is not generally considered a true high school diploma.

At most American schools, these are the same diplomas with different notations or endorsements. With the exception of those receiving a certificate of completion or a certificate of attendance, the recipients are all equally considered to be high school graduates with the same basic rights, such as the ability to attend any community college or university that chooses to accept them.

However, in other countries, this is not the case. In some countries, high schools have specialized in certain areas and issue diplomas relevant to their specialty, and a particular type of diploma is normally required for certain purposes, such as attending university. For example, in Germany, three types of diplomas are common:

- Abitur, issued by German Gymnasium schools, which are equivalent to sixth form or college preparation schools. Students who earn an abitur are qualified to attend university.
- Mittlere Reife or Realschulabschluss, issued by Realschule schools, which are equivalent to General Certificate of Secondary Education in the UK.
- Hauptschulabschluss, issued by Hauptschule schools. Students with these usually start an apprenticeship, enroll in a vocational school, or transfer to another school to earn one of the higher level diplomas. Earning the Mittlere Reife or Hauptschulabschluss does not permit the graduate to attend university.

Diplomas may also be available for students who complete special programs, which may be awarded instead of or in addition to the standard high school diploma of a region's schools; these include:

- International Baccalaureate, for students who completed the International Baccalaureate program.
- Advanced Placement International Diploma (APID), for students who complete the Advanced Placement International Diploma program. This is not recognized as a true high school diploma, but may be preferred or required for entry into colleges and universities, especially for students from the United States and Canada studying abroad.
- Access to Higher Education Diploma, for students which lacks qualifications due to an unconventional educational background and want to gain entry into university. The qualification is equivalent to A Levels, although some consider it to be more academically rigorous.
- Cambridge IGCSE, for international schools following the British system of education. This is accepted as equivalent to a US high school diploma, but is insufficient for university entry in the UK.
- Cambridge AICE, for international schools following the British system of education. This is an academic qualification that is accepted for university entry in the UK.

The names of diplomas vary by country and even from region to region within the same country.

== See also ==
- List of school leaving qualifications
- Transcript (education), the list of courses taken and other academic information
- Grade book
- Report card
