= Muffie Meyer =

American director

- Occupation: Director

Marion "Muffie" Meyer is an American director, whose productions include documentaries, theatrical features, television series and children’s films. Films that she directed are the recipients of two Emmy Awards, CINE Golden Eagles, the Japan Prize, Christopher Awards, the Freddie Award, the Columbia-DuPont, and the Peabody Awards. Her work has been selected for festivals in Japan, Greece, London, Edinburgh, Cannes, Toronto, Chicago and New York, and she has been twice nominated by the Directors Guild of America.

== Biography ==
Meyer was born in New York City and raised in Chicago. She graduated from the Chicago Lab School, Grinnell College, and received an MFA from New York University’s film school. Meyer got her start as an assistant editor on the Oscar-winning documentary Woodstock (1970). Her early editing credits include The Lords of Flatbush (1974), starring Sylvester Stallone and Henry Winkler, and The Groove Tube (1974), starring Chevy Chase, a film precursor to Saturday Night Live.

Along with Ellen Hovde and Lynzee Klingman, she edited Gilda Live (1980), starring Gilda Radner, directed by Mike Nichols. Meyer worked with pioneering cinema verité documentarians Albert and David Maysles as one of the directors and editors of Grey Gardens (1975). The critically acclaimed documentary that was released theatrically in 1976 about the Bouvier family was eventually released on DVD by The Criterion Collection. In 2010, it was selected by the Library of Congress to join the National Film Registry.

In 1978, Meyer and Ellen Hovde formed Middlemarch Films, Inc. As Middlemarch, they produced and directed a variety of series and specials for PBS, most of which were written and co-produced by Ronald Blumer. One was the Emmy Award-winning film, An Empire of Reason. Hosted by Cokie Roberts, it featured performances by prominent journalists and politicians Mario Cuomo, Ed Koch, Walter Cronkite, John Chancellor, William F. Buckley, Andrea Mitchell, Phil Donahue, Forrest Sawyer, Robert MacNeil, Al Roker, and many others. Meyer also co-directed (with Ellen Hovde) Enormous Changes at the Last Minute: Virginia's Story, a feature film for ABC, based on stories by Grace Paley. The film was written by Oscar nominee John Sayles, and starred Emmy Award-winning actress Ellen Barkin, Oscar nominee David Strathairn, Ron McLarty, and Kevin Bacon.

While a number of the films Middlemarch produced focus on the founding of America (including the Peabody Award-winning mini-series, Liberty! The American Revolution, and Emmy award winning Benjamin Franklin), their documentary subjects have also included science, medicine, and the arts. Notable among them are: The Crash of 1929, a one-hour program for American Experience, which traces the "New Era" of prosperity that ends with the great stock market crash of 1929; Behind the Scenes, a 10-part series for children on the arts, hosted by Penn and Teller, and featuring celebrated British artist David Hockney, Tony Award-winning director Julie Taymor (The Lion King), jazz legend Max Roach, choreographer David Parsons, and The Simpsons creator Matt Groening; American Photography – a Century of Images, a three-hour series about the impact of photography on America in the 20th century; Dancing, two programs in the international series on dance; The New Medicine, a two-hour special about the humanistic practice of medicine; Saving the National Treasures, a NOVA special about the National Archives’ restoration of the Declaration of Independence; Alexander Hamilton, a two-hour documentary for American Experience, starring Tony Award-winner Brían F. O'Byrne; Dolley Madison, a feature-length documentary for American Experience, starring Tony Award-nominee Eve Best and Tony Award-winner Jefferson Mays.

Meyer is a member of the Directors Guild of America. She has been a guest lecturer at Harvard, Yale, Princeton, New York University, the New York Bar Association, The New School and other colleges and universities. She has also produced videos for corporate clients such as Kodak, Morgan Stanley, Sullivan & Cromwell, Harvard University, Johnson and Johnson, Corning Glassworks, Scholastic, McMillan McGraw-Hill, and American Financial Services Association.

Meyer is married to Ronald Blumer. They have a daughter, Emma, and live in New York City.

== Awards and honors ==
2011, The Cinema Eye Honors for Nonfiction Filmmaking Legacy Award presented to the filmmakers of Grey Gardens at the Museum of the Moving Image in Astoria, New York. The event was broadcast on the Documentary Channel.

2012, Best Documentary, Nickel Independent Film Festival for The Lost Bird Project

2010, Library of Congress Selects Grey Gardens for National Film Registry

2006, The FREDDIE Awards: International Health and Medical Media Award for The New Medicine.

2003, Primetime Emmy Award, Outstanding Non-fiction Special for Benjamin Franklin 1997, George Foster Peabody Award for Excellence in Broadcast Journalism for Liberty! The American Revolution 1997, The Christopher Award for Liberty! The American Revolution.

1997, Nomination, Directors Guild of America Award for Liberty! The American Revolution.

1995, The Christopher Award for Discovering Women: Earth Explorer.

1993, The Japan Prize, International Education Program Contest for "Behind the Scenes" 10-part TV series.

1989, Cine Golden Eagle Film & Video Competition for An Empire of Reason.

1989, Best of Festival, Athens Film Festival & Gold Camera, US Film Festival.

1988, Emmy Award, Outstanding Arts/Cultural/Historical Programming for An Empire of Reason.

1988, Nomination, Directors Guild of America Award, Documentary/ Actuality category for An Empire of Reason.

1981, Cine Golden Eagle Film & Video Competition for Mr. Preble Gets Rid of His Wife (based on the James Thurber short story, the film aired on HBO, PBS and the BBC).

1978, Columbia-DuPont Award for Excellence in Broadcast Journalism for Six American Families: The Burks of Georgia

== Filmography ==
- Grey Gardens (1976)
- Six American Families: The Burks of Georgia (1978)
- Mr. Preble Gets Rid of His Wife (1981)
- Nichols and Dimes (1981)
- Writers Writing: Pieces of a Puzzle
- Enormous Changes at the Last Minute: Virginia's Story (1982)
- 3-2-1 Contact shorts
- Sesame Street shorts
- An Empire of Reason (1988)
- American Experience: The Crash of 1929 (1990)
- Behind the Scenes (1992, 10-part series)
- Dancing: Sex and Social Dance (1993)
- Dancing: The Individual and Tradition (1993)
- Going Broke in America (1995)
- Discovering Women: Earth Explorer (1995)
- Liberty! The American Revolution (1997, six-part series)
- AFI’s 100 Years… 100 Movies: Family Portraits (1998)
- American Photography: A Century of Images (1999)
- Nature: Dogs, The Early Years (2001)
- Benjamin Franklin (2002, three-part series)
- Twyla on Twyla (2004)
- NOVA: Saving the National Treasures (2005)
- The New Medicine (2006)
- American Experience: Alexander Hamilton (2007, two-part series)
- American Experience: Dolley Madison (2010, 90 minutes)
- The Lost Bird Project (2012, 90 minutes)
