= Higher Education Opportunity Program =

Program in the State of New York

The Arthur O. Eve Higher Education Opportunity Program (HEOP) is a partnership between the State of New York and its independent colleges that provides scholarships to economically and educationally disadvantaged residents. It is mainly awarded to underrepresented minority students, such as African Americans and Hispanics.

HEOP is funded jointly by participating colleges and the New York State Arthur O. Eve Higher Education Opportunity Program, and supported, in part, by a grant from the New York State Education Department.

All HEOP students must be New York State residents (including undocumented immigrants) and must meet both financial and academic guidelines. The HEOP program was funded under Title V of the Elementary and Secondary Education Act of 1965 and was approved by Governor Nelson Rockefeller of New York.

The program provides grants ranging from $40,000-$70,000 a year to more than 50 colleges to fund students admitted through HEOP. HEOP ensures full need packaging for all HEOP students and can cover the cost of tuition, room and board, books and potential student fees.

In order to be eligible for the Higher Education Opportunity Program, a student must have been a New York State resident for 1 year, have a high school or equivalent state-approved diploma (such as the Armed Forces), be academically disadvantaged (meaning the student would not be admitted according to regular admission standards), be financially disadvantaged (based on income cutoffs, varying by college), and demonstrate ambition to succeed.

== Participating institutions ==
- Alfred University
- Bard College
- Barnard College
- Boricua College
- Canisius University
- Clarkson University
- University of Mount Saint Vincent
- Columbia University (Columbia College & School of Engineering and Applied Science)
- Cornell University
- Daemen University
- D'Youville University
- Five Towns College
- Fordham University
- Hamilton College
- Hilbert College
- Hobart and William Smith Colleges
- Ithaca College
- Keuka College
- Le Moyne College
- Marist University
- Marymount Manhattan College
- Mercy College
- Mount Saint Mary College
- Nazareth University
- The New School
- New York Institute of Technology (Manhattan Center)
- New York University
- Niagara University
- Paul Smith's College
- Pratt Institute
- Rochester Institute of Technology
- Russell Sage College
- Sage College of Albany
- St. Bonaventure University
- St. John Fisher University
- St. Lawrence University
- St. Thomas Aquinas College
- Siena College
- Skidmore College
- Syracuse University (including continuing education)
- Trocaire College
- Union College
- University of Rochester
- Utica University
- Vaughn College of Aeronautics and Technology
