= Mina P. Shaughnessy =

American teacher and innovator of basic writing (1924–1978)

Mina Shaughnessy (née Pendo; March 13, 1924 – November 16, 1978), was a teacher and innovator in the field of basic writing at the City University of New York (CUNY).

== Early life ==
Born in the mining town of Lead, South Dakota, Mina Pendo and her older brother George lived far more enriched academic lives as children than their father, Albert Pendo, a miner, who only attained an eighth grade education.

Mina's mother, Ruby Alma (Johnson) Pendo, had attained a far higher level of education, receiving both a high school diploma and a two-year teaching certificate. Ruby Johnson taught school for two years in Alaska before her family moved to South Dakota, whereupon she met and married Albert Pendo.

Shaughnessy found her passion for teaching Open Admissions students in part due to the experiences of her father, who was often labelled as unable to excel in reading and writing.

Also contributing to the academic atmosphere of the Pendo home were the boarders the family took on. Two teachers from the local elementary school lived with the family for years during Mina's childhood, Amelia Perman and Edith Johnson. Though technically tenants, the two were almost like aunts to the Shaughnessy children. Not only did Shaughnessy have these women to look to, but in her own extended family she had examples of women in academic success. Two of her real aunts were also school teachers in other parts of the country.

== Undergraduate education ==
Although the United States entered World War II just before Shaughnessy graduated high school, she was not deterred from further pursuing her academic work. Shaughnessy applied and was accepted to the School of Speech at Northwestern University in Evanston, Illinois.

Shaughnessy worked closely with Alvina Krause, an assistant professor at Northwestern at the time. She overcame her Midwestern accent and further developed the air of sophistication and confidence that was her trademark during her tutelage in the art and skill of public speaking (a knack that would serve her well later in her career) and acting. She worked in the Manhattan area while searching for parts in theater productions. One summer, Krause invited Mina to join her theater company that would travel to Eagles Mere, Pennsylvania. Shaughnessy joined the company, and after one performance was invited to audition for Eugene O’Neill’s A Moon for the Misbegotten in New York. She turned down the scout's offer, feeling it was more important that she return to Northwestern and complete her education. Shaughnessy graduated in 1946 with an undergraduate degree in speech.

== Graduate education ==
Much of Shaughnessy's education and work experience was vital to her future success with open admissions at City College of New York. When she graduated from Northwestern University in 1946, she and Priscilla Weaver Brandt headed for New York City to pursue their acting degrees. Shaughnessy soon realized a professional acting career was not in her future and decided to attend graduate school at Wheaton College in Wheaton, Illinois.

After a year of Bible studies at Wheaton, Shaughnessy returned to New York. Instead of focusing on an acting career, Shaughnessy enrolled in a master's program at Columbia University where her focus was Seventeenth-Century English Literature. After her graduation in 1951, she ruled out a PhD because of the sheer expense. Her lack of a PhD would haunt her consistently throughout her career.

After receiving her MA, Shaughnessy landed a position as a research assistant with Raymond Fosdick, a prominent attorney who handled much of the Rockefeller Foundation. From 1951 until 1955, Shaughnessy's assignment would be to assist in writing John D. Rockefeller Jr.'s biography. Though only Fosdick's name would appear on the eventual biography, Shaughnessy wrote half of the book. With this position, Shaughnessy would hone her research skills as well as rub shoulders with many famous individuals.

== Married life and early career ==
During this time, Mina met and married Donald Shaughnessy in September 1953. On their first date, they were excited to find out that they were both left handed and born on the same day. Although they were physically apart for much of their married life, their first few years were filled with excitement and mutual appreciation. A native New Yorker, he was familiar with city life, race, and politics. Much of this was transmitted to Shaughnessy, who would deal with New York City politics and different races with Open Admissions. With Don living abroad for multiple years at a time, Shaughnessy was able to plunge herself into her studies, teaching, and directing the writing program at City College.

As Shaughnessy and Raymond Fosdick were wrapping up the Rockefeller manuscript, Mina and Don were also preparing for a move to Italy, where Don had secured a position teaching history. In Italy, Fosdick's office had arranged a part-time job for Mina. Perhaps comparable to the student writing she would later defend, Shaughnessy, at this time, complains of the pastor's remedial writing skills: "I have this rewriting job. But what a pain. I try to devote most of my afternoon to it but it is so awful. An assistant pastor's recollections of his experiences at Riverside Church – badly written and permeated with that sort of limp and pallid good will which one associates with assistant ministers in Protestant churches.

== Transition into higher education ==
In 1956, Mina and Don returned from Italy. She applied for dozens of teaching positions at the collegiate level without success. Instead, she accepted a position at McGraw Hill as an editor. She would work at McGraw until 1961 and be responsible for editing major books and supervising other editors.

In 1961, Shaughnessy resigned from McGraw Hill and enlisted to teach night courses in composition and literature at Hunter College. She would teach these night classes at Hunter College for five years. In 1962, she assisted Raymond Fosdick again in researching educational trends and policies in the South. In 1964, she accepted a full-time position at Hofstra, where she would teach until 1967, a full-time day position in an English department. At Hofstra, she taught freshman composition, and advanced writing and grammar courses. During this time, she met many other faculty members who would support her in open admissions, such as Marilyn French and Alice Stewart Trillin. In 1967, she and Stewart Trillin were both offered positions to teach at City College of New York (CCNY) as part of the Pre-Baccalaureate Program, a program designed to increase the chances of higher education for those traditionally barred from entering colleges and universities due to grades or lack of money. The program offered counseling, stipends, and remedial classes to help these students gain the skills they would need to succeed in college. The Pre-Baccalaureate Program would be renamed SEEK (Search for Education, Elevation, and Knowledge) and continued to grow. As Shaughnessy was beginning to teach at City, Anthony Penale suffered a heart attack, and Shaughnessy was quickly recommended to replace him as the director of the program.

== Director of the SEEK Program at City College of New York ==
In 1967, Shaughnessy became the director of the SEEK (Search for Education, Elevation, and Knowledge) program at City College of New York. In the SEEK program, she established several priority goals to create an awareness of the program's importance and raise its status and the status of those that worked for it. She encountered much resistance to the SEEK program. Faculty across City College, especially within the English department, felt that by allowing these non-traditional students into the College, the standards of learning would be lowered and this would cause the downfall of higher education in America. Many of the teachers who worked for the SEEK program were accused of incompetence and being under qualified to teach at a higher institutions. The SEEK staff felt ostracized by the English department and were not given office space to help the students who most needed the help of professors.

One way Shaughnessy worked to elevate the status of the SEEK program was to treat basic writing as a field of academic scholarship. Her colleagues remember that she was the first one most of them had met that "was making a formal, scholarly inquiry into the teaching of 'basic' writing" (97). In order to do this she studied the theories and concepts of sociolinguistics, grammar, and sociology. She refused to lower the standards, but sought to create a pedagogy that would bring these disadvantaged students up to the standards (99). Several of the material results were the creation of a Writing Center, a summer language workshop, a curriculum and textbooks for teaching basic writing that required among other things weekly one-on-one teacher-student conferences, and the concept of writing across curriculum (138).

Shaughnessy's approach to teaching basic writing is outlined in the advice she gave to someone who was starting a basic writing program: 1) work harder than you have ever worked before, 2) develop a camaraderie among the teachers of basic writing, 3) recruit senior faculty, and 4) look like you are having fun (96). Mina was known to students, faculty, and friends as someone who continually carried exam blue books, went to work early and came home late. She worked to develop faculty camaraderie through holding frequent staff meetings where the teachers could become acquainted and share their experiences. She also felt that by having senior faculty in the basic writing program, they could lend not only their experience but also their influence and support to the program to elevate its status.

== Open Admissions ==
As City College began the Open Admissions program in 1970, the number of SEEK students requiring the services overseen by Shaughnessy grew to 3,500. In addition to running the rapidly expanding SEEK program, she also synthesized her vast research of her students’ writing to solidify her approach to basic writing.

== Carnegie Foundation grant and director of the writing program ==
In 1972-73 school year Shaughnessy was awarded a Carnegie Foundation grant to research and create "a report on the writing problems of disadvantaged students" (122). The duties of the directorship of the SEEK program went to another for a year as she did "more work," and worked "better and faster than most humans" (136). This sabbatical was eventually extended for another year. Throughout this time she continued meeting with the SEEK faculty and collaborating with them to put together a report of her findings. Her persistence and hard work paid off when she was promoted to Assistant Professor after much resistance, as well as praise and support, from other faculty. She became director of City College's Writing Program in 1973.

In her reports on her findings during this time, Shaughnessy worked hard against some stereotypes of basic writing students, revealing that low-income white students make up about two-thirds of the Open Admissions freshmen with below-80 high school averages. She placed much of the responsibility for this lack in skills and education of these basic writers on the teachers and school systems, emphasizing the need for the humility of teachers to learn from their students and create pedagogy that responds to their needs.

Shaughnessy also chaired many panels, conducted an Open Admissions seminar at the Conference on College Composition and Communication, and led many other activities to promote basic writing, including creating a bibliography of articles addressing basic writing.

Returning to teaching and continuing to work on a book she would later publish, Errors and Expectations, left her with little time to spend outside of the basic writing field. She did have some family concerns which needed her attention, however. Her father's arthritis worsened and her mother suffered several angina attacks and died in 1974. A close friend also died during this period.

== Director of Instructional Resource Center ==
Starting in 1975, she was appointed director of the Instructional Resource Center (IRC) and associate dean of City University of New York. The IRC collected and disseminated the research on basic education classes and the resources being used by the various CUNY divisions for these classes. The IRC also provided inservice training for writing teachers and created curriculum materials and placement tests. She was a founding editor of the Journal of Basic Writing (JBW), which supports multidisciplinary research on the study and teaching of underprepared writers. It continues to be published by the City University of New York twice per year.

In 1976, CUNY experienced severe budget cuts which caused them to let go of most of the staff that Shaughnessy had worked so closely and persistently with. These budget cuts also eliminated free tuition and raised the admissions standards, which changed the dynamics of those admitted to City College back to more traditional students. In March of this same year she agreed to publish her finished book Errors and Expectations with Oxford University Press. Errors and Expectations is the synthesis of the information she gleaned by carefully reading and studying 4,000 placement exams. In March 1977, two months after the release of Errors and Expectations, she was diagnosed with kidney cancer. Throughout her illness, during times when she was feeling better, she continued to plan teacher development courses, give lectures, and make plans for another book. Her fame continued to grow as Errors and Expectations became a very popular resource for composition teachers and programs. The cancer spread to her lungs and continued to other places in her body. Her friends remained with her and gave her what support they could during her illness. She died at home on November 16, 1978, aged 54.

== Errors and Expectations ==
Shaughnessy published a book titled Errors and Expectations: A Guide for the Teacher of Basic Writing with the Oxford University Press in 1977.

== Death ==
Her doctor diagnosed her with a stomach ulcer but soon found it to be kidney cancer. She struggled with her battle with cancer for two years and ultimately died on November 16, 1978.

== Legacy ==
The Mina P. Shaughnessy Prize is named in her memory and is awarded for an "outstanding scholarly book in the fields of language, culture, literacy, or literature with strong application to the teaching of English." Many current and important scholars of basic writing, including David Bartholomae and Patricia Bizzell, acknowledge Shaughnessy as a guiding influence on their work.

Shaughnessy is credited with the foundation of the basic writing movement. Using the skills and theory provided in Shaughnessy's Errors and Expectations, the movement has continued to exist in higher education today. The City University of New York still preserves Shaughnessy's legacy by continually writing articles in the Journal of Basic Writing, debating the impact of her beliefs.

Shaughnessy's overriding focus on eliminating error from the writing of students has also drawn its share of critics. In a 1979 essay on "The Politics of Composition", John Rouse fiercely attacked what he saw as her over-emphasis on mechanical skills and correctness. And in 1991, Min-Zhan Lu published a controversial article on "Redefining the Legacy of Mina Shaughnessy" in the Journal of Basic Writing, the research journal that Shaughnessy herself had helped start in 1975. Like Rouse, Lu criticized Shaughnessy's focus on the surface features rather than meaning of student writing. Both Rouse and Lu's articles sparked many responses, and the debate over how dominant a role that issues of correct usage should play in teaching basic writing continues to this day.

The Journal of Basic Writing was founded by Mina Shaughnessy in 1975. Shaughnessy also served as the first editor of the journal. With support from the Office of Academic Affairs of the City University of New York, the JBW is published twice a year.

== Bibliography of works by Mina Shaughnessy ==
Books
Errors and Expectations: A Guide for the Teacher of Basic Writing. Oxford University Press, 1979, ISBN 0-19-502507-5

Articles These are reprinted in the Maher biography cited below.
"Open Admissions and the Disadvantaged Teacher." College Composition and Communication. December 1973.
"Diving In: An Introduction to Basic Writing." College Composition and Communication. October 1976.
"The Miserable Truth." The Congressional Record. September 9, 1976.
"Speaking and Doublespeaking about Standards." Address delivered at the California State University and Colleges Conference. June 3, 1976.
"Statement on Criteria for Writing Proficiency." Journal of Basic Writing. Fall/Winter 1980.
"Some Needed Research on Writing." College Composition and Communication. December 1977.
"The English Professor's Malady." Journal of Basic Writing. Spring 1994.
"Basic Writing." Address delivered at the Modern Literature Conference. October 1977.
