= Calvin Trillin =

American humorist and novelist (born 1935)

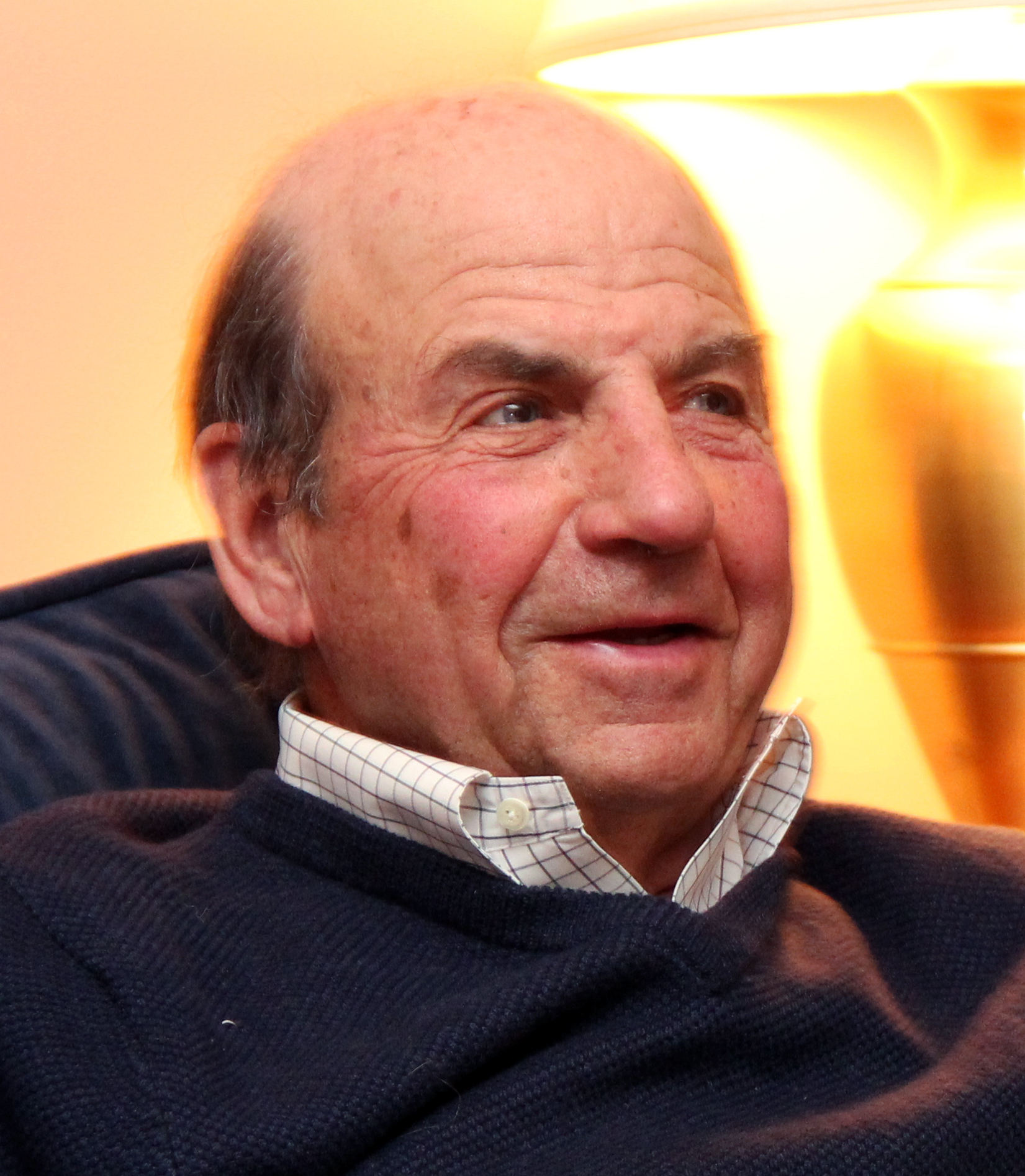
- Trillin in 2011
- Born: Calvin Marshall Trillin; December 5, 1935 (age 90); Kansas City, Missouri, U.S.
- Education: Yale University (BA)
- Spouse: Alice Stewart (m. 1965; died 2001)
- Children: 2
- Awards: 2013, Thurber Prize for American Humor

Calvin Marshall Trillin (born December 5, 1935) is an American journalist, humorist, food writer, poet, memoirist and novelist. He is a winner of the Thurber Prize for American Humor (2012) and an elected member of the American Academy of Arts and Letters (2008).

== Early life and education ==
Calvin Trillin was born in Kansas City, Missouri, in 1935 to Edythe and Abe Trillin. In his book Messages from My Father, he said his parents called him "Buddy". Raised Jewish, he attended public schools in Kansas City, graduated from Southwest High School, and went on to Yale University, where he was the roommate and friend of Peter M. Wolf (for whose 2013 memoir, My New Orleans, Gone Away, he wrote a humorous foreword), and where he served as chair of the Yale Daily News and was a member of the Pundits and Scroll and Key before graduating in 1957; he later served as a Fellow of the University.

== Career ==
After serving in the U.S. Army, Trillin worked as a reporter for Time magazine, then joined the staff of The New Yorker in 1963. He wrote the magazine's "U.S. Journal" series from 1967 to 1982, covering local events both serious and quirky throughout the United States. His reporting for the magazine on the racial integration of the University of Georgia was published in his first book, An Education in Georgia (1964).

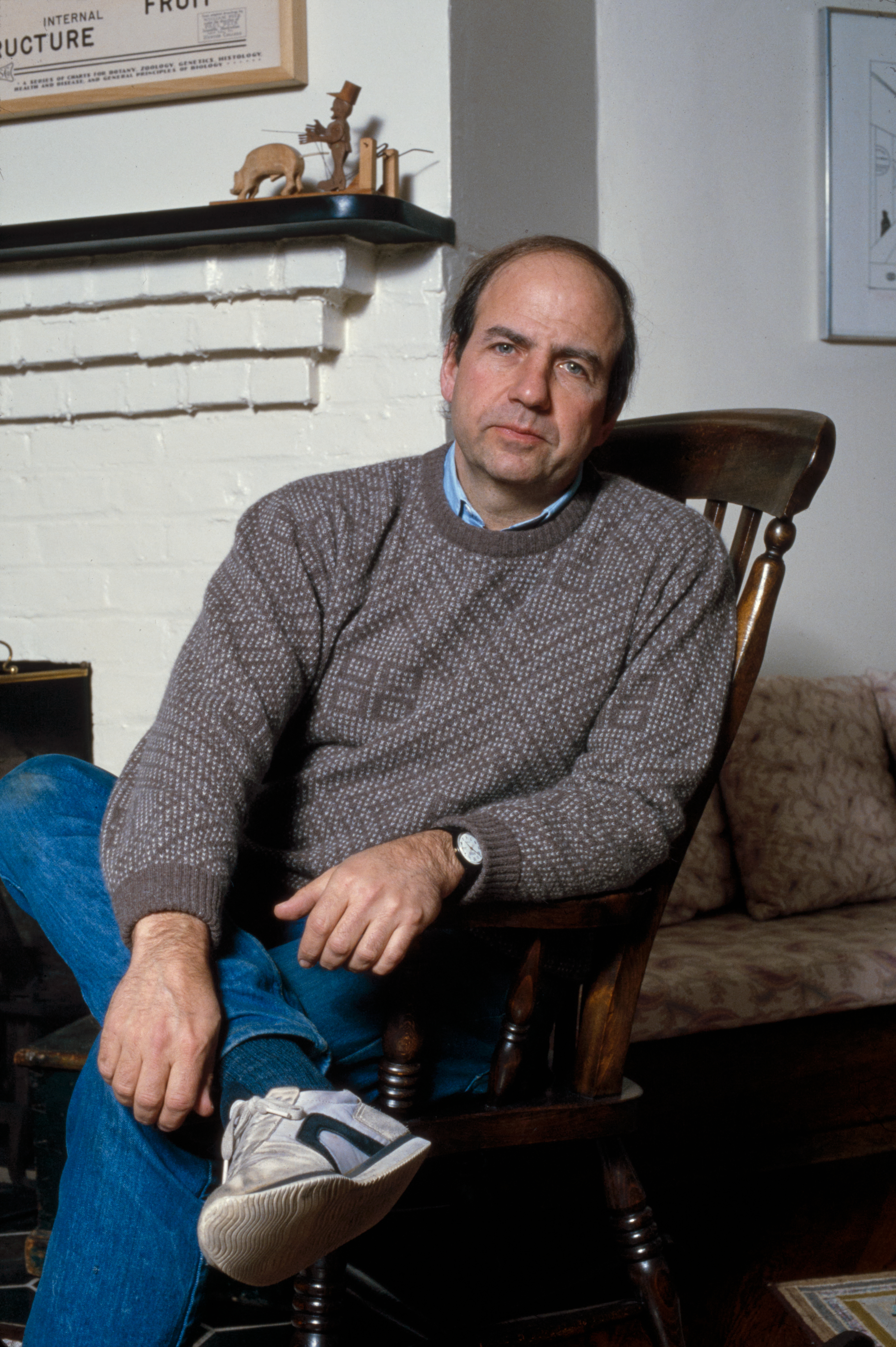
Trillin, photographed at home by Bernard Gotfryd in 1987

From 1975 to 1987, Trillin contributed articles to Moment, an independent magazine which focuses on the life of the American Jewish community.

Trillin also writes for The Nation. He began in 1978 with a column called "Variations", which was eventually renamed "Uncivil Liberties"; it ran through 1985. The same name was used for the column when it was syndicated weekly in newspapers, from 1986 to 1995, and essentially the same column ran (without a name) in Time from 1996 to 2001. His humor columns for The Nation during the 1980s and 1990s often made fun of then-editor Victor Navasky, whom he jokingly referred to as the wily and parsimonious Navasky. (He once wrote that the magazine paid "in the high two figures.") Since July 1990, Trillin has written humorous poems about current events as part of his weekly "Deadline Poet" column in The Nation.

Family, travel and food are major themes in Trillin's work. Three of his books on food — American Fried (1974), Alice, Let's Eat (1978) and Third Helpings (1983) — were collected in the 1994 compendium The Tummy Trilogy. Trillin has also written several autobiographical books and magazine articles, including Messages from My Father (1996), Family Man (1998), and an essay in the March 27, 2006 issue of The New Yorker, "Alice, Off the Page", discussing his late wife. In December 2006, a slightly expanded version of the essay was published as a book titled About Alice. In Messages from My Father, Trillin recounts how his father always expected his son to be a Jew, but had primarily "raised me to be an American".

Trillin has also written a collection of short stories, Barnett Frummer is an Unbloomed Flower (1969), and three comic novels, Runestruck (1977), Floater (1980), and Tepper Isn't Going Out (2002). The latter novel is about a man who enjoys parking in New York City for its own sake and is unusual among novels for exploring the subject of parking.

In 2008, Trillin was elected to the American Academy of Arts and Letters. The same year, The Library of America selected Trillin's essay "Stranger with a Camera" for inclusion in its two-century retrospective of American True Crime. In 2012, Trillin was awarded the Thurber Prize for American Humor for Quite Enough of Calvin Trillin: Forty Years of Funny Stuff, published by Random House. In 2013, he was inducted into the New York Writers Hall of Fame.

== Personal life ==
In 1965, Trillin married the educator and writer Alice Stewart Trillin, with whom he had two daughters. Alice died in 2001. He also has four grandchildren. Trillin lives in the Greenwich Village area of New York City.

Trillin was a close friend of Joan Didion and her husband John Gregory Dunne. He met Dunne when the two worked at Time in the 1960s. Dunne wrote an afterword to Trillin's 1993 book Remembering Denny and Trillin contributed a foreword to Dunne's posthumously released collection Regards (2005). In September 2022, Trillin was one of the speakers at Didion's memorial service in New York City.

== Bibliography ==
=== Non-fiction ===
- An Education in Georgia: Charlayne Hunter, Hamilton Holmes, and the Integration of the University of Georgia. New York: Viking. 1964. ISBN 978-082031887.
- U.S. Journal. New York: E.P. Dutton and Co. 1971. ISBN 978-0525226604.
- American Fried: Adventures of a Happy Eater. New York: Doubleday. 1974. ISBN 978-0385004404.
- Alice, Let's Eat: Further Adventures of a Happy Eater. New York: Random House. 1978. ISBN 978-0765198310.
- Uncivil Liberties. Boston: Ticknor and Fields. 1982. ISBN 978-0899190976.
- Third Helpings. Boston: Ticknor and Fields. 1983. ISBN 978-0899191737.
- Killings. Boston: Ticknor and Fields. 1984. ISBN 978-0399591402.
- With All Disrespect: More Uncivil Liberties. Boston: Ticknor and Fields. 1985. ISBN 978-0899193533.
- If You Can't Say Something Nice. Boston: Ticknor and Fields. 1987. ISBN 978-0899195315.
- Travels with Alice. Boston: Ticknor and Fields. 1989. ISBN 978-0899199108.
- Enough's Enough: And Other Rules of Life. Boston: Ticknor and Fields. 1990. ISBN 978-0899199580.
- American Stories. Boston: Ticknor and Fields. 1991. ISBN 978-0395593677.
- Remembering Denny. New York: Farrar, Straus and Giroux. 1993. ISBN 978-0374226077.
- Too Soon to Tell. New York: Farrar, Straus and Giroux. 1995. ISBN 978-0374278465.
- Messages from My Father: A Memoir. New York: Farrar, Straus and Giroux. 1996. ISBN 978-0374525088.
- Family Man. New York: Farrar, Straus and Giroux. 1998. ISBN 9780374525835.
- Feeding a Yen: Savoring Local Specialties, from Kansas City to Cuzco. New York: Random House. 2003. ISBN 978-0375508080.
- About Alice. New York: Random House. 2006. ISBN 978-1400066155.
- Trillin on Texas. Austin: University of Texas Press. 2011. ISBN 978-0292726505.
- Quite Enough of Calvin Trillin: Forty Years of Funny Stuff. New York: Random House. 2011. ISBN 978-1400069828.
- Jackson, 1964: And Other Dispatches from Fifty Years of Reporting on Race in America. New York: Random House. 2016. ISBN 978-0399588242.
- The Lede: Dispatches from a Life in the Press. New York: Random House. 2024. ISBN 978-0593596449.

=== Novels ===
- Runestruck. New York: Little, Brown and Company. 1977. ISBN 978-0316852753.
- Floater. Boston: Ticknor and Fields. 1980. ISBN 978-0899190174.
- Tepper Isn't Going Out. New York: Random House. 2002. ISBN 978-0375758515.

=== Short fiction ===
- Barnett Frummer is an Unbloomed Flower. New York: Viking. 1969. ISBN 978-0670148066.

=== Poetry ===
- Deadline Poet: My Life As a Doggerelist. New York: Farrar, Straus and Giroux. 1994. ISBN 978-0374135522.
- Obliviously On He Sails: The Bush Administration in Rhyme. New York: Random House. 2004. ISBN 978-1400062881.
- A Heckuva Job: More of the Bush Administration in Rhyme. New York: Random House. 2006. ISBN 978-1400065561.
- Deciding the Next Decider: The 2008 Presidential Race in Rhyme. New York: Random House. 2008. ISBN 978-1400068289.
- Dogfight: The 2012 Presidential Campaign in Verse. New York: Random House. 2012. ISBN 978-0812993684.
- No Fair! No Fair! And Other Jolly Poems of Childhood. New York: Orchard Books. 2016. ISBN 978-0545825788.
