= Open admissions =

College admissions policy in the United States

Open admissions, or open enrollment, is a type of unselective and noncompetitive college admissions process in the United States in which the only criterion for entrance is a high school diploma or a certificate of attendance or General Educational Development (GED) certificate.

== Definition ==
This form of "inclusive" admissions is used by many public junior colleges and community colleges and differs from the selective admission policies of most private liberal arts colleges and research universities in the United States, which often take into account standardized test scores as well as other academic and character-related criteria.

== History ==
The open admissions concept was heavily promoted in the 1960s and 1970s as a way to reduce discrimination in college admissions and to promote education of the underprivileged. The first major application in the United States was at the City University of New York (CUNY) following protests. CUNY later applied the policy only to its two-year community colleges, as they are better equipped for remedial education.

While the United States and other nations in the Anglosphere have historically tended toward a selective model for university admissions, mainland European nations have tended toward open admissions. Pressure for a more selective admissions model has only arisen in some of these countries as late as the 1970s, largely owing to the higher per capita rate of university participation in countries with selective admissions at that time.

== Controversy ==
In the late 1960s, CUNY's plans to introduce open admissions to its colleges by the fall of 1970 sparked controversy both in politics and academia. Critics of open admissions included Vice President Spiro Agnew and right-wing journalists Robert Novak and Irving Kristol, while its supporters included noted American writing scholar Mina P. Shaughnessy.

The case for open admissions cites the movement of the U.S. population from primarily rural to primarily urban, the shifting microeconomics in the country from primarily goods-oriented to primarily services-oriented, and the country's rapid diversification of racial, ethnic, and class identities. Other cases for open admissions focused on academia's role as a gatekeeper for privilege, characterizing open admissions as a driving force for upward social mobility for American families.

Opponents of open admissions raise concerns about credentialism and educational inflation, stating that opening colleges to any applicant could potentially devalue the college diploma as an asset. They characterized the move to open admissions not as a genuine attempt at educational reform but as a maneuver of racial politics and the gross politicization of the educational process. Other, less prevalent criticisms include the idea that, through open admissions, CUNY was, whether purposefully or not, depriving private colleges of students through the combination of open admissions and less expensive tuition.

A criticism of CUNY's particular open admissions model was that it would not effect sufficient change for the underprivileged. This was not an indictment of open admissions in itself but a prediction that open admissions might do nothing to an already present prestige gap between more selective and less selective schools.

== Graduation rates ==
The graduation rates of colleges are correlated with their admissions policies. Six years after beginning a four-year program, an average of 60% of students nationwide will have graduated. However, that rate varies from 89% at colleges that accept less than a quarter of applicants to less than 36% at those with an open admissions policy.

== See also ==
- Open university (concept)
- Open-door academic policy
- Cooling out
- University and college admission
