= Certificate of attendance =

Document proving the attendance of a class or course

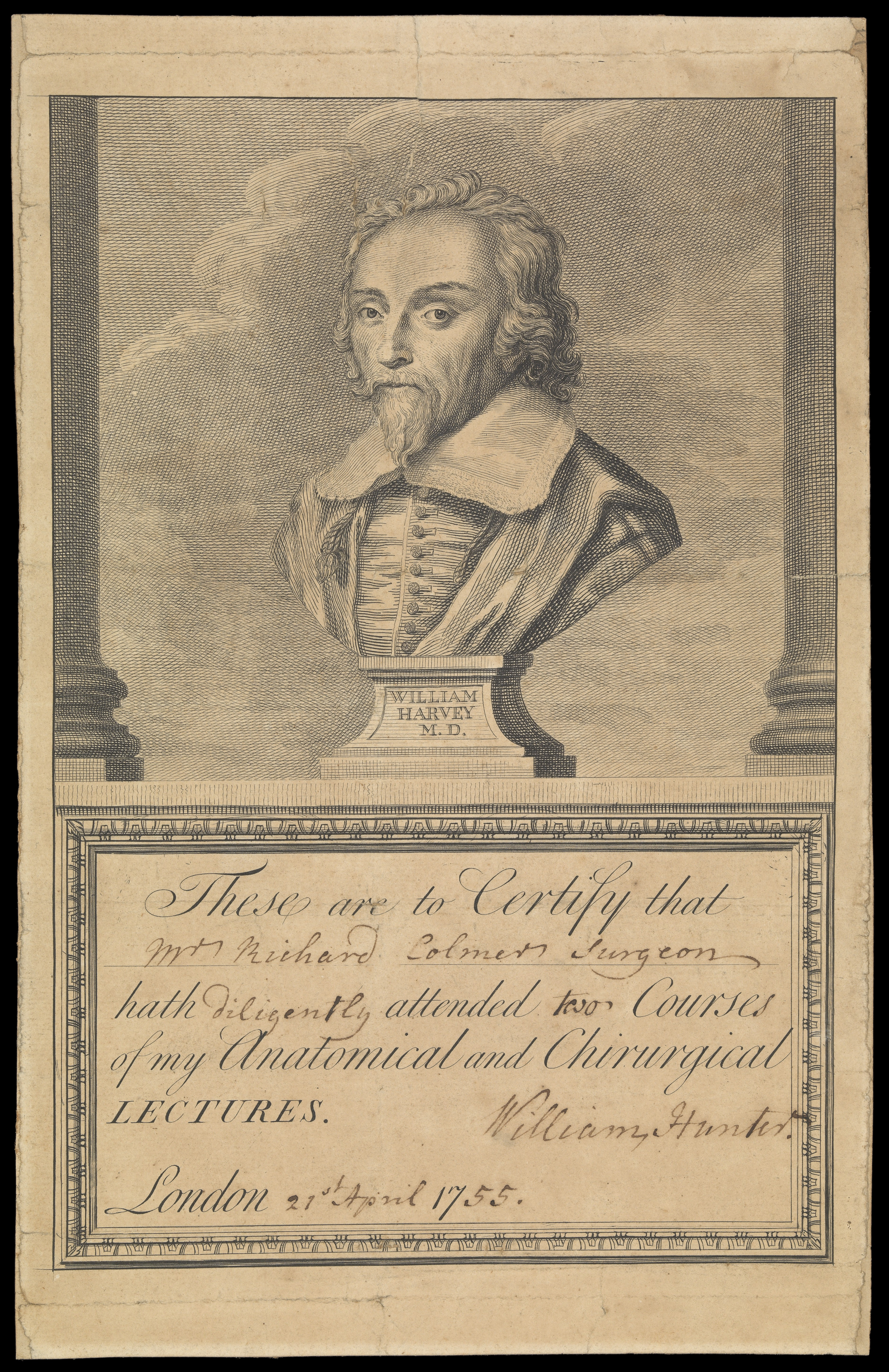
Certificate of attendance (in this case for Richard Colmer, surgeon) at anatomy and surgery courses run by William Hunter. The certificate is signed by him and dated 27 April 1755 by hand. The upper part of the certificate is an engraving of a bust of William Harvey.

A certificate of attendance (also certificate of participation) is an official document proving the attendance of a class, a language course or a training course.

Although it could increase the prospects of professional promotion, this type of certificate is not a credential because it does not provide proof of learning, that is, no knowledge is assessed before such a certificate is issued.

== United States and Canada ==
In the United States and Canada, a certificate of attendance is a certificate given to students who complete the K-12 (kindergarten through 12th grade) program but do not meet the requirements for the high school diploma or the modified diploma.

Students who complete 12th grade but did not obtain enough credits, did not complete all core courses, did not pass required testing or did not meet the goals outlined in their individualized program will still be acknowledged in the graduation ceremony; they will walk across the stage in cap and gown, and will look like a graduate. Instead of receiving a diploma, however, they will receive a certificate of attendance. Some students are encouraged to return to school for either a full year or more (and then to graduate whenever they finish) to make up their credits, pass required testing or meet their goals, and finally obtain a regular or modified diploma. Some alternative programs allow students to finish in half year provided that they meet certain requirements. Certificates of attendance are also given to students that participate in early college or other such programs, as the school will withhold a credit to keep them enrolled in highschool as they continue their college program.

Some schools do not allow these students to participate in the graduation ceremony. This is controversial as some students feel that the social benefits of graduation are important.

=== Certification of completion ===
Upon completion of a college, university, or vocational school certificate program, students generally receive a certification of completion or certificate of achievement, not a degree or diploma. Candidates who are enrolled in an institution as full or part-time students may be able to transfer these certificates to degree programs at other institutions.

In certain jurisdictions, students with disabilities who complete the required Individualized Education Program but do not meet the requirements of the high school diploma who complete 12th grade may also be awarded a certificate of completion.

== Bibliography ==
- Jacob, Brian A.; "Getting Tough? The Impact of High School Graduation Exams"; Educational Evaluation and Policy Analysis; v. 23, n. 2, pp. 99–121 (Summer 2001)
- Cameron, S. V. & Heckman, J. J., "The Nonequivalence of High School Equivalents"; Journal of Labor Economics; v. 11, n. 1, pt. 1, p. 1-? (1993)
