= List of magicians =

This is a list of magicians/illusionists, prestidigitators, mentalists, escapologists, and other practitioners of stage magic. For the list of supernatural magicians, see List of occultists.

Magicians are listed by the most common name used in performance. Magicians' actual names, when applicable, follow in parentheses.

== A ==
- Simo Aalto
- David Abbot
- David Acer
- Curtis Adams
- Jewel Aich
- C. A. Alexander (Claude Alexander Conlin)
- Jason Alexander
- Jay Alexander
- Amazing Johnathan (John Edward Szeles)
- Michael Ammar
- Ivan Amodei
- Fergus Anckorn ("Wizardus")
- Harry Anderson
- John Henry Anderson
- Jerry Andrus
- Tony Andruzzi (Tom S. Palmer)
- Criss Angel (Christopher Sarantakos)
- Theodore Annemann (Theodore John Squires)
- John Archer
- Simon Aronson
- Alexis Arts
- Jeffery Atkins

== B ==
- Al Baker
- Ed Balducci
- Samri Baldwin
- Carl Ballantine (Meyer Kessler)
- David Tobias Bamberg II (Fu Manchu)
- Tobias Bamberg
- Banachek (Steven Shaw)
- Wes Barker
- Barry and Stuart (Barry Jones & Stuart MacLeod)
- Keith Barry
- János Bartl
- Guy Bavli
- Steve Beam
- Herbert L. Becker
- David Ben
- David Berglas
- Charles Bertram
- Frank K. Berry
- Arnold de Biere
- Ariann Black
- Gay Blackstone
- Harry Blackstone, Sr.
- Harry Blackstone, Jr.
- David Blaine
- J.B. Bobo
- Ali Bongo (William Oliver Wallace)
- John Born
- Zdeněk Bradáč
- L. H. Branson
- Marshall Brodien
- Dick Brooks also known as Dick Brookz, Bravo the Great or Grate, and Ray Carter (John Bravo)
- Derren Brown
- James Brown
- Brian Brushwood
- Matthias Buchinger
- Eugene Burger
- Lance Burton
- H. J. Burlingame
- John Bundy
- Kuda Bux (Khuda Bakhsh)

== C ==
- Alessandro Cagliostro
- John Calvert (Elbern Madren Calvert)
- Charles Cameron
- Canuplin (Canuto Francia)
- Charlie Caper
- Michael Carbonaro
- Cardini (Richard Valentine Pitchford)
- Dean Carnegie
- John Carney
- Charles Joseph Carter
- John Cassidy
- Mike Caveney
- Juliana Chen
- Shamsudheen Cherpulassery
- Hanson Chien
- Milbourne Christopher
- Rudy Coby
- Al Cohen
- Steve Cohen
- Aldo Colombini
- Louis Comte
- Comus (Nicolas-Philippe Ledru)
- Ali Cook
- Tommy Cooper
- David Copperfield (David Seth Kotkin)
- Tony Corinda (Thomas William Simpson)
- Paul Cosentino
- Chris Cox
- Aleister Crowley (Edward Alexander Crowley)
- Fred Culpitt
- Doc Cunningham
- Paul Curry

== D ==
- Paul Daniels (Newton Edward Daniels)
- Dante the Magician (Harry August Jansen)
- Daryl (Daryl Easton, Daryl Martinez)
- Lewis Davenport (George Ryan)
- William Henry and Ira Erastus Davenport
- Dedi
- Clémentine de Vère
- Buatier De Kolta
- David Devant (David Wellington or David Wighton)
- Persi Diaconis
- Dorothy Dietrich
- Sterling Dietz
- Dean Dill
- Derek Dingle
- Dinardi (Alfred Körber)
- Jon Dorenbos
- Thomas Nelson Downs
- Simon Drake (Simon Alexander)
- Paul W. Draper
- Joseph Dunninger
- Geoffrey Durham
- Dynamo (Steven Frayne)
- Disguido (Duet formed by Guido Marini and Isabella Raponi Zanivan)

== E ==
- Doc Eason
- Frank Eugene Eliason
- Oscar Eliason
- Tim Ellis
- Alex Elmsley
- S. W. Erdnase
- Sermet Erkin
- Henry R. Evans
- Sophie Evans
- Terry Evanswood

== F ==
- Fakir of Ava (Isaiah Harris Hughes)
- Christian Farla
- Shawn Farquhar
- Rich Ferguson (Richard Jeffrey Evans)
- Norbert Ferré
- Michael Finney
- Jon Finch
- Pete Firman
- Fischbacher, Siegfried, see Siegfried & Roy
- Dariel Fitzkee (Dariel Fitzroy)
- Justin Flom
- Al Flosso (Albert Levinson)
- Ching Ling Foo (Chee Ling Qua)
- Imro Fox (Isidore Fuchs)
- Mat Franco
- James Freedman
- Winston Freer
- Greg Frewin
- Dan Frischman

== G ==
- Helder Guimaraes
- Lewis Ganson
- Frank Garcia
- Martin Gardner
- Gazzo (Gary Osbourne)
- Uri Geller
- Karl Germain
- Paul Gertner
- Walter B. Gibson
- Roberto Giobbi
- Andi Gladwin
- Lennart Green
- Haim Goldenberg
- Horace Goldin
- Will Goldston
- Gopinath Muthukad
- Hendra Gunawan

== H ==
- Br. John Hamman
- Virginia Edmunda Hammer
- Franz Harary
- Robert Harbin (born Edward Williams)
- Hardeen (Ferencz Dezso Weisz)
- Neil Patrick Harris
- Paul Harris
- Ben Hart
- Murray and Teresa Hatfield
- Whit "Pop" Haydn
- Royal Vale Heath
- Carisa Hendrix (Lucy Darling)
- Doug Henning
- Alexander Herrmann
- John Northern Hilliard
- Harry Houdini (Erik Weiss)
- Jean Hugard
- Han Ping Chien
- Timothy Hyde

== I ==
- Scott Interrante
- Ertuğrul Işınbark

== J ==
- Kevin James
- P. James (V. Kennedy)
- Emil Jarrow
- Joshua Jay
- Ricky Jay (Ricky Potash)
- Jay & Joss (Jamie Docherty and Lewis Joss)
- Larry Jennings
- Luke Jermay
- John George
- Penn Jillette, see also Penn & Teller
- Kristen Johnson
- The Amazing Jonathan (John Edward Szeles)
- Barry Jones
- Richard Jones
- Charles Jordan

== K ==
- Peter Kane
- Fred Kaps (Abraham Pieter Adrianus Bongers)
- Gustavus Katterfelto
- Richard J. Kaufman
- Harry Kellar (Heinrich Keller)
- Michael Kent
- Daniel Ketchedjian
- Paul Kieve
- Mac King
- Emil Kio (Emil Teodorovich Girshfeld-Renard)
- Igor Kio (Igor Emilievich Renard Kio)
- Hans Klok
- Eric Knauss (The Great Zucchini)
- André Kole (Robert Gurtler, Jr.)
- Buatier De Kolta (Joseph Bautier)
- Al Koran (Edward Doe)
- Milton Kort
- Justin Kredible (Justin Willman)
- The Amazing Kreskin (George Joseph Kresge, Jr.)
- David Kwong

== L ==
- Joe Labero (Lars Bengt Roland Johansson)
- Duane Laflin
- Rob Lake
- Lou Lancaster (Louis Lancaster McClung)
- Micah Lasher
- Jason Latimer
- René Lavand
- Misty Lee
- Debbie Leifer
- Tina Lenert
- Minnette Gersh Lenier
- Servais Le Roy
- Eliphas Levi (Alphonse Louis Constant)
- Shlomo Levinger
- Jonathan Levit
- Shin Lim
- Harry Lorayne
- Curtis II Lovell
- Simon Lovell
- John Lovick
- Tom London
- K Lal (Kantilal Girdharilal Vora)
- Chen Lu

== M ==
- John MacGregor
- Stuart Macleod
- Magic Babe Ning (Ning Cai)
- Mahdi Moudini
- Magic Christian (Christian Stelzel)
- Gérard Majax (Gérard Fater)
- Max Malini (Max Katz Breit)
- Bill Malone
- Leon Mandrake (Leon Giglio)
- Matt Marcy
- Ed Marlo (Edward Malkowski)
- Jay Marshall (James Ward Marshall)
- Peter Marvey
- Jasper Maskelyne
- John Nevil Maskelyne
- Nevil Maskelyne
- Masklyn ye Mage: see Tony Andruzzi
- Luis de Matos
- Matt the Knife
- Max Maven (Phil Goldstein)
- Andrew Mayne (Andrew Harter)
- Jeff McBride
- Billy McComb
- Doug McKenzie
- Georges Méliès (Marie-Georges-Jean Méliès)
- Lisa Menna
- John Milner
- David Minkin
- Drummond Money-Coutts
- Morgan The Escapist
- Harry Moulding
- Stephen Mulhern
- John Mulholland
- Tom Mullica
- Oscar Munoz
- Gopinath Muthukad

== N ==
- Vazhakkunnam Namboothiri
- Natias Neutert
- Chris Nicholson
- David Nixon
- Alain Nu
- Andy Nyman

== O ==
- Shoot Ogawa
- Okito (Tobias Bamberg)
- Danny Orleans
- Darwin Ortiz
- Richard Osterlind
- Great Ovette (Joseph Ovette)
- İlkay Özdemir
- O.P. Sharma

== P ==
- Pat Page
- Eusapia Palladino (Minerverno Murge)
- Johnny "Ace" Palmer
- Alex Paterson
- Oz Pearlman
- Pendragons (Jonathan and Charlotte Pendragon)
- David Penn
- Penn & Teller (see also Penn Jillette and Teller)
- Scott Penrose
- Jacob Philadelphia (Jacob Meyer)
- Piff the Magic Dragon (John van der Put)
- Joseph Pinetti (Joseph Pinetti Willedall de Merci)
- Franz Polgar
- Channing Pollock
- Richard Potter
- Fay Presto (Letitia Winter, Oliver Winter)
- P. C. Sorcar Sr. (Indian magician, 1950s)
- P. C. Sorcar Jr. and P. C. Sorcar, Young (Indian Magicians)

== Q ==
- Noel Qualter

== R ==
- James Randi (Randall James Hamilton Zwinge)
- Peter Reveen
- Charles Reynolds
- Étienne-Gaspard Robert
- Jean Eugène Robert-Houdin
- William Ellsworth Robinson, performing as Chung Ling Soo
- Brian Role
- Romany, the Diva of Magic
- David Roth
- Rovi (Ivor Parry)
- Ian Rowland

== S ==
- Jerry Sadowitz
- Dale Salwak
- Long Tack Sam (Lung Te Shan)
- Jay Sankey
- Ian Saville
- Melinda Saxe
- Murray SawChuck
- John Scarne (Orlando Carmelo Scarnecchia)
- George Schindler
- Pauline Schmidt
- Howie Schwarzman
- Scott & Muriel (Scott Nelson and Muriel Brugman)
- Baron Hartwig Seeman
- P. T. Selbit (Percy Thomas Tibbles)
- Mark Setteducati
- Alan Shaxon (Alan Arthur Howson)
- Jeff Sheridan
- Tenkatsu Shokyokusai (Madame Tenkatsu)
- Siegfried & Roy (Siegfried Fischbacher and Roy Horn)
- Rocco Silano
- Silvan (Aldo Savoldello)
- Aaron Smith
- Tony Slydini (Quintino Marucci)
- Felix Snipes
- Thomas Solomon
- Chung Ling Soo (William Ellsworth Robinson)
- P. C. Sorcar (Protul Chandra Sarcar)
- P. C. Jr. Sorcar (Prodip Chandra Sarcar)
- Jim Steinmeyer
- David Stone
- Tom Stone (Thomas Bengtsson)
- Morgan Strebler (Matthew Glenn Milligan)
- J C Sum (Sum Jan-chung)
- Suhani Shah (India)
- Zati Sungur
- Jamy Ian Swiss
- Sylvester the Jester (Daniel Sylvester Battagline)

== T ==
- Cyril Takayama
- Mercedes Talma (Mary Ann Ford)
- Juan Tamariz (Tamariz-Martel Negrón)
- Harlan Tarbell
- Dustin Tavella
- Johnny Thompson (The Great Tomsoni)
- Teller (Raymond Joseph Teller): see also Penn & Teller
- Marco Tempest
- Princess Tenko (Mariko Itakura)
- Howard Thurston
- Neil Tobin
- Joe M. Turner
- Richard Turner

== V ==
- Val Valentino (The Masked Magician)
- Andrew Van Buren
- Dai Vernon (David Frederick Wingfield Verner)
- Michael Vincent (Michael Vincent Louis)

== W ==
- Val Walker
- Roy Walton
- Alan Watson
- Matt Wayne (Matthew Wayne Tomasko)
- Michael Weber (magician)
- Sue-Anne Webster
- Orson Welles
- Frances Willard
- Dick Williams
- Gregory Wilson
- Mark Wilson
- Tommy Wind
- Wittus Witt
- Tommy Wonder (Jacobus Maria Bemelman)
- Dominic Wood
- Greg Wood
- Steve Wyrick

== Z ==
- Rob Zabrecky
- Anton Zamloch
- The Zancigs
- Herb Zarrow
- Paul Zenon
- Florian Zimmer

== See also ==
- List of magicians in film
