= Don Wayne =

American designer and consultant

- Born: May 30, 1933
- Died: July 19, 2019 (aged 86)

Don Wayne (May 30, 1933 – July 19, 2019) was an American designer and consultant who has developed illusions for some of the world's most famous magicians. He also created and marketed smaller illusions used by many professional performers. He was the owner of the company Don Wayne Magic Inc., which did work for television, theater, theme parks and concert touring productions.

Wayne was named by MAGIC Magazine as one of the "most influential people in magic in the past 100 years". He has received a multitude of industry and peer awards, including The Academy of Magical Arts "Creative Fellowship", International Magicians Society "Magic Illusion Designer and Inventor of the Decade", and an Emmy Award for "Outstanding Special Visual Effects".

== Famous clients ==
Don Wayne was David Copperfield's principal magic creator and illusion director for over 18 years, which included 17 television specials and over 800 weeks of international touring.

In conjunction with Jim Steinmeyer he developed a vanishing jet plane illusion performed by Mark Kalin and Jinger at the Reno Hilton in February 2001, which was described at the time as the largest stage illusion in the world. Wayne’s other clients have included Michael Jackson, Britney Spears, Cher, Siegfried & Roy, Andre Kole, Criss Angel, Mark Wilson, Curtis Adams, Hans Klok, Dirk Arthur, Rick Thomas, Melinda Saxe, Steve Wyrick, Murray SawChuck, Luis de Matos, Jason Byrne, Florian Zimmer and Robert Gallup.
