= Hanson Chien =

Taiwanese magician

Hanson Chien 簡子
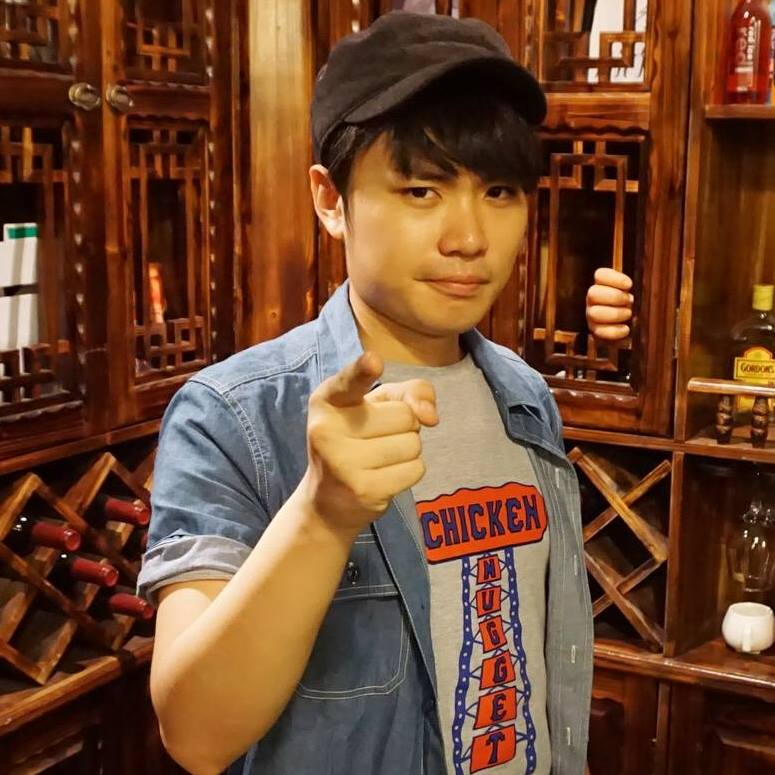
- Born: May 29, 1991 (age 34); Taiwan
- Occupation: Magician
- Website: Hanson Chien

Hanson Chien (Chinese: 簡子; pinyin: Jǐan Zi; born May 29, 1991) is a Taiwanese magician.

== Awards and accomplishments ==
- In 2023, he became the first Taiwanese to be featured on the cover of Magicseen. He was also awarded the Merlin Award by the International Magicians Society in the same year, the second Taiwanese magician to gain the award after Lu Chen.
