= Milton Kort =

American pharmacist and magician

- Born: Milton Kort; 1917; Michigan, U.S.
- Died: August 1, 2003 (aged 85–86)
- Occupations: pharmacist, micromagician
- Known for: sleight of hand, card magic
- Spouse: Reva Chaflin

Milton Kort (1917 – August 1, 2003) was an American professional pharmacist who dabbled in sleight of hand.

He was a hobbyist magician who seldom traveled outside the Detroit area and rarely performed. Professional magicians like Paul Rosini, Stewart James, Dr. Jacob Daley, J. B. Bobo, Charlie Miller, Cardini, Dai Vernon and more, sought out Milt Kort and shared secrets with him.

As a teenager in the 1930s, he worked as a demonstrator at Sterling Magic, owned by Harold Sterling. He became regarded as a fine amateur magician and thinker.

As a young man, he enlisted in the Army during World War II and became a supply sergeant. Eventually, he became a full-time pharmacist, opening his own store — Kort's Drugs.

Kort was good friends with coin magician J.B. Bobo, and contributed a majority of the work in BOBO's Coin Magic. A man like Milt Kort could fool and entertain an audience in even the most casual and intimate of settings. Milton Kort attended the local chapter of the International Brotherhood of Magicians Ring #22 in the Detroit, Michigan metropolitan area.

Kort had one simple rule, Kort's First Principle: Have Fun!

== Published works ==
- Kort is Now in Session
- Off-color Card Tricks
- Kortially Yours
- Kort, The Magic of Milt Kort by Stephen Minch, 1999, Hermetic Press. ISBN 978-0945296287

== See also ==
- List of magicians
- Card magic
