= Brian Rolè =

Maltese magician and illusionist

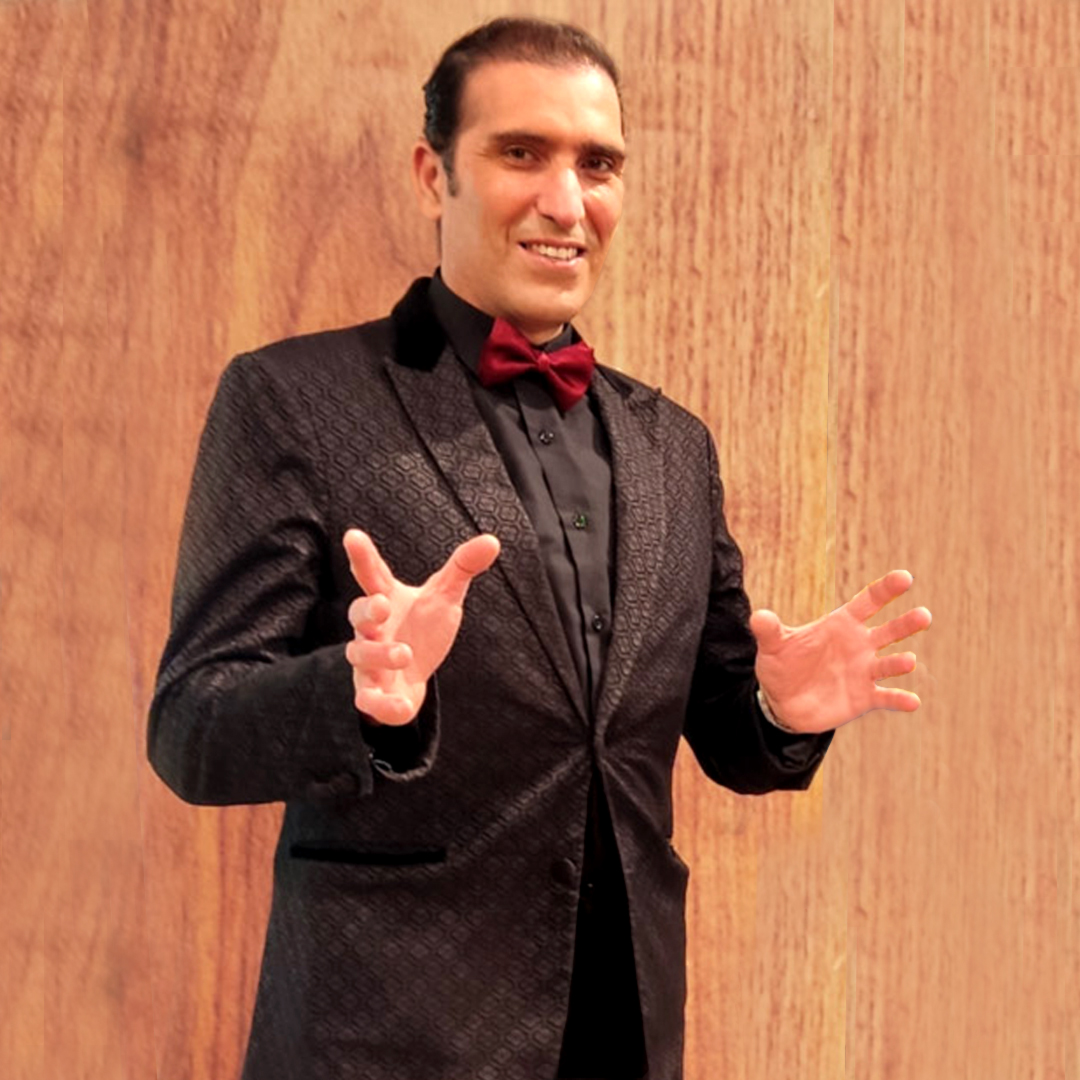
Brian Role`

Brian Rolè is an active international Maltese magician and illusionist. He was born on Malta's sister island Gozo in 1972 and became a full-time professional magician in 2000. Currently Brian is one of the most popular magicians in Malta due to his regular grand scale illusion shows and various television appearances. Usually he performs with his partner Lola Palmer (Lourdes C. Palmer) under the stage name The Palmers. He is a full member of The Magic Circle and the International Brotherhood of Magicians as well as the Malta Magician's Society IBM Ring 202 the International Society of Magicians and most recently in 2020 the Society of American Magicians.

Between 2004 and 2005 he was elected President of Malta's IBM Ring, Ring 202 which is affiliated with the International Brotherhood of Magicians' Ring 202 in Malta for one year, having previously served for three years as the Ring's secretary. Between 2009 and 2010 he served as the Vice President and secretary of Ring 202 Malta.

== Awards ==
Brain Rolè came first in a Parlor magic Competition in 2002, was runner up in the Close-up Magic Competition in 2004 and was the second runner up during a Children's Magic competition in 2006. In 2017 Brian Role and Lola Palmer were honoured with the most prestigious award in Magic, the I.M.S. Merlin Award. They were presented the award by President and Chairman of the International Magician's Society, Mr Tony Hassini, who flew in from New York to Malta to present the award to Brian & Lola during the presentation event held exclusively at Casino Malta where Brian & Lola give regular performances In December 2021 Brian Role` was honoured with the Darkstone Award from the President of the International Assembly of the Society of American Magicians, Anthony Darkstone, for his 'Outstanding Contributions To The Art Of Magic'.

== Performances ==
Brian performed extensively across the world, from South America to Asia, as well as several countries in Europe and at the Emirates Towers in Dubai. He performed in various hotels and resorts, dinner theatres shows including Es Foguero as well as on cruise ships including the Grand Voyager . In 2000, he became the first illusionist to perform at the ruins of the Royal Opera House in Valletta, more than 50 years after its destruction. Another first in Malta was when Brian launched 3D Mania - Encounter in the Third Dimension, in front of a theatre-full of Sunday Times competition winners at the IMAX Vodafone Theatre at the Eden Century Cinemas in St Julian's in 2002. Together with his partner Lola Palmer, Brian Role' performed for three consecutive years during the much acclaimed Notte Bianca Lejl Mdawwal events held in Malta during the month of October, the first time in 2007 the second in 2008 and the latest being that of 2009 On the eve of Halloween, 31 October 2009, Brian together with Lola and in collaboration with Vanni Pule' gave a most impressive full scale Halloween themed illusion show at Malta's national theatre, the Manoel Theatre in Valletta. On the 2 and 3 October 2010, Brian Role' together with his partner Lourdes C. Palmer, provided their first full scale illusion show called 'Magic In Cartoonland' which was produced by Bleep Entertainment Services and Teatru Manoel. In 2011, Brian Role' and Lola C Palmer put together and directed yet another show at the Manoel Theater, this time named 'The Magical Variety'. 'The Magical Variety' which was produced by BLEEP Entertainment and Teatru Manoel contained various performances by various local members of I.B.M. Ring 202. The show was well received by the public. In 2011, Brian Role' and Lourdes C. Palmer started their own dinner theater show called 'Chamber of Mysteries', which is set in a secret theater at Razzett L-Antik in Qormi. The show contains illusion, close up magic and mind reading and has been labeled as the 'Most Amazing Night In Malta' and has gained a good reputation among tourists visiting the island of Malta thus earning TripAdvisor's Certificate of Excellence award each year since 2011, the I.M.S. Merlin Award in 2017 and a Traveler's Choice award in 2020. In 2013, Brian and his partner Lola Palmer performed in China for the International Magic Festival, which was held in many cities across China, together with other famous magicians, including Jeff Mc bride, Levent, Rocco Silano, Val Valentino, Sylvester the Jester and many others from all over the world. Other participants from previous years include names such as Franz Harrary, Louis Dematos, Peter Marvey and other famous names in magic. In China they performed 28 stage shows for thousands of people who attended this prestigious magic festival,

== On television ==
Brian Rolè performed on various Maltese television shows, namely Tlaqna (in which he performed street magic) and Raxx (in which he performed grand illusions), both of which aired on Malta's national TV station TVM (Malta). Apart from that he also appeared on television shows, such as Showtime Ma Aceline, Is-Sibt, Hello Ray amongst others as a special guest. Between 2007 and 2008 Brian appeared over 25 times as the resident magician during the live televised show, Showtime Stairway To Success on the Maltese TV station ONE TV and between 2008 and 2009 again on Malta's national television station TVM during the Eurovision based program, Euro Showbox and during J Anvil's very popular TV show Saturday Night on Favourite Channel. In 2010 he has made several guest appearances on Net TV during a popular program for teens called 'GEKO' where he can be seen performing street magic, on 'Sessi' which is shown on Education 22 and has been appearing in a couple of TV adverts that are shown on many stations in Malta. In 2011 Brian Role' began appearing regularly on a Saturday afternoon program named 'Sas-Sitta' on NET TV which is currently still being broadcast. On International Television, Brian appeared on The Cruise and Travel Channel where he was featured by Debbie Jones on 'Cruising with the Stars'. He continues to perform on television on a regular basis.

== Recently ==
Most recently Brian Role` performed mainly during live Zoom shows during the multiple lockdowns due to Covid-19, giving live and televised performances where regulations permitted. In December 2021 he received The Darkstone Award for his 'Contributions to The Art of Magic', by the President of the International Assembly of the Society of American Magicians (S.A.M), Anthony Darkstone.

== See also ==
- List of magicians
