= Fitzkee =

Fitzkee is a surname. Notable people with the name include:

- Dariel Fitzkee (1898–1977), American magician and writer
- Scott Fitzkee (born 1957), American football player

== See also ==
- Paul Fitzke (1900–1950), American football and baseball player, football coach
