= Curtis Adams =

Curtis Adams may refer to:

- Curtis Adams (magician) (born 1982), American magician
- Curtis Adams (American football) (born 1962), former American football player

== See also ==
- Kurt Adams (disambiguation)
