= Andruzzi =

Andruzzi is a surname. Notable people with the surname include:

- Joe Andruzzi (born 1975), American football player
- Tony Andruzzi (1925–1991), American musician
