= Interrante =

Interrante is a surname. Notable people with the surname include:

- Daniele Interrante (born 1980), Italian television personality
- Scott Interrante (born 1961), American magician
- Victoria Interrante (fl. 1984), American computer scientist
