= Liu Qian =

Liu Qian is the name of:

- Liu Zhiqian (died 894), Tang dynasty general and governor, more commonly known as Liu Qian (劉謙) in historical sources
- Liu Qian (Investiture of the Gods) (劉乾), a fictional character from the 16th-century Chinese novel Investiture of the Gods

== See also ==
- Lu Chen (magician) (劉謙; born 1976), Taiwanese magician
- Qian Liu (錢鏐; 852–932), Tang dynasty warlord and first king of Wuyue
