= Han Ping Chien =

Chinese magician

- Born: Han Ping Chien; 1891; China
- Died: 1930 (aged 38–39)
- Occupation: magician
- Known for: sleight of Hand, coin magic

Han Ping Chien (1891–1930) was a Chinese magician, whose popularity peaked during the later part of America's vaudeville era (circa 1909) with his Peking Mysteries Troupe.

Unlike the many Oriental conjurers who were really of European or American heritage, Han Ping Chien was indeed a Chinese magician, whose popularity was recognized during the later part of America's vaudeville era.

It is believed that Han Ping Chien first began to perform magic as a child while in his native China. His act consisted of "The Rice Box", "Multiple Silk Productions", "Appearing Chinese Parasols" and the popular "Production of Water Bowls". Han Ping Chien caused not just one bowl of water to appear, but several tall stacks of bowls.

Following the early successes of Ching Ling Foo, Chung Ling Soo, and others who toured the world with an Oriental theme to their magic, Han Ping Chien left Asia and set out for Europe and the United States. With a traveling troupe many believed were made up of only family members, he presented his lavishly decorated Oriental act, always dressed in his native Chinese attire.

He is also credited with inventing the Han Ping Chien coin magic move.

== See also ==
- List of magicians
