= İlkay Özdemir =

Turkish stage magician (born 1981)

- Born: 1981 (age 43–44); Amasya, Turkey
- Occupation: Stage magician

İlkay Özdemir (born 1981) is a Turkish stage magician.

== Early years ==
In 2001, during her study of Economics at the university, she jobbed for psychiatrist Dr. Selim Başarır. Her employer, an experienced amateur magician, inspired her in stage magic. She amazed her friends with card tricks she learned from Başarır. She improved her repertoire of card tricks with more tricks her mentor taught her. Some time later, he encouraged her to participate at international competitions. She won first place in the card tricks category. In 2009, Selim Başarır would be honored with the Merlin Award of Best Magic Mentor.

Although she achieved success in many magic competitions, she hesitated to pursue a professional magician career because she felt she drew insufficient attention in public. However, she abandoned the idea to pursue her mother's profession in public relations, and decided to devote herself wholly to stage magic.

== Career ==
İlkay Özdemir began her professional career in 2004. She took part in the Sinan Çetin's television show with magician Uri Geller. She regrets her participation because the illusion show of spoon bending by Uri Geller turned into a supposed psychic effect.

She won the first prize at the 2004 Sofia magic competition with the trick "Flames and Birds", which brought her the 2011 Merlin Award in the category "Best Female Magician of the Year", a prize given to a woman in the USA and Asia only.

During a ceremony at the Turkish Patent Institute in November 2006, she amazed then Prime Minister Recep Tayyip Erdoğan with her magic performance of cards, banknotes and doves.

In December 2013, she performed an underwater escape show, in which she freed her chained hands and feet, and escaped in one minute and three seconds from a cage in a huge tank full of sharks at Istanbul Aquarium. The show was held in order to draw public attention to the endangered fish stock through pollution in the Marmara Sea.

İlkay Özdemir is Turkey's first and only female illusionist. Özdemir is considered the best performer of card tricks in Turkey.

She used to perform magic shows every two weeks in a bar in İstiklal Avenue, Istanbul.
