= Peter Kane (magician) =

British magician

- Born: 1938; England, United Kingdom
- Died: 18 March 2004 (aged 65–66)
- Occupation: professional magician
- Known for: sleight of hand, card magic, coin magic

Peter Kane (1938 – 18 March 2004) was a British magician born in England. Kane created some memorable close-up magic effects. He contributed many routines to various magic periodicals.

== Published works ==
- A Card Session
- Another Card Session (1971)
- A Further Card Session (1975)
- Combined Card Sessions (1982)
- Kane at the Card Table
- Kane's Variant
- Wild Card Plus
- Kane (1982)
- one card wonders

== See also ==
- List of magicians
- Card magic
- Coin magic
- sleight of hand
