= Mahdi Moudini =

Iranian illusionist (born 1979)

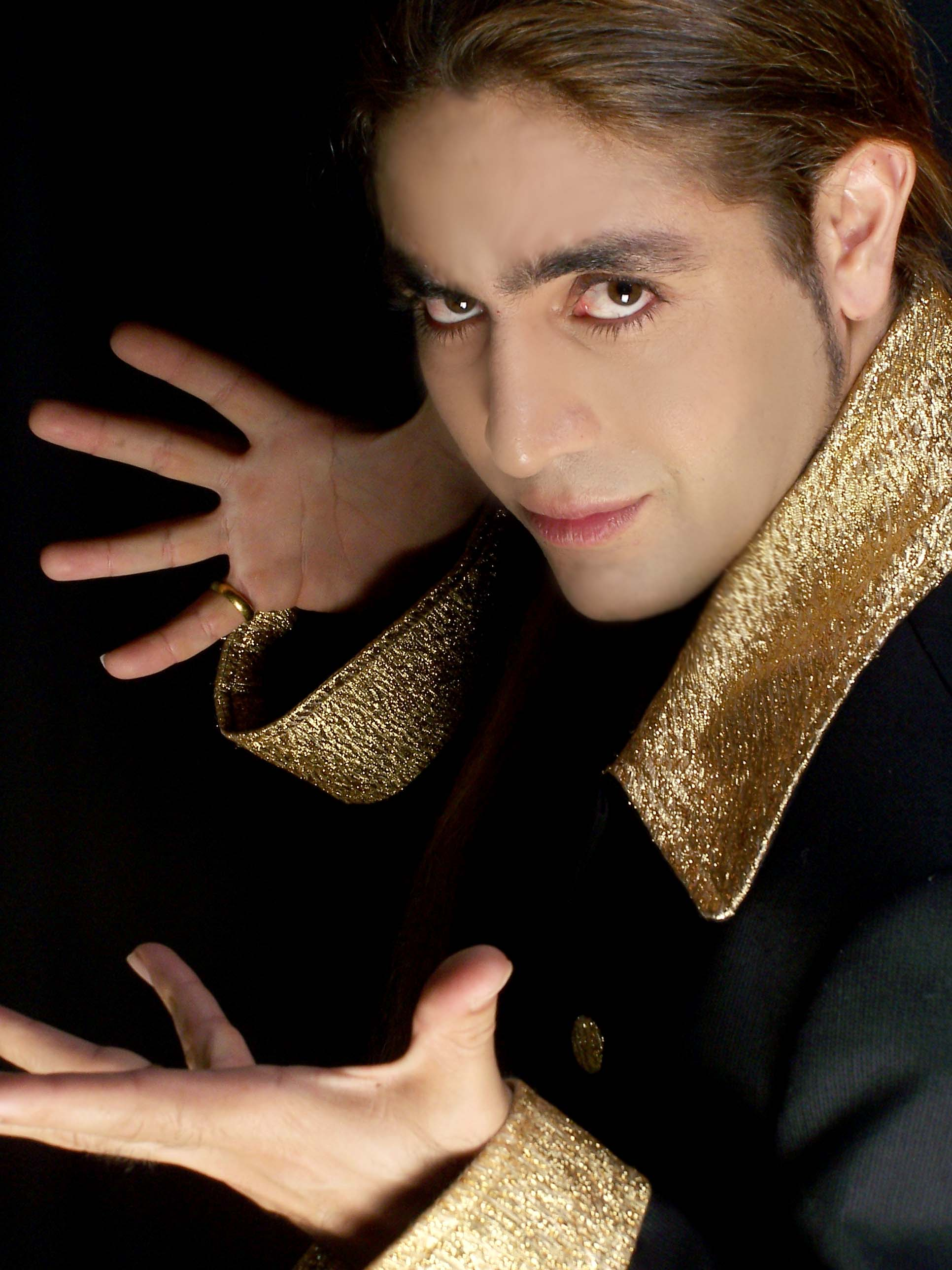
- Mahdi Moudini
- Born: Mahdi Moammer; March 14, 1979 (age 47); Karaj, Iran
- Occupations: Magician, illusionist
- Years active: 1984–present
- Website: www.facebook.com/mahdimoudini

Mahdi Moudini (born Mahdi Moammer; March 14, 1979) is an Iranian illusionist best known for his stage and close-up magic around the world. He has been described as the most commercially demanded magician in Malaysia and expat celebrity. Two of his latest wonder shows were the series of Magical Moudini and levitation along the famous Kuala Lumpur Tower. Moudini currently is the International Magicians Society (IMS) ambassador to Malaysia.

== Early years ==
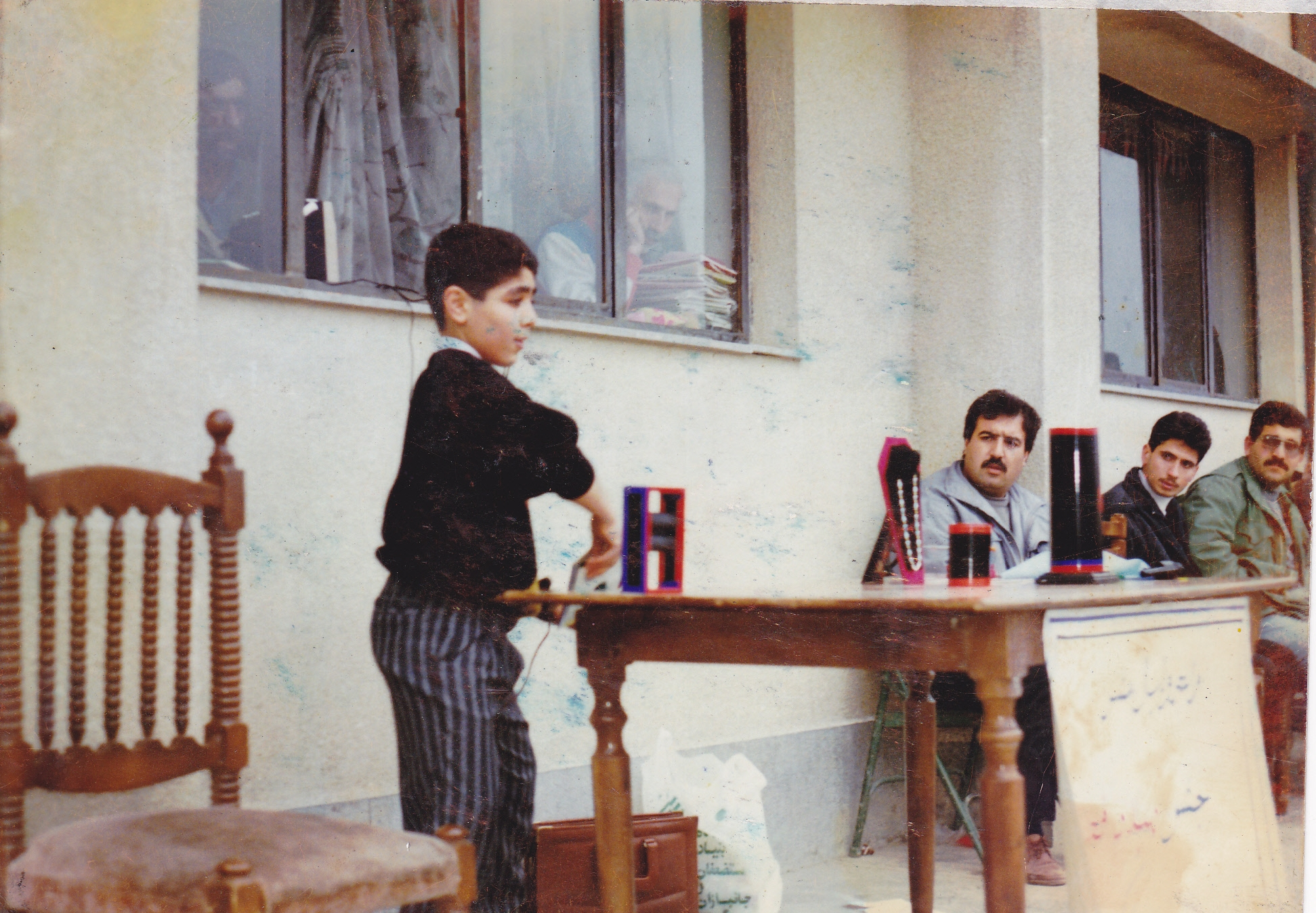
Mahdi Moudini performing in his school

Mahdi studied magic under the tutelage of his grandfather and father who were both performing magicians in Iran. He began performing magic when he was 5 years old, holding shows in his home city of Karaj.

At the age of 18 he moved to Kuala Lumpur, Malaysia as the political situation in Tehran prohibited him in performing live stage magic. He is currently performing extensively in Malaysia and South-east Asia region. In line with Malaysia's mourn and passion for the lost lives of disappeared Malaysia Airlines Flight 370 (MH370), he perform an official memorial show in Kuala Lumpur International Airport (KLIA) on 3 April 2014.

== Awards ==
Mahdi has received eight Merlin Award from the International Magicians Society. He received the award of "Best Iranian Stage Magician 2012" for his stage magic performances, "Most Extreme Magician Asia 2013" for his close-up magic involving snakes and fire, "Best Illusionist Malaysia 2014", "Best Show Producer 2015", "Celebrity Magician of the Year 2016", Magician of the Year 2017", "Illusionist of the Year 2018" and most recently "Hollywood Star Illusionist 2019" for his innovative illusions. The McMillan Woods Global Awards 2016 also awarded to him as the Illusionist Extraordinaire of the year.
