= Kurt Adams =

Kurt Adams may refer to:

== Sportsmen ==
- Kurt Adams (Canadian football) (born 1987)

== Others ==
- Kurt Adams (politician) (1889–1944), German politician
- 'Kurt Adams', a pseudonym used by Jimmy Van Heusen in the authorship of the song "Somewhere Along the Way"

== See also ==
- Curtis Adams (disambiguation)
