= Steve Wyrick =

- Born: May 12, 1970 (age 55); Garland, Texas
- Occupation(s): Illusionist, magician

Steve Wyrick (born May 12, 1970) is an American magician from Garland, Texas. Wyrick is best known for four-walling as a headliner in Las Vegas, Nevada for more than 15 years, having starred at Planet Hollywood Resort/Casino, Aladdin Casino, Sahara Casino, and at the Las Vegas Hilton. He was featured in The World's Greatest Magic series on NBC in the 1990s. Awards include the "prestigious" Merlin Award as Magician of the Year for the International Magicians Society, the world's largest magic organization. Wyrick also headlined for multi-month performances in Atlantic City at Harrah's Casino and at the Golden Nugget Resort

Wyrick has appeared on a variety of television shows, including appearances on Late Night with David Letterman, The Ellen DeGeneres Show, The History Channel, and VH1's Celebracadabra. Wyrick also appeared on TLC's American Chopper with the Teutel Family of Orange County Choppers, when they presented Wyrick with a custom-made chopper dubbed "SW1000" in honour of Wyrick's 1,000th performance at Planet Hollywood Resort & Casino in Las Vegas. Additionally, Wyrick was featured on an episode of A&E’s "Shipping Wars" (S4E1) in which he needed a wind turbine illusion prop shipped from Las Vegas, NV to Atlantic City, NJ.
