= Michael Kent (comedian) =

American comedian and magician (born 1979)

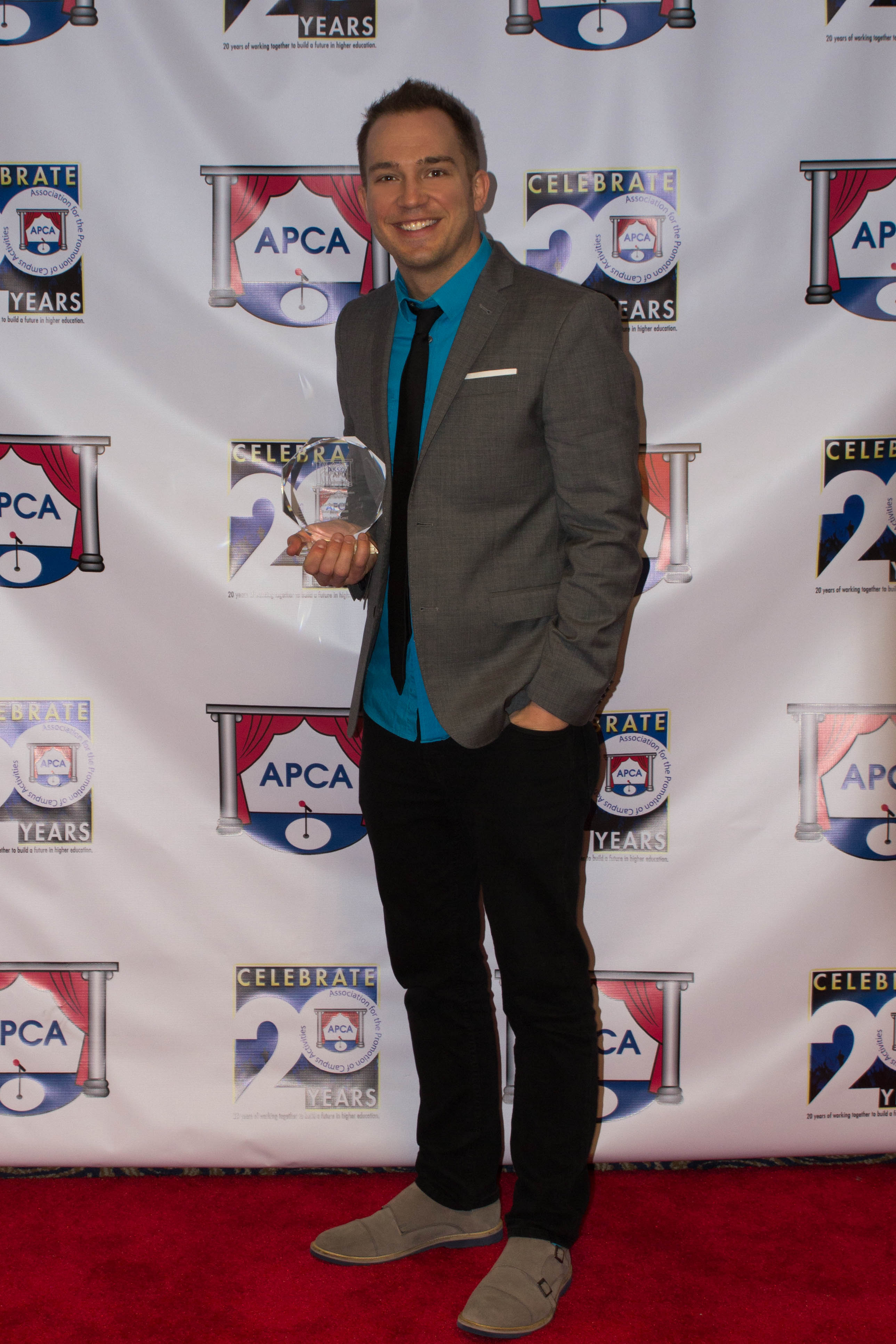
- Kent receiving the 2014 APCA Magician of the Year Award
- Born: Michael Kent; January 14, 1979 (age 47); Urbana, Ohio, United States
- Education: Ohio State University

Comedy career
- Medium: Stand-up comedy, magic
- Genres: Comedy, magic
- Website: michaelkentlive.com

Michael Kent (born January 14, 1979) is an American comedian and magician from Columbus, Ohio, United States. He tours internationally, primarily performing a stand-up comedy-style magic show in American Colleges and Universities, cruise ships and on overseas military bases.

== Biography ==
Born and raised in Urbana, Ohio, Michael Kent became interested in magic at the age of six and cites watching David Letterman on television as one of his earliest influences in comedy.

Kent is a graduate of Ohio State University, where he majored in Communication and played the snare drum in the OSU Marching Band. He also has spent time in Chicago, Illinois, studying at The Second City Training Center. He now tours the US performing in as many as 80 colleges a year, often performing in as many as 40 states. Cleveland.com listed Michael, along with Drew Carey, Dave Chappelle and Bob Hope, on its list of "Famously Funny" notable comedians from Ohio.

== Charity ==
In 2011, Kent helped create a series of Public Service Announcements for The Kristen Brooks Hope Center, a suicide prevention hotline, IMAlive.org, and Post Secret to help raise funds for DC Gives Day of Charitable Giving. The PSA's are continuing to be used to raise money for Suicide Prevention. One of the videos features Kent performing magic with a specially printed Suicide Prevention deck of cards. He has also used his performances to raise money for the National Alliance for Mental Illness.

== Awards and notable performances ==
=== Penn & Teller: Fool Us ===
Kent was featured on the Season 3 premiere of Penn & Teller: Fool Us on The CW, hosted by Alyson Hannigan. He performed the Multiplying Martini Bottles and did not fool Penn & Teller. Penn Jillette said of Kent's performance:

I wanna really address something important here that there's this view that laypeople have, and I think even some magicians have, that real technical skill – sleight of hand skill – is cards or coins, small stuff you manipulate, and you can palm; you can do all this. With apparatus magic, they often think that the props are doing the trick. I want people to know how hard this is to do. It's a really hard thing to handle. The speed that you do that; the clarity, the cleanness ... not only are you– obviously you're funny, but everybody knows that. And obviously you're likeable, everybody knows that. But what they may not know is just handling those props – if you told somebody, "Here are the props, here's how it's done, here are the secrets," they would still stumble through it for months. And you just have a beautiful presentation.

Penn & Teller: Fool Us Ep. 304

=== Campus Activities ===
Kent was named "2014 Entertainer of the Year" after being nominated for the award in Campus Activities Magazine for three consecutive years in 2012, 2013 and 2014. Kent has seven career nominations in the publication after having been nominated for Best Rising Star and Best Small Venue Artist in 2009. The Association for the Promotion of Campus Activities (APCA) named him 2014 Magician of the Year. He has been selected as a showcase performer at more than a dozen Regional and National showcases for the National Association of Campus Activities and the Association for the Promotion of Campus Activities.

=== Military/USO performances ===
In 2008, Kent was extended a personal invitation to perform a series of private shows for the U.S. Navy Blue Angels Flight Demonstration Squadron. In an air show in Ypsilanti, Michigan, they extended an offer to give Kent a VIP ride in Fat Albert, a Lockheed C-130 Hercules aircraft during its air show flight demonstration.

In February 2010, Kent performed a tour for the U.S. Army's MWR Dept. in South Korea. Kent had to undergo training to become a military contractor for the tour, which sent him to 12 Army Garrisons throughout the month. In December 2012, Kent was invited by Navy Entertainment to spend Christmas and New Years performing on Naval Bases throughout Asia. He toured through Tokyo, Philippines, Thailand, Diego Garcia, Okinawa and Guam performing alongside the Kelly Bell Band, a blues band from Baltimore, Maryland. In April 2015, Kent flew around the world performing on Navy Bases to celebrate the "Month of the Military Child. The grueling schedule had Kent flying to a new country almost every other day for a month. He was asked to return to many of those bases to perform his show again in 2016.

In 2024, he traveled to the Middle East to perform for American Naval Forces serving at NSA Bahrain in the Kingdom of Bahrain and on-board the aircraft carrier USS Dwight D. Eisenhower while at sea.

In total, Kent has performed on 29 military installations throughout the world and continues to dedicate time to entertain United States Armed Forces.

== Original creations ==
In 2011, Kent invented and released an original effect, "repAIR," a popped and restored balloon effect that allows the magician to start and end with empty hands. This effect was the first of its kind in the history of magic, both in plot and method.

== Acting/On-Screen Projects ==
In 2020, Kent introduced a weekly live-stream talk show, Joke/Story/Trick LIVE. The show had several notable guests in its 60 episode run including Congressman Mark Pocan (D-WI), Comedians Hal Sparks, John Fugelsang, Bruce Vilanch, Larry Hankin, Pro Wrestler Eugene, and U.S. Navy Seal Kristin Beck. Kent has also worked as a commercial actor, appearing in television commercials and industrials and as a print model for companies ranging from Intel, AEP, The Ohio Lottery, Miami Valley Gaming and Kemba Financial.
