= Tommy Wind =

American magician (born 1990)

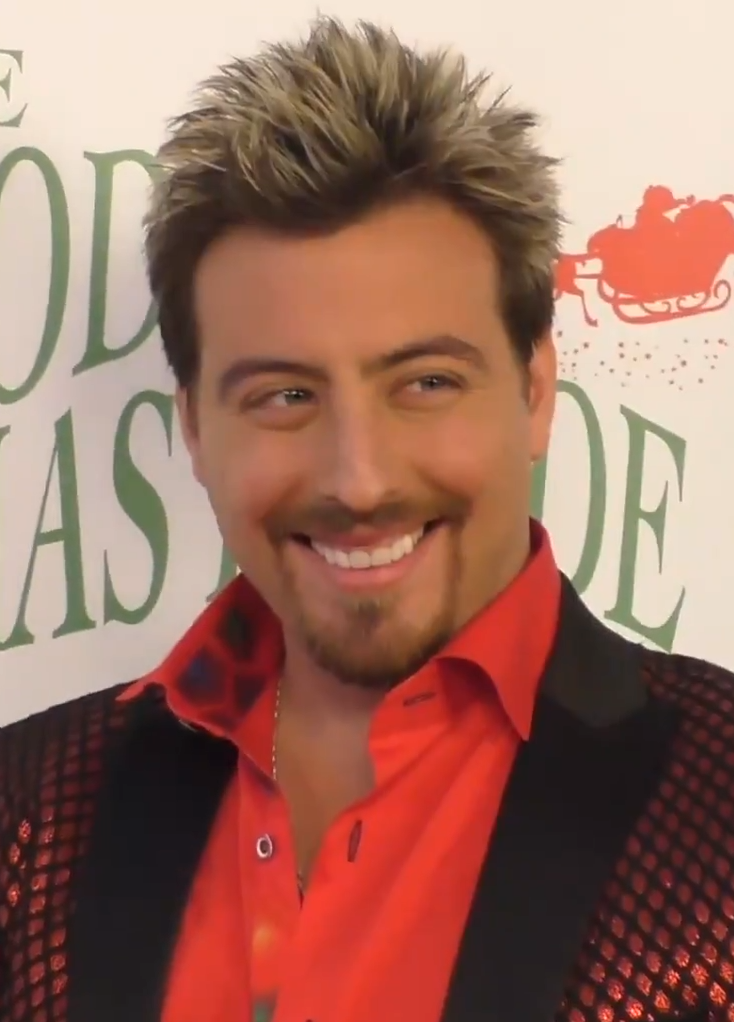
- Tommy Wind in 2016
- Born: 1990 (age 35–36); Staten Island
- Occupation: Illusionist
- Known for: Youngest magician to perform in Las Vegas
- Spouse: Stacy Wind

Tommy Wind is a magician from Staten Island in New York City. He has performed in many of his own original shows, combining illusion with rock and roll music, in New York City, Atlantic City, New Jersey, and Las Vegas, Nevada.

Tommy began his career when he was only 7 after his grandfather introduced him to magic by showing him the disappearing hanky trick. He has appeared in TV shows including Criss Angel's "Mindfreak" and NBC's "I Do!", and also performed in the Masters of Illusion Live show at Bally’s Hotel and Casino, and in 25 episodes of the TV counterpart.

In 2009, Wind received an award for Best Teen Magician from the World Magic Awards. In 2016, Wind won the Merlin Award for Best Family Friendly Magic Show in the World. As of 2019, Wind is performing at the Oyo Hotel & Casino near the Las Vegas Strip in Paradise, Nevada.
