= Aaron Smith (magician) =

American magician (born 1976)

Aaron K Smith
- Born: December 10, 1976 (age 49); U.S.
- Occupations: Writer, inventor
- Website: MRGADFLY.com

Aaron Smith (born 1976) is an American writer, illustrator, and inventor of magic tricks.

== Mr. Gadfly Magazine ==
Aaron Smith was the creator and managing editor of Mr. Gadfly, Journal for Card Magicians, from 2001 to 2002. Mr. Gadfly gained notoriety among magicians as the first magic magazine with a forum devoted solely to its content, wherein readers could communicate directly with the magazine's columnists. Mr. Gadfly was also the first magic magazine published in both electronic and print formats. Magicians subscribed to the print edition and received the electronic issues free.

== Companies ==
Aaron Smith is the founder of The Magic Depot, a magic trick retailer in Oklahoma, and Gadfly Magic, the production company for his more than one-hundred products currently distributed to magicians worldwide. Much of his earlier work is now out of print.

== Magic Broadcast ==
Though a silent partner at the time, along with Gerald Kirchner and Ryan Pilling, in 2004 Aaron Smith founded the now defunct Magic Broadcast. Magic Broadcast was the first radio station devoted solely to magic. The station quickly grew to six satellite offices operating in three countries, the U.S., Canada, and the U. K.

== Magic Products ==
Some of Aaron Smith's magic productions include Mind Leaper (1999), Silk Through Card (1992), Behold the Scarabaeus (2006), Poor Boy ZipTie Escape (2009), STAT Bloody Tongue Skewer (2010), Mental Marker Special FX Pen (2010) and Mental Marker FX Juice (2012), Borrowed & Tied (2011), Flight of the Bubble Gum (2011), Wand Scrolls (2012), Flight Force Five (2012), Poor Boy Billet Knife (2008), and the Old World Siberian Chain Escape (2013) and Ankle Chain Quick-Connect (2013). Aaron Smith introduced the Wizard PK Ring to the U.S. magic community in 2006 on behalf of its inventors. He also negotiated permission for the term "PK" from Magic City, who became the first U. S. magic jobber for the Wizard PK Ring and Vortex PK Ring product lines.

== Author ==
The crime thriller, "No Family For Cannibals - Episode One," was released in July 2014 as part of 412C Season One, under the name Aaron K Smith. (ISBN 9781310272745)[14][15]

== See also ==
- List of magicians
- The Magic Circle
- The Magic Castle
- Society of American Magicians
