= Celebracadabra =

- Contestants
- Created by: VH1
- Directed by: Michael Dimich; Jason Sklaver
- Opening theme: Casey 'Schpilkas' Dunmore & Chris 'Kid' Reid
- Country of origin: United States
- No. of episodes: 9

Production
- Executive producers: Shelly Tatro; Karla Hidalgo; Christopher Martin; Michael Hirschorn
- Producer: Brandon Waite
- Cinematography: John Armstrong
- Editor: Mike Bulkey
- Running time: 60 mins.
- Production company: VH1

Original release
- Network: VH1
- Release: April 27 – June 12, 2008

Celebracadabra is an American reality television series on VH1 that premiered on April 27, 2008. The series involves celebrities attempting to learn and perform magic. Magician/actor Jonathan Levit serves as the host. On Thursday, June 12, 2008, C. Thomas Howell was named Greatest Celebrity Magician.

== Contestants ==
| Celebrity | Magic Coach | Celebrity Status | Show Result |
| C. Thomas Howell | David Regal | Actor, Writer, Director, Producer, TV Host and Radio Personality | Winner |
| Hal Sparks | Rocco Silano | Actor and Comedian | Eliminated Episode 8 |
| Lisa Ann Walter | Silly Billy | Actress and Comedian | Eliminated Episode 6 |
| Kimberly Wyatt | Murray Sawchuck | Singer/Dancer of Pussycat Dolls | Eliminated Episode 5 |
| Christopher "Kid" Reid | Derek Hughes | Actor/Rapper | Eliminated Episode 3 |
| Ant | Asi Wind | Actor and comedian | Eliminated Episode 2 |
| Carnie Wilson | Simon Lovell | Singer | Eliminated Episode 1 |

- There were no eliminations in Episode 4 and 7.

== Episodes ==
=== Episode 1 ===
For the premiere episode of Celebracadabra, the seven celebrities try their hand at magic, paired with professional magicians. This week's first challenge is Street Magic, hitting the streets armed with only their skills to impress the crowds. At the end, only six of the seven celebrities will continue onto next week.

=== Episode 2 ===
For their next challenge, the celebs must play dress-up for a kiddie magic show. Hal forces one of his competitors to wear an undesirable costume, and Ant causes a riot!

=== Episode 3 ===
Our celebrity magicians perform comedy magic for a rowdy and drunken college crowd. One of the contestants faces a severe handicap that may ultimately result in their elimination.

=== Episode 4 ===
They have won the hearts of children and collegiate scholars, but can they win the heart of grandma? In this challenge, the celebrities will entertain residents at a retirement community using only magic that they can fit in their pockets. Plus, a surprise switcharoo of the coaches sends shockwaves through the competition.

=== Episode 5 ===
The celebs are given the challenge of performing Cabaret Magic for a roomful of professional magicians at the Magic Castle. After getting hit with the Zonk prize, one of the celebs has to perform in drag. Meanwhile, Kim and Murray take their bickering to new heights.

=== Episode 6 ===
In their most death-defying challenge yet, the remaining celebs are forced to deal with their greatest fears in Phobia magic. As the winner of the previous week's challenge, Tommy is given the special power of assigning the escapes, and his choice infuriates Hal and shatters their friendship.

=== Episode 7 ===
After six weeks of learning magic and surviving difficult challenges and eliminations, the final two contestants hit the road. They travel from Los Angeles to Sin City for their final performances on a real Vegas stage. Tensions between Hal & Tommy continue to run high as they choose their illusions, practice their tricks and attempt to create a show that will impress their Las Vegas audience.

=== Episode 8 ===
It's time for their final performances! Who will walk away with the $100,000 grand prize and the title of "World's Greatest Celebrity Magician"?

=== Episode 9 ===
This season on Celebracadabra, seven celebrities tried to become magicians. Some succeeded, and some failed... miserably. And while the celebrities took center stage, their coaches were forced to stand in the background... until now. It's the Celebracadabra Magician Special – ten all-star magicians perform their favorite tricks.

== Celebracadabra Elimination History ==
Eliminations
| Order | Celebrities | Episodes | | | | | | |
| Order | Celebrities | 1 | 2 | 3 | 4 | 5 | 6 | 8 |
|---|---|---|---|---|---|---|---|---|
| 01 | Ant | Hal | Thomas | Kimberly | Hal | Thomas | Hal | Thomas |
| 02 | C.Thomas Howell | Chris | Chris | Hal | Kimberly | Lisa | Thomas | Hal |
| 03 | Carnie Wilson | Kimberly | Lisa | Lisa | Lisa | Hal | Lisa | |
| 04 | Christopher "Kid" Reid | Ant | Hal | Thomas | Thomas | Kimberly | | |
| 05 | Hal Sparks | Lisa | Kimberly | Chris | | | | |
| 06 | Kimberly Wyatt | Thomas | Ant | | | | | |
| 07 | Lisa Ann Walter | Carnie | | | | | | |

The contestant won the competition.
The contestant was eliminated.
None of the contestants were eliminated.
