= Paul W. Draper =

American mentalist and magician

Paul Draper
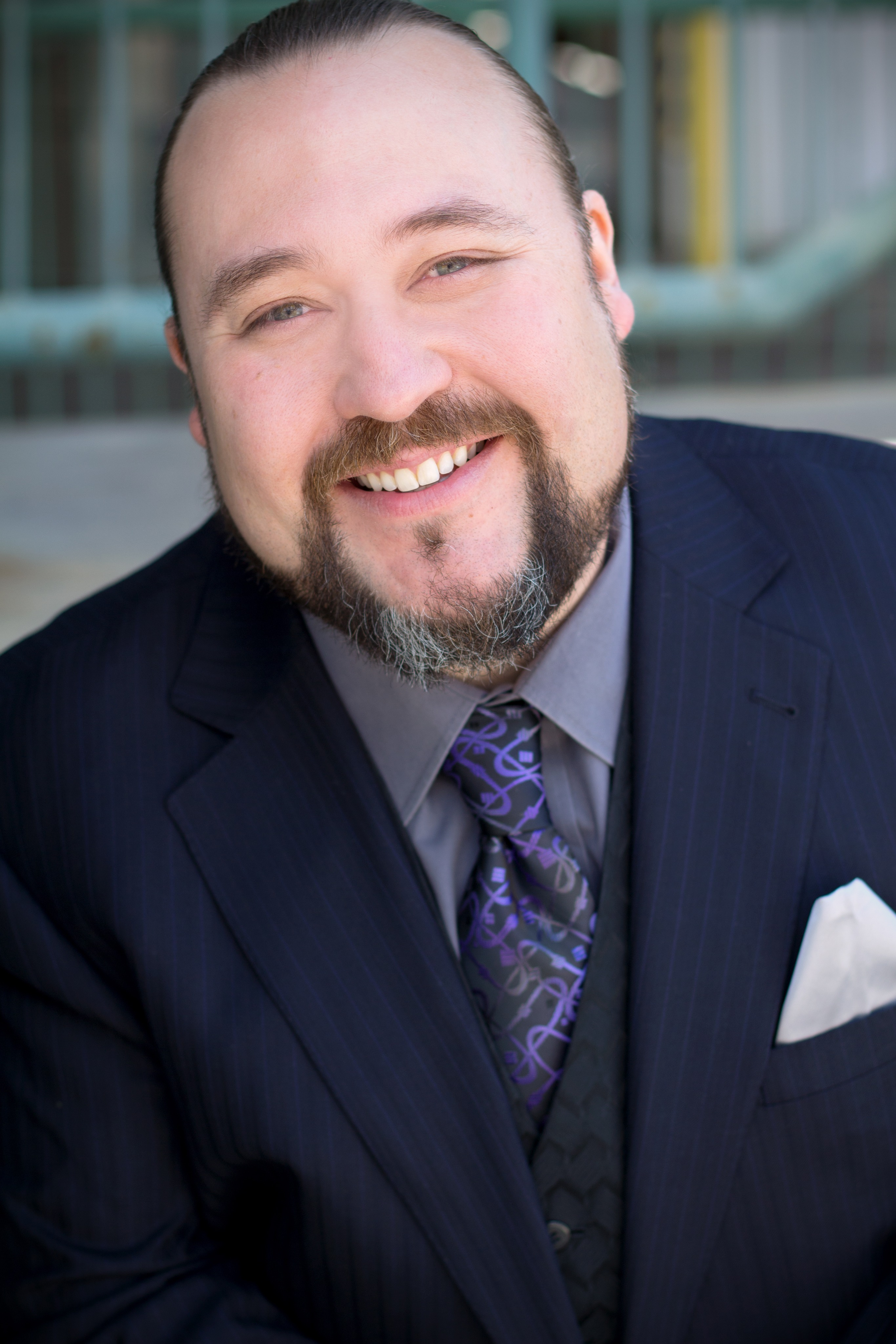
- Born: Paul W. Draper; October 31, 1978 (age 48); Salt Lake City, United States
- Occupations: illusionist, mind reader, mentalist, magician, film maker, actor, anthropologist

Paul W. Draper is an anthropologist, academic, and an award-winning mentalist, magician, and film maker. As an anthropologist and communications expert specializing in the cognitive science of religious beliefs, he has lectured at Fortune 500 companies and universities. As the creator of the show Mental Mysteries, Draper blends his academic background as an anthropologist and communications expert with the arts of mentalism and magic. Draper performed live streaming shows during the COVID-19 pandemic.

Paul Draper had an article published in 2023 for the American Anthropological Association. The entire issue of the magazine focused on magicians as collectors of magic artifacts.

Draper was elected to the leadership Council of The Magic Circle in 2023, a London-based British organization and one of the oldest magical societies in the world.

Following a successful Kickstarter campaign his book On Second Thought ... Mentalism, Meaning, and Performance was published in 2026.

== Early life ==
Born in Utah in 1978, Draper first became interested in magic when family members discovered Showplace Magic and Novelty in Salt Lake City.

The first full-length magic show that he saw was at the 49th Street Galleria when he was 7 and then developed his own show and started performing for his grade school every year.

Draper began performing magic for his friends at age 8 and continued performing throughout his school years, lettering in debate, choir, and drama.

In his high school years, he also became a national debate champion in original oratory and a state drama champion in pantomime. At age 16, Draper watched Michael Skinner perform at the Golden Nugget in Las Vegas, which propelled his interest in magic, which eventually led to his discovery of mentalism.

== Career ==
Before embarking on a career in magic and mentalism in Las Vegas, Draper worked as a lecturer in Utah at Westminster College and Weber State University and later as an instructor at the University of Nevada, Las Vegas where he taught communication studies.

In 2004, Draper gave up his full time academic career to follow his "childhood passion" of magic and mentalism. At that time, he began working as the house magician at the Venetian Hotel and Casino in Las Vegas.

For Draper, these two career paths — anthropology and magic — coincide in the study of cognitive science, or how and why people believe what they do.

In 2014, the International Magician's Society awarded Draper the prestigious Merlin Award for Best Corporate Performer.

He has lectured on these topics at Yale University, Apple Cupertino Headquarters, the University of Utah, the University of Southern California, the Magic Castle in Hollywood and The Magic Circle in London.

Draper has appeared as himself in television shows and documentaries, including Hell's Kitchen, Pawn Stars, House Hunters, Criss Angel Mindfreak, HBO-sponsored The Comedy Festival at Caesars Palace, Ghost Adventures, and Houdini: Unlocking the Mystery. He has appeared alongside David Copperfield, Lance Burton, and Teller on the History Channel as a consultant and expert. He appeared as a magician on Hair Battle Spectacular and as a scorpion handler in Guerilla Magic. In March 2018 Draper was the guest scholar for an episode of What'sHerName women's history podcast on "Queen of Magic" Adelaide Herrmann.

Draper has also performed as an emcee.

He has appeared at Comic Con as a moderator in a celebrity panel interview.

In addition to performing, Draper also works as a consultant and guest lecturer for businesses.

He has designed special effects for theater and acted as a religious advisor for theater companies, drawing on his Jewish faith background. Paul Draper was also featured in an article by Makezine on his historical knowledge of Houdini's Legacy and Magicians in the Maker community.

He was profiled in a six-page cover story in the August 2021 edition of The Magic Circular Magazine in London, England, the publication of The Magic Circle. He was previously profiled in a six-page cover story in the March 2017 edition of M-U-M Magazine, the publication of the Society of American Magicians.

He is a member of the senior faculty of the McBride Magic & Mystery School.

Draper sits on the board of directors for the Inclusion Center for Community and Justice.

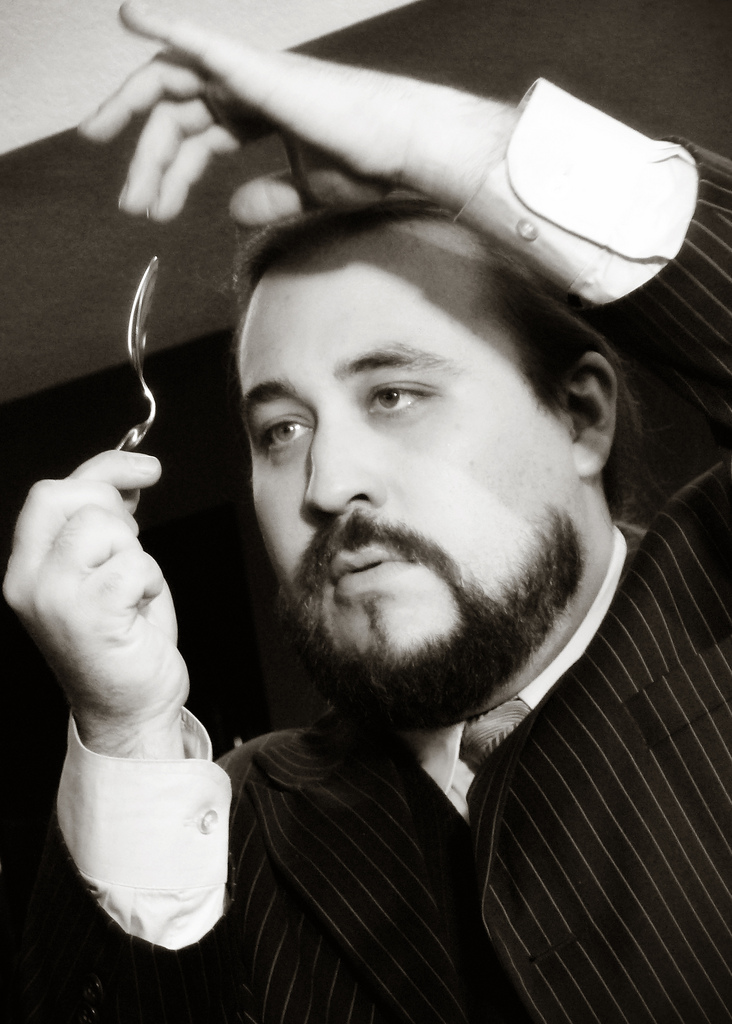
Paul W. Draper performing a spoon-bending act

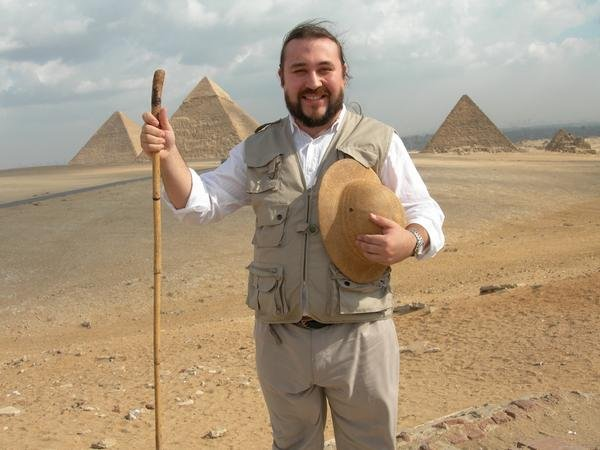
Paul W Draper pictured in Egypt

During the 2020 COVID-19 pandemic Draper began offering live magic shows over streaming platforms, and presented educational lectures to assist other performers.

He has been an Adjunct Instructor at Soka University of America for the following classes : Learning Cluster: The Art of Magic, Core 1: Enduring Questions of Humanity and Modes of Inquiry: Questioning and Exploring Truth. In February 2026 Paul gave a talk at the University of Cambridge on The Cybersecurity Awareness Experience: A Masterclass in Social Engineering, Behavioral Psychology, and Digital Self-Defense.

In December 2024 Draper appeared on Inside the NBA where he performed for Shaq and Charles Barkley.

== Select awards ==
- 2002 PCAM first place award winner for mentalism
- 2014 Merlin Award for Best Corporate Performer, International Magicians Society

== Select work ==
=== Film, television and radio/podcasts appearances ===
- Inside the NBA with Shaq and Charles Barkley
- The Hallmark Channel, appears with The Mentalist star Tim Kang
- What'sHerName women's history podcast, "THE DISAPPEARING WOMAN: Adelaide Herrmann"
- The Magic Word Podcast, "An Hour With Paul Draper" February 2013
- Penguin Magic Podcast with Erik Tait
- The Branding For Entertainers Podcast
- The Magician's Code Podcast with Hadlen, "Manifesting Mystery (feat. Paul Draper)" Episode #009

=== Publications ===
- Draper, Paul, On Second Thought ... Mentalism, Meaning, and Performance
- Penguin Magic Live Act Lecture
- Penguin Magic Live Lecture
- Murphy's Magic At the Table Experience
- Draper, Paul and Joseph P. Zompetti. Misinformation, Magic, and Mendacity: Peeking Behind the Curtain to Explore the World of Deception. November 21, 2025.
- "Mentalist and Magician Paul Draper Teams Up With Vegas, Broadway, and Late-Night TV Stars", Live Event, 2021, Ft. Myers, Fla.
- The Pitch, short, 2009 Utah 48 Hour Film Project (winner of Audience Favorite and Best Writing, 2009 Salt Lake City 48 Hour Film Project)
