= Morgan Strebler =

American magician (born 1976)

- On location in Hollywood California during the filming of PopTV's Don't Blink.
- Born: Matthew Glenn Milligan; April 10, 1976 (age 50); Sikeston, Missouri, U.S.
- Occupations: Illusionist, magician
- Height: 6 ft 1 in (185 cm)
- Spouse: Julie Russell 1999–present
- Children: 2
- Website: MorganStrebler.com

Morgan Strebler (born Matthew Glenn Milligan, April 10, 1976 in Sikeston, Missouri) is an American psychological illusionist, actor, director, writer and producer. Strebler started practicing magic at the age of seven after seeing a live Harry Blackstone Jr. performance. As an adult, Strebler started his acting career and moved to Las Vegas where he started construction on his multimillion-dollar illusion show. Some of his earliest acting roles inculcated Sesame Street and at 17 he was on the Young and the Restless and Guiding Light.

== Biography ==
Morgan's entree into the World of Illusion began as a child when his parents gave him a magic set for his birthday. He began performing for family and friends.

By his early teens, he performed close-up and stage magic for birthday parties, corporate events and church functions. Before achieving success, Strebler worked odd jobs ranging from a magician pitchman at Houdini's magic shop to working security at nightclubs in Las Vegas.

Strebler developed a professional persona around his signature "Liquid Metal" routine in order to distinguish himself from other magicians. In 2003, he was asked to perform at Neverland Ranch for Joe Jackson's birthday party. Later, he performed two nights a week at V bar inside The Venetian and then five nights a week at the Bellagio Hotel and Casino inside the Caramel lounge. His regular performances later led to a comedy show at the Hard Rock Hotel and Casino called Beachers Madhouse.

== Morgan Strebler Day ==
On March 7, 2016, the mayor of Sikeston, Missouri read a proclamation observing it as Morgan Strebler Day.

== Morgan Strebler vs Criss Angel ==
On January 8, 2007, Strebler issued a press release publicly challenging Criss Angel to "Live Close up, Live Stage Illusions", to be judged by a live audience, and to an endurance contest of Chinese water torture. Angel did not respond to the challenge and several months later a cover article in Street Magic Magazine described Strebler as "the man Criss Angel fears". In 2011, Strebler publicly apologized to Angel on the Itricks podcast resulting in Angel and Strebler reconciling.

== The Man Who Bends Steel ==
Warner Brothers/DC Comics has given Morgan Strebler approval on January 5, 2014 to officially use "The Man Who Bends Steel" as his name/tag line. Just to clarify, so there absolutely no confusion, Morgan is not affiliated with Warner Brothers or DC Comics in any way, or their brand. He also not affiliated with any of their characters.

== Filmography ==
Year	Title	Role	
1984	Sesame Street (TV series)	Kid	Episode: 16.2
1993	The Young and the Restless (TV series)	Brad	episodes 1.5052
1994	Guiding light (TV series)	Mark	episode April 13, 1994
1998	Urban Legend	College Student (uncredited)	
2000	Nash Bridges (TV series)	Pool Guy	episode "jackpot" pt1
2001	The Mexican	Security Guard (uncredited)	
2002	Law and Order:Criminal Intent (TV series)	Homeless Guy	episode The Third Horseman
2012	The Walking Dead (TV series)	Walker	episode When the Dead Come Knocking
2014	Masters of Illusions (TV series)	Himself	episodes Evil Met His Match, Blindfold
2015	Don't Blink (TV series)	Himself	episodes Mind Games and Blister Burns(2015) Glass Mutation, Erasing Time, and Pasta Surprise (2015) Metamorphoses, Mind Melds, and Motion Suspension (2015), London Calling, Burnt Offerings, and Deadly Levitations (2015)
2016	Between Life and Death (TV Movie)	Psychic Entertainer / Mentalist	(post-production)

Year	Title	Role
2016	Between Life and Death (TV series)	Director, writer, Executive Producer

== 36th Annual Superman Celebration ==
Morgan Strebler was invited as special guest in 2014 to the Superman Celebration in Metropolis, IL, and was asked to perform multiple shows on the main stage. From the Official press release on 5-7-14 Taking the stage and amazing the crowds with illusions will be Morgan Strebler, The Man Who Bends Steel. Strebler is a Bootheel Missouri native who calls Las Vegas home. Beginning in his early teens, Strebler has perfected the art of PsychoKinetic magic and is considered one of the world's leading experts and performers in this field. He became the youngest magician in the world to catch a live bullet between his teeth. Strebler has performed at Caesar's Palace, the Bellagio and the Venetian and has traveled internationally performing to more than a million people. He has entertained Hollywood stars and celebrities and has been on TV in 75 countries and performed on five continents. Strebler will take the stage on Friday at noon and 3:00 pm, Saturday at 10:00 a.m. and 5:00 pm, and Sunday at noon. You can find Strebler during the celebration on the streets entertaining crowds with close up illusions and magic. During The Superman Celebration Morgan was given "The Superman of Metropolis award" It was signed by the Mayor of Metropolis and the head of the Chamber of Commerce.

== IMS Award ==
In March 2011, Strebler was honored for his metal bending skill with a Merlin Award. In August 2013, Strebler received his second Merlin Award for "Cabaret Magician of the Year". As of October 7, 2015 Morgan has received word that he has won the 2015 Merlin Award for Mentalist of the Year.

== Published author ==
In fall of 2014 Morgan released a hardback book Ice Cold alongside Ulises Galeano, and an Ebook Taste Conditions. Ice Cold can be found in major bookstores such as Barnes & Noble, Amazon Books and many other fine bookstores. Taste Conditions is now available on the Nook, Kindle, and iBooks.

== Publications ==
"The Opener", "The Closer", "Liquid Metal", "Liquid Metal 2", "Spun", "Taste Conditions", "Molten", "Sticky", "Failsafe", "Shadow", "Razor's Edge", "Ice Cold" "Pulse Stop" "Ice Cold DVD Set" "Popsicle sticks" "Toched DVD" "Konnected" "Flatline" "Never There"

== Private life ==
Morgan is the only child to Brenda and Glenn Milligan. Born and raised in Sikeston, MO.

In 1995, Morgan met and fell in love with Julie, his high school sweetheart. They married in 1999 in Las Vegas, NV. Morgan and Julie have two children, Caleb(1996) and Hunter (2006). They currently reside in Las Vegas, NV.

== Liquid Metal Productions ==
In 2011, Strebler formed his own management company, Liquid Metal Productions, booking other magicians' shows around the world. Its roster includes RedStar Cartel, Paul Vigil, Cedric Taylor, and William Draven. Liquid Metal Productions sister company, Record Label (RMG), RedStar Music Group launched in 2012. RMG's first artist signed was rap group RedStar Cartel.

== See also ==
- American Museum of Magic
- International Brotherhood of Magicians
- List of magic publications
- List of magicians
- The Magic Circle
- The Magic Castle
- Society of American Magicians
