= Matt Wayne (magician) =

American magician

- Born: Matthew Wayne Tomasko; March 17, 1986 (age 40); York, Pennsylvania
- Occupation: Magician

Matthew Wayne Tomasko (born March 17, 1986), better known as Matt Wayne, is an American illusionist, producer and television personality. He is best known for his work and skill as a performer of close-up magic. Wayne was born in York, Pennsylvania and is of Slovak descent on his father's side and Russian Jewish on his mother's side. His mother, Robbie Ann, was a Calvin Klein and Gucci model living in Baltimore, Maryland and his father John R. Tomasko is a photographer. When he was five years old, he received a magic set from his grandfather. In 2005, Wayne moved to Fukuoka, Japan and lived solely by performing magic tricks. In 2006, Wayne moved back to the United States and moved to Manhattan, New York.

== Producer ==
Since September 2008, Wayne has been the sole producer behind Emmy Award winner Ted Greenberg from Late Night with David Letterman, and the Off Broadway comedy, The Complete Performer. A parodiable comedy on magic that ends with Greenberg driving audience members home in a yellow taxicab. The show continues to run at the SoHo Playhouse Theatre in New York City.

== Film and television ==
In March 2009, Wayne made his first national television appearance on Wingman, which was broadcast on the Fine Living Network. Wayne also releases educational products for beginners and magicians. His first release entitled, "Got a Light?" has received numerous accolades from magicians including David Roth, Simon Lovell and Eric Decamps. In January 2010, Wayne filmed a segment for Tinka Milinovic's new reality series, The Tinka Show. Wayne will also be seen in the upcoming reality series Doggie Moms set to air in early 2011 on NYC life channel starring girlfriend Karen Biehl.

== Charity ==
In 2010, Wayne lent his likeness to an HIV awareness campaign featuring 250 plus celebrities and social figures. The campaign is called BE-THE-LINK. On September 16, 2010, Wayne launched his charitable show entitled Laff-A-Digitation, a comedy and magic benefit that brought together top comedy talent to raise money for animal rescue. Wayne teamed up with Bideawee, one of the oldest and most respected animal welfare and pet adoption agencies. In attendance were notables including designer John Bartlett, Prince Lorenzo Borghese and Richard Pryor Jr. Wayne is also heavily involved in supporting animal rights and has donated a lot of time helping North Shore Animal League, Broadway Barks and Stray from the Heart.

== Endorsements ==
In June 2009, Matt signed to be the official spokesperson behind the TouchTricks application series, the world's first virtual magic kit for the iPhone and iPod Touch. On September 13, 2010, Matt helped YouTube launch their new Live Stream feature alongside media partner Howcast. He was voted the #1 show to watch during the launch by Gizmodo.com.
