= Terry Evanswood =

American magician

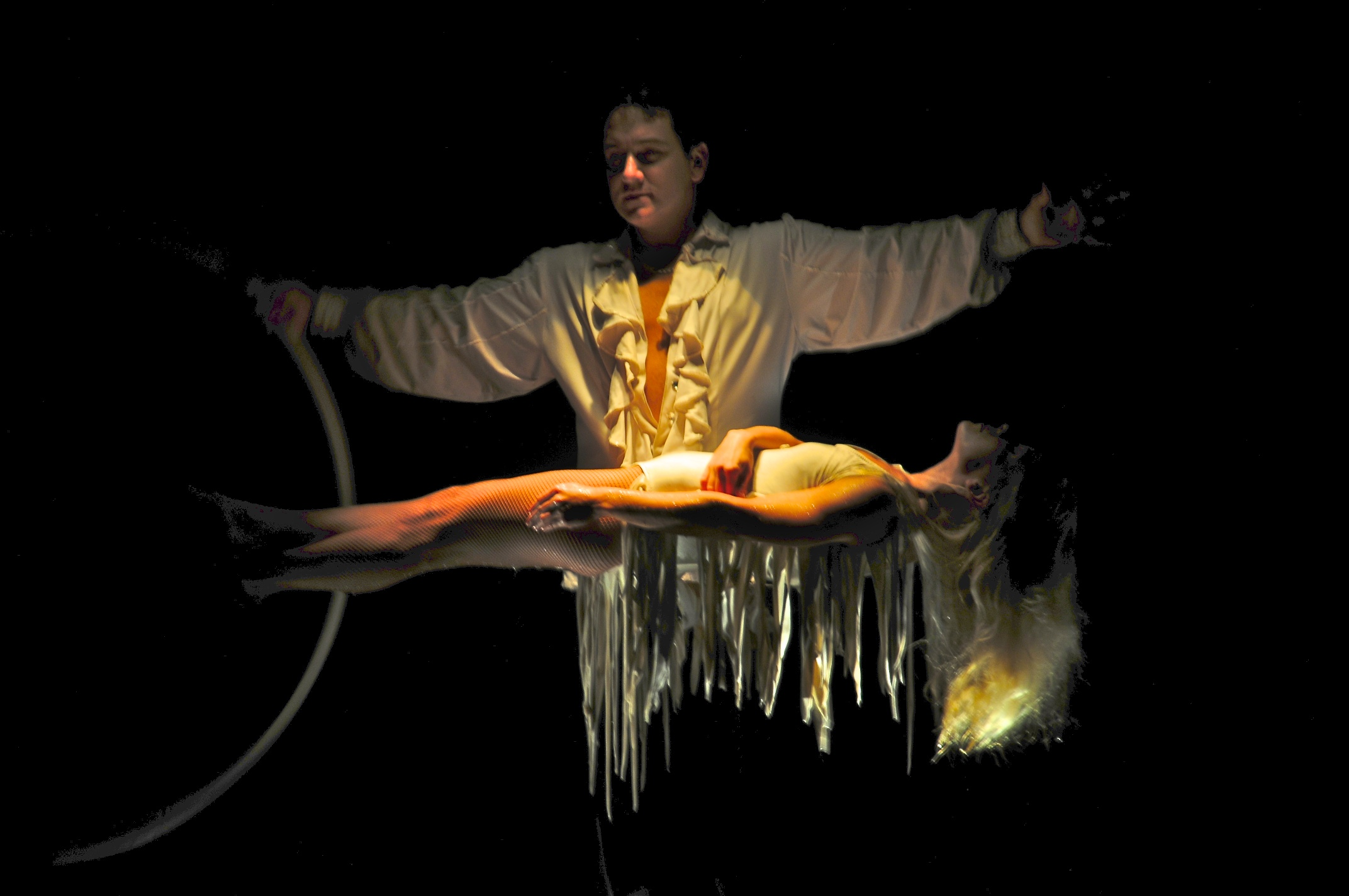
- Born: June 17, 1970 (age 56) (United States) St. Charles, Illinois
- Occupations: magician, illusionist

Terry Evanswood is a Merlin Award-winning professional magician who has appeared in live stage shows and on television throughout the United States as well as on international stages. He has performed professionally since the age of ten. Early in his career, Evanswood was awarded an entertainment scholarship to attend the Chavez College of Magic. In 1991, Evanswood became the youngest illusionist in history to perform at Hollywood's famed Magic Castle.

== Career ==
Evanswood is a member of the International Brotherhood of Magicians and the Society of American Magicians and is a lifetime member of the International Magicians Society (IMS).

Evanswood toured Alaska as onboard entertainment for several cruise lines. He had his own theater show called Magic Beyond Belief in Pigeon Forge, Tennessee. He also performed at the Magic Beyond Belief theater at WonderWorks in a show called "The Wonders of Magic."

Evanswood has performed in The Grand Majestic Theater, a theater in Pigeon Forge, in a showing titled "The Magic of Terry Evanswood."
