= Fred Culpitt =

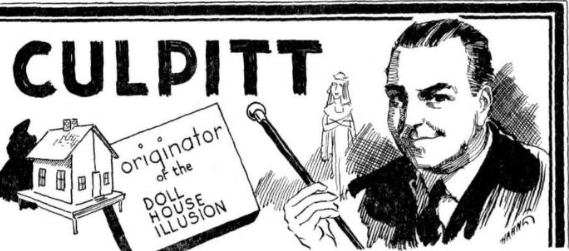
- Occupation: Magician

Frederick Willis Culpitt (9 May 1877, in Southwark St Saviour, London – 1944 in Wandsworth, in London) was an English stage magician and magic inventor. He achieved stage success in the early part of the 20th century with a comedy magic act and is also notable as the first magician to appear on a regularly scheduled television show.

Culpitt got his first big break when the American "chinese-style" magician Chung Ling Soo booked him for a tour of Australia in 1909. Between 1914 and 1918 Culpitt replaced David Devant at St. George's Hall, London, performing as a "magical comedian".

Culpitt is credited with inventing the Doll's House Illusion, the Costume Trunk Illusion and the Silk To Egg Trick, which continue to be used by magicians. He is also credited with devising methods for the Torn and restored newspaper trick and various other effects that have become a part of the stage magic repertoire.

In 1936 the BBC began test broadcasts from Alexandra Palace, London, for the world's first regular television service. In an effort to find material that would work well on the new medium the corporation sought entertainment acts that had a strong visual element. Culpitt was recruited to present magic, thus helping to establish a lasting place for magic in television variety programming.

Also in 1936, Culpitt appeared in the film Keep Your Seats, Please, which starred George Formby. According to the British Film Catalogue, Culpitt, in a small supporting role, played a magician.
