= Charles Cameron (magician) =

Scottish magician

Charles W. Cameron
- Born: 31 October 1927; Edinburgh
- Died: 7 January 2001 (aged 73)
- Other names: Daemon, Count Dracula (Stage names)

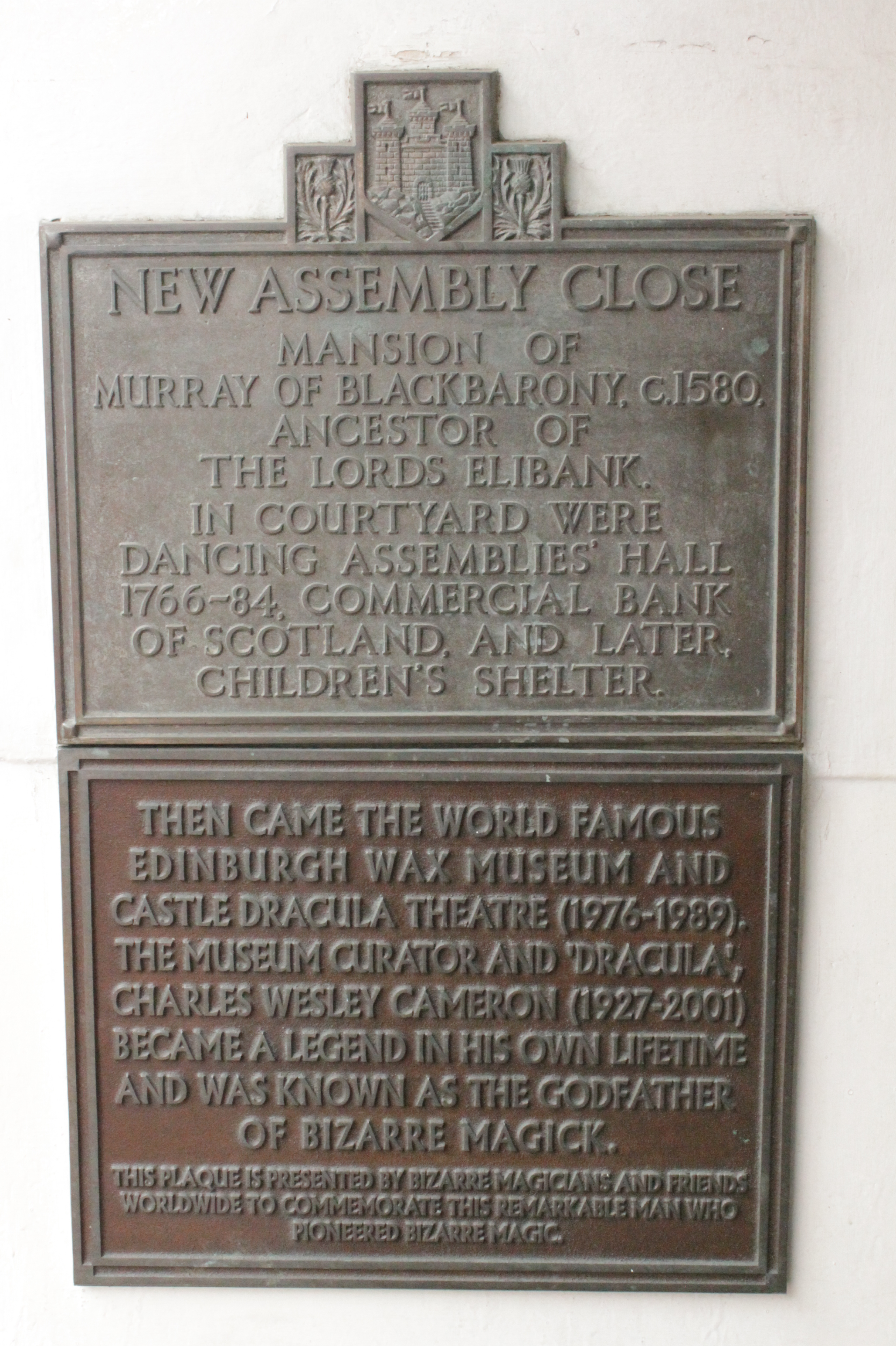
Plaque to Charles Cameron, New Assembly Close, Edinburgh

Charles Wesley Cameron (31 October 1927 – 7 January 2001) was a professional magician who specialized in a style known as bizarre magic. He was born in Edinburgh, Scotland, and has a younger brother.

He was a magician, commonly dubbed as the Godfather of Bizarre Magic.

== Early life ==
Born on Halloween, 31 October 1927, Charles took a keen interest in magic from very early on in his life, and started conducting his own experiments at age seven. He was educated at Edinburgh's Royal High School and served with the Royal Air Force in the Middle East during World War II.

His only leaning to convention was when he became an accountant and worked with different commercial outlets throughout Edinburgh, including the Sports Council. His brother George became highly qualified in the insurance field and is a published photographer and cartoonist.

At one stage in Charles' varied career, he studied psychology, but this was not completed due to the need to study medicine and the dissections that this route entailed.

== Magic Career ==
In 1947, Charles became one of the founding members of the Edinburgh Magic Circle . Working in tandem with Roy Scott and Harry Burnside, he took part in mentalism, along with straight magic, close-up magic, and many other forms. He was elected President of the Edinburgh Magic Circle at least three times.

Early in his career, Charles performed on the club circuit with his own magic shows, cabaret spots at home and abroad, tarot readings, TV shows, newspaper and magazine features, and numerous interviews. He was devastated when his close friend and mentor, Tony Andruzzi, died in tragic circumstances. Charles and Tony shared many likings – Famous Grouse whisky, smoking, and a deep interest in the bizarre.

He was a student of the occult and had a regular slot on Radio Forth doing daily predictions and ghost stories. His home in Haddington housed his collection of unusual artifacts and books.

=== Edinburgh Wax Museum ===
Charles was owner and Curator of the Edinburgh Wax Museum on the Royal Mile from 1976 to 1989. During the mid-1980's, Charles operated the Castle Dracula Theater on the top floor of the museum. During the day, he hosted visitors. At night, he performed as "Count Dracula", using a coffin and a cloak as part of his costume. Performing mind-reading and mock ghostly seances, the theater ran for almost three years.

The Wax Museum closed in 1989, and all the wax models were disposed of. The museum had been one of the highlights of the Edinburgh tourist trail.

=== Radio and television ===
Charles scripted and narrated his own weekly show, titled "Friday Frighteners" on Radio Forth. In addition, he prepared daily and weekly horoscopes for Radio Forth for several years and did a weekly hour-long phone-in show on astrology. He scripted and narrated numerous programs on the supernatural for Radio Forth and the BBC. On Radio Forth he also had his own show "Beyond the Unknown". "Beyond the Unknown" lasted for four series. The first three series consisted of twenty-five programs and the fourth was a collection of ghost stories.

Charles appeared on Scottish television on numerous occasions, as well as on some French, German, Italian, and American shows. He was a member of the Lothian Players, an amateur theatrical group, in which he took lead roles in various pantomimes and musical reviews. He had also been an extra in the films, 'Chariots of Fire', 'Lucia', 'Conquest of The South Pole' and 'Looking After Jo Jo'.

=== Magical societies ===
Charles was a member of many magical societies during his life.

- The Edinburgh Magic Circle (past President)
- International Brotherhood of Sorcerers
- The Esoteric Order of Pan (Arch Mage Ipsissimus)
- The Immortals
- Scottish Association of Magical Societies, ( Lecturer)
- Also retained for many years by the El Project
- The Magik Club (Patron)

== Personal life ==
Charles met and married Nan Sandilands. The couple settled in Haddington, East Lothian and raised two daughters Fiona and Lesley who, between them, gave Charles two grandchildren, Hannah and Jacob. Sadly Nan died of cancer in 1993. Charles subsequently moved back to Edinburgh in 1997.

With his clear diction and enunciation, he did readings for the blind while he lived in Haddington and was also a firm supporter of the Community Day Center in the town. In any spare time available, he rattled collecting cans for various charities including the Poppy Appeal.

== Death ==
Charles died at approximately 10:45 on 7 January 2001, due to a stomach aneurysm.

=== Plaque ===
Soon after the death of Charles W. Cameron, many of his friends discussed the possibility of having a plaque erected in the City of Edinburgh as a tribute to the Godfather of Bizarre Magic. It was hoped that the plaque would be erected on the building or in the entrance of what had formerly been the Edinburgh Wax Museum, where Charles had been its curator during the daytime. During the evening he became 'Dracula' as he played the lead role in his own bizarre and spooky magic show. This show took place in a specially designed auditorium at the Wax Museum and it soon became famous as 'Castle Dracula'.

In 2002, it was decided that the actual site of the plaque should be in the entrance passage to the building, formerly the Wax Museum, which lies within a courtyard off the Royal Mile in Edinburgh Old Town.

Permission to erect a plaque had to meet with City Council approval and many months were spent in contacting all possible departments and officers within the Council. Finally, permissions were received on the understanding that the proposed plaque was to be of an equal size and quality and placed directly below one already on the site. That existing plaque only gave the history of the building prior to the Wax Museum taking over. That meant the plaque to Charles had to be a piece of cast bronze measuring 15 3/4" wide × 12" deep × 1/2" thick. The cost of the project was quite high, due to the numerous production and installment procedures necessary.

Many of Charles' friends and associates in magic, along with many local 'lay people' friends, sent donations to Alex Wallace, the partner of the late Charles, to help in funding this project.

Before its final fixing, a recess was made at the rear of the plaque so that a document containing all the names of the sponsors could be sealed behind it.

In part of a dedication, Tony Andruzzi (Masklyn ye Mage) wrote in a gift copy of his "The Negromicon of Masklyn ye Mage (1977)" to Charles, "the one who started all this".

In a copy of Anthony Raven's "The Necromantic Grimoire of Augustus Rapp" gifted to Charles, Raven wrote: "To Charles Cameron-a kindred soul who travels the same paths and whose writings inspired this work".

The plaque was unveiled on 10 October 2003, at the launch of the Charles W. Cameron Memorial Gathering, which was held during the weekend of 10, 11 and 12 October in Edinburgh.

== Books ==
As well as a love of books, he has written books as well – to date thirteen, with another five on the stocks. He also wrote The Cauldron (serial pamphlet) which has been recently reproduced by Karl Bartoni for The Magik Club.

=== Published books ===
- Curiosities of Old Edinburgh
- Scottish Witches
- Scottish Witches, Revised and Enlarged Edition
- Handbook of Horror
- Witches' Brew
- Macabre and Mental Mysteries
- Devil's Diary
- Castle Dracula Mentalism
- Mind Your Magic

=== Awaiting publication ===
- Beyond The Unknown
- The Land of Make Believe (a children's story book)

=== Unfinished books ===
- Pardon My Weird Friends (Autobiography)
- Don't Blink-It's Magic
- Castle Dracula
