= Great Ovette =

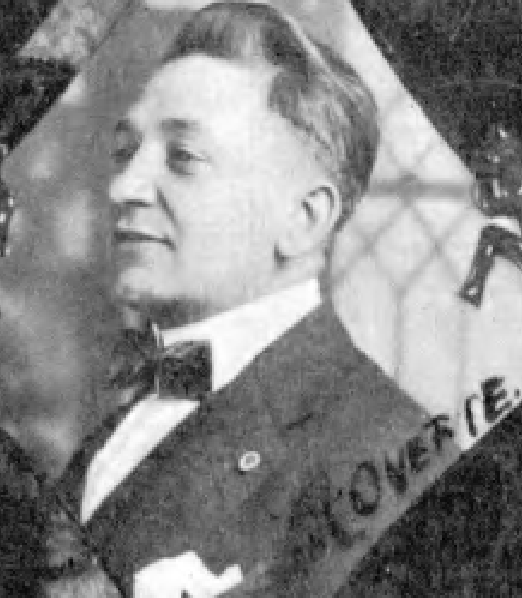
- Born: January 20, 1885
- Died: August 5, 1946 (aged 61)
- Occupation: Magician

Great Ovette (January 20, 1885 – August 5, 1946) also known as Joseph Ovette was an Italian American author and professional magician.

Ovette was born as Giuseppe Olivo, in Naples, Italy. He also performed under the name Lung Chan Yuen and was well known for his hanging illusion act that was advertised as "The Man They Couldn't Hang". He wrote books on magic and contributed to numerous magic magazines.

Ovette performed the "blindfold drive", this consisted of him driving a car blindfolded through the streets of Ottawa.

He died in Buffalo, New York from a throat infection. He was buried in Ontario, Canada.

== Publications ==
- Magician's New Field (1916)
- Trickery Tricks (1917)
- Advanced Magic (1919)
- The Book of Wisdom (1920)
- Bargain Magic (1921)
- Practical Telepathy (1924)
- Publicity Miracles (1928)
- Book of Moses Outdone (1930)
- Silk Creations (1931)
- Kandle Magik (1937)
- Odds and Ends in Cardology (1937)
- Fast Ones (1940)
- Ovette's Tricks and Illusionettes (1944)
- Miraculous Hindu Feats (1947)
