= Tenkatsu Shokyokusai =

Japanese magician (1886–1944)

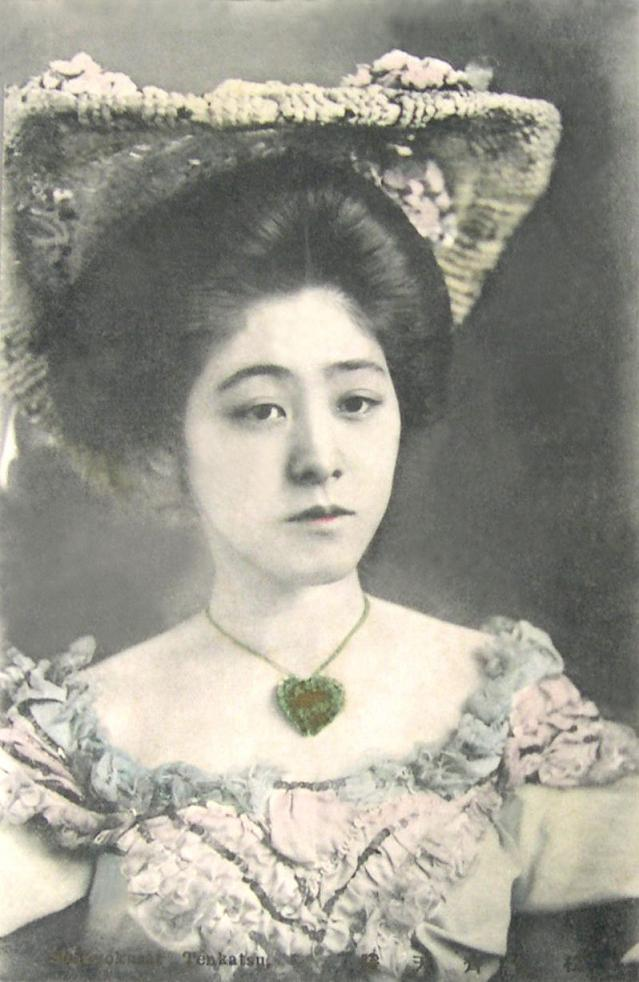
- Tenkatsu Shokyokusai, from a picture postcard.
- Born: Katsu Nakai; 21 May 1886; Tokyo
- Died: 11 November 1944 (aged 58)
- Other name: Madame Tenkatsu
- Occupations: Actress, magician

Tenkatsu Shokyokusai (松旭斎 天勝, 21 May 1886 – 11 November 1944), also known as Katsu Kanazawa, was a Japanese wazuma practitioner and actress.

== Early life ==
Katsu Nakai was born in Tokyo. After her father's pawn-shop business failed, she worked as an apprentice at a tempura shop belonging to then-famous magician Ten'ichi Shokyokusai (1853-1912), of whom she later became an assistant. From 1901 to 1903, they performed on tour in the United States, where teenaged Tenkatsu was described as a "dainty Japanese beauty" and as a geisha. She was sometimes referred to as Tenichi Shokyokusai's wife or widow, or as his stepdaughter, perhaps because of the difference in their ages.

== Career ==
Shokyokusai became a well-known magician in her own right. She headed her own troupe of performers, Tenkatsu Ichiza. The company staged adaptations of Western plays, including Shakespeare's The Tempest and Oscar Wilde's Salome, with herself in the title role. "Madame Tenkatsu" toured with her company in the United States in 1924 and 1925, including shows in Hawaii and at the Hippodrome in New York. She is said to have introduced American jazz to Japan in 1925, when she brought a group of Chicago-based musicians home to tour with her.

Shokyokusai appeared in several films, including Tenkatsujo no Hagoromai (Feather Cloak Dance of Miss Tenkatsu, 1906). She was said to have a diamond embedded in one of her teeth.

== Personal life ==
Shokyokusai retired from the stage in 1936, and she died in 1944, aged 58 years. A biography of Shokyokusai appeared in Japanese in 1968, by Gashō Ishikawa.
