= Jonathan Levit =

American magician (born 1971)

- Born: April 20, 1971 (age 54); Orange, New York, U.S.
- Occupation(s): Magician, actor, theatrical producer
- Website: jonathanlevit.com

Jonathan Levit (born April 20, 1971) is an American magician, actor, television host and theatrical producer. He has appeared in various film and television series, and was the host of VH1's reality television series Celebracadabra. He also performs frequently at the Magic Castle in Hollywood, Los Angeles.

== Early life, education and early career ==
At age three, Levit moved with his family to Iran for several years. During those years, he experienced culture from all over Europe and the world.

At age eight, Levit was bitten by the performing bug. While back in U.S., Levit happened upon some old magic tricks in the basement of his home, which belonged to his father. Levit first set foot on stage to perform his first magic act at age twelve. That same year, Levit appeared on television on The Sally Jessy Raphael Show, along with illusionist David Copperfield as a guest.

Levit continued his training as a magician, studying with some of the top minds in the art, honing his sleight-of-hand and performance skills, at the same time receiving numerous awards in close up, stage and street performing competitions.

While in college at Syracuse University in New York, Levit produced a variety of sold-out shows – on and off campus – during his academic career, casting many performers who have achieved success in the entertainment fields.

Before leaving Syracuse, Levit was sent a note from television sportscaster Bob Costas wrote Levit telling him to "follow your dreams...you can't go wrong". This inspired Levit to move Hollywood.

== Adult career ==
Upon moving to Los Angeles, Levit began training at various acting studios. His first appearance on television was a guest role, opposite Ricky Jay, on an episode of the television series The X-Files in 2000. He has since appeared in roles in television shows and commercial films. He has also traveled the world as a television host.

While at home in Los Angeles, Levit works as an actor, television host and voiceover artist and often performs at the Magic Castle. Here, he has the opportunity to hone his other lifelong passion of performing magic. He says it is this balance of acting and magic that keeps him sharp – "both arts enhance each other".

== Filmography ==
| Year | Film | Role | Other notes |
|---|---|---|---|
| 1999 | Bellyfruit | Roger | |
| 2000 | The X-Files | Billy LaBonge | "The Amazing Maleeni" episode |
| 2000 | The Others | Movie Producer | |
| 2001 | Double Deception | Frank Ford | a.k.a. 24 Hours to Die |
| 2001 | The Huntress | Danny Blaze | "Now You See Him" episode |
| 2002 | Unspeakable | Kenny | |
| 2004 | Michael Blanco | The Manager | |
| 2004 | Miracle Hunters | Himself - Host | TV series |
| 2005 | Val/Val | Trevor | |
| 2006 | The Bold and the Beautiful | Robert - Applicant #2 | Episode #1.4716 |
| 2006 | Wired NextFest | Himself - Host | |
| 2007 | Tortilla Heaven | Dr. Webman | |
| 2007 | Never Say Macbeth | Radio Announcer (voice) | |
| 2007 | Green Wheels | Himself - Host | TV series |
| 2008 | Green With Envy | Himself - Host | TV series (Fine Living) |
| 2008 | Celebracadabra | Himself - Host | TV series (VH1) |
| 2008 | Paranormal U.S.A. | Himself - Host | TV series (Biography) |
| 2008 | War of the Worlds 2: The Next Wave | Yates Gorman | Sequel to The Asylum's adaptation of H. G. Wells' novel The War of the Worlds |
