= Scott Interrante =

American magician (born 1961)

Scott Arbuthnot (born August 4, 1961) is an American magician who specializes in escape-artist feats and grand illusions.

He is a third-generation magician. At 17, Scott answered an audition posting for the movie Ragtime and got the job to re-create Houdini's stunt of escaping from a straitjacket while dangling upside-down over the streets of New York City. He was a protégé of one of world's foremost escapists, James Randi, and joined him for his first world tour, celebrating his 18th birthday in Sydney, Australia. While in Australia, Interrante appeared with James Randi in the film Explorer and assisted in public paranormal challenges in an effort to give away US$100,000 to anyone who could produce such pre-determined paranormal events under fair and supervised conditions. Interrante has won awards from the Society of American Magicians, the International Brotherhood of Magicians and the International Magicians Society.
