= Arnold de Biere =

German magician

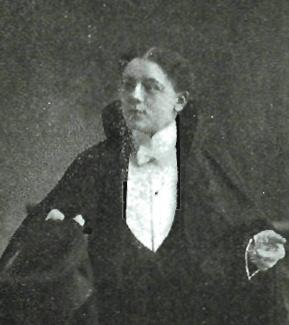
Arnold de Biere

Arnold De Biere (1878 – 6 August 1934) was a German magician.

Biere, who was of Jewish origin, was born in Germany in 1878 and moved to the United States as a child. He spent most of his childhood in Bradford, Pennsylvania, where he developed an interest in magic tricks. He originally worked as a shop keeper, but took interest in magic shows and stage illusions.

Biere became well known in Europe and Australia where he toured. His most well known tricks were the Egg Bag, Clock Dial and the Ten-Ichi Thumb Tie. He also performed the vanishing bird cage act and in the 1920s gave stage illusions at the St. George's Hall. He died in London on August 6, 1934.

Biere had once invested in a movie of Harry Houdini, but lost a considerable amount of money as the film was not a success.

Biere had stated that he had solved the riddle of how to perform the Indian rope trick in open air. A few days before his death he claimed he was going to perform this feat and reveal its secret.
