= Rovi (magician) =

Ivor Parry (known as Rovi) (29 November 1919 – 8 June 1996) was a Welsh magician. He was a Gold Star Medallist of the Inner Magic Circle, was known amongst magicians as The Welsh Wizard and was called 'a British legend' by Opus Magazine. Specialising in card magic, his original creations were published in "Rovi Reveals" as part of the Supreme Magic Teach-in Series by Lewis Ganson. The Rovi Trophy is presented annually for the best card trick at the International Brotherhood of Magicians' British Ring Convention. Parry was born in Caernarfon.
