= Felix Snipes =

American magician

Felix Snipes (December 20, 1933 – June 11, 2010) was a professional magician.

During his performing career, he appeared at venues throughout the United States, often to record-breaking crowds. He was a Reverend and also a member of the First Baptist Church of Atlanta.
