= Karl Germain =

American magician (1878-1959)

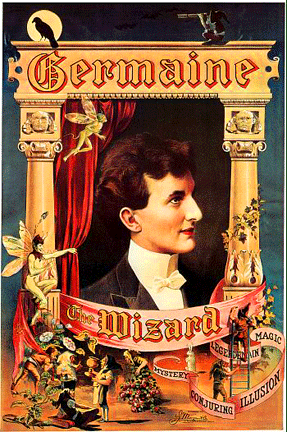
Karl Germain, promotional poster showing an early spelling of his stage name, ca. 1902.

Karl Germain, born Charles Mattmueller, (February 12, 1878 – August 9, 1959) was an American magician and lawyer. He performed under the stage name Germain the Wizard.

== Early history ==
At the age of 8, young Charles Mattmueller presented an impromptu version of the Spirit Cabinet for two schoolmates. Charles was tied with ropes and locked inside a bread cabinet. A short time later, knocks and raps were heard coming from the cabinet frightening the onlookers. It is unknown how Charles with no knowledge of magical principles figured out how to do this, but it began an interest in magic that would last throughout his life. As a teen, he performed under his last name Mattmueller, and then later changed it to Germaine, and eventually Germain. He was a popular artist who worked in the Lyceum and Chautauqua circuits.

== Performing career ==
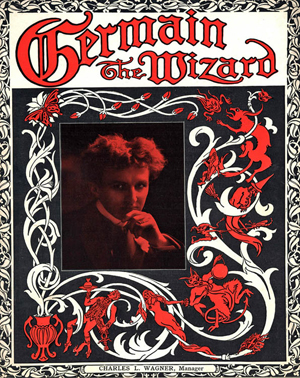
Karl Germain brochure, ca. 1908

Karl Germain performed many classic popular magic effects of his day. What made his performances different from others were his artistic and elegant presentations of these tricks. In time Germain would add his own creations. His flower growth illusion was praised by audiences and magicians alike. Harry Kellar made the trick of magically growing flowers popular, but Germain developed a different method which many claimed was better than the original. Germain was one of the early presenters of mind reading effects in his show. One of his most original creations and the highlight of his show was called Germain's Egyptian Water Jars. Five metal jars were shown empty and then they all miraculously filled with water which was then poured into an aquarium. Since Germain's retirement no magician has ever gained the success or notoriety with this trick.

== Sources ==
- Price, David (1985), Magic: A Pictorial History of Conjurers in the Theater, Cornwall Books, ISBN 0-8453-4738-1
- Christopher, Milbourne & Christopher, Maurine (2005), The Illustrated History of Magic, fwd. David Copperfield, Running Press, ISBN 0-690-43165-1
- Cramer, Stuart (1966), Germain the Wizard and his Legerdemain, Buffum Pub. Corp., ISBN 0-9710405-2-4
