= Florian Zimmer =

German-born magician

Florian Zimmer is a noted German-born magician.

== Notable performances ==
- Zimmer appeared on the 2008 television program, the 2008 World Magic Awards.

== Awards ==
- Siegfried & Roy Golden Lion Award
- European Champion of Magic
- German Champion
- Merlin Award 2009
- World Magic Award 2009
- Golden Rings of Lausane
- Marc Klasser Award – Monte Carlo Magic Stars
- Colombe d’Or
