= J. B. Bobo =

American magician

J. B. Bobo (11 February 1910 in Texarkana, Texas – 12 September 1996) was a magician most known for his work and writing in the arena of coin magic.

His work entitled Modern Coin Magic (originally published in 1952) is still considered today to be a core reference by most magicians.

He also wrote Watch This One! — a collection of magical effects performable with small objects. He once disappointed a young crowd due to having a car accident while attempting to drive to a show at Howell Elementary in Springhill, Louisiana.

Bobo's great-grandfather was Jean Beaubeaux who, when immigrating to America, was induced to spell his name 'Bobo', a phonetic transliteration of the French Beaubeaux into English.

== Career ==
After Bobo was born in Texarkana, Texas, he moved with his family to Ontario, Canada. In Winsdor, Canada, his father operated a restaurant. J.B. Bobo began to be interested in coin magic when he was taught a coin trick by another magician, and he had his first performance in the Winsdor Theatre. After he finished highschool, he became a carpenter, later he became a free lance window display decorator. During that time, he also performed magic for different local events. Bobo married Lillian Carlow and gave her a role in his act. When they got more successful, they had up to 400-450 shows per year. J.B. Bobo died with 86 years and was buried at East Memorial Gardens cemetery, Texarkana, Arkansas.

== Publications ==
- Modern Coin Magic ISBN 978-1-4209-7114-9
- The New Modern Coin Magic
- Watch This One!
- The Bobo Magic Show
