= Dariel Fitzkee =

American magician and writer

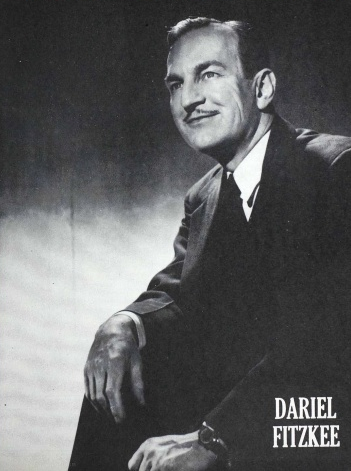
- Occupation: Magician

Dariel Fitzkee (1898–1977) was the pen name of Dariel Fitzroy. He was a magician and writer, born in Annawan, Illinois. His trilogy, known as The Fitzkee Trilogy is considered by many to be an important contribution to the theory of magic.

In his memoir, Born Standing Up, comedian and one-time magician Steve Martin describes Fitzkee's Showmanship for Magicians as "more important to me than The Catcher In The Rye," adding that they were, coincidentally, distant relatives by marriage.

== Publications ==
- Cut and Restored Rope Manipulation (1929)
- Jumbo Card Manipulation (1929)
- Linking Ring Manipulation (1930)
- Misdirection for Magicians (1935)
- Contact Mind Reading Expanded (1935)
- The Strange Inventions of Doctor Ervin (1937)
- Showmanship for Magicians (1943), Lee Jacobs, publisher
- The Only Six Ways To Restore a Rope (1944) Reprinted as Rope Eternal in 1957.
- The Trick Brain (1944), Lee Jacobs, publisher
- Magic by Misdirection (1945), Lee Jacobs, publisher
- Rings in your Fingers (1946)
- The Card Expert Entertains (1948)

The current copyrights for Showmanship for Magicians, The Trick Brain and Magic by Misdirection are held by Fitzkee's daughter, Marcia Dobbs. The books have been reprinted, with permission, in late 2008 by Magic Box Productions.
