= Tony Andruzzi =

American magician (1925–1991)

Tony Andruzzi (May 22, 1925 – December 22, 1991) was the name adopted by professional magician Tom Stewart Palmer from the age of 45 to the end of his life. He was married from 1947 to 1964 to Gloria Jacobsen, also known as Gloria Marcom.

== Biography ==
Born to Fay and Tom McGuire in Cheyenne, Wyoming on May 22, 1925, he was first christened as Timothy McGuire on July 22, 1925. But after Tom McGuire left Fay to raise the boy alone, Fay allowed Charles and Gertie Palmer to adopt the child.

He was rechristened Tom Stewart Palmer on March 29, 1926. His biological mother maintained a friendly relationship with the Palmer family, although did not divulge the nature of her relationship to Tom until his teens. As a performer through the late 1960s, he retained the name of Tom Palmer while specializing in comedy magic. When he moved to Chicago, Illinois, and changed styles to pursue bizarre magic, he adopted the name Tony Andruzzi, both in performance and in daily life.

Andruzzi died in Chicago, Illinois on December 22, 1991, at the age of 66.

== Publications ==
As Tom Palmer:

- Cagey Doves (Chicago: Magic Inc., 1969)
- The Comedy Act of and by Tom Palmer (Chicago: Magic Inc., 1969)
- The Famous Flea Act (Chicago: Magic Inc., 1962)
- Modern Illusions (Chicago: Magic Inc., 1959)
- The Tie Pitch (Chicago: Magic Inc., 1960)
- The Vampira Act (Chicago: Magic Inc., 1961)

As Tony Andruzzi:

- Compleat Invocation, Volumes 1 and 2 (co-edited with Tony Raven) (Washington, D.C.: Kaufman and Company, 1986)
- Compleat Invocation, Volume 3 (Washington, D.C.: Kaufman and Company, 1992)
- Tony Andruzzi's Magazine Memory Act (Albuquerque: Flora and Company)

As Masklyn ye Mage:

- The Negromicon of Masklyn ye Mage (Chicago: Self Published, 1977)
- Grimoire of the Mages (Chicago: Self Published, 1980)
- Daemon's Diary (Chicago: Self Published, 1982)
- The Legendary Scroll of Masklyn ye Mage (Chicago: Self Published, 1983)

== Conventions ==
As an outgrowth of his editorship of New Invocation, a periodical for performers of bizarre magic, Andruzzi organized and presented conventions for magicians supportive of this genre.

Called Invocationals, they were held annually in Chicago from 1984 to 1990. Each Invocational revolved around performances, educational seminars, and socializing, while also paying tribute to a specific member of the bizarre-magic community.

Honorees included:

- Charles Cameron (1984)
- T.A. Waters (1985)
- Max Maven (1986)
- Stephen Minch (1987)
- Ross Johnson (1988)
- Tony "Doc" Shiels (1989)
- Eugene Burger (1990)

== Sources ==
- Unspeakable Acts: Three Lives and Countless Legends of Tom Palmer/Tony Andruzzi/Masklyn ye Mage. Jim Magus with Terry Nosek and Neil Tobin (Lulu.com, 2011).
