= Murray SawChuck =

Canadian magician

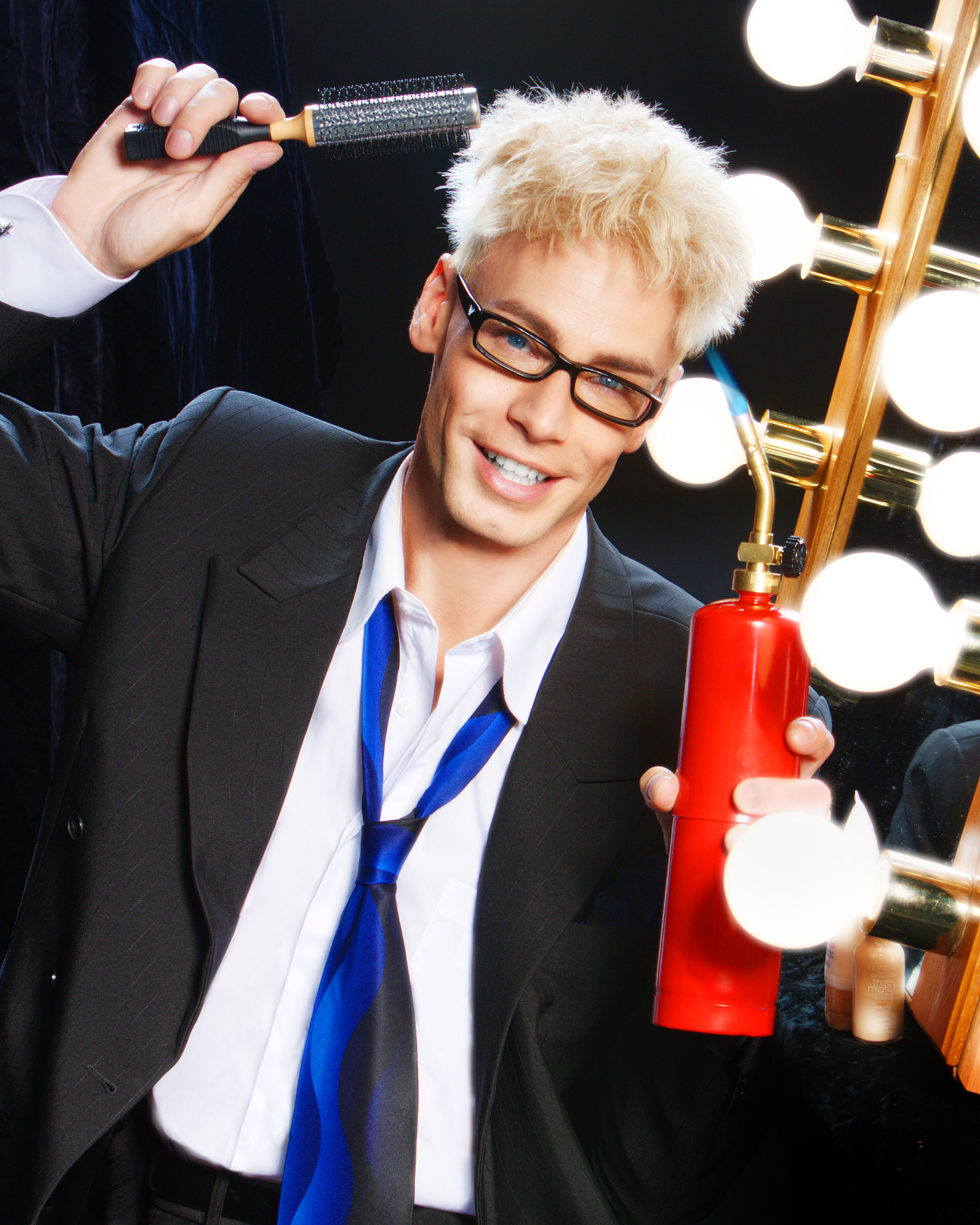
- Murray SawChuck
- Born: November 25, 1973 (age 52); Burnaby, British Columbia, Canada
- Spouses: Chloe Louise Crawford (m. 2012; div. 2015) Dani Elizabeth (m. 2021)
- Website: MurrayMagic.com

Murray John Sawchuck (born November 25, 1973, stage name Murray SawChuck) is a Canadian stage illusionist, magician, comedian, actor, and host. Based in Las Vegas, SawChuck has dubbed himself "The 'Dennis the Menace' of Magic," and his shows often consist of a blend of "comical mishaps" that result in illusions and magic tricks. He was featured in the fifth season of America's Got Talent, and is the resident magic historian on Pawn Stars. SawChuck has also appeared as a magic coach on five episodes of the VH1 series Celebracadabra, and has been a guest star on shows such as Reno 911!, Last Comic Standing, Celebrity Blind Date, War of the Worlds 2: The Next Wave, and Ring of Darkness.

In 2018, Las Vegas Mayor Carolyn Goodman surprised SawChuck with a proclamation that declared November 25 Murray the Magician Day. SawChuck had a resident show at the Tropicana Hotel and regularly having tours worldwide.

== Early life ==
Murray John Sawchuck was born in Burnaby, British Columbia to John and Arlene Sawchuck. His father and extended family have a history of working with railways and trains for over 150 years. His father was also a musician and played in bands when Sawchuck was young, and he has cited that musical exposure as an influence on his later showmanship. Sawchuck began learning accordion, keyboard and saxophone at age five. He learned Ukrainian dancing at age five as well, and at age seven began taking dance lessons in a variety of genres. He was also active in sports.

At age seven, his aunt and uncle gave him a Siegfried and Roy magic kit. SawChuck, who then idolized entertainers such as Dean Martin, Johnny Carson, Lucille Ball, Danny Kaye and Phyllis Diller, began working on incorporating magic, music and dance into routines. He performed his first paid show at a birthday party when he was 11 years old. As a teenager, Sawchuck has stated he did five to six kid's shows a week for six years, often incorporating dancing, accordion and saxophone. He also worked over 21 jobs, including busboy, lifeguard and fixing bicycles. He graduated from high school and received a college degree in Broadcast Communications and Journalism.

== Early career ==
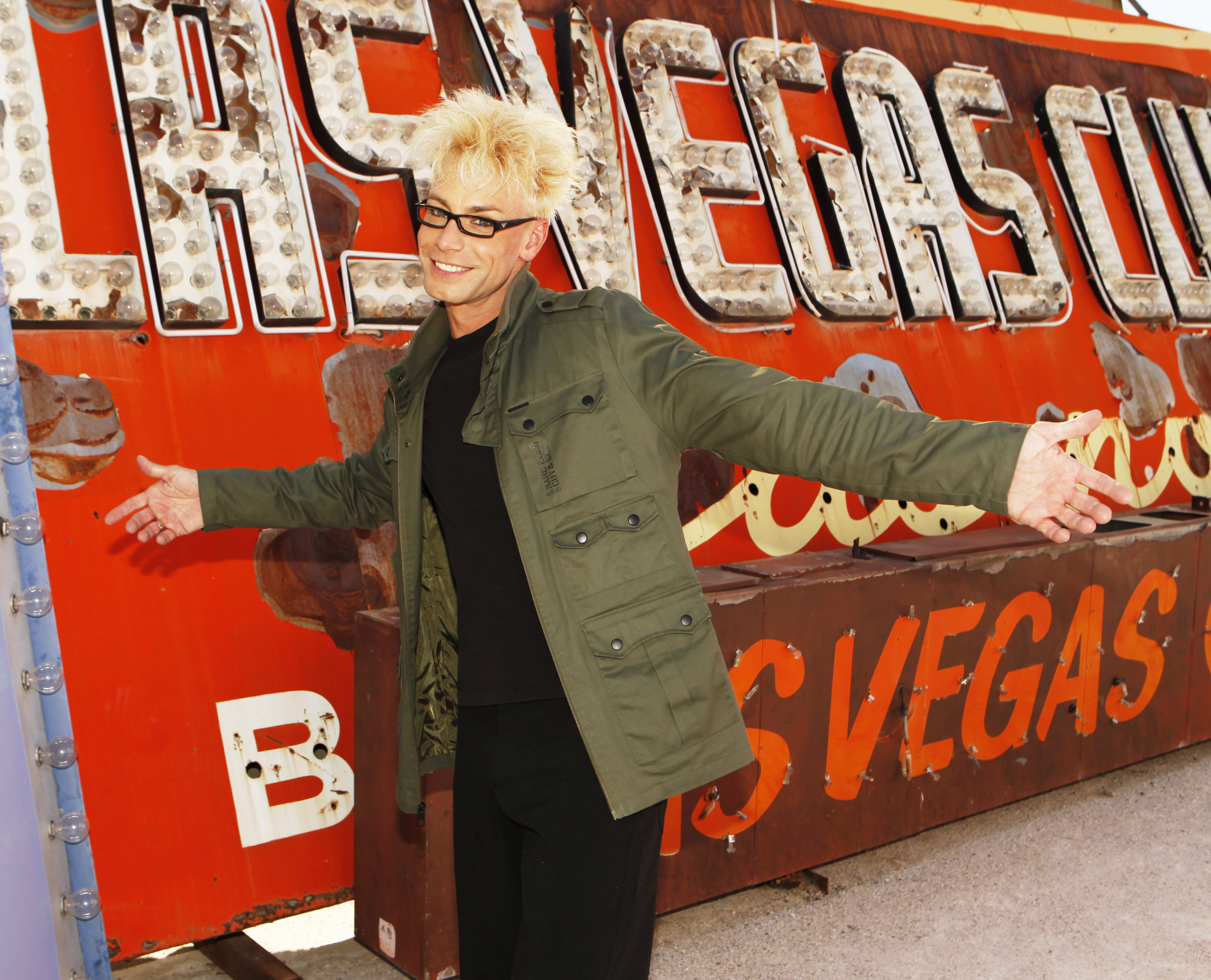
SawChuck in 2011 at the Las Vegas Neon Museum

SawChuck soon met Marvyn and Carol Roy, also known as "Mr. Electric." The couple, who had toured worldwide as magicians for over 50 years, mentored Sawchuck. He began performing in Europe, with his first show in Brussels, Belgium. He has stated that one of his biggest breaks was performing Paris, France on the Le Plus Grand Cabaret du Monde, a television show that aired across Europe. He also performed in Monaco, Monte Carlo, and throughout Europe. Between touring he lived for some time in Orlando, Florida. After a tour of Canada he moved to Las Vegas, headlining on the Las Vegas Strip. He also toured in South Asia, including Singapore, Thailand, Malaysia, Vietnam, and Hong Kong. Murray was also under contract with Norwegian Cruise Lines for the summer of 2008 performing his trademark CD act on the Norwegian Star on the Alaska run.

In 1999, he was named "Magic Champion" at the Pacific Rim Professional Magic Challenge. SawChuck has won over 24 awards, and at one point received the title of "World Champion." He was purportedly the first magician to invent a professional magic act involving the manipulation of multiple CDs.

SawChuck became a US citizen in 2009. SawChuck began performing in the Las Vegas show Fantasy at the Luxor around 2020. SawChuck said that when he visited Las Vegas, it had been the inaugural show he had attended. He described his 15-minute performance as being lower pressure compared to his typical one-hour shows. SawChuck was assisted by Dani Elizabeth, a showgirl. He was a periodic entertainer on the show until 2023 when the comedian act was cut from Fantasy.

== Television appearances ==
=== Celebracadabra ===
Sawchuck appeared as a magic coach on five episodes of the 2008 VH1 series Celebracadabra, where magician and celebrity pairs competed for a prize and title of "Best Celebrity Magician." He was teamed up with Kimberly Wyatt of the Pussycat Dolls.

=== America's Got Talent ===
In late summer of 2010, Sawchuck was featured on the fifth season of the NBC show America's Got Talent. Judges Piers Morgan, Sharon Osbourne, and Howie Mandel voted him on into the semi-finals, and at one point he received a standing ovation from Osbourne. Among the illusions he performed for the show were producing a car from thin air, and transforming a woman locked in a cage into a live tiger, then having the woman re-appear next to the judges. He also disappeared a 1918 steam locomotive. The train trick was an homage to Sawchuck's long family history in the train industry. Reviews for his appearances were positive, with About.com saying "Murray seemingly did everything right. He successfully managed to ramp-up the magic and impact as he rose through the eliminations - something that earlier magicians haven't been able to do."

=== Pawn Stars ===
The History Channel series Pawn Stars regularly features Sawchuck as the resident historian for antique magic devices. He also hosts the live Pawn Stars tour events that travel to various cities.

=== The Jadagrace Show ===
As of May 2011, Sawchuck had filmed a role as "Murray the Magician" in the tween series The Jadagrace Show. The series will star 11-year-old Jadagrace Barry, who appeared in Terminator Salvation, and Sawchuck's comedic role is recurring throughout five episodes.

=== GLOW ===
In season 3, episode 4 of GLOW titled "Say Yes", SawChuck appeared as Steve Mills, a magician hired by Bash to spice up the show.

=== Masters of Illusion ===
SawChuck performed in the duo 'Lefty and Murray SawChuck' in season 6, episode 9 of Masters of Illusion titled Perishing Piano, Mesmerizing Minds & a Little Red Ball. The show aired on August 9, 2019, and included performances by Jarret and Raja, Jeki Yoo, Ed Alonzo, Titou, Jason Andrews and The Evasons.

=== Guest appearances ===
He has also guest-starred on Reno 911!, NBCs Last Comic Standing, Celebrity Blind Date, War of the Worlds 2: The Next Wave, the Jerry Lewis Telethon, a number of news channels, Blind Date, Stars of Magic, and Ring of Darkness. He appeared on the 7/20/2014 episode of ABC's Wipeout, eliminated after placing 13th in the qualifying round. He most recently appeared on an episode of Ryan's Mystery Playdate on Nickelodeon in 2019.

== Style ==
SawChuck has dubbed himself "The 'Dennis the Menace' of Magic," and his shows largely consist of a blend of "comical mishaps" that result in illusions. He has named his favorite professional magician as Cardini, who performed in the early 1900s.

According to SawChuck, "I think we've [magicians] dropped the ball a bit on originality and keeping magic real and not edited on TV. I think that future magic needs to be smarter than the audience and right now it isn't." While SawChuck occasionally works with wild animals on stage, he does not own the animals himself, instead working with the animals' owners.
