= Lu Chen (magician) =

Taiwanese magician

Lu Chen 劉謙
- Born: June 25, 1976 (age 49); Kaohsiung, Taiwan
- Occupation: Magician
- Height: 1.73 m (5 ft 8 in)
- Website: LuChen Magic

"Magic - It's an amazing psychological phenomenon."

— Lu Chen

Lu "Louis" Chen (Chinese: 劉謙; pinyin: Liú Qiān; Wade–Giles: Liu Ch'ien; Pe̍h-ōe-jī: Lâu Khiam; born June 25, 1976) is a Taiwanese magician and is credited to be the only Taiwanese magician to perform in Hollywood's Magic Castle, commonly referred to as China's most renowned magician. Lu Chen has worked in television industry for over 20 years and has been considered as an iconic magic figure in the Chinese world. His TV shows has been seen by more than a billion viewers in Asia. In 2011 he was awarded “The Magician of The Year” by The Academy of Magician Arts. He graduated from Soochow University with a degree in Japanese literature.

Lu Chen has made multiple appearances internationally, performing in Japan, South Korea, Europe, the United States, and Australia. His first public appearance in the mainland China was in 2009, during CCTV's annual Spring Festival, performing a close-range three-part magic show, which included "teleporting" an engagement ring into a real egg. Guests were invited to try basic magic after the show was over.

He has been the recipient of many international awards, including the famed "Neil Foster/Bill Baird Award for Excellence in Manipulation", which is handed out yearly by the Chavez College of Magic.

== Early life and magical career ==
Lu Chen first became interested in magic at the age of 7 when he was attracted by a magic shop while shopping with his aunt. He proceeded to enter and saw the shopkeeper make coins disappear, and when confronted, the shopkeeper pulled a lollipop from behind his ear. From then, he began working on his magic skills, and at the age of 12, he won Taiwan's Youth Magic Contest, which was judged by world-famous magician David Copperfield. In an interview, Lu Chen said that "This win was profoundly meaningful for me. It encouraged me to carry on my magic show dream. It showed me that my efforts could eventually lead to success."

Despite this, Lu Chen did not expect to become a professional magician, instead choosing to study the Japanese language at Soochow University, while practicing amateur magic in his spare time. His failure to find a job after graduation forced him to pursue a career in magic. In 2001, Lu Chen expanded his magic shows onto television, starting a show called "Magic Star", quickly becoming STAR Chinese Channel's's most popular show. In 2003, he took first place at the international World Magic Seminar. From 2007 to 2009, Lu Chen has been performing and judging on the magic segment of the Chang Fei's popular Taiwanese variety show, Variety Big Brother.

His plans to pursue magic in China were fulfilled when he performed "Magic Hands" at CCTV New Year's Gala 2009 in front of a live audience and while one billion people watched the televised broadcast. His performance was the second most popular show that night, surpassed only by Zhao Benshan's skit. After his performance at the CCTV New Year's Gala, various provincial channels (most commonly Jiangsu TV, Shanghai Media Group and Hunan TV) offer an invitation for him to perform. He has also appeared in Chinese television commercials throughout 2009. He performed again the following year at CCTV New Year's Gala 2010 and CCTV Lantern Festival's Gala 2010.

After his debut in China, he mainly appears in China and Japan for his performances. In 2010, he was awarded the Merlin Award, his 26th magic award for his career. In 2011, Lu Chen became the first Asian magician to have his own stage performance at Las Vegas and the first Taiwanese magician to be published in the American MAGIC magazine. Today, many consider Lu Chen to be Asia's David Copperfield due to his high fame and popularity especially in Asia.

== Awards and accomplishments ==
- Neil Foster/Bill Baird Award for Excellence in Manipulation (Chavez College of Magic)
- Best Practices Award (Society of American Magicians)
- Taiwan's Youth Magic Contest (1st place), award was personally presented by David Copperfield
- 1998 S.A.M. JAPAN Competition (美國魔術師協會日本分會)
- 1998 “Formosa International Magic Convention - Best Creativity Award
- 2000 Naniwa International Magic Convention – First Prize Award in stage magic Category JCMA Special Award
- "The Best Closeup Magician Award of the Year" (Japanese Magic Convention)
- 2003 Japan Professional Magician Association - Magician of the Year World Magic Seminar Asia - Grand Prix
- 2005 CHAVEZ Magic Academy- Neil Foster Award-Excellence in Manipulation Abbott's Magic Get-together - People's Choice Award
- 中國吳橋國際藝術節銅獅獎
- 上海國際魔術藝術節銀牌獎
- Abbott's Magic Get-together
- 2003 World Magic Seminar (1st place)
- 2008 日本近距离魔术协会JAPAN CUP「年度最佳近距离魔术师」(Close-Up magician of the Year)
- 2009 CCTV Spring Festival Evening Gala Best Act Award in music and performing arts category
- 2009 时尚先生盛典「2009年度时尚先生」
- 2010 CCTV Spring Festival Evening Gala Best Act Award in music and performing arts category
- 2010 梅林奬 Merlin Award (IMS, International Magicians Society)
- 2011 5th Annual National People's Congress and Entrepreneur Forum – “Socially Responsible Artist” award
- 2011 Fédération Internationale des Sociétés Magiques (FISM) & The Academy of the Magical Arts (AMA) - Asian Magician of the Year
- 2012 Magician of the Year “Magician of the Year 2011” (The Academy of Magical Arts) 年度魔术师
- 2013 The “Grolla d'oro award” one of the most ancient award in the history of European movies and arts industry
- 2013 The International Magic Award 2013

== Publications ==
- Ah! I'm Lose by Magic!. Ko Po International Ltd. 2005. ISBN 986-7323-18-1.
- Ah! I'm Lose by Magic! Part 2. Ko Po International Ltd. 2005. ISBN 986-7323-62-9.
- Magic Visa. Ko Po International Ltd. 2006. ISBN 986-7088-87-5.
- Men Who Learn Magic: 30 Tricks That Can Change Your Life. Ko Po International Ltd. 2008. ISBN 978-986-185-198-3.

== See also ==
- List of Academy of Magical Arts Award Winners
