= Rocco Silano =

American magician, author, and lecturer (born 1962)

- Born: 1959 or 1960; Paterson, New Jersey
- Occupation(s): magician, author, lecturer

Rocco Silano is an American magician, author, and lecturer.

== Biography ==
Silano was born c. 1960, in Paterson, New Jersey. Early on in his career, Rocco studied with and was managed by sleight-of-hand expert and Tony Slydini protégé Bill Wisch. Silano studied with Wisch for at least 4 months in 1980, when Wisch taught him many Slydini routines, including Slydini's cigarette production. “For the last four months Silano has taken private lessons from Bill Wisch, the successor to Slydini, the famous 83-year-old magician, Slydini, who is “one of the best” according to Silano, does not teach anymore. One of the routines Silano has learned from Wisch is Slydini's cigarette production routine known as “poetry in magic” according to Silano." Later, Rocco was introduced to Slydini by Bill and Rocco took lessons with Slydini as well. Rocco stated in an interview with the Wise Guyz Radio Show on May 1, 2019, "He (Bill Wisch) hooked me up with Tony Slydini. He was a student before I was with Slydini and he introduced me to him." In 1988, he invented a gable-top milk carton that could be more easily collapsed for disposal by removing a tear strip at the bottom of the carton.

Most known for his sleeving techniques and skill, Silano is the recipient of the Merlin and Golden Lion Awards, a two-time winner of the coveted Manhattan Association of Cabarets Award, and has been nominated nine times as Magician of the Year by the Academy of Magical Arts in four different categories.

Silano is the only American to win awards at two FISM World Tournaments: 3rd place in Micromagic in 1994 in Yokohama, Japan, and "Most Original Act" in 2006 in Stockholm, Sweden. Silano performed at the 2007 Austrian Magic Convention in Vienna, Austria, and appeared in the VH1 celebrity magic reality series, Celebracadabra, in 2008, as an adviser and guide for celebrity partner and 1st runner-up, Hal Sparks.

== Bibliography ==
- The Winning Edge: The Lecture of a Champion, with Bill Wisch, 1987
- If it fits...Sleeve it!, with Steve Schneiderman, 1990 ASIN B000NO7YZ2
- A Lesson in Sleeving
