= Curtis Adams (magician) =

American magician

Alan Curtis Adams is an American magician who, when 16 years old, appeared on The Young Magicians Showcase produced by magician Lance Burton and Fox Television.

Adams was born in Long Beach, California. In his teens he began his own production company and became one of the youngest magicians to perform in Reno, Nevada casinos. He graduated from high school a year early, at the age of 17, to pursue his career with Creative Director Don Wayne, best known for creating and producing material for David Copperfield's TV specials.

In 2006 Curtis Adams was the headliner in the main showroom of The Plaza Hotel and Casino in Las Vegas. In 2007 he launched a national tour of his Las Vegas production "Curtis Adams - Magic That Rocks".

Adams' shows incorporate hip hop dance, pop music, comedy and motorcycle stunts.
