= Simon Lovell =

English magician, actor and card sharp

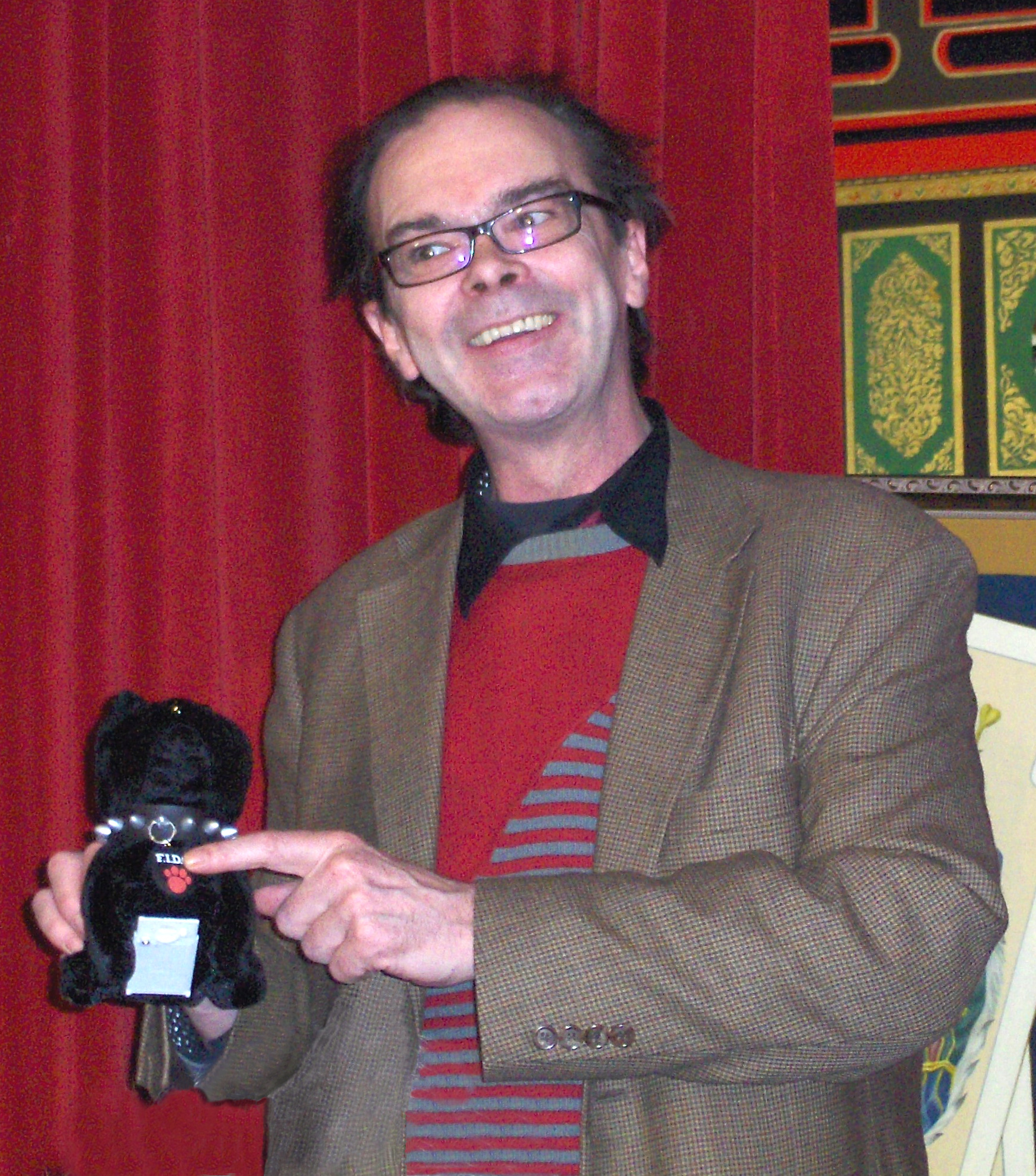
- Born: 1957 (age 68–69); Manchester, England
- Occupation: Magician

Simon Lovell (born 1957) is an English comedy magician, actor, and card sharp, who specialises in magic using playing cards.

== Career ==
Lovell was a regular performer in Monday Night Magic, an off-Broadway show featuring magicians and related performers. He also appeared in the one-man off-Broadway show Strange and Unusual Hobbies, which combined humor with card and magic tricks, and ran for eight years at the SoHo Playhouse.

He was a consultant con man for Matt Bomer in the show White Collar.

In 1987, Lovell appeared performing a magic trick in series one of ChuckleVision. Other TV appearances include VH1 reality show Celebracadabra, on which he and other magicians trained celebrities to perform magic tricks.

He appeared in the 1988 BBC Children in Need telethon.

Lovell has written 16 books, including How to Cheat at Everything: A Con Man Reveals the Secrets of the Esoteric Trade of Cheating, Scams, and Hustles (first published as Billion Dollar Bunko).

He appeared as the devil in the short film Redemption in 2013.

In October 2013 Lovell suffered a severe multiple break to his right femur, requiring surgical implantation of titanium rods and two-and-a-half months of hospital care.

== Books ==
- Lovell, Simon (2006). How to Cheat at Everything: A Con Man Reveals the Secrets of the Esoteric Trade of Cheating, Scams, and Hustles. Running Press. p. 560 pages. ISBN 1-56025-973-6.
- Lovell, Simon (2000). The Son of Simon Says! More of the Close-up Magic of Simon Lovell. L&L Publishing. p. 197 pages. ASIN B000WU8WVW.
- Lovell, Simon (1997). Simon Says! The Close-Up Magic of Simon Lovell. L&L Publishing. p. 247 pages. ASIN B0006RTB4S.
