= International Magicians Society =

Magic society created by Tony Hassini

The International Magicians Society (IMS) is a magic society created by Tony Hassini to "help promote and preserve the art of magic and provide a format where magicians could share their secrets and ideas." The society gives its own "Merlin Award" to magicians on a regular basis, though this award is recognized in the wider community, its authenticity has been questioned, and critics allege that the award can increase publicity.

== History ==
The IMS claims on its website that it was founded in 1968, though this date has been questioned, and asserted to actually be 1994.

== The Merlin Award ==
The IMS website also claims that the Merlin Award statuette, designed by Hassini, was created in 1964 by Carol Michaud, a New York University art student. Though the IMS site claims that the Merlin Award is the Academy Award of Magic, critics allege that it lacks much of the oversight that enhances the credibility of awards in other industries.

Illusionist Morgan Strebler blogged that he received a Merlin Award in 2011. Also in 2011, the Indian paper The Hindu wrote that magician Gopinath Muthukad was the second Indian magician to receive the award. In 2013, illusionist Cosentino was written up in the Tasmanian Times for receiving one.

The distribution of Merlin Awards to virtually unknown magicians in relatively remote areas of the world has drawn scrutiny. Many prominent magicians within the industry, as well as industry journalists, have now questioned the authenticity of the award.
