= Juliana Chen =

Chinese-born magician

- 陈智玲
- Born: Hunan, China
- Occupations: Magician; Illusionist
- Years active: 1984–present
- Website: julianachen.com

Juliana Chen (Chinese: 陈智玲; pinyin: Chén Zhìlíng) is a Chinese-born magician and illusionist known for her card manipulation act. Born in Hunan, China, she trained as a dancer and acrobat before turning to magic, and was named "Best Magician of China" in 1985. She immigrated to Vancouver, Canada, in 1988 and moved to Las Vegas in 2001.

After winning a series of competitions in Canada, the United States and Europe in the 1990s, Chen won a gold medal at the 1997 FISM World Championship of Magic in Dresden, Germany. She was the first woman, and the first magician of Chinese heritage, to win gold at FISM, an achievement that earned her the nickname "the First Lady of Magic". A 2000 profile in The Linking Ring, published by the International Brotherhood of Magicians, was titled "World Champion Manipulator", and she appeared on the cover of the same issue.

In addition to performing, Chen has worked as a producer, festival director and competition judge, and has been involved in cultural exchange between the Chinese and international magic communities. She became an official professional judge of the FISM World Championship of Magic in 2015. In May 2026 she was a month-long resident artist at The Magic Castle in Hollywood, where the Academy of Magical Arts named her its producer and ambassador.

== Early life and training ==
Chen was born and raised in Hunan, China, where she trained in ballet at the Hunan Academy of Arts. She joined the Hunan Dance Troupe and later the Hunan Acrobatic Troupe, where she specialised in foot juggling. After a knee injury ended her acrobatic career, she turned to magic.

== Career ==
=== China and move to Canada (1984–1990) ===
In 1984 Chen joined the Guangzhou Acrobatic Troupe and began to concentrate fully on magic. In 1985 she was named "Best Magician of China".

Chen immigrated to Vancouver, Canada, in 1988, and in 1990 she won a gold medal at the British Columbia Magic Competition.

=== Competition success and FISM championship (1990–1997) ===
In 1992 Chen won a gold medal at the International Brotherhood of Magicians (IBM) International Magic Competition and received the "Stage Magician of the Year" award at the IBM annual convention in Salt Lake City. In 1996 she won a silver medal at the German International Magic Competition and the Grand Prix at Spain's national magic congress.

In 1997 Chen won a gold medal at the FISM World Championship of Magic, held at the World Congress of Magicians in Dresden, Germany. She became the first woman, and the first magician of Chinese heritage, to win gold with a solo act in the competition's history, an achievement that led to her billing as "the First Lady of Magic". Following the championship she was featured on the covers of magic magazines and made television appearances, including the NBC special The World's Greatest Magic IV, a profile on the CBC current-affairs program the fifth estate, and the ABC special Champions of Magic.

=== Las Vegas and international career (2001–present) ===
Chen moved to Las Vegas in 2001 to continue her international career. She was inducted into the Society of American Magicians Hall of Fame and Museum and won "Merlin Awards" from the International Magicians Society for Best Female Magician in 2001 and for Most Original Act in 2003. She was nominated for Stage Magician of the Year by the Academy of Magical Arts in 2002, 2003 and 2023, and in 2023 received the academy's Performing Fellowship Award. She was also the subject of a four-page cover story in the Canadian magazine Saturday Night.

In 2006 Chen was named one of the "100 Most Influential Chinese in British Columbia", and her story was included in Canadian school textbooks. Her later honours include a "Lifetime Achievement Award" in Hollywood in 2024, induction into a Magic Academy Hall of Fame in Tokyo in 2024, and an International Magicians Society Merlin Award Hall of Fame in 2025. In May 2026 she served as a month-long resident artist at The Magic Castle, and the Academy of Magical Arts named her its producer and ambassador.

== Producing, judging and advocacy ==
Chen has also worked as a producer and director. From 1995 she served as a director of the Shanghai International Magic Festival, and she later worked as an artistic director at a theatre in Athens, Greece, in 2016 and 2017. She also performed card magic at China's Ministry of Culture Spring Festival Gala in 1995.

She has been active in connecting the Chinese and international magic communities. She helped the China Acrobats Association establish the first IBM chapter (Ring 311) in China in 1993 and facilitated the association's early contacts with FISM. She has directed competition acts for other performers, including "Magic Space" by Yang Xiaolei of the Tianjin Acrobatic Troupe and "Pigeon Magic" by Ding Yang of the Nantong Acrobatic Troupe, which won the Silver Award and the Best Original Award at the FISM World Championship, the first time a Chinese act had won the latter. In 2020 she helped the China Acrobats Association launch the "Blooming Golden Chrysanthemum" China Magic Show, with events in Las Vegas and Italy. She is recognised as a top talent instructor by China's Ministry of Culture. Chen became an official professional judge of the FISM World Championship of Magic in 2015.

== Performing style and signature acts ==
Chen is best known for card manipulation, and developed a "card-shooting" (card-throwing) technique. Her repertoire also includes a mask-changing and card routine ("Mask & Card"), the Linking rings, and illusions she calls the "Gypsy Rope" and the "Floating Lantern". An NBC special described her act as combining "Eastern artistry and Western showmanship".

She has performed in variety theatres internationally, including the London Palladium, the Princess Grace Theatre in Monte Carlo, Caesars Palace in Las Vegas, the Tiger Palast in Frankfurt, the NHK Theatre in Tokyo, the Berlin Wintergarten, the Friedrichsbau Varieté in Stuttgart and the GOP Theater in Münster.

== Television and media ==
Chen has appeared on television in several countries. Networks that have broadcast her performances or features include NBC, ABC and Fox in the United States; CTV, the CBC and Fairchild TV in Canada; and ITV, NHK, WDR, CCTV, Jiangsu Satellite TV, Asia Television, Chile's national television and Portugal's ETV internationally. Programmes featuring her have included the NBC series The World's Greatest Magic, the ABC special Champions of Magic, the MDA Telethon's Masters of Magic (2009), the documentary The Asian Expats and Successful Asians Abroad, a feature broadcast by Singapore Satellite TV. In 2026 she made a television appearance in Galicia, Spain.

She has been featured in magic and general-interest magazines including Genii—whose January 2026 issue featured her on its cover—The Linking Ring, Magic, the German Magische Welt, the Italian Qui Magia, Magicseen, Canada's Saturday Night and the Chinese-language World Journal Weekly (世界周刊), which has billed her as the "Magic Queen" (魔術皇后).

== Awards and honours ==
| Year | Organisation / event | Honour |
|---|---|---|
| 1985 | All-China magic competition | Best Magician of China |
| 1990 | British Columbia Magic Competition | Gold medal |
| 1992 | International Brotherhood of Magicians | Gold medal; Stage Magician of the Year (Salt Lake City) |
| 1996 | German International Magic Competition | Silver medal |
| 1996 | Spain national magic congress | Grand Prix |
| 1997 | FISM World Championship of Magic, Dresden | Gold medal (card manipulation) |
| 2001 | Society of American Magicians | Hall of Fame and Museum induction |
| 2001 | International Magicians Society | Merlin Award – Best Female Magician |
| 2003 | International Magicians Society | Merlin Award – Most Original Act |
| 2002, 2003, 2023 | Academy of Magical Arts | Stage Magician of the Year (nominations) |
| 2006 | British Columbia | Named one of the "100 Most Influential Chinese in British Columbia" |
| 2023 | Academy of Magical Arts | Performing Fellowship Award |
| 2024 | Hollywood | Lifetime Achievement Award |
| 2024 | Magic Academy (Tokyo) | Hall of Fame induction |
| 2025 | International Magicians Society | Merlin Award Hall of Fame |
