= Lewis Ganson =

English magician

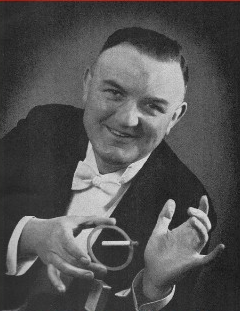
- Born: Lewis Jack Ganson; 1913; West Ham, Essex, England
- Died: 22 December 1980 (aged 66–67); Hampshire, England
- Occupation: Professional magician
- Known for: Sleight of Hand, card magic, coin magic

Lewis Jack Ganson (1913 – 22 December 1980) was an English magician who became one of the most prolific writers in magic, going on to write and edit more than sixty books on the subject.

== Career ==
For years, he was the editor of Harry Stanley's The Gen and contributor to Magigram magazines. He was also a vice president of the British Ring of the International Brotherhood of Magicians and founder member of the Portsmouth and district magic circle.

Ganson was a professional close-up magician except for his time in the Royal Army Ordnance Corps 1939–1958.

== Published works ==
- Expert Manipulation of Playing Cards (1948)
- How Right You Are (1948)
- Routined Manipulation, Vol. 1 (1950)
- Routined Manipulation, Vol. 2 (1952)
- Routined Manipulation Finale (1954)
- A Magician Explains (1955)
- Unconventional Magic (1956)
- Cy Enfield's Entertaining Card Magic (part I, II and III – 1955–1958)
- Dai Vernon Book of Magic (1957)
- Dai Vernon's Cups and Balls (1958)
- Dai Vernon's Symphony of the Rings (1958)
- Vernon's Inner Secrets of Card Magic (1959)
- Vernon's More Inner Secrets of Card Magic (1960)
- The Magic of Slydini (1960)
- Magic of the Mind (1960)
- Vernon's More Secrets of Card Magic (1960)
- Vernon's Further Secrets of Card Magic (1961)
- Dai Vernon's Tribute to Nate Leipzig (1963)
- Malini and his Magic (1963)
- Ron Macmillan's Symphony of the Spheres (1963)
- Marconick's Silk Magic (1964)
- Give a Magician Enough Rope (1966)
- Vernon's Ultimate Secrets of Card Magic (1967)
- Art of Close-up, The Vol. 1 (1966)
- Art of Close-up, The Vol. 2 (1966)
- Card Magic by Manipulation (1971)
- Reelistic Magic (1972)
- Mini Slate Magic (1973)
- Magic with Faucett Ross (1975)
- Immaculate Card Magic of Walt Lees (1975)
- Fan Finale (1975)
- Ganson Teach-In Series (1977–1987)
- Tiny Trio (1978)
- Three Little Words (1978)
- The Magic of Frederica (1981)
- The Ganson Book (1982)
- The Essential Dai Vernon (2009)
- The Complete Ganson Teach-In Series (2010)

== Awards and honors ==
- Magic Castle Academy of Magical Arts' first Literary Fellowship in 1968.

== See also ==
- List of magicians
- Card magic
- Coin magic
- Sleight of hand
