= John Mulholland (magician) =

American stage magician (1898–1970)

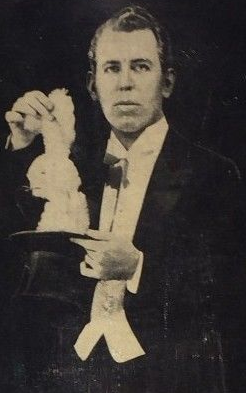
- Born: 9 June 1898; Chicago, Illinois
- Died: 25 February 1970 (aged 71); New York City
- Occupation: Magician

John Mulholland (born John Wickizer) (9 June 1898 in Chicago, Illinois – 25 February 1970 in New York City) was an American magician, author, publisher and intelligence agent.

== Early life ==
Mulholland was born on June 9, 1898, in Chicago, Illinois. His parents were John and Irene Wickizer. While still at school Mulholland started his professional magic career from 1913. He was educated at Columbia University and College of the City of New York. Mulholland supplemented his income by teaching industrial arts at Horace Mann School during 1919–1925.

== Life and work ==
Mulholland learned the art of magic as a teenager with John William Sargent, President of the Society of American Magicians. Mulholland was a professional magician for two decades, working in small companies and large stage shows. He ran one of the first magic workshops and was from 1930 the editor of the magical trade magazine The Sphinx. He published many books on magic and its history.

Mulholland was a close friend of Harry Houdini. Mulholland asserted that "Houdini once told me that he considered no man to be a magician until he was able skillfully to perform the cups and balls."

His other friends included Gene Tunney, Harold Ross and Bert Terhune. Mulholland married Pauline Pierce on May 17, 1932.

In 1939, he was the only foreign officer in the British Magical Society, and by that time had studied his craft in 42 countries.

During World War II, he wrote a spellbook for soldiers. His collection is now owned by David Copperfield.

In 1949, Mulholland was issued a public $10,000 challenge. John J McManus (Magic Collector) issued the challenge in the Conjurors' Magazine (June 1949, Vol 5 Issue# 4). The full page ad called for Mulholland to re-create his famous 'Hooker Rising Trick' under controlled stage conditions with McManus providing the necessary props. Failure to answer the challenge or to correctly recreate the trick would call for publicly accepting the story of his trick as an 'exaggerated myth'.

He was the editor of the Conjurer's Journal and was the only living magician listed in the book Who's who in America immediately after the death of Howard Thurston. Mulholland was also a member and honorary vice-president of the Inner Magic Circle, and a member of the International Brotherhood of Magicians and the Society of American Magicians.

=== CIA work ===
He left his editorial position at The Sphinx in 1953, officially due to health problems but in reality it was a cover for him to work for the Central Intelligence Agency.

During the Cold War, Mulholland was paid by the CIA to write a manual on deception and misdirection. Copies of the document were believed to have been destroyed in 1973, however, copies later resurfaced and were published as "The Official CIA Manual of Trickery and Deception".

In 2008, magician Ben Robinson authored The Magician: John Mulholland's Secret Life which documented his work with the CIA.

== Skepticism ==
Mulholland had criticized the claims of parapsychology and exposed the tricks of fraudulent spiritualist mediums. His book Beware Familiar Spirits (1938) revealed many of these tricks.

A review which highly praised the book, stated that Mulholland had "been sworn at, threatened, and even shot at while acquiring the information".

In 1952 for Popular Science, he published a skeptical article on flying saucers and UFOs.

== Books ==
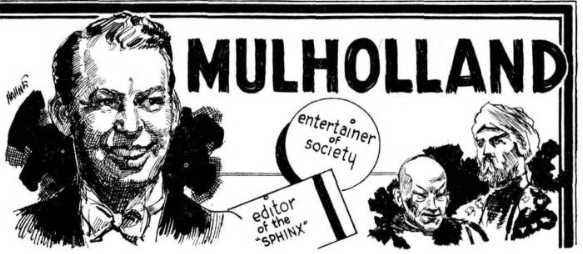
Advert for Mulholland

=== Articles ===
- Secrets of the Fortune-Telling Racket. Popular Science. January, 1931. [with Michel Mok]
- Magicians Scoff. Popular Science. September, 1952.
- The Journal of Necromantic Numismatics, many articles concerning Magic Tokens. 1965-1970.

=== Books ===
- Magic in the Making (1925)
- Quicker than the Eye (1932)
- The Magic and Magicians of the World (1932)
- The Story of Magic (1935)
- Beware Familiar Spirits (1938)
- The Girl in the Cage (1939)
- The Art of Illusion (1944)
- The Early Magic Shows (1945)
- The Official CIA Manual of Trickery and Deception (1953)

- Melton, H. Keith; Wallace, Robert (3 November 2009). The Official CIA Manual of Trickery and Deception. Harper Collins. ISBN 978-0-06-194333-1.

- Practical Puppetry (1961)
- John Mulholland’s Book of Magic (1963)
- Magic of the World (1965)
- The Magical Mind – Key to Successful Communication (1967)
