= Phil Willmarth =

American magician (1931–2014)

Philip Reed Willmarth (August 19, 1931 - September 16, 2014) was an American magician, magic historian, lecturer, author and editor. He was president of the International Brotherhood of Magicians between 2007 and 2008, and had been a member of the organization since 1969.

== Life and career ==
Phil Willmarth was born in New Castle, Pennsylvania. He became interested in magic when his physician father gave him a book on the topic. Wilmarth began performing magic while studying at Allegheny College, where he received a bachelor's degree in Arts in Communications in 1953. He later joined the Army, serving stateside. He began working for the Tatham-Laird Agency, and later founded his own company. Wilmarth returned to magic, moving to Arlington Heights, Illinois in the 1950s. Wilmarth relocated to Durham, North Carolina, in 1998, and died there of cancer on September 16, 2014, aged 83. Willmarth appeared on the cover of The Linking Ring three times. His remains were interred at Lakeside Cemetery in Colon, MI in August 2015.

== Publications ==
Willmarth wrote numerous books and articles on the field of magic and its performance including "The Magic of Matt Schulien" (1959), "Fun With a Handkerchief" (1969), "The Ring and Rope Book" (1975), "Jim Ryan Close-up" (four volumes, 1980–81), "The Knot Collector" (1989) and "The Impostress Princess Expanded" (2011). He also published other authors' books. Willmarth was the assistant editor of The Linking Ring magazine from 1978 to 1992 and executive editor until 2007.

== Awards ==
He was a member of the Order of Merlin Shield and received a Literary Fellowship from the Academy of Magical Arts in 2007.
