= William Wood (ventriloquist) =

American ventriloquist and stage magician

Will B. Wood and his daughter Bertha Mercedes Wood
- Newspaper clipping after the deaths of Will B. Wood and his daughter Bertha Mercedes Wood, 9 March 1908.
- Born: 1861 or 1862; Shamokin, Pennsylvania, US
- Died: January 20, 1908 (aged 46); Gulf of Mexico
- Years active: 1886–1908
- Notable work: "Pistol Shot Vanish" illusion; Edna Levitation illusion.
- Spouse: Sarah Edna Kirker (m. 1880s)
- Children: Bertha Mercedes Woods

William B. Wood (1861/1862 – January 20, 1908) was an American illusionist and ventriloquist who toured South America and Europe with his own company. Billed professionally as Will B. Wood and sometimes called "The Kellar of South America", in reference to mentor Harry Kellar (1849–1922), he was born in Pennsylvania in 1861 or 1862, and began a career in illusions and ventriloquism in 1886 with his wife. After his wife retired in 1906, Wood continued touring until his death in the Gulf of Mexico on January 20, 1908, which was explored unsuccessfully for foul play.

== Early life and marriage ==
Not much is known about Wood's early life. Following his death, Variety reported that he was born in Shamokin, Pennsylvania, and a Miami newspaper said he worked in coal mining as a boy. The Baltimore Sun reported he had a brother, E. A. Wood, who was "a prominent jeweler" in Shamokin.

Wood likely gained interest in ventriloquism as a child, but did not start his professional training until his mid-20s. A short article about "Professor Will B. Wood" appeared in the local paper of New Castle, Pennsylvania, on December 31, 1883, describing him as "the wonderful boy ventriloquist and magician". The article stated he was 17 years old, although his age at death suggests he was actually in his early twenties.

Wood married Edna Kirker (1867–1956) (Note: Her full maiden name appears to have been Sarah Edna Kirker.) of Butler County, Pennsylvania; the couple had one child, daughter Bertha Mercedes Wood, born circa 1888.

== Career and performances ==
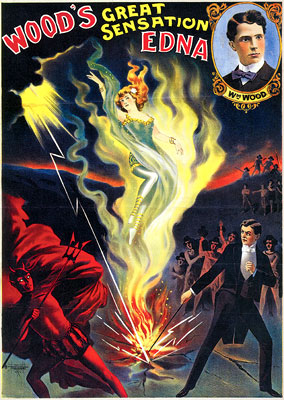
A poster advertising "Edna, the Human Orchid" from 1901

Wood received his stage training under the tutelage of Harry Kellar circa 1886, with whom he traveled until 1890, when he branched out for himself. His wife was the original "Edna, the Human Orchid" as a member of Kellar's company.

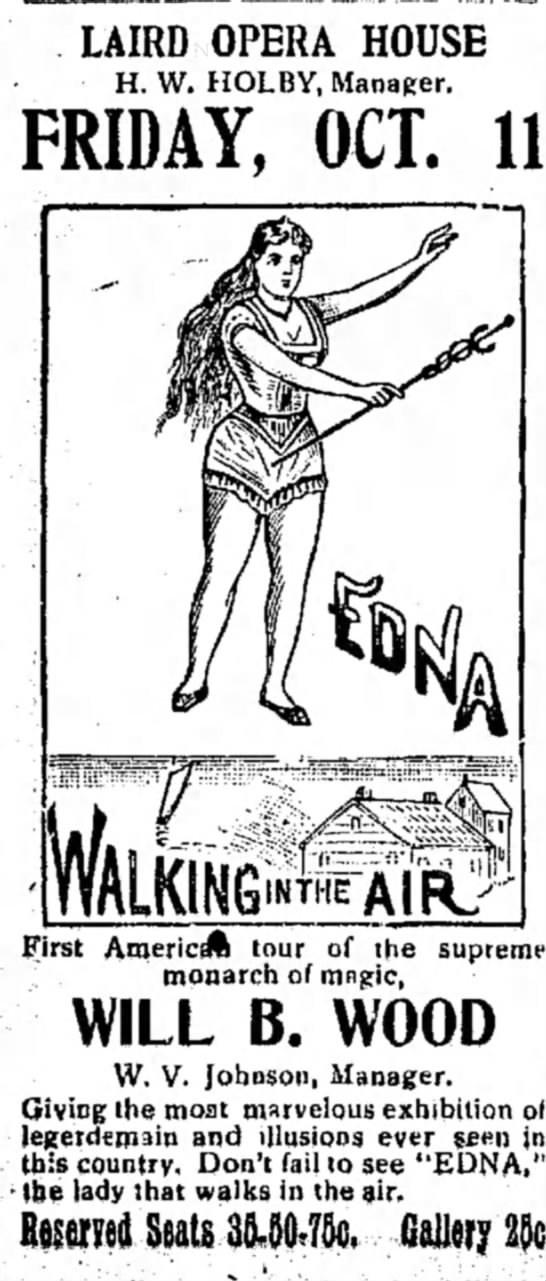
1901 advertisement for Wood's "Edna" illusion

Wood was awarded patents, dated November 12, 1889, for the equipment of a levitation illusion he called "Edna" in which a lady would be lifted up in mid-air and stay there, during which she walked, turned around, and turned over, all while in the air. Wood won a $3,200 verdict in December 1890 against another performer for infringing his patents. After Wood's death, the magician Adelaide Herrmann used this illusion under the name of "The Maid of the Moon".

By the start of 1891, Wood was touring as part of "Steen & Wood's World of Mystery and Novelties" with Martha E. Steen, a telepath, and Charles N. Steen, "the world's greatest exposer of spiritualism". Their three-month tour included stops in Vancouver, Los Angeles, and El Paso. Wood and his wife then set out on a multi-year world tour. A notice that Wood placed in a London-area newspaper in October 1895 said they had recently arrived from South American and were about to tour Spain. In February 1896, Wood placed a notice in the same newspaper, mentioning that the group had performed in 20 countries including Nicaragua, Ecuador, Argentina (Santa Fe, Rosario, and Buenos Aires), and Brazil (Rio de Janeiro and Pernambuco). He noted that members of his company had endured fever, a cholera scare, and smallpox. He said that he and his wife were in England to rest, and they would next return to the United States for a year off.

An October 1901 newspaper advertisement in Pennsylvania announced Wood's first American tour, which appears to have continued until January 1902. In June 1906, The New York Times ran a half-page article about Hastings Clawson, who served as Wood's tour manager for a three-year tour through South America that began in Mexico City in April 1903. Clawson's narrative mentioned stops in Guatemala, Honduras, Peru, Chile, Bolivia, Argentina, Brazil, and Colombia, along with corrupt officials, encounters with revolutionaries, and travel at one point by mule train for a month.

During the height of his career, Wood was widely publicized. Edna joined him during his South American trips until 1906, when failing health forced her retirement. Wood brought in a replacement, (Note: Edna's replacement may have been the couple's daughter, Bertha, but sources are unclear.) who was later an assistant in his show. His most famous effect was the "Pistol Shot Vanish", in which he would cause his assistant to vanish with a pistol shot. However, after his wife's retirement, his career began to decline.

== Death ==
In January 1908, Wood, then aged 46, (Note: Other reports give Wood's age when he died as 43.) and his 20-year-old daughter were in Mexico on their way from Frontera, Tabasco, to Progreso, Yucatán, on a large tugboat called the Cuneto Bulnes, (Note: Other sources list the tug's name as Canuto Buines.) when the ship foundered. On the night of January 20, a violent tropical storm arose and the ship had a schooner in tow. The tow line was cut and the tug tried to ride the storm out unhampered. Reportedly, when the vessel foundered the captain and crew managed to save themselves while Wood and his daughter, the only passengers aboard, were lost.

One newspaper reported they were killed by pirates, and another reported they were robbed by the crew of the tugboat and then "abandoned to the sharks".

=== Investigation ===
In March, it was reported that Hastings Clawson requested assistance from the State Department after being unsatisfied with reports from the U.S consulate and the captain of the tug. Wood's wife claimed that Wood was carrying English bank notes worth $14,000 at the time of his death.

The Magician Monthly reported that the Society of American Magicians (S.A.M.) adopted a resolution urging government authorities and President Theodore Roosevelt to investigate Wood's death (although he was not a member of S.A.M.) as there appeared to be ample ground for suspicion of foul play.

A follow-up article in The New York Times in April stated that the captain of the tug denied that any robbery had occurred, and that the U.S consulate was "satisfied that all was done that could be done to save the passengers." Nonetheless, Wood's wife traveled to Vera Cruz to investigate the deaths, arriving in June after passing through Tampa en route to Havana in late April.

=== Later developments ===
No trace was ever found of the Woods; however, their luggage was later recovered. (Note: Reports are unclear if the luggage washed ashore or had been on the schooner the tug was towing.) One of Wood's theatrical trunks survived and was shipped to his widow, but she was so distraught that she had it shipped to a friend. Wood's trunk consisted of some large ventriloquist figures together with a number of lithographs depicting "Woodita" (a fantastic balance), "La Mariposa" (the human butterfly) "Edna" (the girl from the flames) and a stock portrait of Wood for his proposed Mexican tour (with the legend "The Real Devil" in Spanish beneath his picture).

Hastings Clawson died in Philadelphia in December 1912, aged 32. A January 1913 newspaper article reported that Wood's widow took legal action to dispute the will of Wood's mother.

Vent Haven Museum in Fort Mitchell, Kentucky, reportedly has four of Wood's prop dummies, recovered after washing ashore. A 2013 episode of Mysteries at the Museum recounted the circumstances of Wood's death and the dummies at Vent Haven Museum.

== Sources ==
- Booth, John (February 1980). "Did Anyone Steal the Floating Lady?". Genii.
- Hatch, Richard (July 2006). "The Nielsen Gallery — Wood, The World's Greatest Ventriloquist". M-U-M. Vol. 96, no. 6. p. 70.
