= A Bibliography of Conjuring Periodicals in English: 1791–1983 =

- Author: James B. Alfredson; George L. Daily
- Published: 1986
- Publisher: Magicana for Collectors
- Publication place: United States
- ISBN: 978-0916638375

A Bibliography of Conjuring Periodicals in English: 1791–1983 is a book by James B. Alfredson and George L. Daily that attempts to catalogue all issues of English-language magic periodicals known to reside in major collections. It lists almost 1500 periodicals. Alfredson and Daily's previous work, A Short Title Check List of Conjuring Periodicals in English, listed about 900 periodicals. Father Stephen A. Fernandes supplemented Alfredson and Daily's work in 2000 with Magic Magazines of the Second Millennium, which contained 400 periodicals published 1791–2000.
