= Albert Le Bas =

Irish magician

- Born: Ireland
- Died: 12 September 1972
- Years active: 1950s-1972
- Known for: Magician

Albert Le Bas was a magician from Ireland. He was active from the 1950s until his death in 1972.

He appeared in Irish radio & television, and performed in England. In the 1950s he acquired Harry Houdini's trunk.

He was a member of the International Brotherhood of Magicians, and Society of Irish Magicians
