= Martinka (company) =

American magic company

Coordinates: 40°59′6″N 74°8′22″W

Martinka & Company is America's longest running magic company. The business was for a period owned by Houdini and throughout the years the company has acquired and combined with over 30 other magic firms including Flosso-Hornmann, and Milton Chase.

== Beginnings and early history ==
The business was founded as Martinka & Company in 1877, by two brothers: Francis (1842–1924) and Antonio (1833–1915) Martinka. It is claimed to be the oldest continuously operating magic shop in the United States.

The back of their New York City store housed a workshop where the company was soon building magic illusions and props for virtually all the famous magicians of the day.

In 1902, the Society of American Magicians was founded in Martinka's backroom. And, early on the Martinka magic shop became a hang-out and gathering spot where both famous and unknown, professional and amateur magicians alike could socialize, swap stories and share insights. Over the decades of its circa 150-year-old existence, generations of magic enthusiasts have congregated there. Customers of the past included Alexander Herrmann, Harry Kellar, Howard Thurston, Joseph Dunninger, John Mulholland and Harry Houdini. And in more recent times, Woody Allen, Dick Cavett, Alan Alda, Penn & Teller, David Copperfield, David Blaine and celebrity magician John Stessel among others, have visited the shop. The original magic business location at 493 Sixth Ave, New York city has been listed as a historical site by CityLore (Place Matters) and is identified as the oldest in New York City.

The New York Times once described the shop while owned by the Flossos as "a messy Aladdin's cave of magical marvels from trick cards and ropes to a live lion that one owner, the magician Carter the Great, kept in the back room. It was [like] a fraternity house where a visiting European magician . . . and a curious teenager from Queens might rub elbows, ideas, and magic wands.

== The Back Room ==
Martinka's "Back Room" contained magical treasures dating back to the 1800s along with other secret items that were reserved for a select few. Being invited into the back room was said by some to be a rite of passage in the world of magic. In this space, professional magicians would perform for each other and discuss "the latest developments in the world of magic". Over time, these meetings became more formal, and in 1902, the Society of American Magicians was founded at the back of the store.

== Special projects ==
The Martinka brothers also built the special effects for a number of shows, including the classic 1939 film production of "The Wizard of Oz".

== Owners ==
The business was owned or run by several famous magicians, including Charles Joseph Carter The Great (1917), Harry Houdini (1919), Al Flosso the "Coney Island Fakir" (1939), and his son, Jackie Flosso. Most recently, the firm was acquired by Ted Bogusta who pioneered the online magic auction with high end collectables that on many an occasion achieved record prices for certain items. According to Martinka's then own website, the company continued to purchase magic collections and libraries, which are used to supply magicians and collectors throughout the world with vintage and modern magic and memorabilia.

In 2004, after closing the Martinka brick-and-mortar shop in New York City, the company had only an online presence for a year before reopening a store in Midland Park, New Jersey. The company also resumed the manufacture of magic tricks and props.

== See also ==
- American Museum of Magic
- List of magic museums
