= List of magic publications =

Magic publications are books and periodicals dedicated to the subject of magic. They include reviews of new equipment and techniques, announcements of upcoming events, interviews with prominent magicians, announcements of awards, and columns on such subjects as the history and ethics of the art of magic. Most also feature various explanations and ideas pertaining to magic tricks and effects. Additionally, they commonly offer low-cost advertising opportunities for businesses and events.

== List of magic periodicals ==
Title	First issue	Status
Mahatma	March 1895	Out of print
L'Illusionniste	January 1902	Out of print
The Sphinx	March 1902	Out of print
The Wizard (Selbit)	September 1905	Out of print
Boy Magician/American Magician	April 1909	Out of print
The Magic Mirror	January 1909	Out of print
Magic: The Magazine of Mystery ("Twin" magazine of Ghosts, published on alternating months)	January 1910	Out of print
Ghosts: A Magazine of Romance and Reason ("Twin" magazine of Magic, published on alternating months)	February 1910	Out of print
The Magic Wand	September 1910	Out of print
Magical World	November 2, 1910	Out of print
M-U-M	October 1911	Current
Magical Bulletin	January 1914	Out of print
The Linking Ring	1922	Current
The Demon Telegraph	1923	Out of print
Goldston's Magical Quarterly	1934	Out of print
The Jinx	October 1934	Out of print
Tops	January 1936	Out of print
Genii	September 1, 1936	Current
Chapbook's Scrapbook	July 1938	Out of print
Phoenix	February 1942	Out of print
The Bat	February 1943	Out of print
Al Munroe's Magical Miscellany	June 1943	Out of print
Hugard's Magic Monthly	June 1943	Out of print
The Conjuror's Monthly Magazine	February 1945	Out of print
Gen	1946 or earlier	Out of print
Pentagram	1946	Out of print
Goodliffe's Abracadabra	February 2, 1946	Out of print
The Wizard (Armstrong)	April 1947	Out of print
Bat Jr.	January 1951	Out of print
Christian Conjurer	January 1954	Out of print
New Phoenix	February 19, 1954	Out of print
The Voice of FCM (formerly The Christian Conjurer)	1955	Current
Magicol	September 1959	Current
New Tops	January 1961	Out of print
The New Jinx	May 1962	Out of print
The Pallbearers Review	November 1965	Out of print
Magigram	September 1966	Out of print
The Cauldron	October 1967	Out of print
Hierophant	1969	Out of print
New Pentagram	1969	Out of print
Kabbala	September 1971	Out of print
The Invocation	July 1974	Out of print
Pabular	September 1974	Out of print
Apocalypse	January 1978	Out of print
Bat Droppings	February 1979	Out of print
The New Invocation	October 1979	Out of print
ABC of Magic Sets	March 1980	Out of print
The Perennial Mystics	1983	Out of print
Mortimer's Magic Magazine	1989	Out of print
MAGIC	September 1991	Out of print
Servante	1992	Out of print
The Crimp	1992	Current
Visions Online	2001	Out of print
Gibecière	2005	Current
Reel Magic	July 2007	Current
Newest Tops	May 2009	Current
Card Culture	December 2014	Current
Vibrations		Current
Inside Magic		Current
Smoke & Mirrors E-zine		Current
Magic Roadshow Journal of Magic	June 2004	Current
Vanish Magic Magazine		Current
Ye Olde Magic Mag		Current
Oracle		Out of print
The Disclaimer	April 2021	Current
Mind Over Magic		Out of print
The Hermit	January 2022	Current

== List of notable books on magic ==
- Modern Magic
- Discoverie of Witchcraft
- The Royal Road to Card Magic
- The Expert at the Card Table
- Master Index to Magic in Print
- Tarbell Course in Magic
- Thirteen Steps To Mentalism
