= Harry Kellar =

American stage magician (1849–1922)

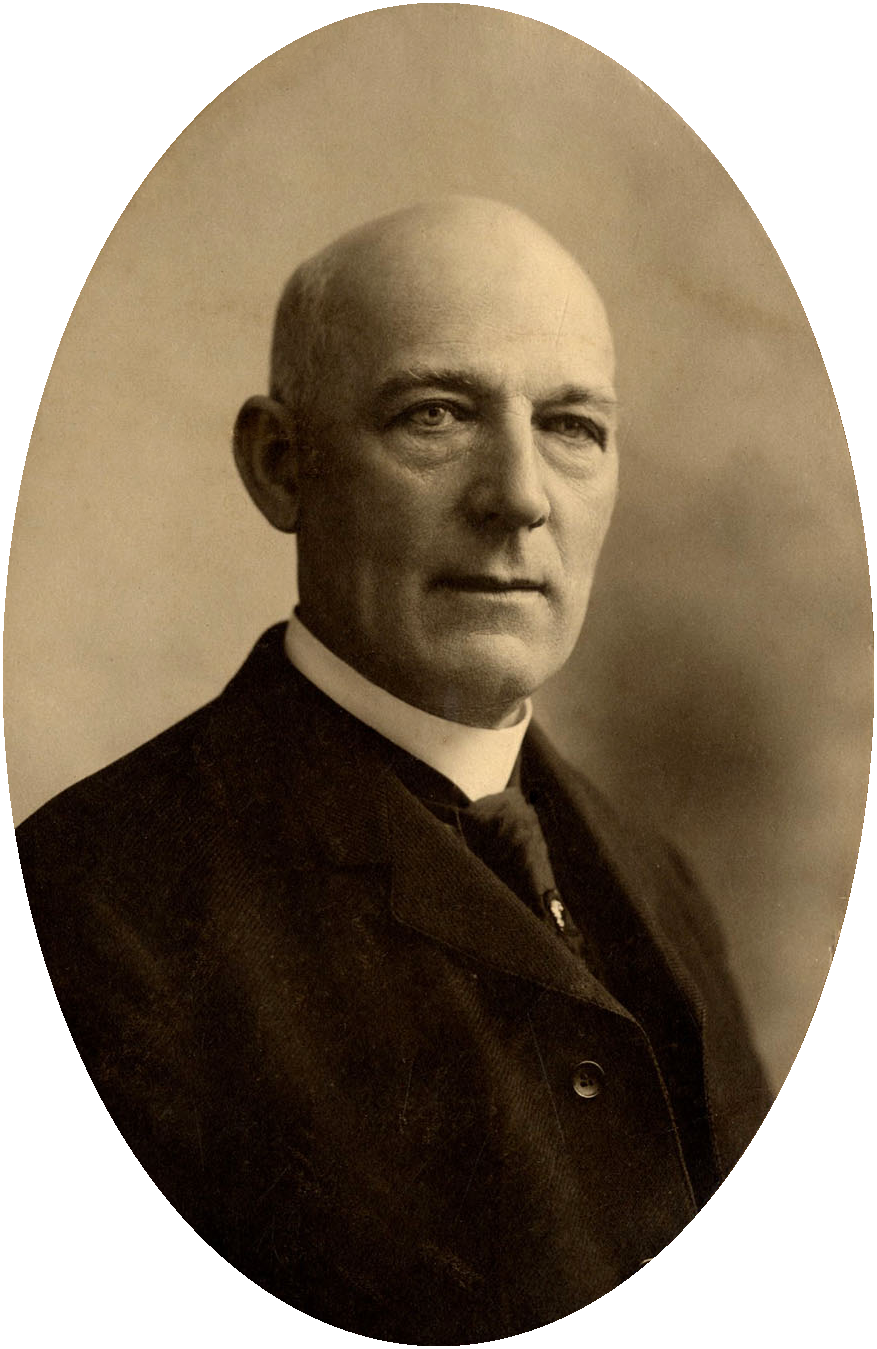
- Born: Heinrich Keller; July 11, 1849; Erie, Pennsylvania
- Died: March 10, 1922 (aged 72); Los Angeles, California
- Resting place: Angelus-Rosedale Cemetery
- Occupation: Illusionist

Harry Kellar (born Heinrich Keller; July 11, 1849 – March 10, 1922) was an American magician who presented large stage shows during the late 19th and early 20th centuries.

Kellar was a predecessor of Harry Houdini and a successor of Robert Heller and Isaiah Hughes, under whom he apprenticed. He was often referred to as the "Dean of American Magicians" and performed extensively on five continents. One of his most memorable stage illusions was the levitation of a girl advertised as the "Levitation of Princess Karnac", copied from an illusion invented by John Nevil Maskelyne, which was later bought by Harry Blackstone Sr.

He was a longtime customer of the Martinka Magic Company, which built many of his illusions and sets, including the "Blue Room".

== Early life ==
As is the case with most magicians, there is little of Kellar's early life that can be confirmed. His real name was Heinrich Keller and he was born to German immigrants in Erie, Pennsylvania. He was sometimes called Henry, but later changed it to Harry. He also changed the spelling of his last name from Keller to Kellar, to avoid confusion with Robert Heller. As a child, Kellar loved to play dangerous games and was known to play chicken with passing trains.

Kellar apprenticed under a druggist and frequently experimented with various chemical mixtures. On one occasion, Kellar reportedly blew a hole in the floor of his employer's drugstore. Rather than confront the wrath of his parents, Kellar stowed away on a train and became a vagabond. He was only ten years old at the time.

Kellar was befriended by a British-born minister of religion from upstate New York. He offered to adopt Kellar and pay for his education if he would study to also become a minister. One evening Kellar saw the performance of a traveling magician, "The Fakir of Ava", the stage name of Isaiah Harris Hughes, and, after the show, Kellar "immediately got the urge to go on the stage". He later told Houdini that, "I became very restless, bought books on magic and finally left my friend and benefactor".

While working on a farm in Buffalo, New York, Kellar answered an ad in the newspaper that was placed by Hughes, who was looking for an assistant. Kellar was hired at the age of 12, and at the age of 16, he gave his first solo performance in Dunkirk, Michigan; it was a disaster and Kellar went back to work with Hughes. Two years later, Kellar tried again with better results, but, as he was in poor financial condition, his early career often consisted of borrowing equipment for the show and avoiding creditors.

== Career ==
In 1869, Kellar began working with "The Davenport Brothers and Fay", which was a group of stage spiritualists made up of Ira Erastus Davenport, William Henry Davenport and William Fay. With the Davenports and Fay, Kellar learned a lot about how to conduct a successful show. Kellar spent several years working with them, until 1873, when he and Fay parted ways with the Davenports and embarked on a "world tour" through Central and South America.

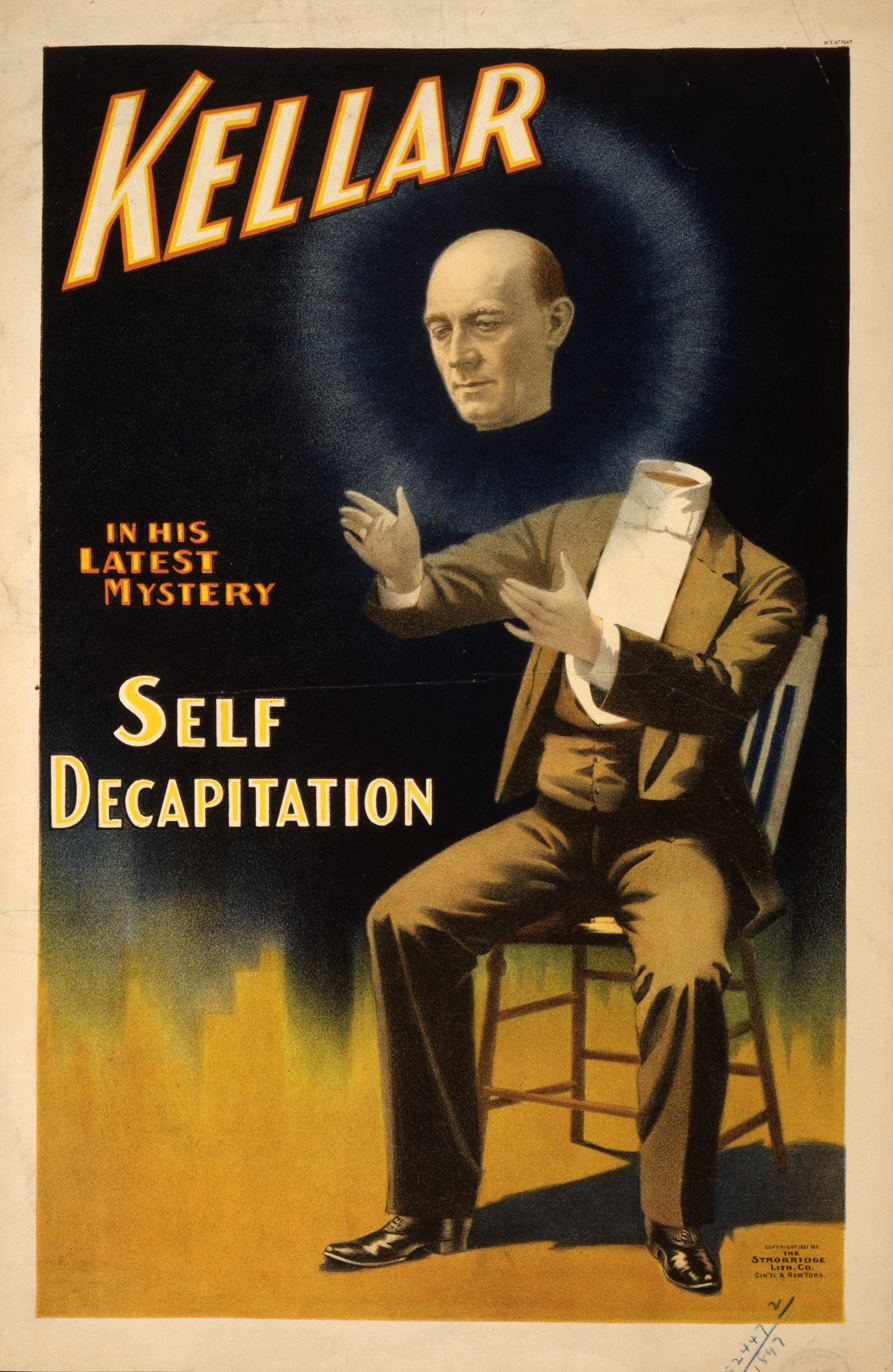
Kellar's famous decapitation and floating head conjuration

In Mexico, they were able to make $10,000 ($277,912 in 2024). In 1875, the tour ended in Rio de Janeiro with an appearance before Emperor Dom Pedro II.

Then, on their way to a tour in England, Boyne, the ship Kellar and Fay were sailing on, sank in the Bay of Biscay. Lost in the wreckage were Kellar's equipment and clothing, along with the ship's cargo of gold, silver. and uncut diamonds. After the shipwreck, Kellar was left with only the clothes on his back and a diamond ring he was wearing. Afterwards, his bankers in New York cabled him telling him that his bank had failed. Desperate for money, Kellar sold his ring and parted ways with Fay, who left to rejoin the Davenports. Kellar was able to perform in Dutch, French, and English, and subsequently toured across the world.

After visiting John Nevil Maskelyne's and George Alfred Cooke's theater, called the Egyptian Hall, Kellar was inspired and liked the idea of performing in one spot. He loved the illusions Maskelyne and Cook performed but it was Buatier de Kolta, then playing there, who performed 'The Vanishing Birdcage', a trick that Kellar decided he must have and spent his remaining money to buy it from him. Kellar borrowed $500 from Junius Spencer Morgan (father of J.P. Morgan), and returned to the United States to try to retrieve his funds from a bank transaction he had initiated when he was in Brazil. Knowing that mail from Brazil was slow, he was able to recover all of the $3,500. With the money, Kellar started a "troupe" based on Masekylne's and Cooke's in England, even going so far as naming his theater the Egyptian Hall.

In 1878, Kellar returned to England and invested $12,000 into purchasing new equipment, including a version Maskelyne's whist-playing automaton "Psycho".

After a disappointing tour in South America, Kellar cancelled his remaining shows and returned to New York. Shortly before arriving, Kellar was told of the death of magician Robert Heller. The New York Sun accused Kellar of violating Heller's personality rights, saying that "Heller is scarcely dead before we read of 'Kellar the Wizard'." The article goes on to say, "Of course 'Kellar' aims to profit by the reputation that Heller left, by adopting a close imitation of Heller's name. This is not an uncommon practice." Kellar attempted to prove that his name had always been Keller with an "e" and that he had actually changed it years previously to try to avoid being confused with Heller. He also pointed out that Heller had changed his name from William Henry Palmer. The public was still unreceptive to him, causing Kellar to eventually cancel his upcoming shows in the United States and return to Brazil.

After another world tour in 1882, Kellar was performing again in Melbourne and met a fan, Eva Lydia Medley, who came backstage to get his autograph. Kellar promised to send postcards and letters from his travels. They exchanged letters for the next five years.

Kellar started his version of Egyptian Hall in December 1884, after renting out an old Masonic temple on Chestnut Street in Philadelphia, Pennsylvania. After 264 performances, Kellar closed the theater on June 24, 1885. Shortly after Kellar left, the theater burned down.

While Kellar was performing in America, Medley arrived a few weeks before his appearance in Erie, Pennsylvania. She played the cornet in the show and started to learn about the magic business. Kellar and Medley were married on November 1, 1887, at a church in Kalamazoo, Michigan. She played an important role in Kellar's shows in the coming years – not only did she play a part in many of his upcoming illusions, but she also provided music for the shows.

Kellar returned to Philadelphia in October 1891 and opened his second Egyptian Hall at Concert Hall, located also on Chestnut Street. On April 30, 1892, Kellar ended a successful seven-month run at his second Egyptian Hall. Kellar then returned to the road.

During the periods Kellar was abroad, another magician, Alexander Herrmann, had become famous and Kellar found himself with a rival on his return to the United States. Herrmann often criticized Kellar's lack of sleight of hand and claimed he preferred to use mechanical tricks instead. While he lacked sleight of hand, Kellar was so good in using misdirection, that he said a "...brass band playing at full blast can march openly across the stage behind me, followed by a herd of elephants, yet no one will realize that they went by." Herrmann died on December 17, 1896.

== Later life ==
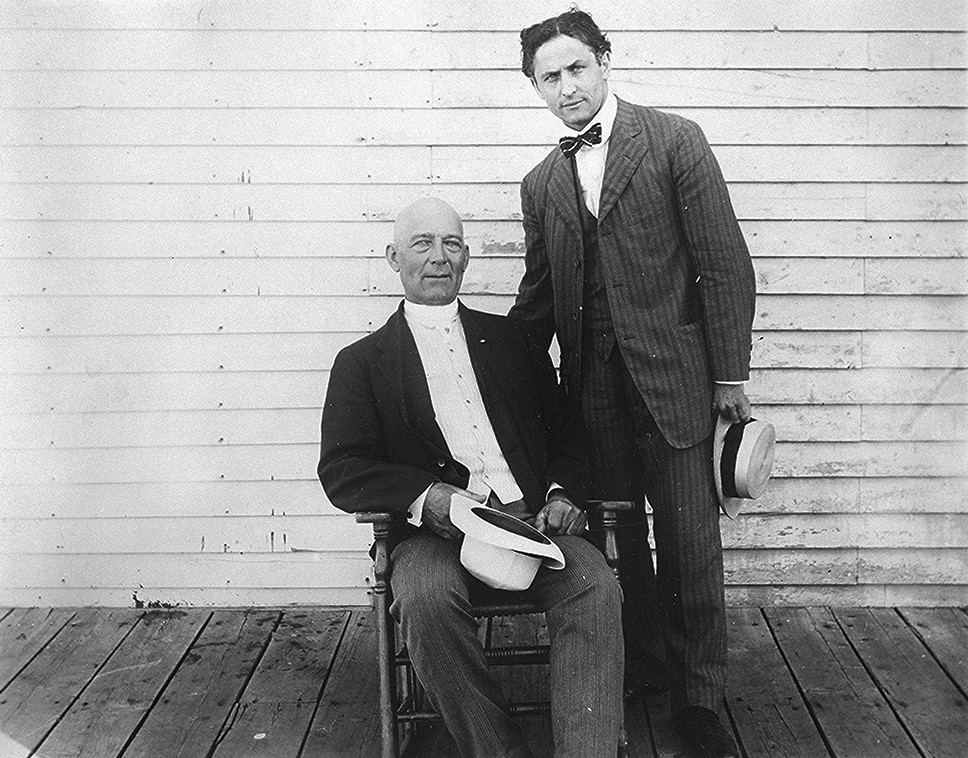
Kellar with Harry Houdini in 1915

Kellar retired in 1908, and allowed Howard Thurston to be his successor. Kellar had met Thurston, who was doing card tricks, while on vacation in Paris, France. Kellar did his final show at Ford's Theatre in Baltimore, Maryland. Kellar eventually moved to his house in Los Angeles, California. Kellar's wife died two years later.

Kellar was often visited by other magicians, notably including Harry Houdini. On November 11, 1917, Houdini put together a show for the Society of American Magicians to benefit the families of those who died in the sinking of the USS Antilles by a German U-boat (who have been considered the first American casualties of World War I). Houdini got Kellar to come out of retirement to perform one more show.

The show took place on the largest stage at the time, the Hippodrome. After Kellar's performance, Kellar started to leave, but Houdini stopped him, saying that "America's greatest magician should be carried off in triumph after his final public performance." The members of the Society of American Magicians helped Kellar into the seat of a sedan chair, and lifted it up. The 125-piece Hippodrome orchestra played "Auld Lang Syne" while Kellar was slowly taken away.

Kellar lived in retirement, until he died on March 3, 1922, from a pulmonary hemorrhage brought on by influenza. He was interred in Angelus-Rosedale Cemetery in Los Angeles.

== Notable illusions ==
=== "The Levitation of Princess Karnac" ===
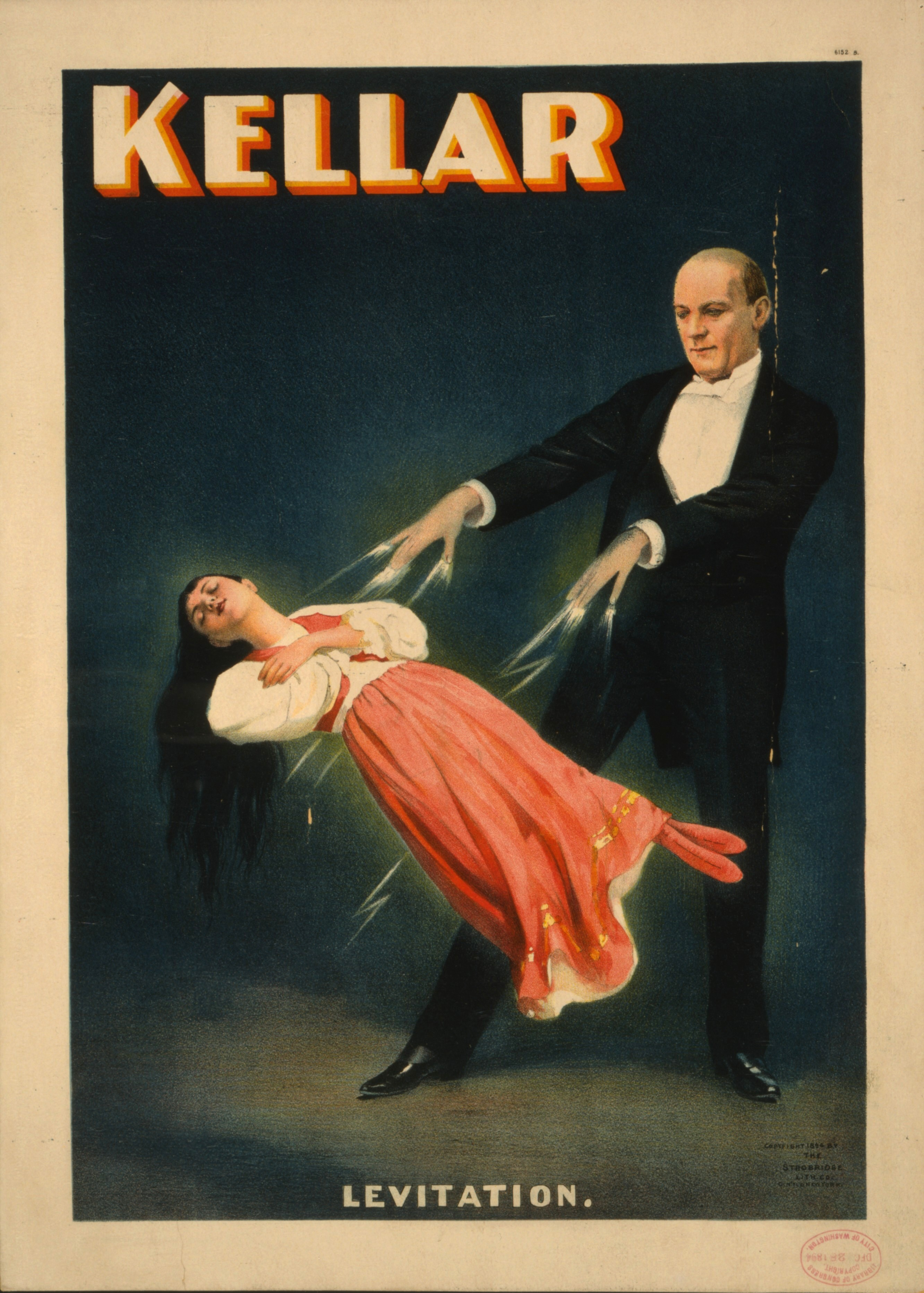
Kellar's "Levitation of Princess Karnac"

Use of a goose-necked support bar to pass a hoop around a body in Kellar's levitation illusion

Kellar supposedly developed this trick by abruptly walking onto the stage during a show by Maskelyne, seeing what he needed to know, and leaving. Unable to duplicate it, Kellar hired another magician to help build another, but eventually designed a new trick with the help of the Otis Elevator Company. Another version built by Kellar was purchased by Harry Blackstone, Sr., who used the trick for many years. The Buffalo writer John Northern Hilliard wrote that the levitation was a marvel of the twentieth century and "the crowning achievement of Mr. Kellar's long and brilliant career."

The trick was done by a disguised machine hidden from the audience's perspective. Kellar would claim the woman onstage, sleeping on a couch, was a Hindu princess, who he would levitate and then move a hoop back and forth through the woman's body to prove she was not being suspended. Inside the "princess"'s dress was a flat board she was resting on, which was connected to a metal bar going out the side into the backstage. The other end of the bar connected to a machine to raise and lower the woman, blocked from view by the curtain and her own body. To allow Kellar to "prove" with the hoop that she was floating, the bar was in a rough "S" shape, letting him move the hoop through the length of her body in any direction.

=== "The Nested Boxes" ===
Kellar borrows six finger rings from members of audience. He loads them into the barrel of a pistol, aims and fires the pistol at a chest that is hanging on the side of the stage. The chest is opened and inside is another, smaller chest. Inside that are six boxes nested in each other. As each is opened, they are stacked on top of each other and inside the smallest one are the five rings each tied with ribbon to flowers. The five rings are returned to their owners. The owner of the sixth ring wonders what happened to hers, with Kellar pretending not to notice.

He continues with his next trick, which is a variation of Robert-Houdin's "Inexhaustible Bottle". Audience members call out different beverages like wine, whiskey, lemonade, or just water. Each one is poured from the same bottle and the audience acknowledges that they are indeed receiving their requested drinks. Once the bottle is empty, Kellar takes it and breaks it open. Inside is a guinea pig with a sash around its neck which has the sixth ring attached to it. The ring is eventually handed back to its owner.

A variation of the trick was performed in front of United States President Theodore Roosevelt and his children, Ethel, Archie, Quentin and Kermit. Ethel was the owner of the sixth ring and after Kellar had returned her ring, he asked if she would also like to have the guinea pig as a pet. Then Kellar wrapped the guinea pig in paper and handed it back to Ethel. When it was opened, inside was a bouquet of pink roses.

=== "The Vanishing Lamp" ===
A lamp is seen set on top of a glass table. Kellar covers the glowing lamp with a thin cloth. Kellar told the audience that each evening, the lamp would be returned to its purported, original owner in India at a specific time. As a bell sounded out the current time of day, Kellar loaded a pistol and aimed it towards the lamp. At the last chime, Kellar fired the pistol. The lamp seemed to melt away, with the cloth falling to the stage.

Kellar was known to have a short temper, and once, after an incident in which the "Vanishing Lamp" failed to vanish, he took an axe to the defective prop. Later Kellar built another one that would continue to work reliably long after his retirement.

== Publications ==
- Kellar's Aids in Arithmetical Calculations and Professional Tours Around the World (1885)
- A Magician's Tour: Up and Down and Round About the Earth (1890)
- High Caste Indian Magic (1893)
- Kellar's Wonder Book (1903)

== See also ==
- List of people from Erie, Pennsylvania
- List of vaudeville performers
- William Wood, a ventriloquist, who trained under Kellar before launching his own career
