= Richard J. Weibel =

Stage magician and scholar

Richard J. Weibel was a magician and magic scholar. He was a long-time contributor to The Linking Ring, writing the column "Conjuring Psychology" for many years. One of his most notable articles appeared in Genii magazine in 1980. The article, titled "Emporiums of Miracles", began a series of articles outlining the history of magic shops throughout the US. Weibel was featured on the cover of The Linking Ring in 1994. He contributed an article to The Sphinx on the psychology of magic.
