= Portsmouth and District Magic Circle =

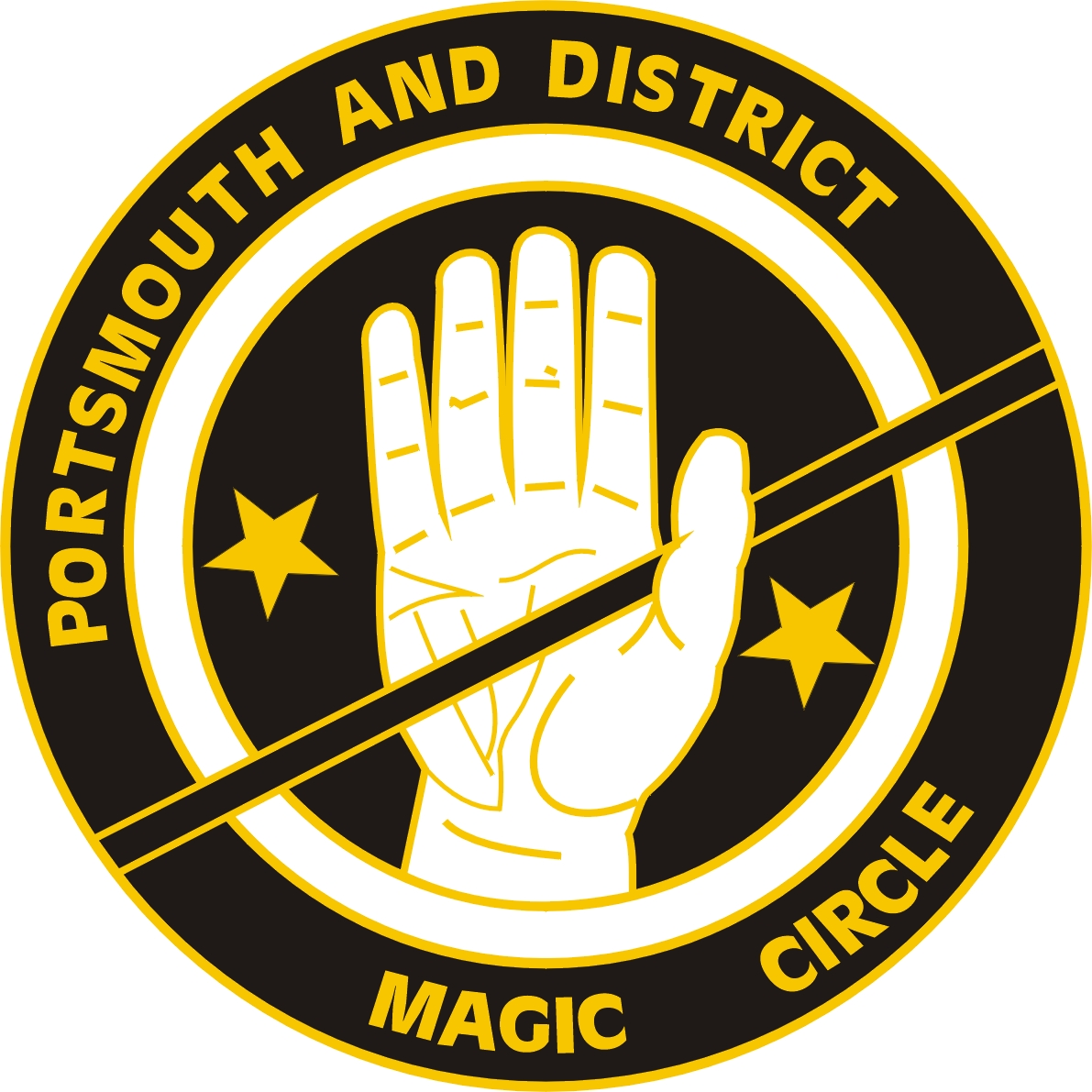
Logo of the Portsmouth and District Magic Circle

The Portsmouth and District Magic Circle (PDMC) is a magicians' society based in Portsmouth in the English county of Hampshire. It is one of the largest magic societies in the UK with nearly 100 members.

The society was founded in 1938 at a meeting in the Talbot Hotel in Portsmouth. Amongst its founding members were the close-up magician Lewis Ganson and the master illusionist Will Ayling, author of The Art of Illusion and Oriental Conjuring and Magic. Another early member was the engineer and illusionist Donald Stevenson who worked for the American magician William Ellsworth Robinson and created mechanical illusions in a workshop he shared with Robinson. In the 1950s, Stevenson wrote articles about his memories of Robinson for the PDMC's magazine, Top Hat, extracts of which are reproduced in The Glorious Deception: The Double Life of William Robinson.

The society organizes an annual event called "Jumbo Day" in which magicians from around the UK gather to trade and sell magic equipment and paraphernalia and attend workshops and demonstrations. The event closes with a gala magic show in the evening. According to the PDMC, "Jumbo Day" is southern England's "largest annual one-day magic event." Members also raise money for the Anthony Nolan Trust with "Magic Trek", a sponsored walk from the headquarters of the PDMC in Portsmouth to the headquarters of The Magic Circle in London, stopping off at various magic societies along the route. The first "Magic Trek" took place in 2009 led by PDMC member Sean Lobban dressed in a giant bunny costume accompanied by an escapologist, a juggler, a magician, and several other entertainers.
