= Donald E. Wiberg =

Professional magician

Donald E. Wiberg is a professional magician. He was born in Chicago, Illinois where he spent most of his life. He was the 46th President of the International Brotherhood of Magicians. He has served approximately 20 terms as International Secretary of the IBM.
