= Fakir of Ava =

American magician, illusionist

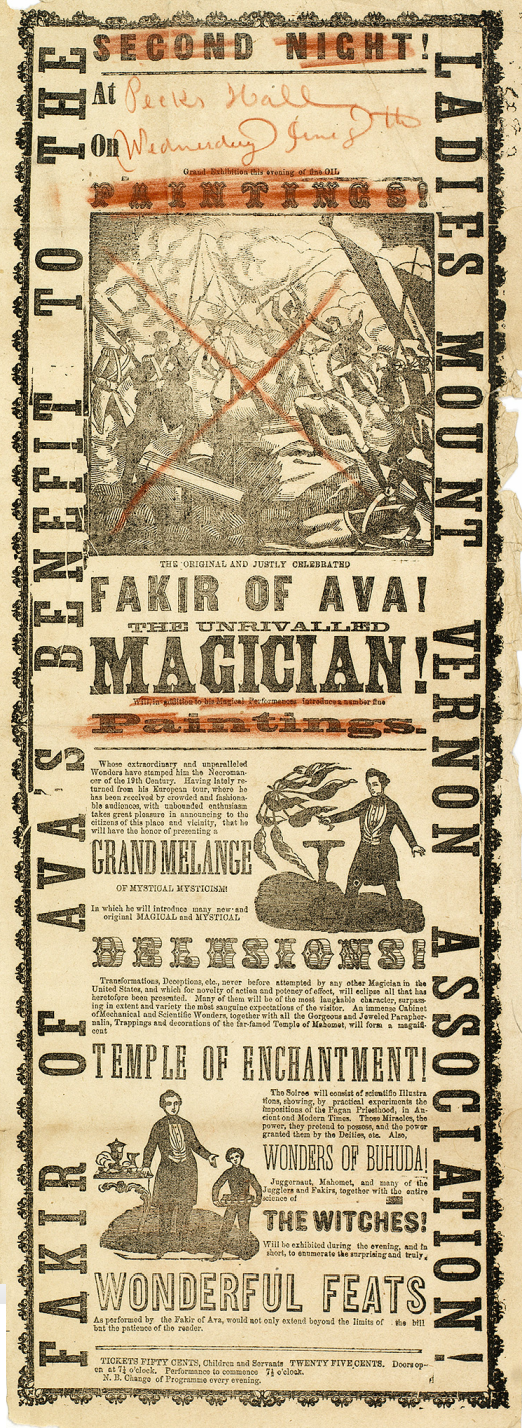
Broadside advertisement for a performance by the Fakir of Ava

Isaiah Harris Hughes (25 December 1813 – 24 May 1891), better known as the Fakir of Ava, was a 19th-century stage magician, the teacher of Harry Kellar.

== Biography ==
Hughes was born in Essex, England, but moved to the United States and became an illusionist. He would wear dark makeup, exotic clothing, and claim to come from Ava in Burma. He billed himself as "The Fakir of Ava, Chief of Staff of Conjurors to His Sublime Greatness the Nanka of Aristaphae". In addition to billing standard European tricks as great Oriental feats, he invented many tricks of his own. He later gave up his costume and performed in formal evening dress.

After gaining wealth through his performances, he purchased a large property in Buffalo, New York, at the time the city was rapidly growing thanks to the Erie Canal. In 1874, he married Sarah Stanfield, the teenaged daughter of Frederick Clarkson Stanfield, who painted theatrical scenery. They had two sons, Frank Fakir and Harry Ava. He died of pneumonia in 1891.

== Professional career ==
=== Promotion ===
Hughes pioneered public relations in his skill at getting local newspapers to promote his show with journalism rather than advertisements and to report on the show afterwards.

=== Double bills ===
To increase the likelihood of positive word-of-mouth after a show, Hughes would add other entertainers to the bill, including ventriloquist John W. Whiston, or add himself to another bill, such as the circus of P. T. Barnum.

=== Gift shows ===
In 1857, Hughes came up with the idea of a "gift show", a gimmick that was later used by many magicians in the 19th century. In his gift shows, Hughes would, in addition to performing magic, give away door prizes. While most of the gifts were inexpensive trinkets such as second-hand watches or brass jewelry, he would also give away larger prizes such as sewing machines, live pigs, half-tons of coal, complete sets of bedroom furniture, musical instruments including pianos, and packets of cash. The concept excited audiences and increased profits because of the large crowds it drew — "I quickly put South again and coined money," said Hughes later.

=== Name ===
The fame of Hughes and his show resulted in his name being appropriated by other magicians. He prefixed "genuine" to Fakir of Ava and wrote letters to warn consumers.

=== Influence ===
The magician Howard Thurston said, "The historian of magic can trace an unbroken line of succession from the Fakir of Ava in 1830 to my own entertainment." Most of these lines of succession begin with Hughes's second apprentice, Harry Kellar.

When Harry Kellar, later known as the "Dean of American Magicians", was a youth, he saw Hughes perform, and immediately decided that he wanted to be a magician himself. He became Hughes' assistant, and thus began his career as a traveling stage magician. Between his apprenticeship and creating his own show, Kellar would perform as the Fakir of Ava in an aging Hughes's place.

== Effects ==
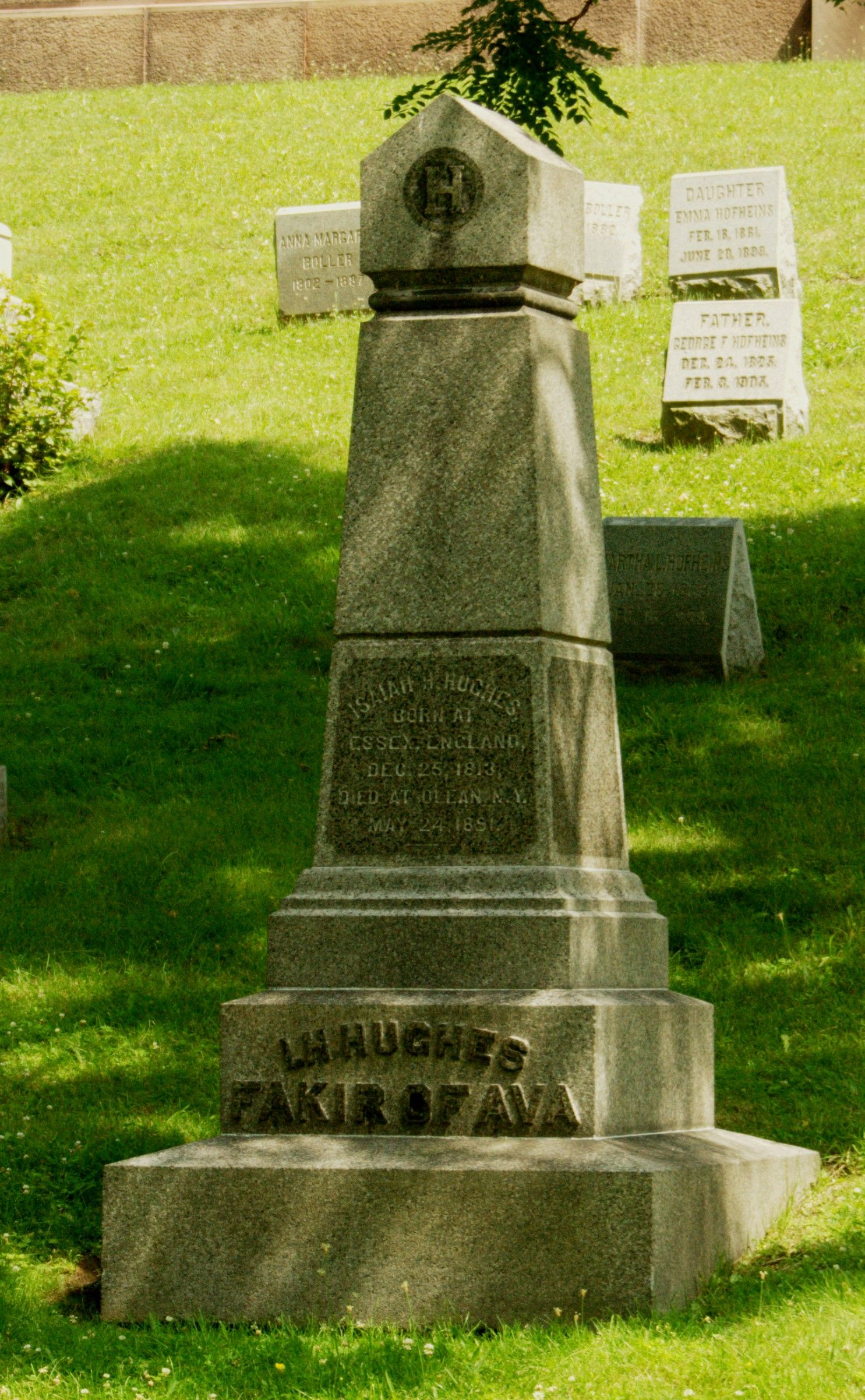
The Fakir of Ava's grave in Forest Lawn Cemetery, Buffalo

Some of the effects Hughes performed included (from playbills)

- The Enchanted Canopy
- The Aeriel [sic?] Bank or Mysterious Treasury in the Air
- Hindoo Cup Trick
- The Mephistophole's Hat
- The Card Printer
- The Fairy Star
- The Great Orange Trick
- The Chinese Plate Illusion
- How to Cook an Omelet, and Produce Game and Ring
- The Bank Note and Enchanted Candle
- The Flying Watches
- The Enchanted Fishery
- The Express Laundry
- The Wonderful Hat
- The Witches Pole or the obedient Mysterious Blood Writing on the Arm
- Vanishing Cage, Balls and Game
- Laughable Ribbon and Paper Trick
- The Great African Box and Sack Feat (Mysterious Appearance and Disappearance)
- The Sealed Packet Or Wonders of Supernatural Vision
- Angel's Flight through Mid-Air!
- The Elements
- Dove of Buddha
- Wizard Portfolio
- Mystic Clock
- Japanese Butterfly Trick
- Aerial Couch
- Gun Feat
- Bottle Feat
- Great Second Sight Mystery
