= Vent Haven Museum =

American museum about ventriloquism

- Location within Kentucky
- Established: 1973
- Location: 33 West Maple Avenue; Fort Mitchell, Kentucky
- Coordinates: 39.053°N 84.552°W
- Collections: Ventriloquial figures
- Collection size: 1,000+
- Founder: William Shakespeare Berger
- President: John S. Brooking
- Curator: Lisa Sweasy
- Website: venthaven.org

Vent Haven Museum is an American museum of ventriloquial figures and memorabilia. It claims to be the only such museum in the world. The museum is located in Fort Mitchell, Kentucky, five miles (8.0 km) south of Cincinnati. It opened in 1973.

The museum is open seasonally, May through September, by appointment only. As of March 2022, the museum was closed for construction on a new facility. The museum is scheduled to reopen on May 9, 2023.

== History ==
Vent Haven Museum was founded by William Shakespeare Berger (1878–1972), a Cincinnati businessman and amateur ventriloquist. Berger amassed his collection of approximately 500 dummies from 1910 until his death. The museum has continued to grow through donations of ventriloquism materials, and its collection has doubled in size since opening as a public museum in 1973.

== Collection ==
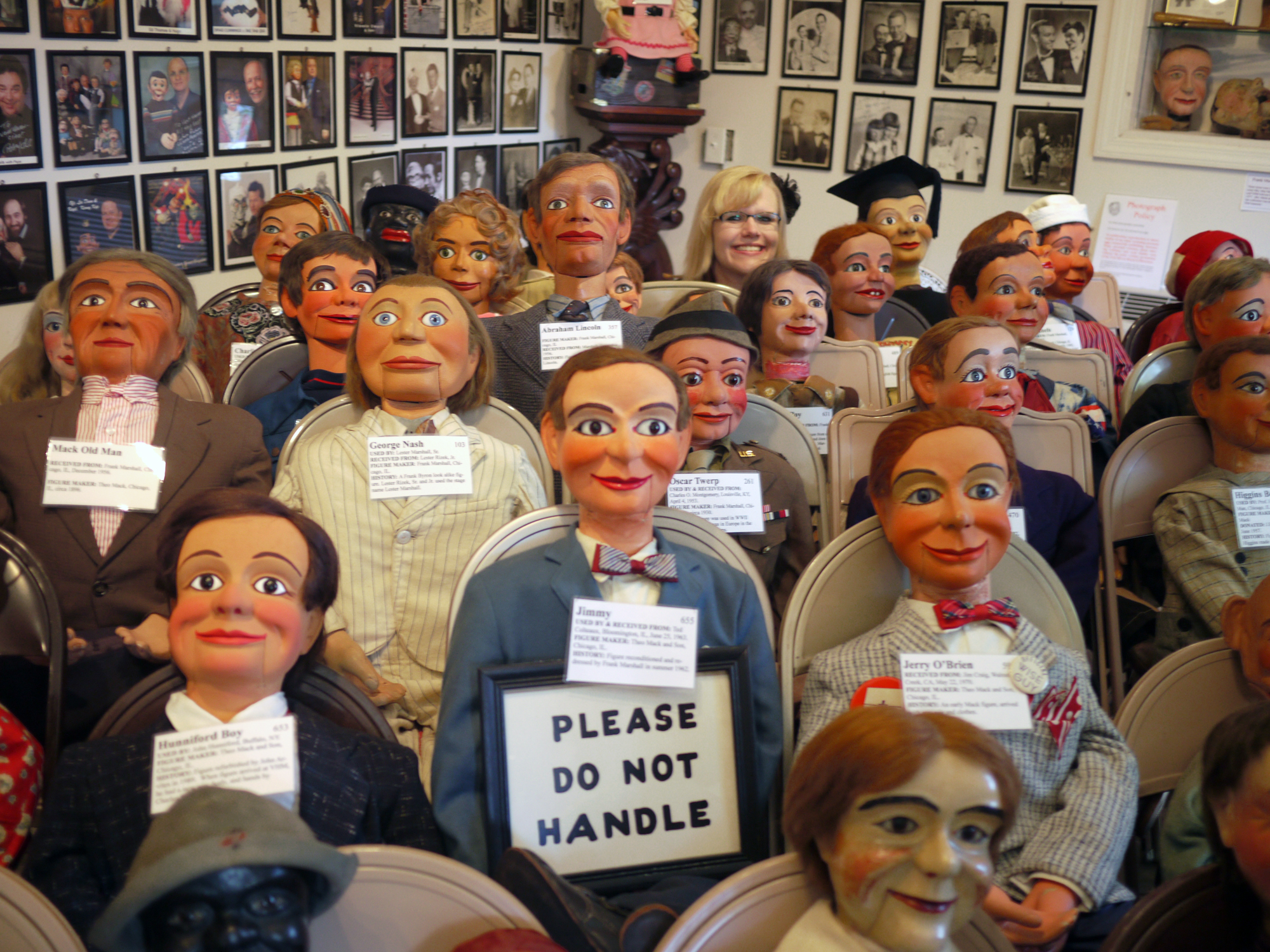
Ventriloquist figures at the museum

The museum's collection contains more than 1,000 ventriloquist figures from 20 countries, as well as hundreds of photographs and other pieces of memorabilia related to ventriloquism. The collection includes replicas of figures used by Edgar Bergen, Paul Winchell, and Shari Lewis, and authentic performance pieces used by Jimmy Nelson, Willie Tyler, Jay Johnson, Terry Fator, Jeff Dunham, and Darci Lynne.

The museum has four performance figures that reportedly belonged to William Wood, who died under unclear circumstances when the tugboat he and his daughter were on foundered in the Gulf of Mexico in 1908. The dummies were later recovered after washing ashore. A 2013 episode of Mysteries at the Museum recounted the circumstances of Wood's death and the figures at the museum.
