= Broken wand ceremony =

Ritual performed at the funeral of a magician

A broken wand ceremony is a ritual performed at or shortly before the funeral of a magician, in which a wand – either the wand which the magician used in performances, or a ceremonial one – is broken, indicating that with the magician's death, the wand has lost its magic.

The first broken wand ceremony was held in 1926, after the death of Harry Houdini. The Society of American Magicians continues to hold an annual ceremony at Houdini's grave.

== British monarchy ==
At the funeral of a British monarch, a wand is broken over the coffin to signify the end of service for the Lord Chamberlain.
