= W. Golden Mortimer =

Stage Magician, American Physician, and Notable Author of the Gilded Age

Dr. W. Golden Mortimer
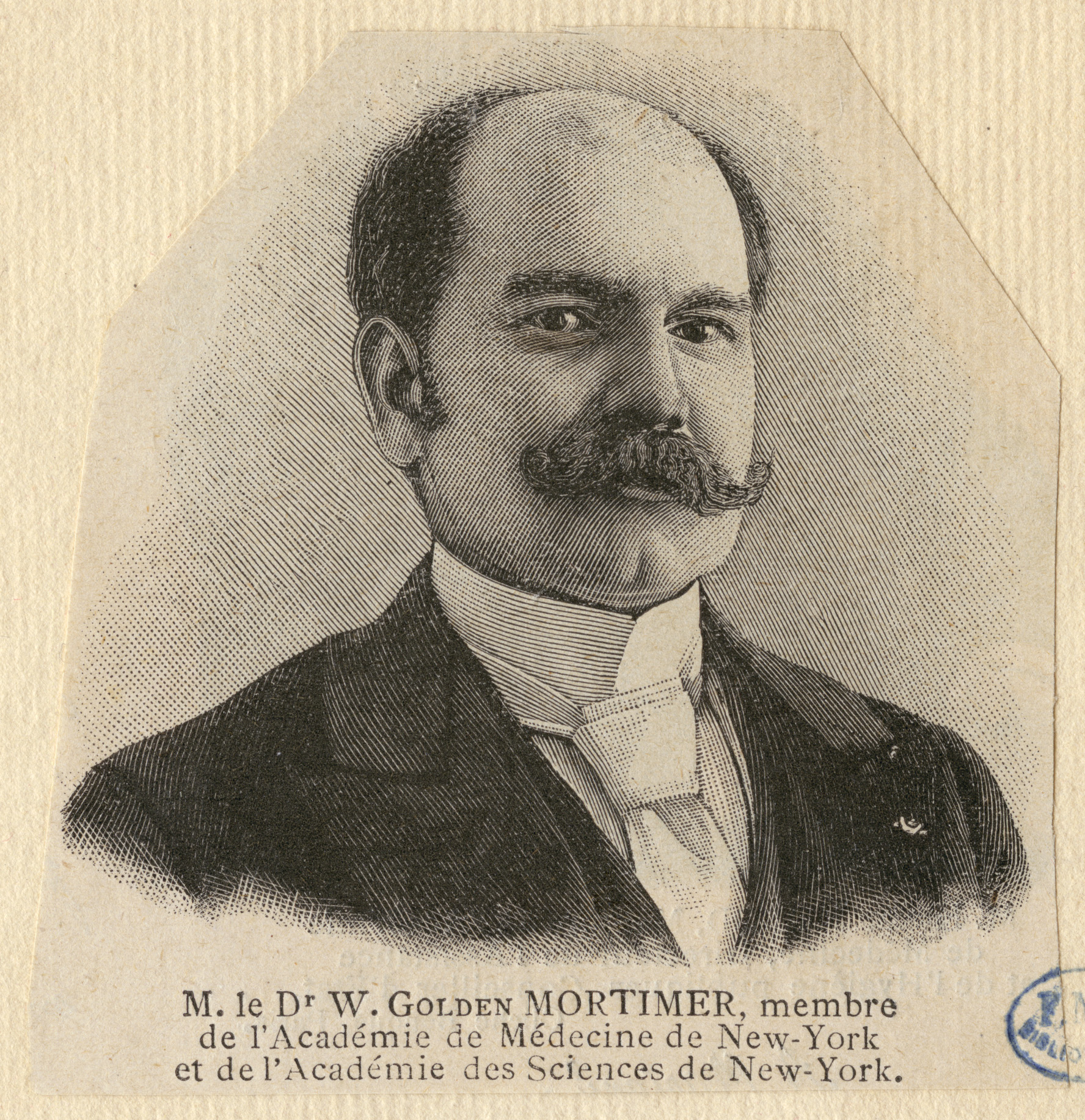
- Dr William Golden Mortimer American Doctor, Author and Stage Magician.
- Born: December 27, 1854; Manhattan, New York
- Died: March 3, 1933 (aged 78); Manhattan, New York
- Citizenship: American
- Education: M.D., New York University
- Occupations: Physician, author, magician
- Era: The Gilded Age
- Organization: Society of American Magicians
- Known for: First National President of the Society of American Magicians
- Notable work: "History of Coca :The Divine Plant of the Incas"
- Title: M.D., Doctor of Medicine

William Golden Mortimer (December 27, 1854 – March 3, 1933) was an American Stage magician, physician, and author, best known for his influential book History of Coca: The Divine Plant of the Incas. He was the inaugural president of the Society of American Magicians.

== Biography ==
=== Early life and magic career ===
Mortimer began his career as a stage magician, apprenticed to Robison, the Fakir. Performing as "Mortimer's Mysteries," he toured the United States and became recognized for his showmanship and precision. His early prominence in the magic community led to his foundational role in the Society of American Magicians (S.A.M.).

William G. Mortimer and Harry Houdini not only worked together to strengthen the magic community through the S.A.M., they worked together to bring professionalism to the magic community through lectures, research and literature. In Harry Houdini's book, The Unmasking of Robert Houdin, Harry Houdini gives a lengthy history of W. Golden Mortimer's stage show through the years, he also relies heavily on W. Golden Mortimer's Critical research of Robert Houdin's prop equipment. Houdini gives great credit to Mortimer for his efforts over the years, in exposing magicians who claimed to have true psychic powers.

=== Leadership in magic ===
Mortimer was a key figure in organizing and advancing the American magic community. He served as the first National President of S.A.M. from 1902 to 1905, helping to establish the society's mission and structure. His leadership was instrumental in shaping S.A.M. as a central institution for magicians in the United States. Willam Mortimer was not only a founding member of the S.A.M. he designed their logo by hand and created their Secret Initiation ritual which has been noted for its similarity to the initiation degrees of Freemasonry. He also initiated a network of Stage Magic historians across the country, cataloging as much research in the New York head quarter's as possible.

=== Medical career ===
After retiring from performing, Mortimer pursued medicine, earning his M.D. from New York University in 1885. He specialized as an otolaryngologist and contributed to medical literature, serving as editor for journals such as the Pharmaceutical Journal and the New York Journal of Medicine.

=== Literary contributions ===
Mortimer authored History of Coca: The Divine Plant of the Incas (1901), a comprehensive study of the coca plant's botanical, cultural, and medicinal significance. The book is noted for its meticulous research and remains a valuable resource for ethnobotanists and historians. His in-depth research into the psychological effects of coca have been used in psychology journals and studies.

=== Legacy ===
Mortimer's dual career in magic and medicine distinguished him as a multifaceted figure in early 20th-century America. He was inducted in the S.A.M. Hall of Fame (as William Mortimer) for his stage work and many contributions to the field of magic. His scholarly and literary work on coca continues to be recognized for its lasting impact.

=== Death ===
Dr. W. Golden Mortimer died on March 3, 1933, in Manhattan, New York City, at the age of 78.

== Works ==
- Mortimer, William Golden (1901). Peru. History of coca, 'the divine plant' of the Incas; with an introductory account of the Incas, and of the Andean Indians of to-day. New York: J. H. Vail & Company – via archive.org.
