= Kristen Johnson =

U.S. American escape artist

- Born: Glens Falls, New York
- Occupation: Escape artist
- Spouse: Kevin Ridgeway

Kristen Johnson is an American escape artist who works with her husband, magician Kevin Ridgeway, under the names Living Illusions, Ridgeway & Johnson, and Breathless. She was the featured magician on the cover of the June 2009 issue of the magicians' magazine The Linking Ring.

== Early life ==
Johnson was born in Glens Falls, New York, and grew up in Carmel, Indiana. Her mother, Sunny Johnson, was also a performer best known for her work as a clown. Sunny was featured on the front cover of The Linking Ring magazine in March 2002 and still lives in Carmel, where she owns a clowning supply company. Johnson began learning magic when she was a teenager and used it to earn money to pay for college.

== Performing career ==
Johnson and her husband Kevin Ridgeway are Christians and, under the name Living Illusions, built up a reputation as performers specializing in faith based events such as the Will Graham Celebration with evangelist Billy Graham's grandson in May 2008. In 2007, they launched a full-length touring theater show under the name Breathless, which has played across the United States.

Johnson's signature escape is the Full View Water Torture Cell, in which she is chained up and locked inside a water filled tank from which she escapes in full view of the audience. The full view aspect differentiates it from Houdini's Chinese Water Torture Cell escape, which required a curtain to be drawn to obscure him from the audience while he escaped. She performed the original version of the stunt as part of the Worldwide Escape Artist's Relay in 2005, which was an attempt to set a world record for the largest number of escapes performed in a day.

Full View Water Torture Cell

On October 29, 2006, during the 4th Annual International Escape Convention, Johnson was presented with The Masters Award by Thomas Blacke of Escape Masters magazine. She performed a new version of her Full View Water Torture Cell, making her one of only two artists to have performed at the first four international escape artist conventions that had been held.

Johnson's water cell stunt requires her to hold her breath while she picks up a series of locks that fasten chains and secure the lid of the cell. She averages 2 minutes and 48 seconds underwater on one breath. However, she has occasionally taken up to 3 minutes and 18 seconds to free herself. The longest time she has ever held her breath is 5 minutes and 2 seconds. She ends her shows with this escape and has performed it as often as 30 times in ten days. She offers a $10,000 challenge to anyone who can prove that she takes a second breath, uses an underwater breathing apparatus or a key once she has dropped below the water.

== Accident ==
On January 16, 2009, while performing her water torture cell escape during the halftime show of a basketball game between the Detroit Pistons and the Oklahoma City Thunder, Johnson lost consciousness while attempting to open the top of the cell. She had to be quickly rescued by assistants. A week later, she successfully performed her water torture cell escape at the Ford Park Event Center in Beaumont, Texas. This was her 600th performance of the escape.
