= Mahatma (magazine) =

- First page of issue 1 (March 1895)
- Editor: George H. Little
- Frequency: Monthly
- First issue: March 1895
- Final issue Number: February 1906; 104 (V9N8)

Mahatma was a monthly magic periodical founded by George Little, which was published March 1895 – February 1906 (issue 104). According to Alfredson and Daily, it was "the first English language magical serial of any substance". With the September 1902 issue, it became the official magazine of the Society of American Magicians. Mahatma was printed in the back of New York City's Martinka's magic shop.

== Publication history ==
The first issue of Mahatma was published in March 1895. There was a gap in publication of 28 months between issues 8 and 9 of volume 1. During this time, the publishers put out 2 other magazines that followed the numbering of Mahatma: Vaudeville and Artist Era. Vaudeville claimed to be a continuation of Mahatma with a change in name and format, and ran for two issues (Volume 1 Numbers 9 & 10). Only two issues of Artist Era are known to exist (Volume 1 Numbers 11 & 13). When it continued publication of volume 1, Mahatma ignored the numbering of Vaudeville and Artist Era and continued with volume 1 number 9.

in 1902, Mahatma began publishing the meeting notes of the Society of American Magicians. It became the society's official magazine starting with the September 1902 issue.

A complete set comprises nine volumes, all containing 12 issues except for volume 9, which contains only 8. Vaudeville and Artist Era are sometimes considered necessary to complete a collection.
