= Robert Heller (magician) =

English magician, mentalist and musician

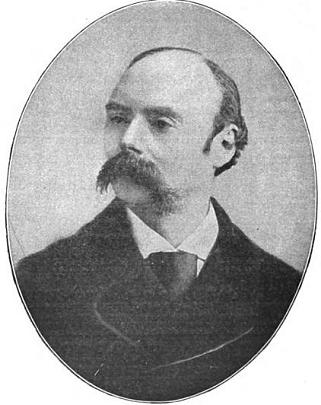
- Occupation: Magician

Robert Heller, also Joseph Heller, (born William Henry Palmer; 1826–1878) was an English magician, mentalist, and musician. The year of his birth is the subject of some speculation; some sources list it as 1829 while others claim 1830.

As the son of a famous concert pianist, Heller began his life as a musician studying at the Royal Academy of Music. After becoming fascinated with magic at age 14, Heller began copying his idol Jean Eugène Robert-Houdin, from whom he adopted his first name. Heller left his scholarship at the academy to become a professional magician. However, he gained a reputation as both a magician and a concert pianist when he arrived in New York in 1852, eventually settling permanently in the United States. For instance, he gave the first American performance of Ludwig van Beethoven's Piano Concerto No. 5 in the Boston Music Hall on 4 March 1854, accompanied by the orchestra of the Germania Musical Society led by future New York Philharmonic conductor Carl Bergmann.

A reporter for the St. Louis Luminary, recorded his impressions of a Robert Heller magic performance of February 7, 1855, in Washington D.C.:

At night I went to see the performance of an acrobatic Macromancer by the name of Robert Heller, who performed some wonderful feats. He caused an orange tree to bloom and bring forth fruit. Real ripe oranges which were distributed among the crowd, and afterward butterflies came out from among its leaves. A boy was suspended upon two poles, one placed under each arm about midway from the elbow to the shoulder and the stool upon which he stood was then taken from under his feet. The boy was entirely senseless, choloriform (sic) having been administered unto him. The poles had no fastenings, but were set loose upon the floor. One of the poles was then taken from under his left arm, which left him suspended by one arm, his left hand was then touched by the Necromancer when it fell to his side; his right hand was then raised so as to rest his face upon it. His feet were then directed to a horizontal position with his head and thus he remained suspended for sometime — his whole body resting upon noting save the right arm upon the end of the pole. Money, handkerchiefs and many other articles were passed from under silver vases on one table to others at another part of the stage without seemingly any human agency. Many other wonderful feats were performed by this great Necromancer.

Heller married one of his pupils, the daughter of a wealthy Washington resident and would eventually return to New York. Deciding to try his magic act again, Heller abandoned the accent and image of before and focused on the presentation of his illusions. His tour that spanned from 1869 to 1875 became a success throughout much of the United States, Great Britain, Europe, and Asia. Heller's success prompted fellow magician Harry Kellar to change his name as to avoid the impression that he was copying the greatness of Heller.

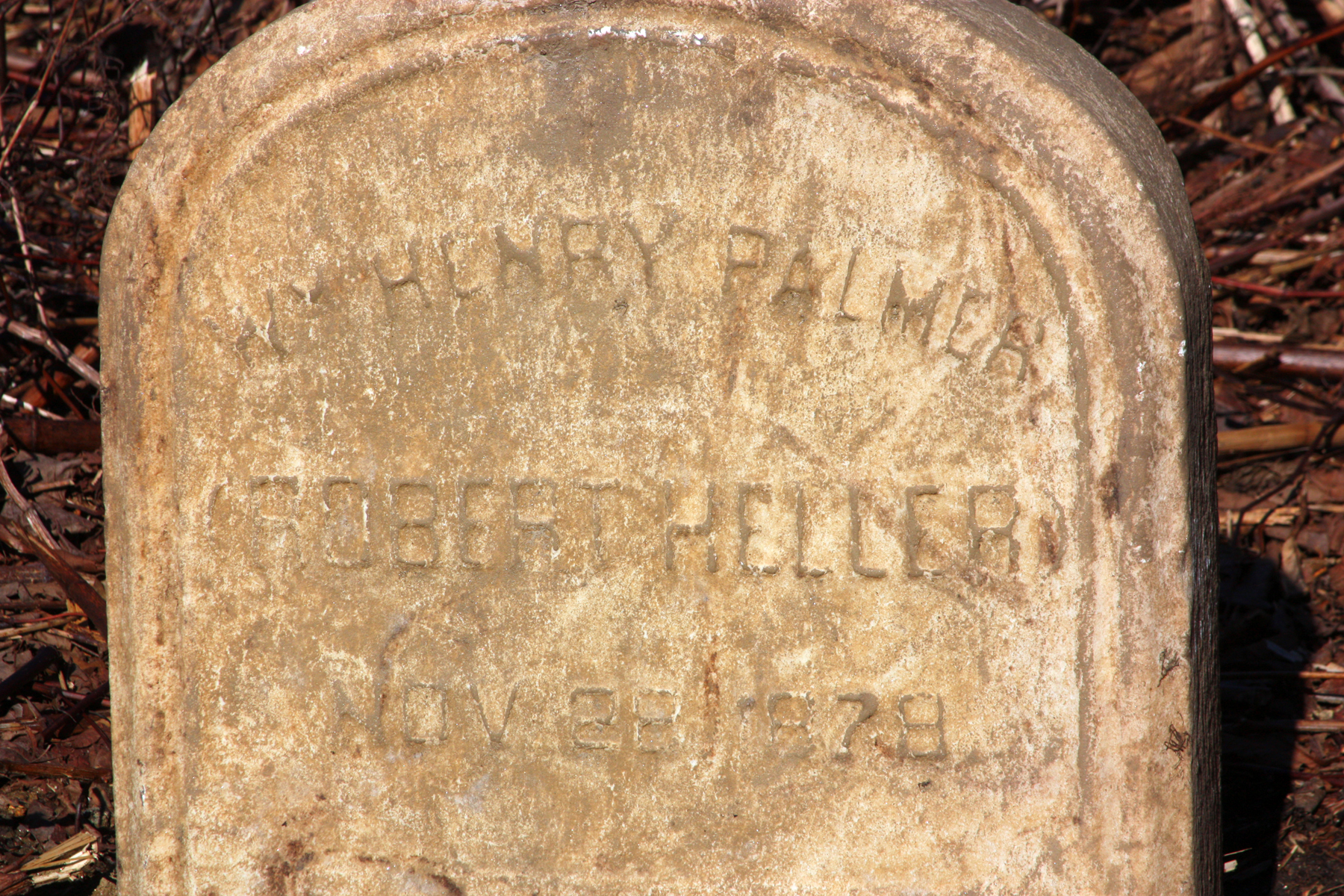
Robert Heller tombstone in Mount Moriah Cemetery

Heller retired from magic after his successful tour. He spent the remaining years of his life performing and teaching piano in Washington, D.C. In 1878, Heller died suddenly of pneumonia in Philadelphia, United States and was buried in Mount Moriah Cemetery in Yeadon, Pennsylvania.

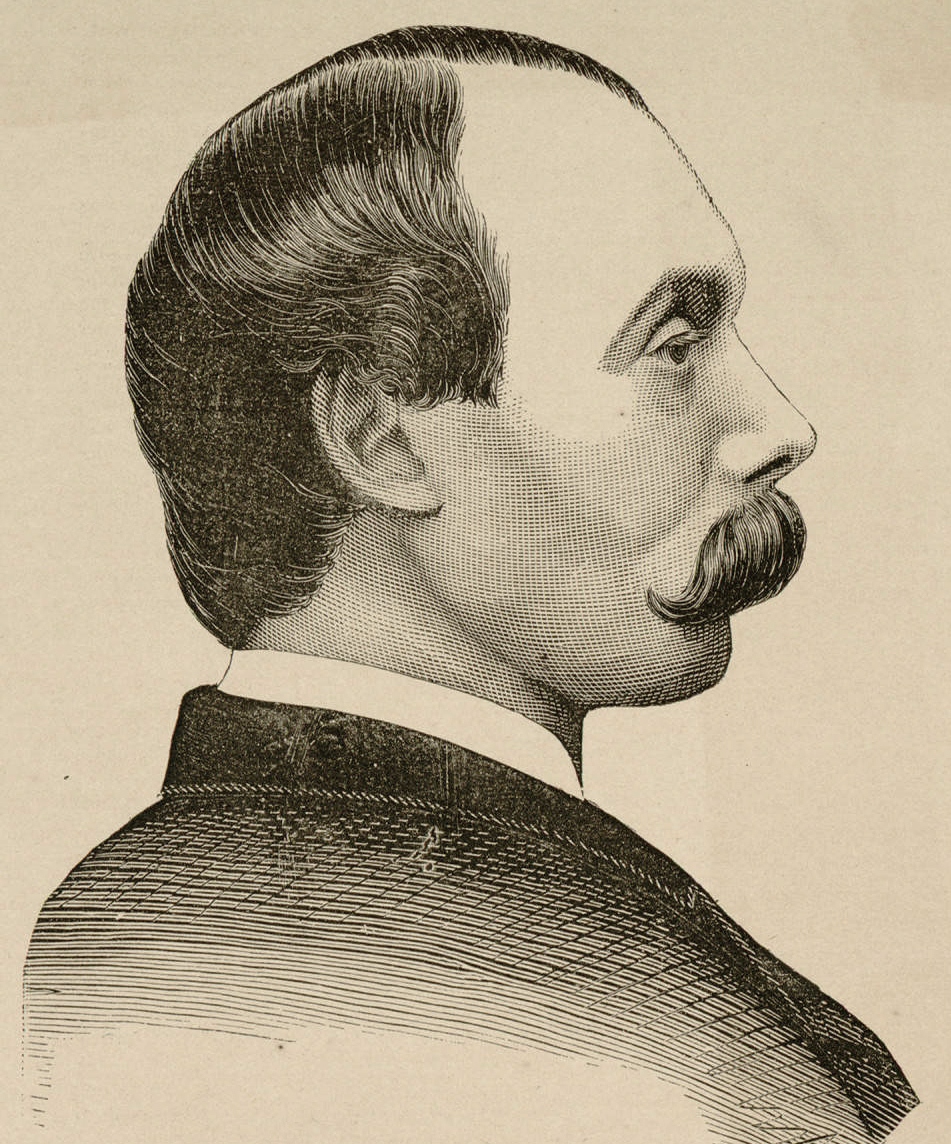
Illustration of Heller, clipped from unidentified magazine dated Jan. 22, 1853.
