= Al Flosso =

American magician and entertainer (1895–1976)

Albert Levinson
- Born: October 10, 1895; Brooklyn, New York
- Died: May 13, 1976 (aged 80); New York City
- Other names: Al Flosso, The Coney Island Fakir
- Occupation: Magician
- Known for: Stage performer, magic store owner

Albert Levinson (better known by his stage name Al Flosso; October 10, 1895 – May 13, 1976) was an American magician and entertainer.

== Career ==
Levinson was born in Brooklyn, New York, and took his stage name from a vernacular or slang term for cotton candy: "floss". At 14, Flosso was working in circuses and carnivals around the United States. He soon became a resident performer at a sideshow at Coney Island, where he also performed Punch and Judy puppet shows. Flosso was originally billed as "The Boy Magician", but later became known as "The King of Koins" after perfecting the "Miser's Dream" illusion of producing numerous coins out of thin air and dropping them with a loud clang into a bucket. Flosso later became known as the "Coney Island Fakir". Flosso was skilled with close-up magic and cardistry, in addition to stage magic.

In 1939, Flosso bought Martinka & Co., the oldest magic shop in the United States, which had also once been owned by Harry Houdini. The shop became known as Flosso-Hornmann Magic. During the time he ran the shop, Flosso was still a professional performer, making appearances on The Ed Sullivan Show. He also made a brief appearance in the 1931 Marx Brothers film Monkey Business.

American artist, actor, and ventriloquist's dummy maker Alan Semok credits Flosso as one of his key mentors because as a result of Flosso's encouragement, guidance, and recommendations, Semok was able to begin selling his handmade figures (as early as 1967 at the age of 15) to professional performers through The Tannen Magic Co. (also located in New York City), as well as in Flosso's own famous shop on West 34th Street.

The New York Times described the Flosso's Magic Shop as, "a messy Aladdin's cave of magical marvels from trick cards and ropes to a live lion that one owner, the magician Carter the Great, kept in the back room. It was also an atmospheric fraternity house where a visiting European magician, a superstar like David Copperfield and a curious teenager from Queens might rub elbows, ideas and magic wands. The younger and older Flosso held court on an old sofa, both making smart comments in an accent not unlike that of W. C. Fields.

== Later life and death ==
Levinson died in New York City in 1976. Following his death, Martinka Magic, which is still in operation, was taken over by his son, Jack Flosso, also a magician, who died in 2003.
