= Linking rings =

Linking rings may refer to:

- Chinese linking rings, a classic magical illusion
- The Linking Ring, the monthly magazine of the International Brotherhood of Magicians
