= The Linking Ring =

Journal

- Cover from May 1962, featuring Okito
- Categories: Magic
- Frequency: Monthly
- Founder: Ernest K. Schieldge Gene Gordon
- First issue: 1922; 104 years ago
- Company: International Brotherhood of Magicians
- Country: USA
- Based in: Bluffton, Ohio
- Website: The Linking Ring
- ISSN: 0024-4023

The Linking Ring is a monthly print magic magazine published by the International Brotherhood of Magicians (IBM) for its members since 1922. It is based in Bluffton, Ohio. In 2007, Samuel Patrick Smith, a magician, author and publisher based in Eustis, Florida, became executive editor of the magazine.

== List of Magicians featured on the cover of past issues ==
- Joe Berg
- David Berglas
- Eugene Burger
- John Calvert
- Bev Bergeron
- Robert Chambers
- Juliana Chen
- Wilton "Wil Staar" Clements
- Robert C. Dowd
- Dr. Robert A. Escher, Jr.
- Nelson Hahne
- Justin Flom
- Mike Gancia
- Martin Gardner
- Eugene Gloye
- Joshua Jay
- Kristen Johnson
- George Johnstone
- Mel Kientz
- Milt Kort
- Stan Kramien
- Louis Martelle
- Mike Makman (aka Professor Putter)
- Max Maven (aka Phil Goldstein)
- Jeff McBride
- Johnny Ace Palmer
- Bill Pitts
- Jon Racherbaumer
- Richard J. Weibel
- Mac King (caricatured)
- Dale Salwak
- Harold Adrian Smith
- Cindy Spencer
- Joe M. Turner
- Harold Twaddle
- Herb Zarrow
- Mr Bottle

=== Notes ===
- Nelson Hahne did not actually appear on the cover of the December 2007 Linking Ring, but rather an illustration drawn using his style appears on the cover of that issue. The "Cover Story" within that issue, however, discusses the life and contributions of Mr. Hahne to the magic world.
- Kristen Johnson followed in the footsteps of her mother Sunny Johnson, who appeared on the cover in March 2002.

== Monthly Features/Columns ==
- Hocus In Focus is the journal review section, listing reviews of a wide array of books, marketed effects and utility devices as well as magic related videos.
- Our Side of the Pond
- Come A Little Closer A column which ran during the 1970s, heavily focused on close up magic; written by Rick Johnsson.
- The Expert at the Tech Table
- The President's Page
- Hocus Pocus Parade is the title of a regular column which appears in The Linking Ring, published by The International Brotherhood of Magicians. Although the table of contents usually lists the specific contributing magician's name (e.g. "Max Maven One Man Parade"). the column itself is still named Hocus Pocus Parade.
- Ring Reports is a collection of monthly reports, submitted by the Ring Reporters for each respective IBM Ring.
- Situationally Yours
- Memoirs of a Magician's Ghost: The Autobiography of John Booth
- Marcom...from the table of my memory
- Potter's Bar – a series of columns included 1952–1969 by Jack Potter giving bibliographic references to periodical and book descriptions of magical effects by category. They were later collected and published as The Master Index to Magic in Print.

== Editors Emeriti ==
- Phil Wilmarth (also served as Assistant Editor)
- Howard Bamman
