= Joe M. Turner =

American magician

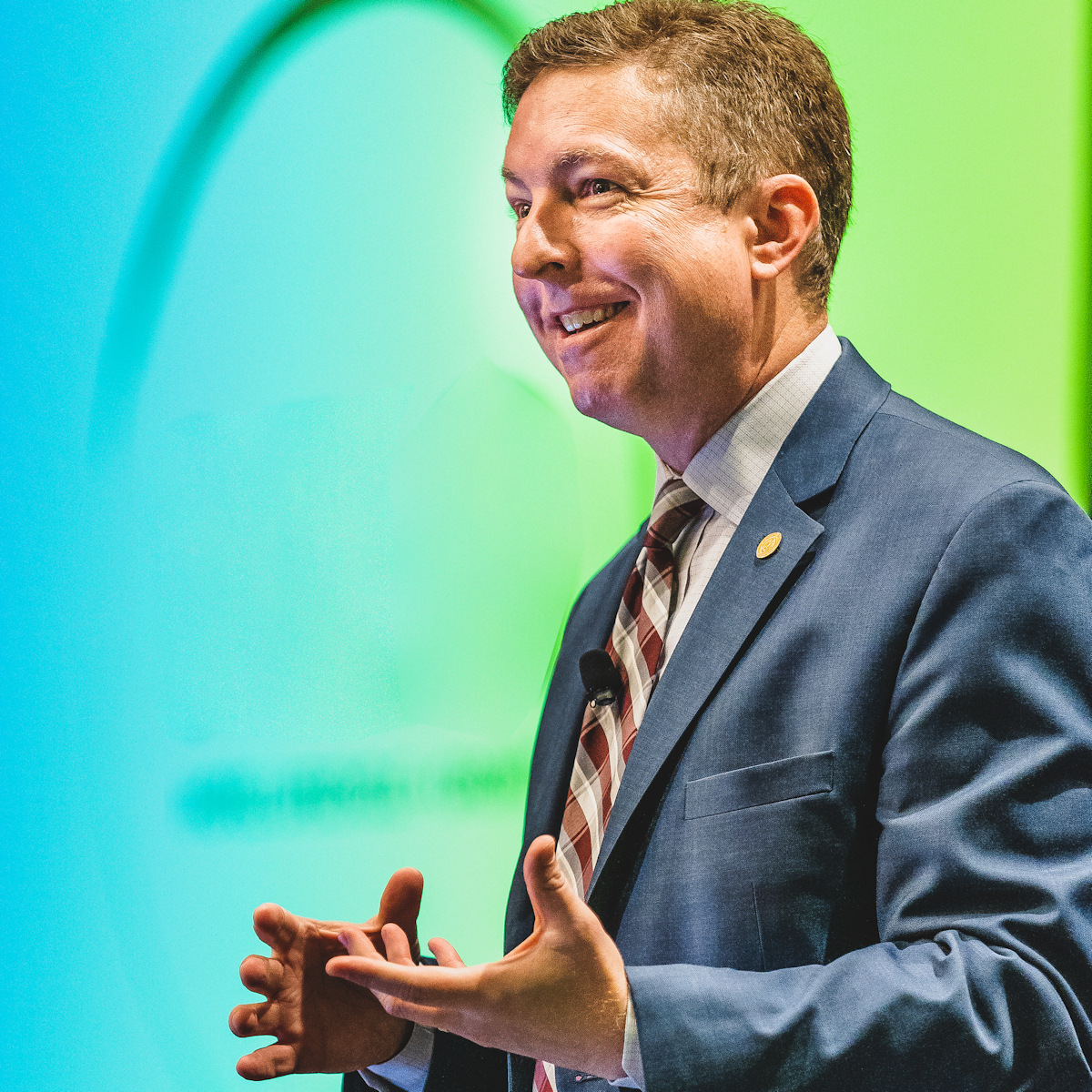
- Joe M. Turner keynoting at a conference.
- Born: Jackson, Mississippi, U.S.
- Education: Mississippi State University (1992)
- Occupations: Magician, mentalist, speaker
- Website: http://www.turnermagic.com

Joe M. Turner is an American corporate magician, mentalist, and a frequent keynote speaker at conferences and other gatherings. He has appeared on CNN and network television programs in Europe and South America.

== Biography ==
Turner attended Mississippi State University where he was awarded one of the first Schillig Leadership Scholarships. He later wrote and composed the stage musical BankNote$.

He serves on the selection committee for the Mississippi State University distinguished scholars program, which encompasses the original Schillig program plus other subsequently endowed scholarships.

=== Career ===
Turner was engaged by CMI (a division of Clear Channel Entertainment), The Coca-Cola Company, and Reading is Fundamental to design, write, direct, and train performers to use magic in a project to promote literacy among school-age children.

In addition to his corporate work, Turner starred in an ongoing one-man magic cabaret show in Atlanta's Buckhead district from 2005 through 2008. The show, Shenanigans, was presented at the Grand Hyatt Atlanta and was highlighted as a favorite by former Atlanta mayor Sam Massell.

== Awards and honors ==
Turner served as the 2015-2016 International President of the International Brotherhood of Magicians.
