= Magigram =

- Editor: Ken de Courcy
- Publisher: Supreme Magic
- First issue: September/October 1966
- Final issue Number: February 1995; Vol 27 No 6 (306)

Magigram was a magic magazine published by Supreme Magic in Bideford, England from September 1966 – February 1995. It started as a bimonthly magazine but became monthly in September 1971. It was edited for its whole run by Ken de Courcy. A complete file contains 306 issues and over 20,000 pages.
