= Master Index to Magic in Print =

The Master Index to Magic in Print, commonly known as the Potter Index, is a set of 14 volumes and 10 supplements giving references to published books and periodical articles describing most known magic effects. It was compiled by the stage magician Jack Potter, and originally published from December 1952 as parts known as "Potter's Bar" in The Linking Ring, ending with the publication of an index of all published sections in the September 1969 issue. The sections were compiled and published along with a number of supplements by Micky Hades Enterprises. It was also published in loose-leaf format.
