= The Sphinx (magazine) =

Monthly magazine (1902–1953)

- The cover of the first issue
- Frequency: Monthly
- Founder: William J. Hilliar
- First issue: March 1902
- Final issue Number: March 1953; 597

The Sphinx (subtitled: An Independent Magazine for Magicians) was a monthly magic magazine published in Chicago from March 1902 through March 1953 by William J. Hilliar.

== History and profile ==
The magazine was started in Chicago by William Hilliar and moved to Missouri in 1904 when a Kansas City physician, A. M. Wilson, took over as editor (Vol. 3 No. 8). The number of pages per issue varied from twelve to fifty or more.

In 1906, Houdini started his own magazine Conjurers' Monthly Magazine in competition to The Sphinx, but it went out of business after only two years.

During the 28 years of Dr. Wilson's ownership, the magazine covered one of the golden ages of magic. Vaudeville was at its height, bringing a variety of magicians from all over the world to the larger cities of North America.

The Sphinx has a long history of association with the Society of American Magicians (S.A.M). In November 1902, it became the 'Western Organ' of S.A.M. In March 1909 it became the 'Official Organ' of S.A.M. From October 1927 – February 1942 and July 1947 – June 1951, S.A.M's M-U-M periodical was published as part of The Sphinx.

When Wilson died in April 1930, William Larsen had entertained hopes of taking over The Sphinx. Instead, that honor went to John Mulholland of New York.

Theodore Annemann's attempts to buy The Sphinx in 1938 can be seen in his Jinx magazine.

Some of the many contributors over the years were: Annemann, Al Baker, Milbourne Christopher, Joseph Dunninger, Robert Harbin, Ed Marlo, John Scarne, Harlan Tarbell and Martin Gardner (his first publication, at age 16).

A complete set would contain 52 volumes, 597 issues, and almost 17,000 pages.

== Editors ==
- Vol. 1 – No. 1 to 7 : William J. Hilliar.
- Vol. 1 – No. 8 to 9 : The Sphinx Publishing Company.
- Vol. 1 – No. 10 to Vol. 3 – No. 2 : M. Inez (E. M. Vernelo)
- Vol. 3 – No. 2 : M. Inez (E. M. Vernelo) A. M. Wilson, M. D., associate editor.
- Vol. 3 – No. 8 – Vol 29 No. 2 : A. M. Wilson, M. D.
- Vol 29 – No. 3 – Vol 52 : John Mulholland

== See also ==
- List of magic publications
