= Howard Thurston =

American magician (1869–1936)

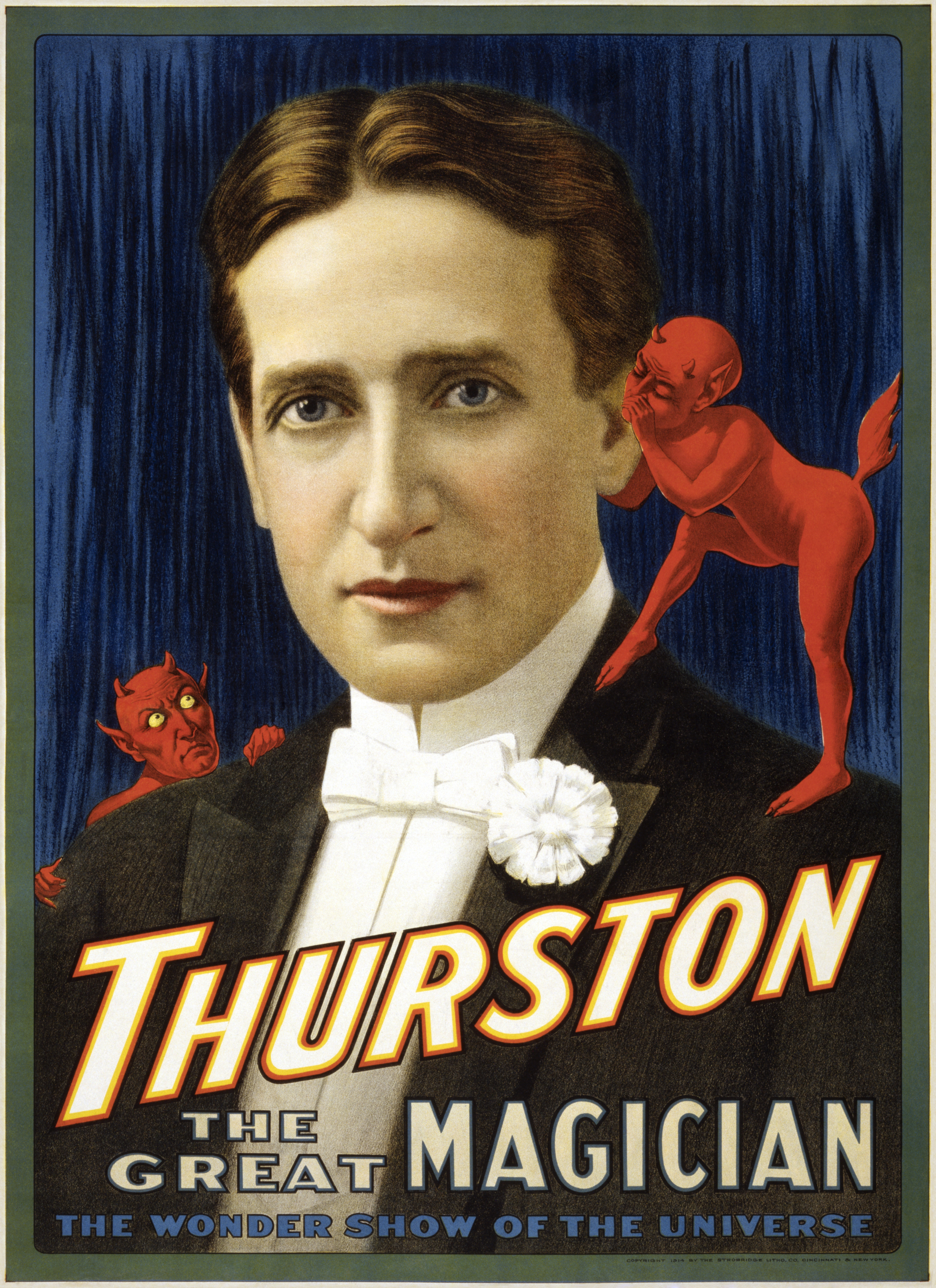
- 1914 promotional poster
- Born: July 20, 1869; Columbus, Ohio, United States
- Died: April 13, 1936 (aged 66); Miami Beach, Florida, United States
- Occupation: Magician

Howard Thurston (July 20, 1869 – April 13, 1936) was a stage magician from Columbus, Ohio who gained notoriety for his card magic and levitation illusions, amongst other tricks. As a child, he ran away from home and was taken in by performers of a traveling circus, where his future professional partner Harry Kellar also performed; Kellar became a mentor to Thurston as well as his performing partner, and named Thurston his successor upon his retirement.

Thurston eventually became the most famous magician of his time. Thurston's traveling magic show was so large that it needed eight train cars to transport his road show.

== Early life ==
Howard Thurston was born June 24, 1867, in Columbus, Ohio. He was the middle son of William and Margaret Thurston. His father William Henry Thurston was a wheelwright and carriage maker who served briefly as a private during the Civil War in the Third Ohio Regiment. His mother Margaret (Cloude), was the daughter of an Ohio farmer. He attended Mount Hermon School for Boys in Northfield, Massachusetts, class of 1893. Among his fellow students were Lee de Forest, "The Father of American Radio," and musical humorist Charles Ross Taggart, "The Old Country Fiddler."

When he was a child, Thurston practiced sleight of hand, but his mother viewed this as "devil's work". She later sent Thurston away to undertake Bible studies. Eventually, Thurston saw one of Alexander Hermann's shows, which led to Thurston's decision to begin his career as a magician.

== Career ==
Thurston said, "The historian of magic can trace an unbroken line of succession from the Fakir of Ava in 1830 to my own entertainment."

=== The King of Cards ===
Thurston received recognition and acclaim for his work with playing cards. According to legend, a Mexican magician appeared at a magic shop owned by Otto Maurer in New York City. The enigmatic magician demonstrated how he could make cards disappear, one by one, at his fingertips.

Maurer showed Thurston the move, which he would later feature in his act. He added the "Rising Cards" trick from Professor Hoffman's Modern Magic, the book from which Thurston had learned the rudiments of magic. For this trick, he would walk into the audience and ask several people to choose cards from a deck of cards. The deck was shuffled and placed into a clear glass. Thurston would then call for the chosen cards. One by one the cards would rise up to the top of the deck.

Thurston arranged an impromptu audition with Leon Herrmann, nephew of Alexander Herrmann. His performance fooled Leon. From that point on he called himself "The man that fooled Herrmann" and used the publicity to get booked into top vaudeville houses in the U.S. and Europe, billing himself as the King of Cards.

=== Levitation illusion ===
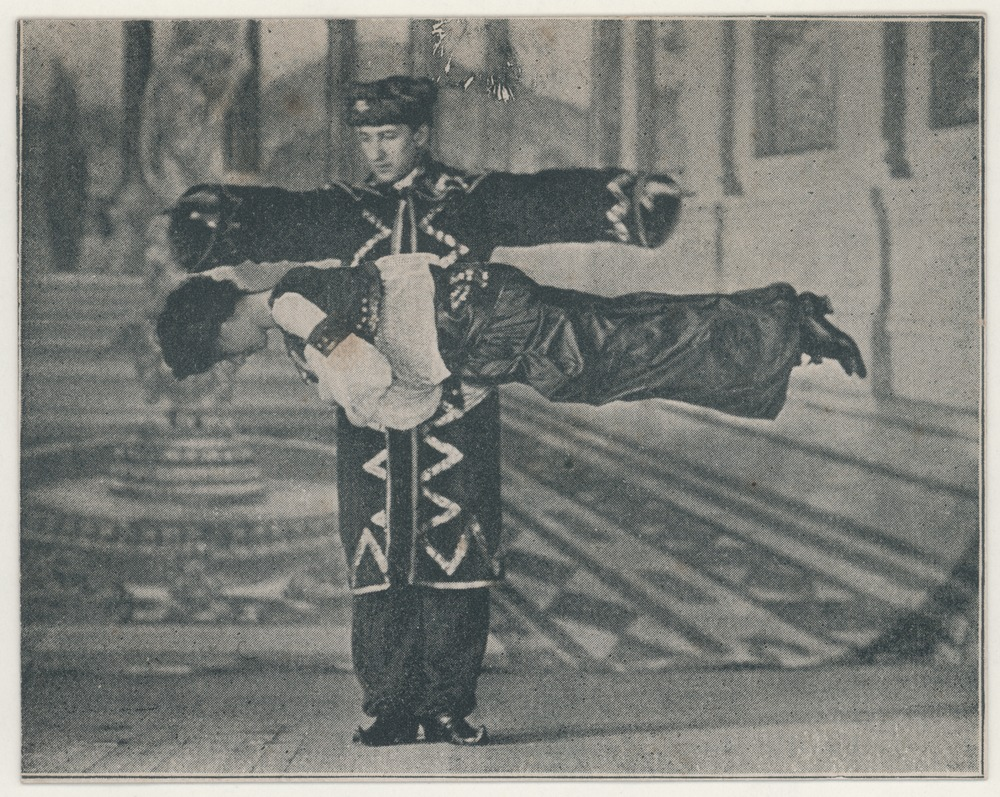
Thurston performing a levitation illusion

Thurston became well known for performing a floating lady illusion known as the "Levitation of Princess Karnac". The illusion was originally performed by John Nevil Maskelyne and most famously by Harry Kellar. Magic historian Jim Steinmeyer has written that "In Thurston's hands, the Levitation of Princess Karnac became a masterpiece. The beautiful trick was perfectly suited to Thurston's lyrical baritone." By 1908, the levitation illusion was sought by famous magicians. It was duplicated by Charles Joseph Carter on a world tour and had interested the magician Chung Ling Soo.

== Later years ==
Thurston continued presenting the Thurston–Kellar Show following the retirement of Kellar. He continued presenting for about thirty-five years until, on March 30, 1936, he suffered a stroke from a cerebral hemorrhage. He died on April 13 at his Oceanside apartment in Miami Beach, Florida. His death was attributed to pneumonia. He is entombed at Green Lawn Abbey, a mausoleum in Columbus, Ohio, which opened again to the public in 2021 after more than fifty years.

== Legacy ==
Thurston is quoted as a subject matter expert in Dale Carnegie's book How to Win Friends and Influence People. He appears in Part Two, Chapter One ("Do This and You'll Be Welcome Anywhere"), on pages 67–68 of the original text.

A poster for Thurston can be seen in many episodes of the TV show The Magicians hanging on the wall of the protagonists' student house. The poster's placement in the show could be interpreted as a hint that Thurston was a student of the school and therefore a practitioner with supernatural abilities, rather than a master of sleight of hand and master of known conjuring tricks.

The Italian illusionist and author Marc Casellato produced, directed, and presented a docu-series ("The Other Side of Magic") about the evolution of magic as an art form, with the first episode focused exclusively on Thurston's impact.

== Publications ==
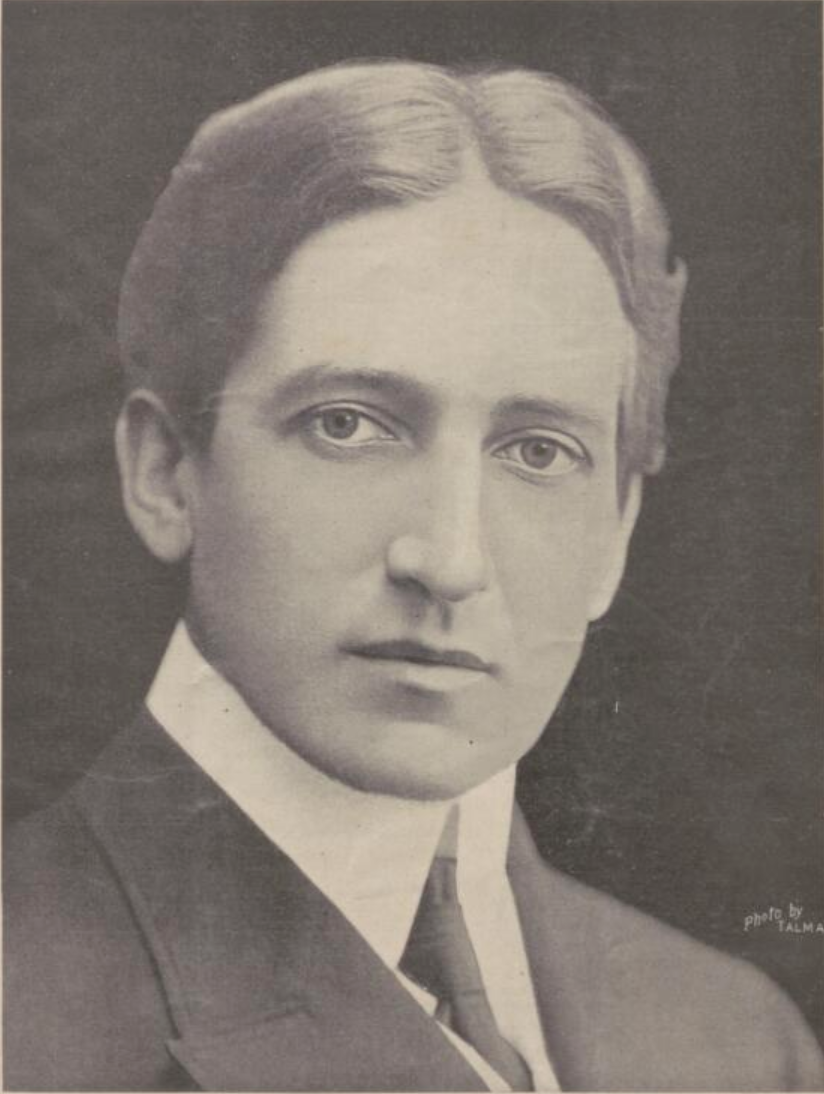
Howard Thurston in 1905

Articles

- Revealing the Mysteries of Magic, an exposure of the methods of the Egyptian conjuror Tahra Bey. The Day (January, 1926)
- Thurston, Howard. The Truth About Indian Magic. Popular Mechanics (April, 1927)
- Thurston, Howard. Magic and How It Is Made. Popular Mechanics (October, 1927)

Books

- Howard Thurston's Tricks With Cards (1903)
- 50 New Card Tricks (1905)
- Thurston's Easy Pocket Tricks: The A-B-C of Magic (1915)
- The Mishaps of Magicians (1927)
- Fooling Millions (1928)
- Tales of Magic and Mystery (1928)
- My Life of Magic (1929)
- 400 Tricks You Can Do (1940)
