= International Brotherhood of Magicians =

Organization

- Formation: February 10, 1922; 104 years ago
- Type: Non-profit
- Headquarters: St. Charles, Missouri, US
- President: Jason Michaels
- Website: www.magician.org

International Brotherhood of Magicians (I.B.M.) is an organization for both professional and amateur magicians, with approximately 15,000 members worldwide. The headquarters is in St. Charles, Missouri. There are over 300 local groups, called Rings, in more than 88 countries, largely concentrated in cities of the United States and Canada. The organization publishes a monthly periodical entitled The Linking Ring, which features tricks, coverage of shows and events in the magic community, and interviews with magicians.

== History ==
The organization was founded February 10, 1922 in Winnipeg, Manitoba by Len Vintus (stage name of Melvin Justus Given McMullen) of Transcona, Manitoba, which would later amalgamate with Winnipeg. Gene Gordon (a.k.a. Gordon Avery) of Buffalo, New York, and Don Rogers (a.k.a. Ernest Schieldge). Unlike earlier magic clubs, such as the Society of American Magicians (S.A.M.) in the United States and The Magic Circle in England, the I.B.M. was begun by magicians living outside the major cities, who were unable to attend magic club meetings, and who kept in contact by post.

Gene Gordon established the first local group in Rochester, New York. This original chapter eventually disbanded. When St. Louis, Missouri magician, Andrew Buel, suggested that the current chapters be called "Rings," the idea was adopted, and St. Louis was awarded the designation of Ring 1. Since then, a new club, Ring 4, formed in Rochester.

The I.B.M. holds an annual convention, usually in June or July. Although the S.A.M. and the Magic Circle held banquets as early as 1905, the I.B.M. was the first to hold a magic convention, in Kenton, Ohio, on June 9–10, 1926. The 66th annual convention was held in Orlando, Florida.

== Organization ==
Each international territory has a Territorial Vice President who coordinates with the Rings in that country and other Territorial Vice Presidents.

The International Brotherhood of Magicians has a number of local clubs, located throughout the world, known as Rings. Each Ring was originally numbered in sequence, based on when it received its designation from the I.B.M. once the change from "Chapter" to "Ring" was adopted.

== Membership ==
Membership is open to amateur and professional magicians, as well as those who collect magic apparatus and effects. Active members must be at least 18 years old, and youth members must be 7–17 years of age. Active members must have had an interest in magic for at least two years, or one year for youth members.

== Leadership ==
Since 1937, a new International President is elected to the I.B.M. each year.
Past presidents include:

- Len Vintus 1922–1926
- W.W. Durbin 1926–1937
- John H. Davidson 1937–1938
- T. J. Crawford 1938–1939
- John Snyder Jr. 1939–1941
- Robert C. Anderson 1941–1942
- Eugene Bernstein 1942–1946
- John Braun 1946–1947
- A. Renerick Clark 1947–1948
- H. Adrian Smith 1948–1949
- William R Walsh 1949–1950
- Walter Coleman 1950–1951
- James B. Lake 1951–1952
- Arthur D. Reichenbach 1952–1953
- Forrest P. Hendricks 1953–1954
- C. James McLemore 1954–1955
- Charles A. RossKam 1955–1956
- Chauncey Sheridan 1956–1957
- L.A. Waterman 1957–1958
- Verne W. Uker 1958–1959
- Reeder C. Hutchinson 1959–1960
- Harris Solomon 1960–1961
- C.L. Schmitt 1961–1962
- Irving Lewis 1962–1963
- Arnold Drennen 1963–1964
- Thorton Poole 1964–1965
- Dr. Richard O. Mossey 1965–1966
- Howard Bamman 1966–1967
- Sydney S. Bergson 1967–1968
- J. Ronald Haines 1968–1969
- Royal Brin Jr. 1969–1970
- William G. Stickland 1970–1971
- Austin C. Gorham 1971–1972
- Robert B. Hurt 1972–1973
- Earle J. Christenberry Jr. 1973–1974
- Charles Lantz 1974–1975
- William Preston Slusher 1975–1976
- Walter F. Williams 1976–1977
- Jeffery Atkins 1977–1978
- Bill Pitts 1978–1979
- Ray Mangel 1979–1980
- Bruce Posgate 1980–1981
- Roger Crabtree 1981–1982
- John Makar 1982–1983
- William A. Wells 1983–1984
- Donald E. Wiberg 1984–1985
- William E. Spooner 1985–1986
- Karrell Fox 1986–1987
- June Horowitz 1987–1988
- Edward A. Morris 1988–1989
- Anthony Shelley 1989–1990
- Michael Ellis 1990–1991
- Michael J. Gorman 1991–1992
- James L. Nagel 1992–1993
- R.J. Obie O'Brien 1993–1994
- Jep Hostetler 1994–1995
- Kenneth Klosterman 1995–1996
- Bev Bergeron 1996–1997
- Abb Dickson 1997–1998
- John R. Browne 1998–1999
- Jerry Schnepp 1999–2000
- Jack Greenberg 2000–2001
- Robert A. Escher 2001–2002
- Michael Stratman 2002–2003
- David Sandy 2003–2004
- Tony Wilson 2004–2005
- Roger Miller 2005–2006
- Fred Casto 2006–2007
- Phil Willmarth 2007–2008
- Joan Caesar 2008–2009
- Jack White 2009–2010
- Rolando Santos 2010–2011
- Vanni Pulé 2011–2012
- John Pye 2012–2013
- Bill Evans 2013–2014
- Shawn Farquhar 2014–2015
- Joe M. Turner 2015–2016
- Oscar Muñoz 2016–2017
- Bob Patterson 2017–2018
- Michael Finney 2018–2019
- Alex Zander 2019–2020
- Stephen Bargatze 2020–2021
- Ken Scott 2021–2022
- Billy Hsueh 2022 - 2023
- Charles Arkin 2023-2024
- Mike Dunagan 2024-2025
- Stephen Levine 2025-2026
- Jason Michaels 2026-2027

== Conventions ==
The International Brotherhood of Magicians holds annual conventions, usually in July. In 2008, 2014, and 2017, the I.B.M. and the Society of American Magicians hosted a combined convention. More than 1,900 amateur and professional magicians from around the world attended the gatherings in Louisville, Kentucky, in July 2008, in St. Louis, Missouri, in July 2014, and again in Louisville, Kentucky, in July 2017.

== Contest Awards ==
The International Brotherhood of Magicians held the world's first magic convention in 1926. Contests are held, and awards are given in several categories. Below is a listing of the First Place winners as noted in the I.B.M. Official publication, The Linking Ring. The Gold Cups and Gold Medal Awards are highly coveted and not awarded every year. Additional data for years not listed are available online and were published in the 2019 I.B.M. 91st Annual Convention souvenir program.

+ The 2021 I.B.M. Convention was held virtually due to the COVID-19 pandemic. Contests entries were selected from pre-recorded performance submissions.

| Year | 1st place Stage Adult | 1st place Close-Up Adult | 1st place Stage Youth | 1st place Close-Up Youth | People's Choice Stage | People's Choice Close-Up | Gold Cups Award | Gold Medal Award |
|---|---|---|---|---|---|---|---|---|
| 2023 | Danny King | Farren Poage | Olivier Henning | Not Awarded | Olivier Henning | Jeffrey Wang | Not Awarded | Not Awarded |
| 2022 | Artem Shchukin | Michael Bloemeke | Anja Steyn | Anja Steyn | Artem Shchukin | Michael Bloemeke | Not Awarded | Artem Shchukin |
| 2021+ | Ding Yang | Andy Deemer | Leonardo Panetti | Not Awarded | Ding Yang | Not Awarded | Not Awarded | Not Awarded |
| 2019 | Maysayo Sato | Josep Vidal | Colin Eleazer | Geno Ploeger | Maysayo Sato | Josep Vidal | Not Awarded | Not Awarded |
| 2018 | Red Star Seong | Erik Tait | Not Awarded | Not Awarded | Red Star Seong | Erik Tait | Not Awarded | Zhou-Zhou & Yuanyuan |
| 2017 | Stuart MacDonald | Omar Ferret | Not Awarded | Not Awarded | Stuart MacDonald | Jim Vines | Not Awarded | Not Awarded |
| 2016 | Jordan K. | Jim Vines | Not Awarded | Not Awarded | Jordan K. | Jim Vines | Not Awarded | Not Awarded |
| 2015 | Chris Randall | Shin Lim | Daniel Hernandez | Jolie Dreiling | Hannah Kikuchi | Shin Lim | Not Awarded | Not Awarded |
| 2014 | Hun Lee | Michael Dardant | Not Awarded | Not Awarded | Hun Lee | Shin Lim | Not Awarded | Not Awarded |
| 2013 | Ming Ya Liu | Alberto Lorenzo | Eli Portala | Drake Stanton | Ming Ya Liu | Alberto Lorenzo | Not Awarded | Not Awarded |
| 2012 | Jean Paul Olhaberry | Michael Dardant | Sebastian Zara Guarano | Not Awarded | Jean Paul Olhaberry | Michael Dardant | Not Awarded | Not Awarded |
| 2011 | Won Kuen Ha | Shin Lim | Reuben Moreland | Reuben Moreland | Won Keun Ha | Shin Lim | Not Awarded | Not Awarded |
| 2010 | Jason Andrews | Ben Jackson | Yang Yang | John Accardo | Jason Andrews | Johan Stahl | Not Awarded | Not Awarded |
| 2009 | Richard Forget | David Pietras | David Mlakar | Micah Johnson | Jei Min and Hanna | Info Not Available | Not Awarded | Not Awarded |

== See also ==
- Magic conventions
