= Society of American Magicians =

Fraternal magicians organization

- Formation: May 10, 1902; 124 years ago
- Founded at: New York City
- Members: 5,000
- National President: Matthew Crabtree
- Main organ: M-U-M
- Website: www.magicsam.com

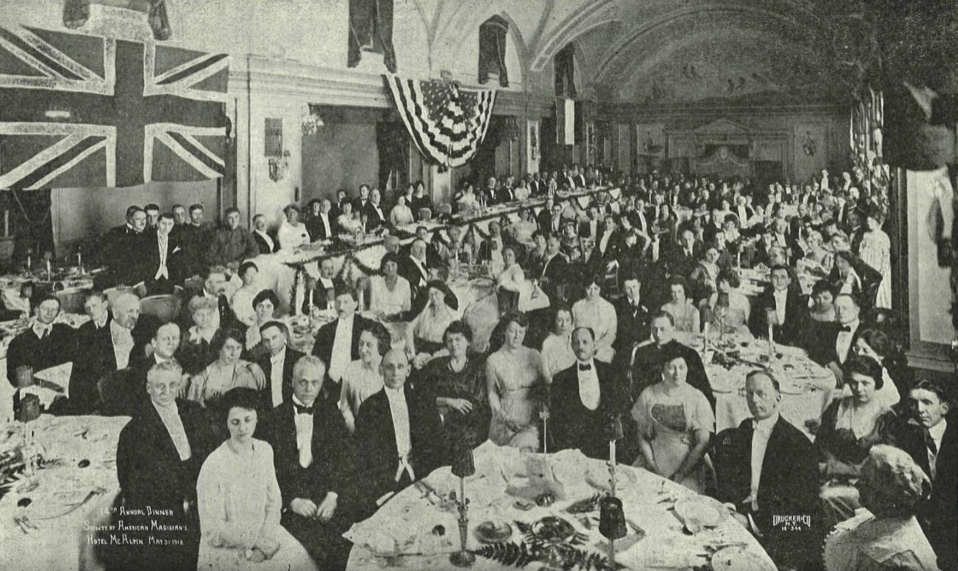
S.A.M Fourteenth Annual Dinner, 1918

The Society of American Magicians (S.A.M.) is the oldest fraternal magic organization in the world. Its purpose is "to advance, elevate, and preserve magic as a performing art, to promote harmonious fellowship throughout the world of magic, and to maintain and improve ethical standards in the field of magic." To promote these endeavors the S.A.M. presents awards and fellowships in recognition of outstanding achievement in the Art of Magic.

Membership in the S.A.M. is open to professional magicians, amateur magicians, youth magicians, magic collectors, magic historians, magic inventors, magic manufacturers and magic dealers. Over 30,000 people worldwide have been members, and currently the S.A.M. has 5,000 members worldwide. Despite the word "American" in the name, S.A.M. includes magicians from around the world. Its current National President, Matthew Crabtree (2025-26) was installed July 5, 2025.

== History ==
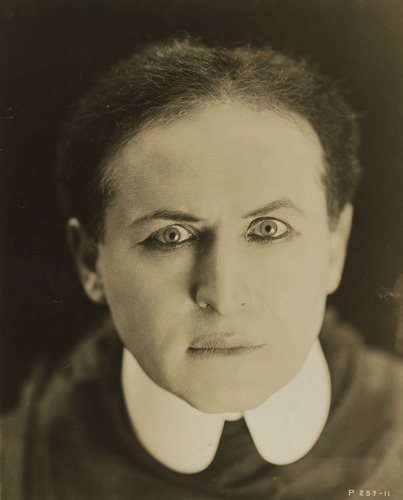
The Society grew under Harry Houdini's leadership. He is pictured here in 1920 in the middle of his tenure.

Founded on May 10, 1902, in the back room of Martinka's magic shop in New York City, by W. Golden Mortimer and Saram R. Ellison. Ellison created the name, Mortimer wrote the ritual of the order. The two of them called the meeting for the formation of the society. The Society expanded under the leadership of Harry Houdini during his term as National President from 1917–1926. Houdini sought to create a large, unified national network of professional and amateur magicians. Wherever he traveled, Houdini would give a lengthy formal address to the local magic club, making speeches, and usually threw a banquet for the members at his own expense.

For most of 1916, while on his vaudeville tour, Houdini, at his own expense, had been recruiting local magic clubs to join the SAM in an effort to revitalize what he felt was a weak organization. Houdini persuaded groups in Buffalo, Detroit, Pittsburgh, and Kansas City to join. As had happened in London, Houdini persuaded magicians to join. The Buffalo club joined as the first branch (later, an assembly) of the Society. Chicago Assembly No. 3 was, as the name implies, the third regional club to be established by the S.A.M., whose assemblies now number in the hundreds. In 1917, he signed Assembly Number Three's charter, and that charter and this club continue to provide Chicago magicians with a connection to each other and to their past. Houdini dined with, addressed, and got pledges from similar clubs in Detroit, Rochester, Pittsburgh, Kansas City, Cincinnati and elsewhere. This was the biggest movement ever in the history of magic. In places where no clubs existed, he rounded up individual magicians, introduced them to each other, and urged them into the fold. By the end of 1916, magicians' clubs in San Francisco and other cities that Houdini had not visited were offering to become assemblies. He had created the richest and longest surviving organization of magicians in the world.

The SAM now embraces over 5,000 members and almost 300 assemblies worldwide. In July, 1926, Houdini was elected for the ninth successive time President of the Society of American Magicians. Every other president has only served for one year. He also was President of the Magicians' Club of London.

Society of American Magicians Hall of Fame and Magic Museum, Los Angeles closed temporarily due to fire, contamination, and resultant litigation. After its disastrous fire, the museum's artifacts went on exhibit at the Whittier Museum for six months beginning in September 2012. The Magic Museum re-opened an exhibit at the Whittier Museum beginning January 27, 2024 and is scheduled to remain on display for the remainder of 2024.

The organization pays tribute to Harry Houdini, with a broken wand ceremony on the anniversary of his death (by the Jewish calendar) at his grave in Machpelah Cemetery in Ridgewood, Queens, New York City.

In 2023, the S.A.M. published a definitive history of the organization entitled "Magic In America: The Story of the Society of American Magicians," primarily written and researched by David Goodsell, past national president and former longtime editor of M-U-M Magazine. Goodsell died shortly after completing the book's manuscript. Author David Charvet took over the project, and the book was released during the 2023 S.A.M. Annual Conference in New Orleans.

== The Society of Young Magicians ==
The Society of Young Magicians (SYM) is an organization devoted to assisting magicians, age seven through seventeen years. The Society of Young Magicians has clubs, known as "assemblies" located throughout the world; these assemblies are commonly jointly associated with an adult SAM assembly. When a member turns 18, they have the option to graduate to full membership in the Society of American Magicians.

The purpose of the Society of Young Magicians is to promote interest in magic as a hobby that develops skill and self-confidence, the ability to speak in public, discipline that comes from learning, practicing and performing magic and a sense of service to others through helping others learn magic and by performing magic at charitable events.

The Society of Young Magicians has nearly 100 local chapters, or assemblies, around the world. Adult members of the Society of American Magicians supervise and instruct members of the SYM.

Arlen Solomon is the SYM National Director. SYM's principal means of communication among its members is its e-zine, "The Magic SYMbol."

In 2023, the S.A.M. National Council renamed the youth program SAMY, for Society of American Magicians Youth.

== Conventions ==
The S.A.M. national convention is held annually, often over the Fourth of July weekend.

== Leadership - Past National Presidents ==
* - deceased

1902-05 W. Golden Mortimer*

1905-06 John W. Sargent*

1906-08 Francis J. Werner*

1908-09 Oscar S. Teale*

1909-10 William A. Ransom*

1910-11 Elmer P. Ransom*

1911-12 Charles Roltare*

1912-14 Henry Hatton*

1914-15 Lionel M. Homburger*

1915-17 Richard Van Dien*

1917-26 Harry Houdini*

1926-27 Bernard M. L. Ernst*

1927-29 Howard Thurston*

1929-30 Theodore Hardeen*

1930-31 James C. Wobensmith*

1931-32 Werner F. Dornfield*

1932-33 Bertram E. Adams*

1933-34 William H. McCaffrey*

1934-35 William R. Walsh*

1935-36 Julien J. Proskauer*

1936-37 Irving R. Calkins, M.D.*

1937-38 Theodore T. Golden*

1938-39 Nate Leipzig*

1939-40 Eugene Bernstein*

1940-41 H. Adrian Smith*

1941-42 Richard Cardini*

1942-43 Herman Hanson*

1943-44 John B. Handy*

1944-45 Warren E. Simms*

1945-46 Raymond F. Muse*

1946-47 Bert Allerton*

1947-48 Charles C. Slayton*

1948-49 John McArdle*

1949-50 Dr. Harlan Tarbell*

1950-51 Richard DuBois*

1951-52 Austin C. Gorham*

1952-53 Leslie P. Guest*

1953-55 William R. Greenough*

1955-56 Lloyd E. Jones*

1956-57 Charles O. Schoke*

1957-58 Milbourne Christopher*

1958-59 Hugh R. Riley*

1959-60 Thomas K. Hawbecker*

1960-61 William J. McCarthy*

1961-62 Neil C. Doren, M.D.*

1962-63 George E. Mueller, M.D.*

1963-64 Edward Schneider*

1964-65 J. Ronald Haines

1965-66 James C. Johnson, M.D.*

1966-67 John U. Zweers*

1967-68 Vynn Boyar*

1968-69 Edward A. Schuman*

1969-70 Forrest F. Sample*

1970-71 Bradley M. Jacobs*

1971-72 J. Gary Bontjes*

1972-73 Edward E. Mishell*

1973-74 Richard L. Gustafson*

1974-75 William P. Dunbaugh*

1975-76 Dr. Roy Kupsinel*

1976-77 Charles W. Brigham*

1977-78 Donald E. Lea*

1978-79 Roy A. Snyder*

1979-80 Bruce Fletcher*

1980-81 James Zachary*

1981-82 Henry Moorehouse*

1982-83 Herb Downs*

1983-84 Frank W. Dailey*

1984-85 Raymond M. Corbin*

1985-86 Cesareo R. Pelaez*

1986-87 David R. Goodsell*

1987-88 William E. Andrews*

1988-89 Robert A. Steiner*

1989-90 Fr. Cyprian Murray, OFM, Cap.*

1990-91 Margaret Dailey*

1991-92 Michael D. Douglass

1992-93 George Schindler

1993-94 Dan Rodriguez

1994-95 Dan Garrett*

1995-96 Don Oltz

1996-97 Craig Dickson

1997-98 Loren Lind*

1998-99 Gary Hughes

1999-2000 Harry Monti*

2000-01 Jann Goodsell

2001-02 Warren Kaps*

2002-03 Ed Thomas*

2003-04 Jay Gorham

2004-05 John W. Apperson*

2005-06 Rich Dooley

2006-07 Andy Dallas

2007-08 Maria Ibanez*

2008-09 Bruce Kalver

2009-10 Mike Miller

2010-11 Mark Weidhaas

2011-12 Vinny Grosso

2012-13 Christopher Bontjes

2013-14 Dal Sanders

2014-15 Kenrick Ice McDonald

2015-16 David Bowers

2016-17 Jeff Sikora

2017-18 Dick Bowman

2018-19 Ron Ishimaru

2019-20 Steven Spence

2020-21 Dr. Joel Zaritsky

2021-22 Thomas Gentile

2022-23 Rod Chow

2023-24 John Sturk

2024-25 John Midgley

2025-26 Matthew Crabtree

== Publications ==
- In September 1902, Mahatma became the official publication of S.A.M.
- In November 1902, The Sphinx became the 'Western Organ' of S.A.M.
- In March 1909, The Sphinx became the 'Official Organ' of S.A.M.
- In October 1911, S.A.M. started publishing M-U-M, a monthly print magazine originally published independently until July 1927. M-U-M stands for Magic, Unity, Might, a slogan of the S.A.M.
- October 1927–February 1942 and July 1947–June 1951, M-U-M was published as part of The Sphinx.
- March 1942–June 1947, M-U-M was published as part of Genii.
- In June 1951, M-U-M became an independently published magazine again. It is still in publication.
- July 2023, the Society published Magic In America: The Story of the Society of American Magicians as a record of its own historical origins and development.

== See also ==
- American Museum of Magic
- List of magic museums
