= Indian rope trick =

Apocryphal magic trick

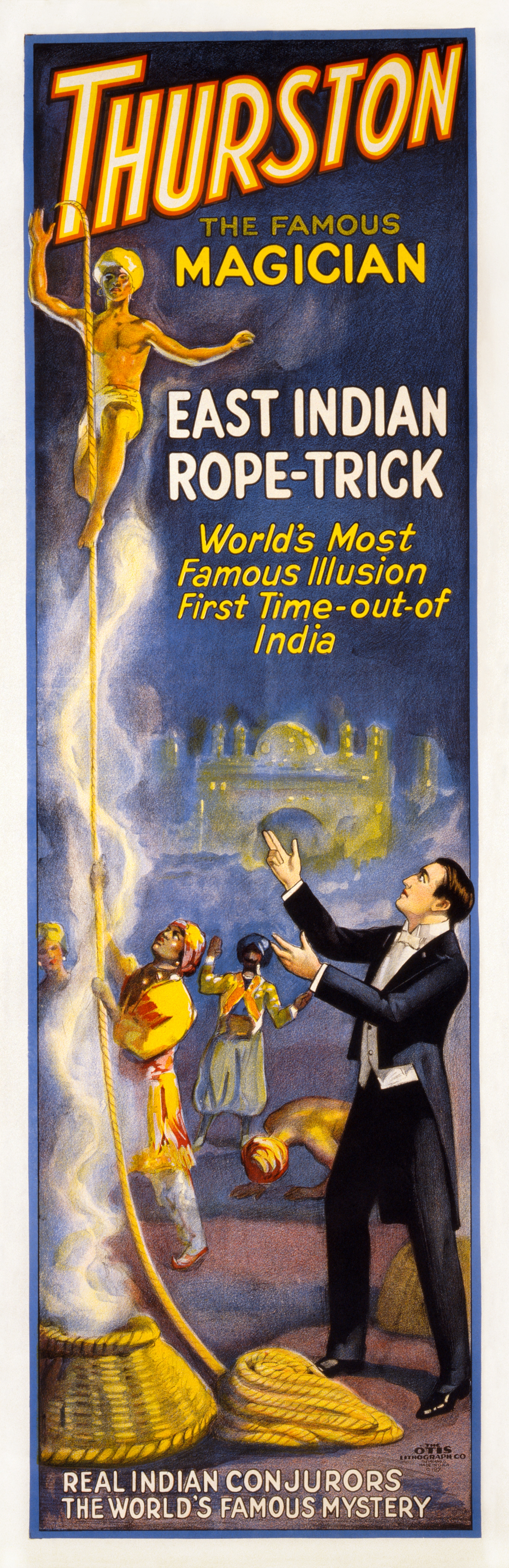
Advertisement for a reproduction of the trick by stage magician Howard Thurston

The Indian rope trick is a magic trick said to have been performed in and around India during the 19th century. Sometimes described as "the world's greatest illusion", it reputedly involved a magician, a length of rope, and one or more boy assistants.

In the 1990s the trick was said by some historians to be a hoax perpetrated in 1890 by John Wilkie of the Chicago Tribune newspaper. Magic historian Peter Lamont has argued that there are no accurate references to the trick predating 1890, and that later stage magic performances of the trick were inspired by Wilkie's account.

There are old accounts from the 9th century (by Adi Shankara), the 14th century (by Ibn Battuta), and the 17th century (by the Mughal Emperor Jahangir) of versions of the trick, but this is denied by Lamont as the accounts described are different from the "classic" Indian rope trick.

== The trick ==
There are three variants of the trick, which differ in the degree of theatricality displayed by the magician and his helper:

- In the simplest version, a long piece of rope is left in a basket and placed in an open field, usually by a fakir. The rope levitates, with no external support. A boy assistant, a jamoora, climbs the rope and then descends.
- A more elaborate version has the magician (or his assistant) disappearing after reaching the top of the rope, then reappearing at ground level.
- The "classic" version was much more detailed: the rope seems to rise high into the sky, disappearing from view. The boy climbs the rope and is lost to view. The magician calls to the boy, and feigns anger upon receiving no response. The magician arms himself with a knife or sword, climbs the rope, and vanishes as well. An argument is heard, and then human limbs fall, presumably cut from the assistant's body by the magician. When all the parts of the body, including the torso, land on the ground, the magician climbs down the rope. He collects the limbs and puts them in a basket or covers them with a cape or blanket. The boy reappears, uninjured.

Robert Elliot of the London Magic Circle, when offering a substantial reward in the 1930s for an outdoor performance, found it necessary to define the trick. He demanded that "the rope must be thrown into the air and defy the force of gravity, while someone climbs it and disappears".

== The accounts ==
In his commentary on Gaudapada's explanation of the Mandukya Upanishad, the 9th-century Hindu teacher Adi Shankara, illustrating a philosophical point, wrote of a juggler who throws a thread up into the sky; he climbs up it carrying weapons and goes out of sight; he engages in a battle in which he is cut into pieces, which fall down; finally he arises again. A few words further on Shankara referred to the principle underlying the trick, saying that the juggler who ascends is different from the real juggler who stands unseen, "veiled magically", on the ground. In Shankara's commentary on the Vedanta Sutra (also called the Brahma Sutra) he mentioned that the juggler who climbs up the rope to the sky is illusory, and so is only fancied to be different from the real juggler, who is hidden on the ground. The fact that Shankara referred to the trick's method was pointed out in 1934 in a discussion of the Indian rope trick in the Indian press. These Sanskrit texts of Shankara are the basis for the claim that the trick is of great antiquity in India.

Ibn Battuta, when recounting his travels through Hangzhou, China in 1346, describes a trick broadly similar to the Indian rope trick.

Edward Melton, an Anglo-Dutch traveler, described a performance he saw in Batavia about 1670 by a troupe of Chinese jugglers. Grasping one end of a ball of cord in his hand, a juggler threw up the ball which went out of sight, then swiftly climbed the vertical cord until he, too, was out of sight. Body pieces fell and were placed in a basket. Finally the basket was upturned, the body pieces fell out topsy turvy, and Melton "saw all those limbs creep together again", the man being restored to life. A detailed engraved illustration accompanied this account.

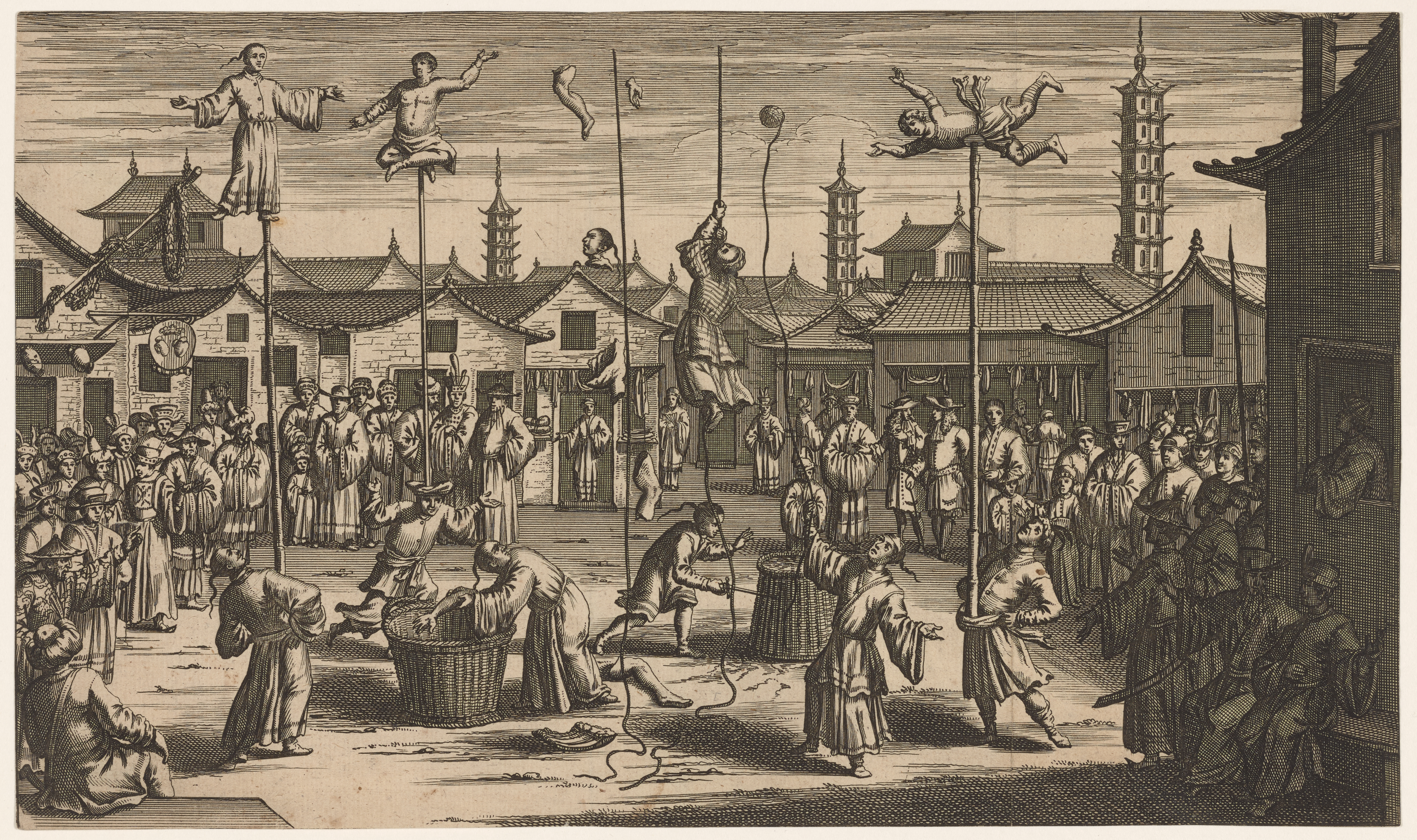
Illustration accompanying Melton's description

Pu Songling records a version in Strange Stories from a Chinese Studio (1740) which he claims to have witnessed personally. In his account, a request by a mandarin that a wandering magician produce a peach in the dead of winter results in the trick's performance, on the pretence of getting a peach from the Gardens of Heaven. The magician's son climbs the rope, vanishes from sight, and then (supposedly) tosses down a peach, before being "caught by the Garden's guards" and "killed", with his dismembered body falling from above in the traditional manner. (In this version the magician himself never climbs the rope.) After placing the parts in a basket, the magician gives the mandarin the peach and requests payment. As soon as he is paid, his son emerges alive from the basket. Songling claims the trick was a favorite of the White Lotus society and that the magician must have learnt it from them (or they from him), though he gives no indication where (or how) he learnt this.

== Skepticism ==
There has long been skepticism regarding the trick.

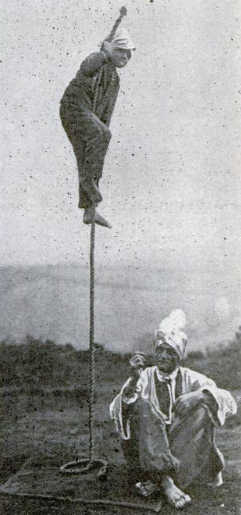
Karachi performing the Indian rope trick with his son. Magicians have suspected that the "rope" was a rigid iron shaft.

=== Demonstrations and rewards ===
In 1911, Charles Bertram reported how he had visited India and communicated with over a hundred magicians in search of the trick. According to Bertram "none of them laid any claim to being able to perform it, and when they were questioned upon the subject, disclaimed any idea of ever having seen, and in many cases, having heard of it". He offered a reward of £500 but no magician took the challenge of demonstrating the trick.

In 1917, Lieutenant Frederick William Holmes stated that whilst on his veranda with a group of officers in Kirkee, he had observed the trick being performed by an old man and young boy. The boy climbed the rope, balanced himself and then descended. The old man tapped the rope and it collapsed. This demonstration did not include the disappearance of the boy. In February 1919, Holmes presented a photograph he had taken of the trick at a meeting with members of The Magic Circle. It was examined by Robert Elliot, who stated it was not a demonstration of the Indian rope trick but an example of a balancing trick on a bamboo pole. Elliot noted that "the tapering of the pole is an absolutely clear feature and definitely shows that it was not a rope". Holmes later admitted this, but the photograph was reproduced by the press in several magazines and newspapers as proof of the trick having been successfully demonstrated. Although discredited, the photograph is considered to be the first ever taken of the trick.

In 1919, G. Huddleston, writing in Nature, claimed to have spent more than thirty years in India and known many of the best conjurors in the country, but not one of them could demonstrate the trick.

Lord Frederick Spencer Hamilton in 1921 described an alleged demonstration of the trick, told to him by Colonel Bernard. Bernard described taking photographs of the boy climbing the rope, disappearing and reappearing at a courtyard in Calcutta. However, the courtyard had been filled with dense smoke and when he had developed the photographs they revealed that "neither the juggler, nor the boy, nor the rope had moved at all". This caused Hamilton to suggest that the juggler had somehow drugged or hypnotized Bernard. Elliot criticized this second-hand account as nothing more than "hearsay evidence". He found the details and lack of witnesses suspicious, concluding that Bernard had hoaxed Hamilton.

L. H. Branson in his book Indian Conjuring (1922) wrote that "the trick has never been performed out of doors. That is to say that a rope thrown up into the air has not remained suspended in mid-air, nor has any boy ever climbed up it. That when at the top he has not disappeared and that after his appearance he did not come down in bits, covered with blood or otherwise." Branson offered £300 to anyone who could demonstrate the trick in the open.

Magicians such as Harry Blackstone Sr., David Devant, Horace Goldin, Carl Hertz, Servais Le Roy and Howard Thurston incorporated the Indian rope trick into their stage shows. However, their stage versions involved the use of curtains, mirrors and wires. The real challenge was to perform the full trick including the disappearance of the boy in broad daylight, outside in the open air. Thurston considered this to have never been achieved and in 1927 offered a reward of 5,000 rupees to anyone who could demonstrate it.

The journalist James Saxon Childers reported in 1932 that he visited India with a desire to see the trick but noted that "the first conjuror I asked about the rope trick smiled at me, the second laughed, and the third swore that the trick could not be done, had never been done, and that only the amazing credulity of the Occident nurtures the rumor".

In 1934 the Occult Committee of The Magic Circle, convinced the trick did not exist, offered a large reward to anyone who could perform it in the open air.

The American magician Robert Heger claimed to have perfected the trick over 20 years and would demonstrate it to an audience on stage in Saint Paul, Minnesota. He claimed he would perform in London to The Magic Circle if his demonstration was successful. However, his demonstration was a failure as the boy who climbed the rope was observed by the audience to have swung to the end of another rope behind a curtain.

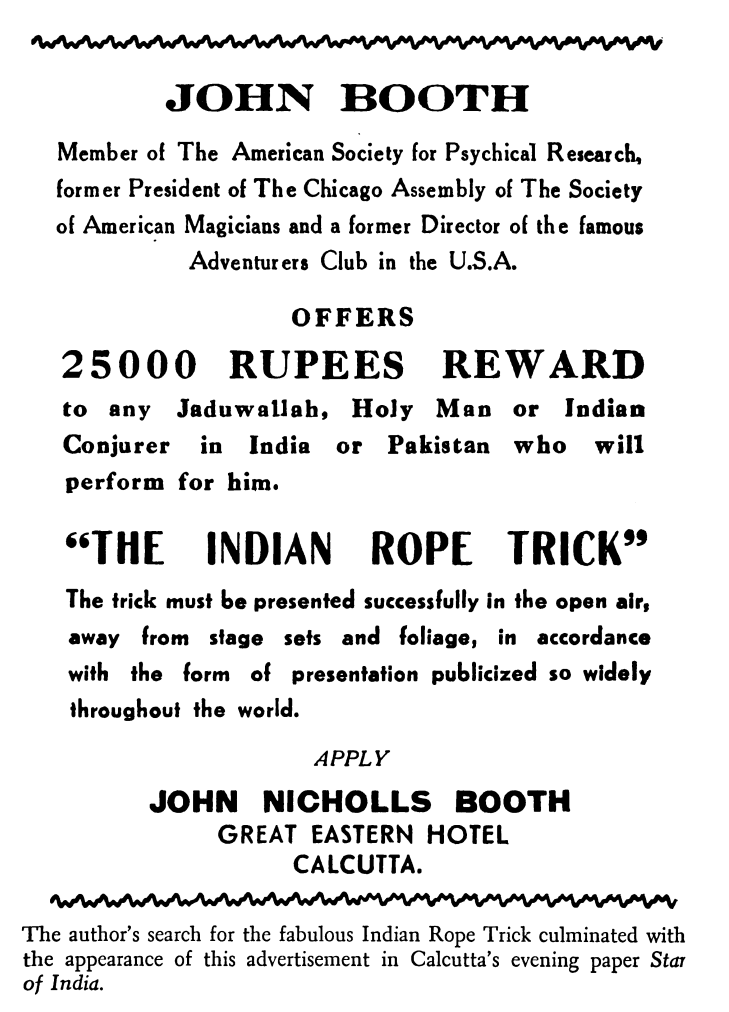
John Booth's advert offering a reward for the trick

A man named "Karachi" (real name Arthur Claude Darby), a British performer based in Plymouth, endeavoured to perform the trick with his son "Kyder" on 7 January 1935 on a field in Wheathampstead, Hertfordshire. After being granted four days to prepare the site, the presentation was filmed by Gaumont British Films. His son could climb the rope but did not disappear, and Karachi was not paid. The Occult Committee demanded the trick must include the disappearance of the boy.

In 1935, Karachi sent a challenge to the skeptics, for 200 guineas to be deposited with a neutral party who would decide if the rope trick was performed satisfactorily. His terms were that the rope shall rise up through his hands while in a sitting posture, to a height of 10 feet (3.0 m), his son Kyder would then climb the rope and remain at the top for a minimum of 30 seconds and be photographed. The rope would be an ordinary rope supplied by a well-known manufacturer and would be examined. The place could be any open area chosen by the neutral party and agreed to by the conjurers, and the spectators could be anywhere in front of the carpet on which Karachi would be seated. The conjurers of the Occult Committee refused to accept Karachi's terms.

In 1936, Jasper Maskelyne stated that he had "perfected half of an Indian rope-trick"; he could make the rope rise into the air in an open space and have a boy climb it but could not make the boy disappear. Maskelyne never demonstrated his method but offered £2,000 to anyone who could perform the full trick in open space. Nobody ever claimed this reward and he considered the full trick to be a myth, never successfully demonstrated.

In 1950, John Booth offered a reward of 25,000 rupees to any conjuror in India who could successfully demonstrate the trick. Many other rewards have been offered but all went unclaimed.

=== Examination of eyewitness accounts ===
In 1996, Nature published Unraveling the Indian Rope Trick, by Richard Wiseman and Peter Lamont. Wiseman found at least 50 eyewitness accounts of the trick performed during the late 19th/early 20th centuries, and variations included:

- The magician's assistant climbs the rope and the magic ends.
- The assistant climbs the rope, vanishes, and then again appears.
- The assistant vanishes, and appears from some other place.
- The assistant vanishes, and reappears from a place which had remained in full view of the audience.
- The boy vanishes, and does not return.

Accounts collected by Wiseman did not have any single account describing severing of the limbs of the magician's assistant. Perhaps more importantly, he found the more spectacular accounts were only given when the incident lay decades in the past. It is conceivable that in the witnesses' memory the rope trick merged with the basket trick.

Citing their work, historian Mike Dash wrote in 2000:

Ranking their cases in order of impressiveness, Wiseman and Lamont discovered that the average lapse of time between the event and witness's report of the event was a mere four years in the least notable examples, but a remarkable forty-one years in the case of the most complex and striking accounts. This suggests that the witnesses embroidered their stories over the years, perhaps in telling and retelling their experiences. After several decades, what might have originally been a simple trick had become a highly elaborate performance in their minds... How, though, did these witnesses come to elaborate their tales in such a consistent way? One answer would be that they already knew, or subsequently discovered, how the full-blown Indian rope trick was supposed to look, and drew on this knowledge when embroidering their accounts.

In 2008, a neuroscience paper suggested that the Indian rope trick may have "partially resulted from the misinformation effect".

== Explanation ==
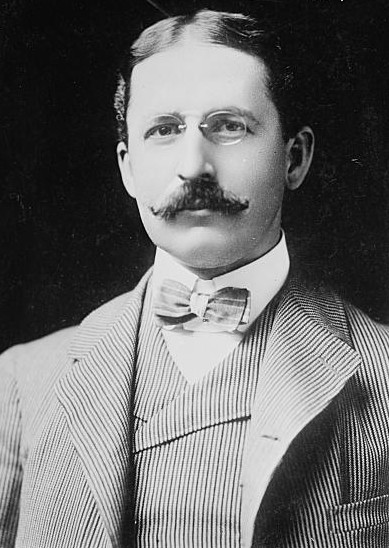
John Elbert Wilkie

=== Hoax ===
In his book on the topic, Peter Lamont claimed the story of the trick resulted from a hoax created by John Elbert Wilkie while working at the Chicago Tribune. Under the name "Fred S. Ellmore" ("Fred Sell More") Wilkie wrote of the trick in 1890, gaining the Tribune wide publicity. About four months later, the Tribune printed a retraction and proclaimed the story a hoax. The retraction received little attention, and in the following years many claimed to remember having seen the trick as far back as the 1870s. According to Lamont, none of these stories proved credible, but with every repetition the story became more widely believed despite being only a myth.

Lamont also claimed that no mention appears in writing before the 1890 article. He argued that Ibn Battuta did report a magic trick with a thong, and Jahangir with a chain, not a rope, and the tricks they described are different from the "classic" Indian rope trick. He said that the descriptions of the trick in Yule's editions (1870s) of Marco Polo's book are not in the body of the work, but in a footnote by Yule, and only refer to these non-classic accounts.

Lamont's popular but controversial work dismissed the accounts such as Shankara's and Melton's as irrelevant to his theme. This is because his book is not really about the trick itself, but about what he called the 20th-century legend of it being Indian, the fame of the trick, which peaked in the 1930s. It is this fame, chapter 8 of his book claimed, which originated from Wilkie's hoax.

=== Magic techniques ===
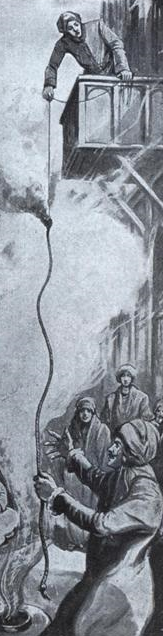
Illustration of how the trick could be performed near buildings

The magician John Nevil Maskelyne in 1912 reported a possible explanation for the trick from a witness to whom he had spoken. It was suggested that the position of the Sun was crucial to the trick:

The jugglers brought a coil of what appeared to be a large rope. As they uncoiled it and held it up it became stiff; it was evidently jointed bamboo with the joints made to lock. It was covered to look like a rope, and it formed a pole about thirty feet long. A diminutive boy, not much larger than an Indian monkey, climbed up to the top of the pole and was out of sight of the audience unless they bent forward and looked beneath the awning, when the sun shone in their eyes and blinded them. As soon as the boy was at the top of the pole the jugglers made a great shouting, declaring he had vanished. He quickly slid down the pole and fell on the ground behind the juggler who held the rope. Another juggler threw a cloth over the boy and pretended that he was dead. After considerable tom-tomming and incantation the boy began to move, and was eventually restored to life.

In 1935, Harry Price suggested that a strong sun and jointed rope could explain the trick. He translated an article by the German magician Erik Jan Hanussen who claimed to have observed the secret to the trick in a village near Babylon. According to Hanussen the spectators were positioned in front of a blazing sun and the "rope" was actually made from the vertebrae of a sheep covered with sailing cord that was twisted into a solid pole. A "smoke producing preparation", combined with the blinding sun, gave the illusion of disappearance for the boy.

Will Goldston, who was mostly skeptical, wrote that a possible explanation for the illusion of the suspended rope may have been a bamboo rod, covered with rope. Others such as P. C. Sorcar have suggested that a long horizontal thread or wire was used to support the rope. Joseph Dunninger has revealed methods of how the suspended rope could be performed by camera trickery.

Analyzing old eyewitness reports, Jim McKeague explained how poor, itinerant conjuring troupes could have performed the trick using known magical techniques. If a ball of cord is thrown upwards, one end being retained in the hand, the ball rapidly decreases in size as it rises. As it unwinds completely the illusion of the ball disappearing into the sky is striking, especially if the pale cord is similar in color to any overcast cloud. Before the cord has time to fall the climber leaps up, pretending to climb, but really being lifted by a companion. Skilled acrobats could make this quick "climb" look very effective until the climber's feet are at or even above the lifter's head. Then a noisy distraction from other members of the troupe is the misdirection needed which allows the climber to drop unseen to the ground and hide. This type of "vanishing by misdirection" is reported as having been used very effectively by a performer of the basket trick in the 1870s.

The lifter continues to look upwards and holds a conversation with the "climber" using ventriloquism to create the illusion that a person is still high in the air and is just passing out of sight. By now there is no cord or climber in the air, only an illusory climber as Shankara described (see above under "accounts"). Ventriloquism is quite capable of producing this remarkable effect, and a report from near Darjeeling by a school headmaster who witnessed the trick states specifically that ventriloquism was used. As to the falling of the pieces of the climber, according to an Indian barrister-at-law who saw a performance about 1875 which included this feature, it appears to have been produced very largely by acting and sound effects. When a magician acts out the visible catch of an imaginary deck of cards thrown by a spectator, or throws a ball in the air where it vanishes, the appearance or disappearance really occurs at the location of the magician's hand, but to most spectators (two out of three in actual testing) the magic appears to occur in mid-air. McKeague explained the falling body parts as being produced by much the same acting technique. He explained Melton's account of seeing the limbs "creep together again" (see above under "accounts") as being the result of contortionists' techniques.

It has always been the outdoor disappearance of the climber, away from trees and structures, which has led to claims the illusion is "humanly impossible". McKeague's explanation not only solves the mystery of the mid-air disappearance but also provides an alternative explanation for the Wiseman-Lamont observation discussed above that eyewitness reports were more impressive when much time had elapsed. In the late 19th and early 20th centuries as the fame of the trick increased performers would have had increasing difficulty in puzzling audiences with it, until finally the disappearance of the climber ceased to be a feature and the rare witness who had seen it spoke of a time long before. This is because misdirection of attention is extremely unlikely to be effective when the audience is expecting the disappearance, a fact which also explains why no one could claim any reward for a performance where it was specified the disappearance must be included. The increasing fame of the rope trick and the basket trick ended the possibility of using "vanishing by misdirection" in the methodologies for both tricks.

John Keel reports that he was told the secret of the trick in 1955 from an aged mystic who claimed to have performed it in the past. A horizontal wire is stretched above the site, anchored at ground points of higher elevation, rather than obvious nearby structures. The rope has a weighted hook, and an invisible thread which is draped over the wire above; when the rope is tossed upward the thread is used to pull it and hook it in place. The magician wears loose baggy clothing, in which are concealed the "body parts" that he tosses down. The boy then conceals himself inside the magician's voluminous outer garment, and clings to him as the magician climbs down seemingly alone. Keel describes his public attempt to perform a simpler version, but failing badly, according to "two articles and a cartoon that appeared in Indian newspapers".

Penn & Teller examined the trick while filming their three-part CBC miniseries Penn & Teller's Magic and Mystery Tour. According to that miniseries, the tour travelled the world investigating historical tricks, and while in India they travelled to Agra, where they recreated the trick. Penn and Teller invited two British tourists shopping nearby to see what they claimed was a fakir performing the trick. As they walked back, an assistant ran up and claimed the fakir was in the midst of the trick, so they rushed the rest of the way so they wouldn't miss it. As the witnesses neared the room they dropped a thick rope from a balcony. The witnesses saw what they thought was the end of the trick, the rope falling as if it had been in mid-air seconds before. A sheet was then removed from a boy with fake blood at his neck and shoulders, hinting that his limbs and head had been reattached to his torso. According to their account, the rumour that a British couple had witnessed the trick was heard a few weeks later in England.

== Examples of the trick ==
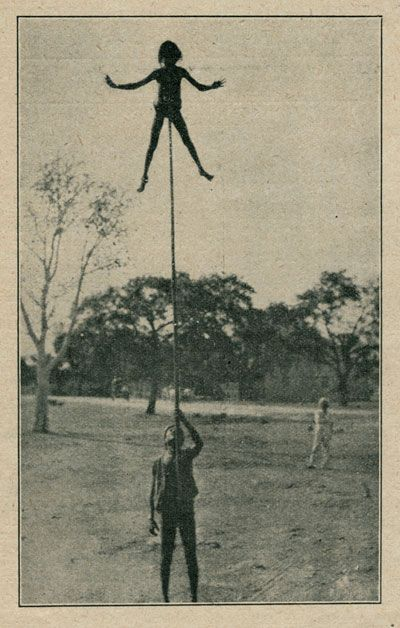
Lieutenant F. W. Holmes photograph from 1917

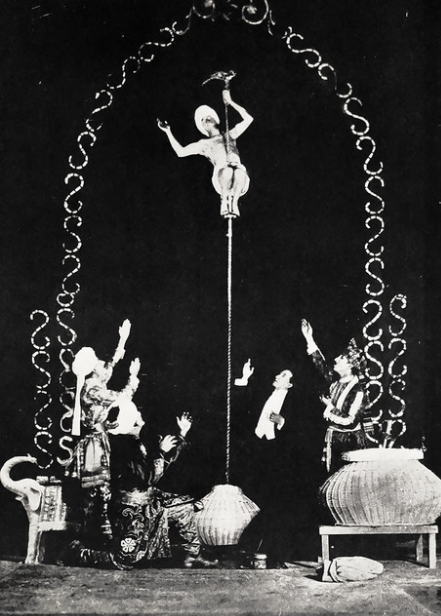
A stage recreation by Howard Thurston

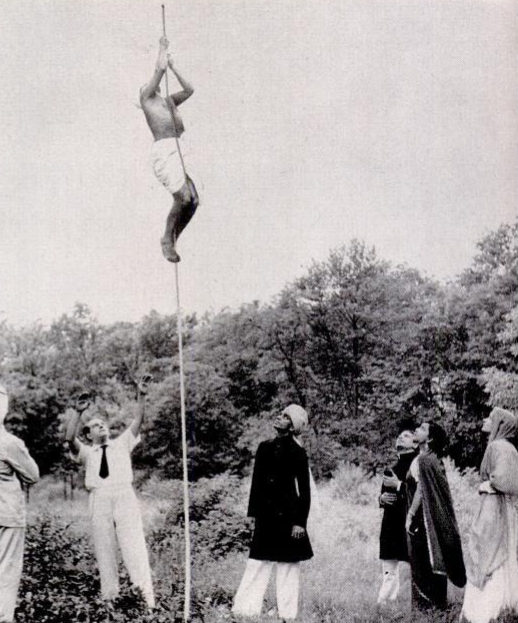
Joseph Dunninger demonstrating how the trick can be faked in pictures

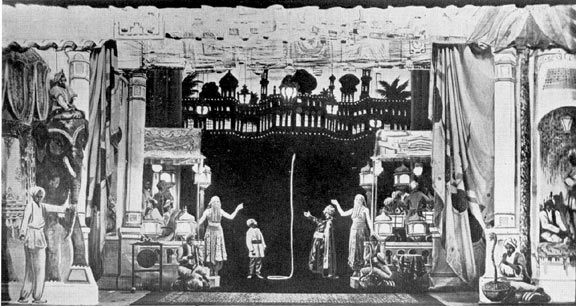
Horace Goldin performing the trick on stage

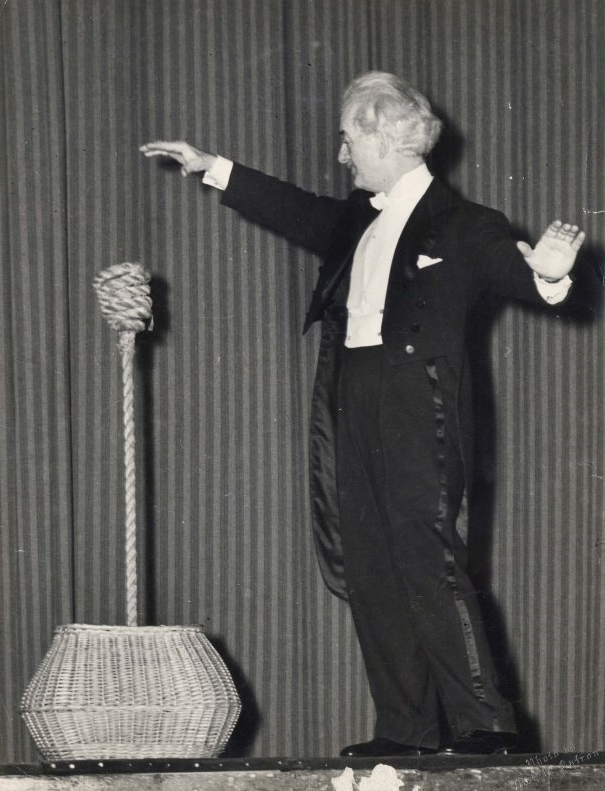
Harry Blackstone Sr. on stage c. 1948

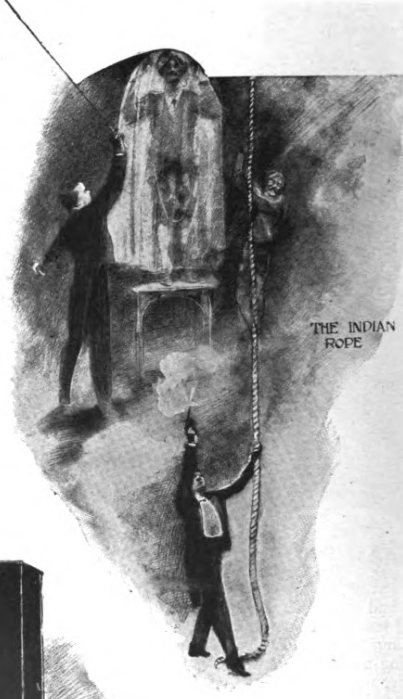
Illustration of David Devant performing the trick on stage

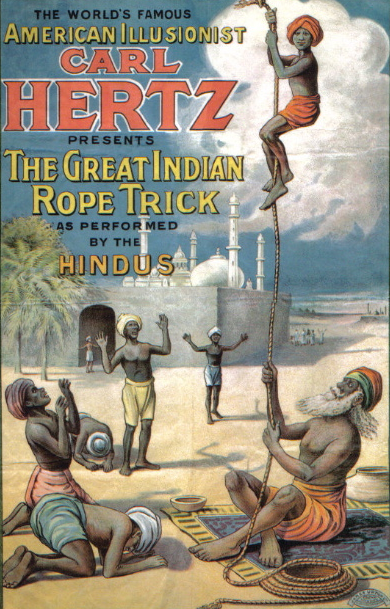
Carl Hertz "Great Indian Rope Trick" poster c. 1920
