= David Devant =

English stage magician (1868–1941)

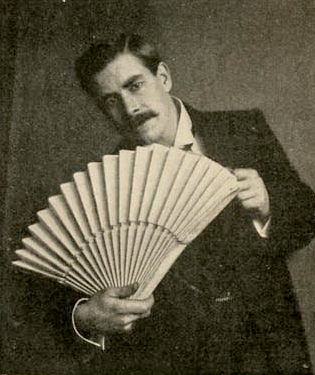
- Born: David Wighton; 22 February 1868; Holloway, London, United Kingdom
- Died: 13 October 1941 (aged 73)
- Occupation: Magician

David Devant (22 February 1868 – 13 October 1941) was an English magician, shadowgraphist and film exhibitor. He was born David Wighton in Holloway, London. He is regarded by magicians as a consummate exponent of suave and witty presentation of stage illusion. According to magic historian Jim Steinmeyer, Devant was "England’s greatest magician—arguably the greatest magician of the 20th Century".

== Magic career ==
Devant was a member of the famous Maskelyne & Cooke company and performed regularly at the Egyptian Hall.

Managed by Julian Wylie, in 1905 Devant became a partner with John Nevil Maskelyne, who was succeeded by Oswald Williams. Devant is revered by magicians as an inventor and performer whose stature led to him being invited to participate in Royal Command Performances.

He was droll, engaging and a master of grand illusion and platform magic. The wit of his patter marked a departure from the pseudo scientific style of earlier conjurors. This humour can still delight, as evidenced by stage lines he includes in the treatise he wrote with Nevil Maskelyne, Our Magic. It has been claimed that Queen Alexandra laughed aloud during Devant's "A Boy, Girl and Eggs" routine at the first of his Royal Command Performances, where an assistant from the audience was given the (losing) task of keeping track of a bewildering number of eggs plucked from an empty hat by the magician.

Among Devant's signature routines was his "Magic Kettle", which produced, on demand, any alcoholic beverage called for by the audience, and "Mascot Moth", an instantaneous vanish of a winged assistant.

Critics of Devant claim many of the items in his repertoire were elaborated sketches in which the magical element was insufficient to justify the staging. In its day, however, Devant's magic was the talk of London. He was already a top-of-the-bill music hall star when he began sharing the stage with John Neville Maskelyne in 1893. In 1904, the two moved to St George's Hall, and their official business and professional partnership was established soon afterwards. It was to prosper for ten years.

Maskelyne and Devant's House of Magic became famous all over the world, and was the showcase for the premier magicians of the day, including Paul Valadon, Charles Bertram and Buatier de Kolta. In My Magic Life, Devant says that their theatre was "the veritable headquarters of the conjurer's art".

Milbourne Christopher, in his book Magic: A Picture History, wrote that "most British magicians agree, [Devant] was the master performer of his time".

Devant was a fixture in British entertainment and it was he who was selected to represent "the world of wizardry" at King George V's command performance at the Palace Theatre in London on 1 July 1912. Devant made headlines not long after when an escaped mental patient cornered him in London and insisted that the conjurer pull coins from the air as he had been seen to do on stage. Devant did so until attendants arrived from the hospital to take the disturbed spectator away.

Elliott O'Donnell featured the pair in his 1912 occult novel The Sorcery Club. A highlight is the exposure of all their tricks by a group of *real* sorcerers.

Devant was a pioneer of early cinema in London. On 19 March 1896 Devant showed the first films ever seen in the UK. These Edison films were shown at Maskelyne’s Egyptian Hall using a film projector (known as the Theatrograph) made by R. W. Paul, two days before Paul himself demonstrated his new machine in public at Olympia. Also that year Devant began his association with the pioneer of cinematic special effects, Georges Méliès, to whom he sold a Theatrograph. Devant then toured the country showing films, and for a time became Méliès’ sole agent in Great Britain selling both his films and cameras. As well as being an early exhibitor of film, Devant appeared in three films made by Paul and another by Méliès (D. Devant, prestidigitation, 1897). Méliès also used one of Devant’s stage acts, which involved making a portrait of a woman come to life, to create his 1903 film, The Spiritualist Photographer (Le Portrait Spirite).

Devant was still at the peak of his profession when his health began to fail during the war years, until the consequences of "paralysis agitans", as he identifies it in his autobiography, forced him to retire in 1920.

According to the magician John Booth, Devant managed to fool a number of people into believing he had genuine psychic ability who did not realize that his feats were magic tricks. At St. George's Hall, London, he performed a fake "clairvoyant" act where he would read a message sealed inside an envelope. Oliver Lodge who was present in the audience was duped by the trick and claimed that Devant had used psychic powers. In 1936 Devant in his book Secrets of My Magic revealed the trick method he had used.

== Legacy ==
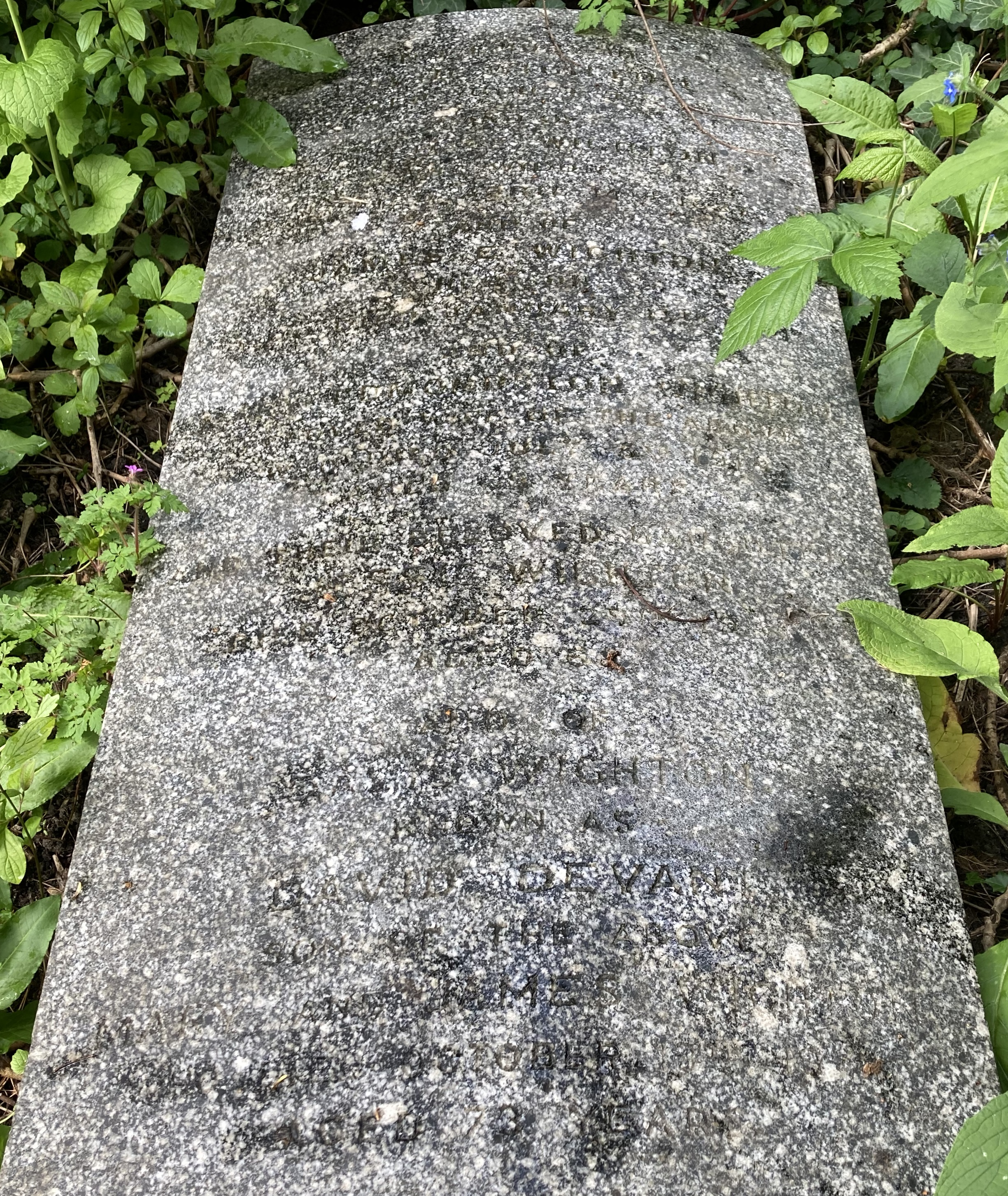
Family grave of David Devant in Highgate Cemetery

Devant is remembered as the consummate exponent of entertaining magical theatre. He was the first President of both The British Magical Society and The Magic Circle. The Magic Circle celebrates Devant by using his name for their function room in the Headquarters in London. His words about his own priorities in magic have often been quoted to budding young magicians – when confronted by a boastful magician who claimed he knew hundreds of tricks, Devant gently replied that he knew only a few dozen, but he was able to perform them very well. One of his trade mark phrases was that his magic was done "All by kindness".

The David Devant Award is an honour awarded by The Magic Circle to individuals who have significantly contributed to the art of magic or rendered notable service to the field internationally. The award takes the form of a miniature bust of Devant.

Devant was the author of several manuals on conjuring, including Our Magic: The Art in Magic, the Theory of Magic, the Practice of Magic with Nevil Maskelyne. He influenced many notable magicians, including Nate Leipzig, who said of Devant, "I basked in the performance of David Devant, one of the finest entertainers in magic I ever hope to see."

He mentored Scottish-American magician Max Holden.

He lived in Hampstead, London, where a blue plaque commemorating his residence was affixed to the house, Ornan Court on Ornan Road at the junction with Haverstock Hill, in 2005. This building was previously used as nurses accommodation for the nearby Royal Free Hospital.

The indie band David Devant & His Spirit Wife are named after him.

He died on 13 October 1941 and is buried in the west side of Highgate Cemetery.

== Publications ==
Articles

- A Conjurer’s Reminiscences. The Strand Magazine (January, 1913)
- My Illusions. The Strand Magazine (February, 1913)

Books

- Woes of a Wizard (1903)
- Our Magic: The Art in Magic, the Theory of Magic, the Practice of Magic (1911, 1946) [with Nevil Maskelyne]
- Magic Made Easy (1921)
- Lessons in Conjuring (1922)
- My Magic Life (1931)
- The Best Tricks and How to Do Them (1931)
- Secrets of My Magic (1936)

== Selected filmography ==
- D. Devant, Conjurer, 1897 by Georges Méliès
- The Great London Mystery (1920)
