= Frederick William Holmes =

English recipient of the Victoria Cross (VC)

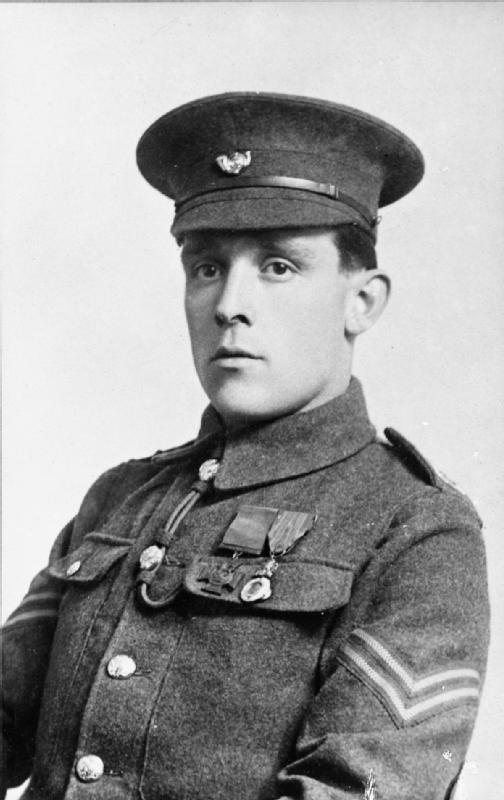
- Corporal Holmes in 1915, wearing Victoria Cross and French Médaille Militaire medals
- Born: 15 September 1889; Bermondsey, London, England
- Died: 22 October 1969 (aged 80); Port Augusta, Australia
- Burial place: Stirling North Garden Cemetery, Section 2, Row E, Grave 6, Port Augusta, South Australia
- Military career
- Allegiance: United Kingdom
- Branch: British Army
- Service years: 1907–1921
- Rank: Captain
- Units: King's Own Yorkshire Light Infantry; Green Howards; Worcestershire Regiment
- Conflicts: First World War: Battle of Le Cateau
- Awards: Victoria Cross; Médaille militaire

Frederick William Holmes VC (15 September 1889 – 22 October 1969) also known as F. W. Holmes, was a British Army officer and an English recipient of the Victoria Cross (VC), the highest and most prestigious award for gallantry in the face of the enemy that can be awarded to British and Commonwealth forces.

== Biography ==
=== Early life ===
Holmes was born on 27 September 1889 in Bermondsey, London, England. He was educated at the local school run by the London School Board. He joined the British Army on 28 September 1907, the day after his 18th birthday. In May 1914, he married Violet Imelda (née Daley); she was known as Margaret. After seven years service, he transferred to the Army Reserve. Only two weeks later, in August 1914, he was called up for active service following the outbreak of the First World War.

=== Victoria Cross ===
Holmes was 24 years old, and a lance corporal in the 2nd Battalion, The King's Own Yorkshire Light Infantry, British Army during the First World War when the following deed took place at the Battle of Le Cateau for which he was awarded the Victoria Cross (VC):

At Le Cateau on 26th August, carried a wounded man out of the trenches under heavy fire and later assisted to drive a gun out of action by taking the place of a driver who had been wounded

— London Gazette (24 November 1914)

On the first day of the Battle of Le Cateau, Holmes came across Bugler H. Norman Hawthorne, who was lying in the open with two broken legs. He proceeded to pick Hawthorne up and carried him on his back until he reached the stretcher bearers, two miles behind the trenches. He then ran back to the frontline. He returned to his battalion only to find "a scene of carnage", with much of the men "killed or wounded and a gun in danger of being captured by German forces". A wounded artilleryman asked Holmes if he could ride, as all the drivers were dead and someone had to guide the six horses to take the 18-pounder gun to safety. He limbered up the gun, placed the wounded artilleryman on one of the horses, and drove the artillery gun team away from the front line until they were out of range of the German artillery. Unfortunately, the injured man fell off somewhere in the dark and was lost. Eventually, on the second day of the battle, Holmes and his gun team reached the rearguard of a retiring artillery column. His story was first met with suspicion by the unit's major but was verified after a while and he became the battery's guest.

Following the events of the Battle of Le Cateau, on 30 August 1914, Holmes rejoined 'A' Company of his battalion. However, in October 1914, he was seriously wounded in the ankle during a counter-attack; this resulted in the army doctors at the dressing station wishing to amputate his leg but he refused. He was instead repatriated to a hospital in England and then on Aldershot to recuperate. During his convalescence, Holmes was awarded the French Médaille Militaire and received notice that he was to be awarded the Victoria Cross (VC), the United Kingdom's highest award for bravery in the face of the enemy. He was also mentioned by Sir John French in his despatch, dated 8 October 1914. On 13 January 1915, he attended Buckingham Palace where he received his VC from King George V.

=== Later service ===
In October 1915, having recovered from his leg injury, Holmes joined the 1st Battalion, Green Howards and was promoted to sergeant. In December 1915, he was posted to India with his regiment. On 14 March 1917, he was commissioned as a second lieutenant in the Green Howards, thereby becoming an officer. He was soon attached to 9th Battalion, Worcestershire Regiment. In July 1917, he was posted to Mesopotamia. There he suffered an accident during which he fractured his skull and was repatriated back to England in January 1918.

After recovering from his second major injury of the war, he was promoted to lieutenant on 14 September 1918. He was assigned to the Infantry Record Office in October 1918. On 4 April 1919, he was gazetted under special appointments Class HH. He also served in Ireland during the Irish War of Independence. He relinquished the special appointment on 1 April 1921, having ceased to be employed by a Record Office. He retired from the British Army on 20 August 1921 due to ill health.

In addition to his Victoria Cross and Médaille Militaire, he ended his war service with the 1914 Star with Mons clasp, the British War Medal, and the Victory Medal with Mentioned in Despatches oak leaf.

=== Later life ===
After leaving the army, he settled in London with his wife and at least one child. He and his wife would go on to have a total of seven children together. He attempted to set up his own business but this failed and he sold his medals in the 1920s. On 27 September 1939, he reached the age limit of liability for call up and so ceased to belong to the Regular Army Reserve of Officers. However, during the Second World War, he voluntarily once more became a British Army officer and served in a number of administrative appointments in the United Kingdom until ill health led to his discharge in June 1943. He then served with the Observer Corps until the end of the war. By 1954, he was living in Rickmansworth, Hertfordshire.

Having emigrated to Port Augusta, Australia in 1960, he broke one leg and then the other, leaving him disabled in the early 1960s. He died on 22 October 1969 in Port Augusta. He was cremated at the Stirling District Crematorium, Adelaide. His ashes are interred in the Stirling North Garden Cemetery, Port Augusta, alongside his wife who predeceased him by one year.

== Indian rope trick ==
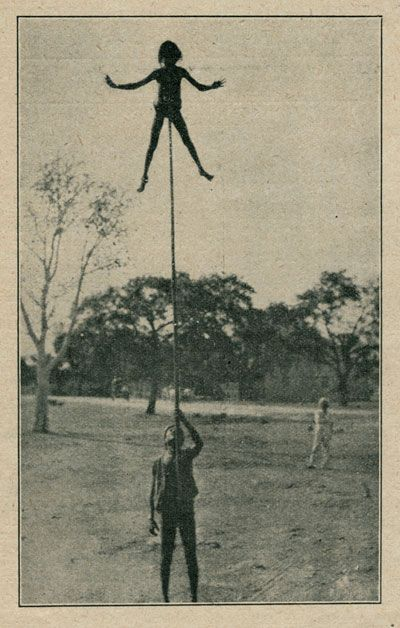
Holmes' photograph of the "Indian rope trick" in May 1917

In 1917, Holmes, who was a Lieutenant at the time, stated that whilst on his veranda with a group of officers in Kirkee, he had observed the Indian rope trick being performed by an old man and young boy. The boy climbed the rope, balanced himself and then descended. The old man tapped the rope and it collapsed. This demonstration did not include the disappearance of the boy. In February 1919, Holmes presented a photograph he had taken of the trick at a meeting with members of The Magic Circle. It was examined by Robert Elliot, who stated it was not a demonstration of the Indian rope trick but an example of a balancing trick on a bamboo pole. Elliot noted that "the tapering of the pole is an absolutely clear feature and definitely shows that it was not a rope." Holmes later admitted this, however, the photograph was reproduced by the press in several magazines and newspapers as proof the trick had been successfully demonstrated. Although discredited, the photograph is considered to be the first ever taken of the trick.

== Bibliography ==
- Buzzell, Nora, ed. (1997). The Register of the Victoria Cross. Cheltenham, Gloucestershire: This England Alma House. ISBN 0-906324-27-0.
- Harvey, David (2000). Monuments to Courage. Naval & Military Press Ltd. ISBN 1-84342-356-1.
