= Joseph Vanek =

Joseph Vanek (31 July 1818 – 11 December 1889) was a Hungarian magician and scientist. He became well known for an illusion that involved the decapitation of his son, the head was even passed to the audience.

Vanek was born in Budapest. He had worked as a professor of physics at Pester Seminar and as a professional magician. According to magic historian John Booth he had "majored in chemistry, physics, mathematics and philosophy in the university. He was recognized as a scientist, researcher and professor prior to adding natural magic to his demonstrations of scientific experiments." He also worked at the Printing Department of the Hungarian Treasury, under Louis Kossuth. He toured Asia and Europe with his magic illusions.

His decapitation illusion had taken two years to perfect. His son's head was allegedly severed with a scimitar, then placed on a tray and carried into the audience. The artificial head was very realistic and blood was even reported to have dripped to the floor. The secrets to the illusion were never revealed by Vanek.
