= Penn & Teller's Magic and Mystery Tour =

Television series

- Genre: Documentary
- Directed by: Ric Esther Bienstock; Mick Grogan; Hugo Smith
- Starring: Penn & Teller
- Country of origin: United Kingdom
- Original language: English
- No. of series: 1
- No. of episodes: 3

Production
- Production locations: China; Egypt; India
- Running time: 50 minutes

Original release
- Release: 10 September – 24 September 2003

Penn & Teller's Magic and Mystery Tour is a 2003 television documentary miniseries starring Penn & Teller. The program was created by the CBC in association with Channel 4 Film. Ric Esther Bienstock was series producer and writer. She also directed the China episode.

The show focuses on street magic, and the subjects of each of the three shows are China (Chinese Linking Rings), India (Indian Rope Trick), and Egypt (Cups and Balls, Gali-Gali men). Unusually for Penn and Teller, Teller speaks in the Egypt episode, even though part of their trademark performance is that Penn does all the speaking.

== China ==
This episode begins in Beijing, which, until the 1949 Revolution, had an extensive history of street magic. Modern day "street magic" is performed in teahouses. Besides the basic sleight of hand work (e.g. Cups and Balls), two tricks with historic ties are demonstrated.

The first trick involves a man who produces various glass bowls filled with water from beneath a large robe. These bowls are of all shapes and sizes, often also contain flowers, and several are quite elaborate; one produced set is a stack of seven bowls of diminishing size.

The second is a mask trick, known as Bian Lian, derived from Sichuan opera. The magician, in fractions of a second (the video is not fast enough to register the changes), alters the mask he wears. The performer has ten different masks, and also uses his normal face as a "mask" in the performance.

Their next stop is an acrobatics school in Wuqiao, where a "master" is teaching a class of late-year students various basic tricks.

After their trip to the acrobatics school, a place where many of these students will end up is displayed: an empty (and unheated, even in the dead of winter) "Acrobatics World". The performers, be they acrobatics performers or magicians, perform quite admirably, for no audience (save Penn, Teller, and their camera crew).

Finally, the duo proceed to Wanking, China, a small town in the hinterlands, where a great many residents perform some form of magic. When a family prepares to go to the town center to perform, Teller asks to perform a trick.

== India ==
In India, where street magic is very alive, a family of street magicians take center stage. The tricks performed are of an exceptionally bloody nature; in one trick, a tongue is cut out. To befriend the magicians, Penn and Teller give them a stage knife that oozes blood.

Several tricks demonstrated in this episode have injury of a family member as a theme. A magician performs the Basket Trick with his son. These forms of trick are seen as an inspiration for the alleged brutality of the Indian rope trick, where a small child, most likely the magician's son, is cut up and re-formed.

A magician does, in fact, perform the Indian rope trick in front of the Taj Mahal; a rope does come out of a basket vertically, and a small child sent to climb it does so. However, the child is not injured or bloodied in any way.

The brutal versions of the rope trick seem to have come from retelling. To show this, Penn and Teller set up a "performance" where a foreign couple enters the auditorium at the end of the trick, when the rope falls down and the child miraculously comes back to life. Rumors about the rope trick started spreading both within the local community and in England, when the couple returned home.

Penn and Teller do feel that one of the actions of a certain family of street magicians in India is unethical. At the end of the performances, the street magicians attempt to sell magic rings, which the magician represents as a source of good luck or power.

== Egypt ==
In an Egyptian tomb, it is alleged that a 4,000-year-old hieroglyph depicts the Cups and balls trick. Penn and Teller go to Beni Hassan to see the tomb inscriptions. They decide the scene painted is not necessarily a cups and balls performance, but it might be. However, they see paintings of juggler performances in the same tomb. Penn notes he started his career as a juggler, before becoming a magician; and "jugglers always seem to arrive before magicians."

The majority of this episode is in search of the Gali-Gali men, a group of magicians with an extensive history made popular in the West by Luxor Gali-Gali. They film several Gali-Gali shows and visit the relatives of Luxor Gali-Gali. Luxor Gali-Gali's original cups, seen on The Ed Sullivan Show in 1949, are still in use by his descendants in Cairo.

In this episode, Penn and Teller perform their particular version of the Cups and Balls in the tomb with the hieroglyphs using red and then clear plastic cups, concluding with the revelation of a potato.
