= Peter Lamont (historian) =

Peter Karl Lamont
- Education: University of Edinburgh

Peter Karl Lamont is a research fellow at the University of Edinburgh, working on the history, theory and performance of magic. He is a magician, Member of The Magic Circle, and a former president of the Edinburgh Magic Circle. He has performed and lectured across the world.

He is the author of The Rise of the Indian Rope Trick: The Biography of a Legend, which discusses the Indian rope trick, and The first psychic: the peculiar mystery of a Victorian wizard, which traces the life and times of the "first psychic" Daniel Dunglas Home, a Scottish medium, born in Edinburgh.

== List of works ==
=== Books ===
- Lamont, P. & Wiseman, R. (1999). Magic in Theory: An Introduction to the Theoretical and Psychological Elements of Conjuring (Hatfield: University of Hertfordshire Press)
- Lamont, P. (2004). The Rise of the Indian Rope Trick: Biography of a Legend (London: Little, Brown)
- Lamont, P. (2005). The First Psychic: The Peculiar Mystery of a Notorious Victorian Wizard (London: Little, Brown)
- Lamont, P. (2013). Extraordinary Beliefs: A Historical Approach to a Psychological Problem (Cambridge: Cambridge University Press)

=== Papers ===
- Lamont, P. (2004). Spiritualism and a Mid-Victorian Crisis of Evidence. Historical Journal 47 (4): 897–920.
- Lamont, P; Bates, C. (2007). Conjuring Images of India in Nineteenth-Century Britain. Social History 32 (3): 308–324.
