= Joseph Dunninger =

American mentalist and magician (1892–1975)

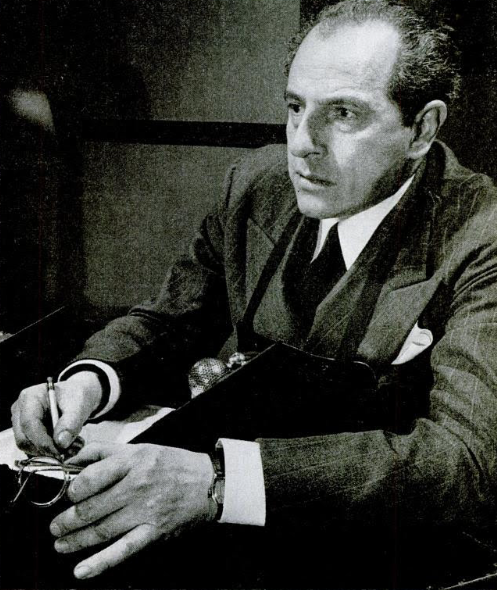
- Dunninger in 1944
- Born: April 28, 1892; New York City, New York
- Died: March 9, 1975 (aged 82); Cliffside Park, New Jersey
- Occupations: Magician, escapologist, mentalist.

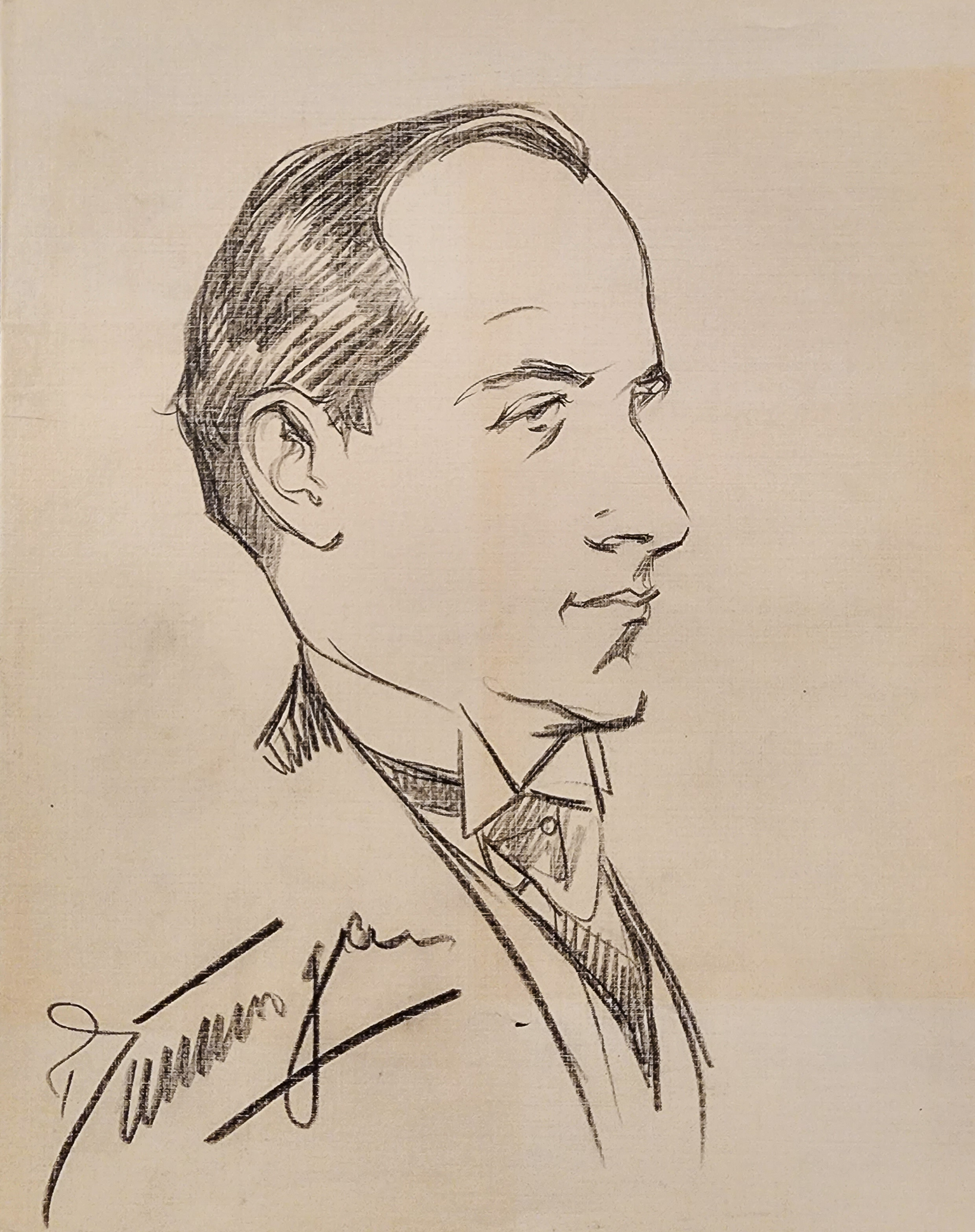
Signed drawing of Joseph Dunninger by Manuel Rosenberg 1926

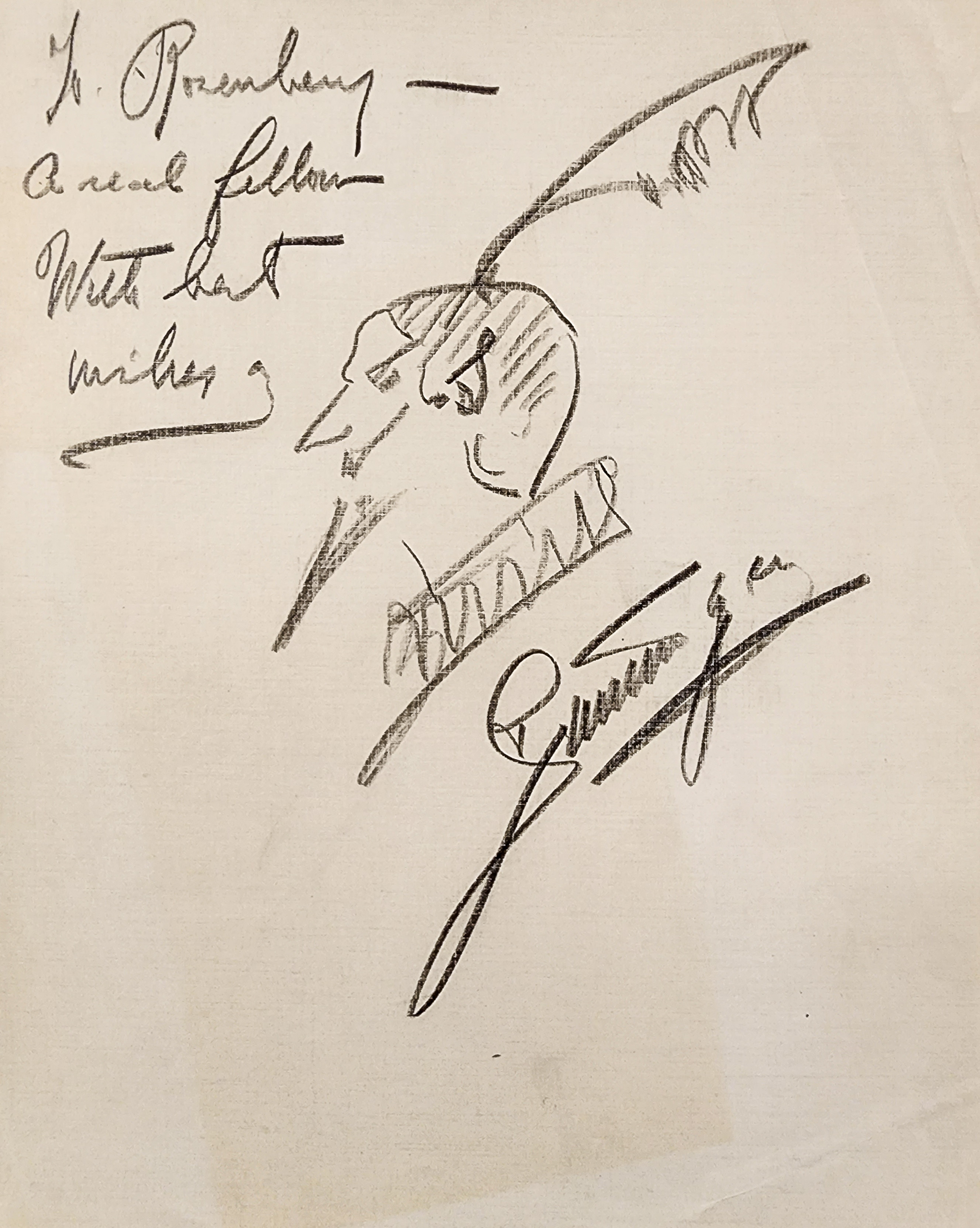
Signed caricature by Joseph Dunninger for Manuel Rosenberg for the Cincinnati Post 1926

Joseph Dunninger (April 28, 1892 – March 9, 1975), known as "The Amazing Dunninger", was one of the most famous and proficient mentalists of all time. He was one of the pioneer performers of magic on radio and television. A debunker of fraudulent mediums, Dunninger claimed to replicate through trickery all spiritualist phenomena.

== Biography ==
Dunninger was born in New York City. He headlined throughout the Keith-Orpheum Circuit, and was much in demand for private entertainment. At the age of seventeen he was invited to perform at the home of Theodore Roosevelt in Oyster Bay and at the home of the inventor Thomas Edison, both of whom were avid admirers of Dunninger. President Franklin D. Roosevelt invited Dunninger to the White House on a number of occasions to demonstrate his mentalist skills.

Dunninger was a debunker of fraudulent mediums. He claimed to replicate through trickery all spiritualist phenomena. He wrote the book Inside the Medium's Cabinet (1935) which exposed the tricks of mediumship. He also exposed how the indian rope trick could be performed by camera trickery. In 1935, Dunninger attended a séance of the fraudulent medium Emerson Gilbert. His testimony was used in court against the medium.

Dunninger had a standing offer of $10,000 to anyone who could prove that he used confederates or "stooges." Through Scientific American magazine and his own organization the Universal Council for Psychic Research he also made an offer to any medium who could produce by psychic or supernatural means any physical phenomena that he could not duplicate or explain by natural means. No medium ever won the reward. According to Dunninger "through all these long years, I have sought good honest ghosts, phantoms, spirits, astral beings, banshees, fays, wee folk, apparitions, fetches—the whole pack and passel of the unsubstantial world—and I have always been able to prove them frauds."

He was a good friend to many notables in the magic community including Harry Houdini, Francis Martinka and Tony Slydini. He maintained a lifelong friendship with author of The Shadow, Walter B. Gibson, who guest wrote or cowrote a number of books for Dunninger on magic, psychic phenomena and spiritualism. In 1937, Max Holden considered "Dunninger the foremost magician and showman of the present day". He acted as technical adviser as just "Dunninger" in the 1953 biopic film Houdini starring Tony Curtis in the title role.

Dunninger appeared on radio starting in the 1920s, and had his own weekly show on the Blue Network in 1943. Beginning on June 4, 1946, he had a show that replaced Amos 'n' Andy on NBC for four weeks. In 1948, Dunninger and Paul Winchell were featured on Floor Show on NBC TV. Recorded via kinescope and replayed on WNBQ-TV in Chicago, Illinois, the 8:30–9 pm Central Time show on Thursdays was the station's first mid-week program. He was featured on television frequently in the 1950s and 1960s. During the ‘50s and ‘60s his name was used as the basis for two recurring comedic characters, "The Amazing Dillinger" played by Johnny Carson on The Johnny Carson Show in 1955; and "Gunninger the Mentalist" on a television show hosted by the comedian Soupy Sales. On the I Love Lucy episode "Ricky's European Booking" (Season 5, episode 10) after Fred Mertz accurately predicts Lucy's excited reaction to Ricky's new booking, he gets a big laugh when he brags to Ricky "Just call me Dunninger." In the Columbo episode, "Now You See Him", a stage magician (Jack Cassidy) refers to one of his illusions with, "It's an old stand by. Dunninger used it in his act."

He died of Parkinson's disease at his home in Cliffside Park, New Jersey.

== Works ==
Dunninger self-published many of his works, and others were published by inventor Hugo Gernsback. He also wrote articles in Science and Invention, Mechanix Illustrated, Popular Mechanics, Fate, Atlantic Monthly, and other magazines. Many of these articles were ghostwritten by Walter B. Gibson.

Articles

- Popular Magic. Modern Mechanix (May, 1938)
- Spiritualism A Psychic Investigator Exposes Mediums Frauds. Life (June, 1941)

Books

- Dunninger's Tricks De Luxe (1918)
- Dunninger's Tricks Unique (1918)
- Dunninger's Master Methods of Hypnotism (1923)
- Popular Magic (1926)
- Universal Second Sight Mysteries (1927)
- Houdini's Spirit Exposes and Dunninger's Psychical Investigations (1928)
- Popular Magic Vol. II (1929)
- Popular Magic and Card Tricks (1929)
- Dunninger on Hypnotism (1930s)
- Inside the Medium's Cabinet (1935)
- How to Make a Ghost Walk (1936)
- Here's Fun for Young and Old: Dunninger’s Magic Tricks (1940)
- What's On Your Mind (1944)
- 100 Houdini Tricks You Can Do (1954)
- The Art of Thought Reading (1956)
- Magic and Mystery: The Incredible Psychic Investigations of Houdini and Dunninger (1967)
- Dunninger's Complete Encyclopedia of Magic (1967)
- Dunninger's Secrets as told to Walter Gibson (1974)
- Dunninger's Monument to Magic (1974)
- Dunninger's Book of Magic (1979)

== Gallery ==
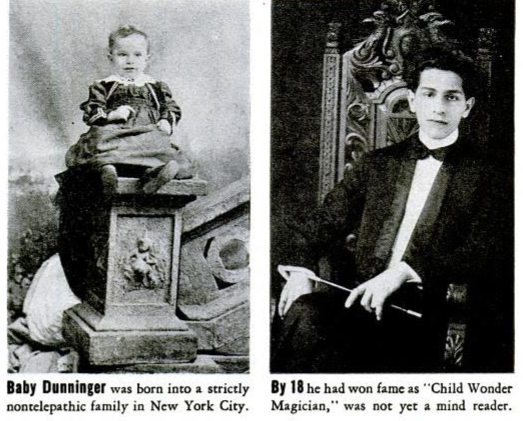
A young Dunninger

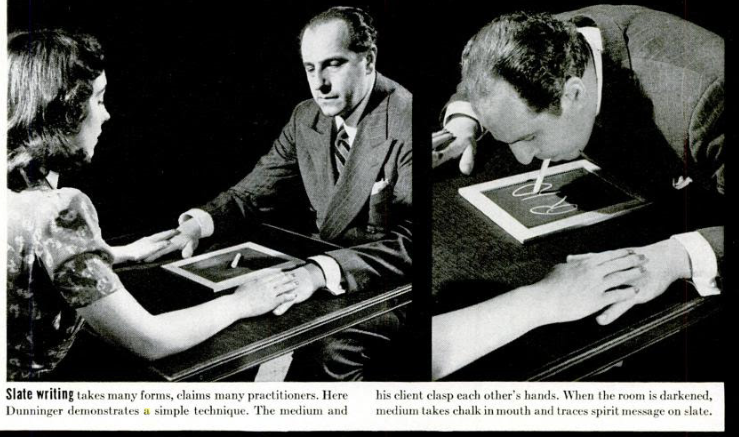
Dunninger exposing slate writing trickery

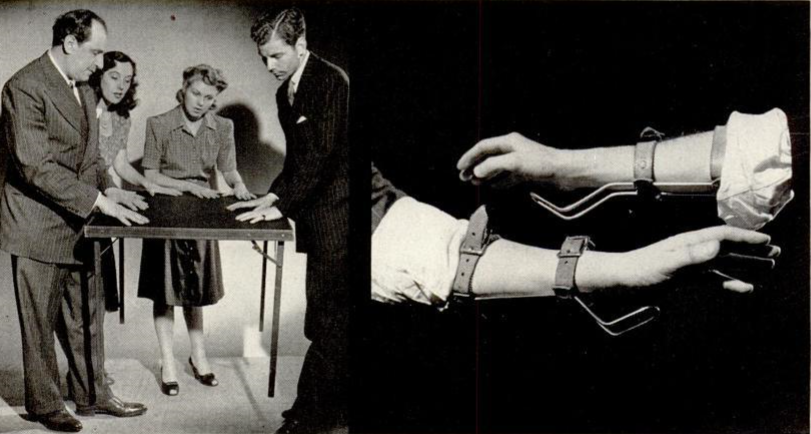
Dunninger demonstrating a table-tilting trick

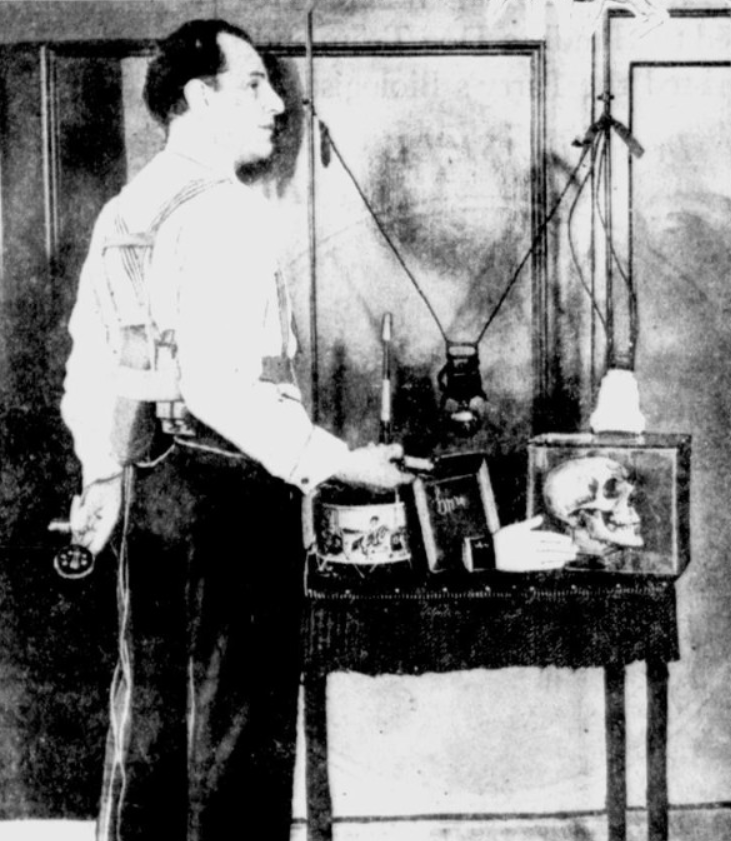
Dunninger with equipment used to duplicate the tricks of spiritualist mediums. A portable wireless set is strapped to his back

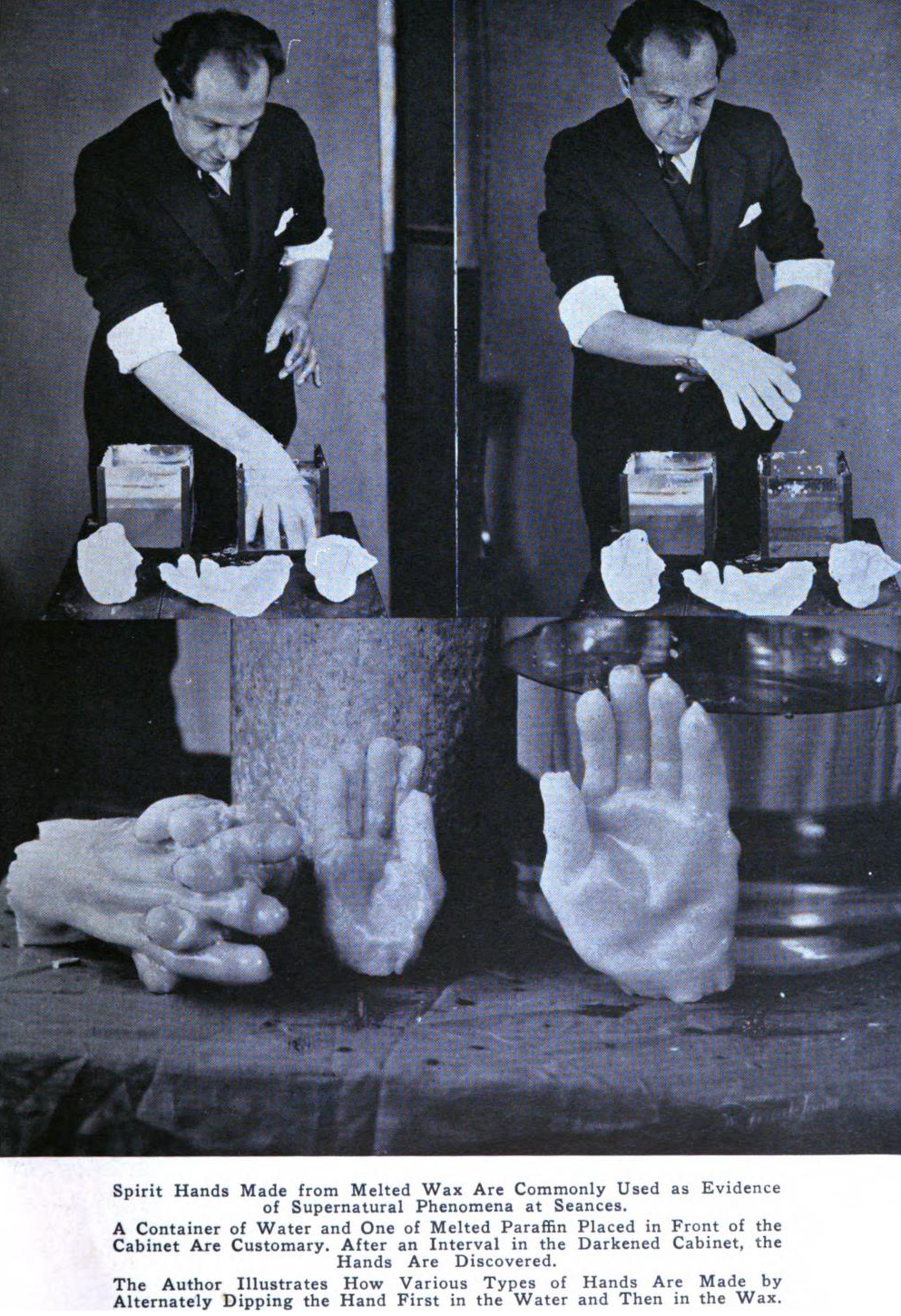
Dunninger making fake "spirit" hand molds

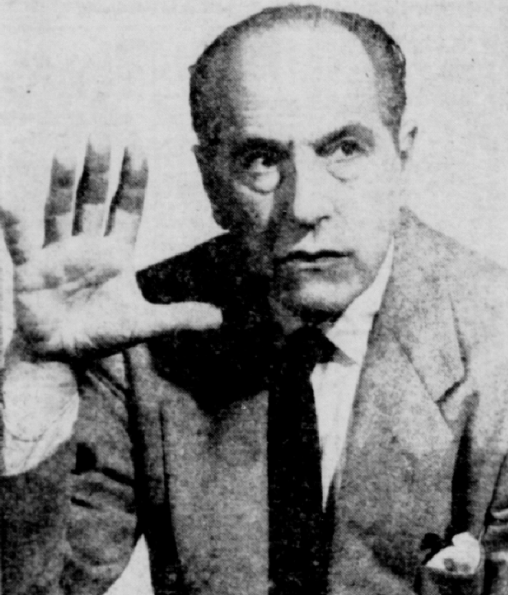
Dunninger in 1956
