= Hamlet (1912 film) =

1912 film by Charles Raymond

- Directed by: Will Barker; Charles Raymond
- Based on: Hamlet; 1599 play by William Shakespeare
- Produced by: William Barker
- Starring: Charles Raymond; Dorothy Fane; Constance Backner
- Cinematography: William Barker
- Edited by: William Barker
- Release date: 1912
- Running time: 20 minutes
- Country: United Kingdom

Hamlet is a 1912 British silent drama film directed by Charles Raymond and starring Raymond, Dorothy Foster and Constance Backner. It was an adaptation of the play Hamlet by William Shakespeare.

== Cast ==
- Charles Raymond - Hamlet
- Dorothy Foster - Ophelia
- Constance Backner - Gertrude

== See also ==
- List of ghost films
