= Charles Raymond (director) =

British film director (1858–1930)

Charles Raymond was a British actor and film director of the silent era.

== Selected filmography ==
Director

- Hamlet (1912)
- Robin Hood Outlawed (1912)
- Lieutenant Daring and the Labour Riots (1913)
- The Great London Mystery (1920)
