= Bian lian =

Chinese dramatic art

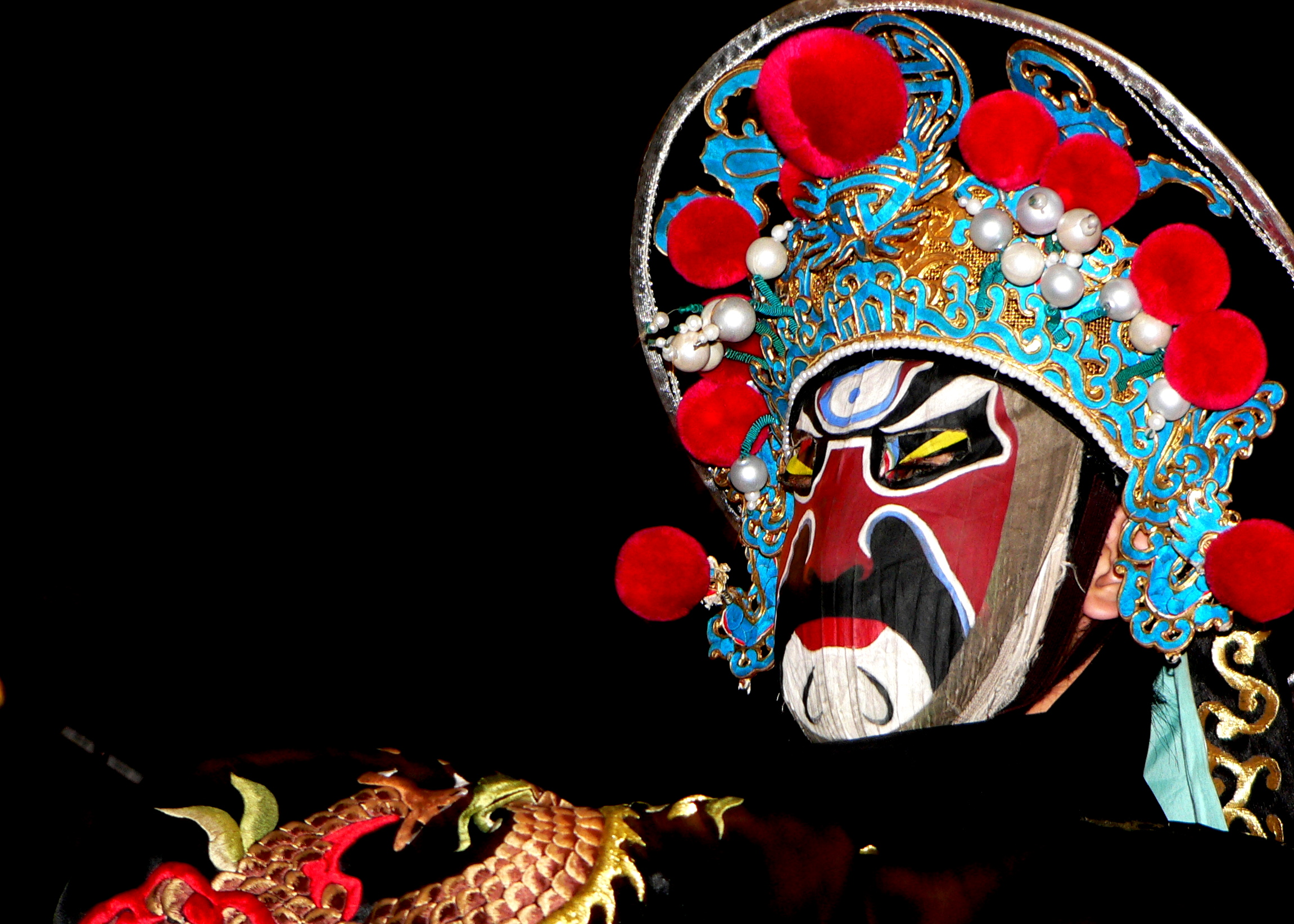
Bian lian performer

Bian lian (traditional Chinese: 變臉; simplified Chinese: 变脸; pinyin: biàn liǎn; lit. 'face-changing') is an ancient Chinese dramatic art that is part of the more general Sichuan opera. Performers wear brightly colored costumes and move to quick, dramatic music. They also wear vividly colored masks, typically depicting well known characters from the opera, which they change from one face to another almost instantaneously with the swipe of a fan, a movement of the head, or wave of the hand.

== History ==
Bian lian is an important part of Sichuan opera, popular in eastern and central Sichuan, Chongqing, Guizhou, and Yunnan Province. Traditionally, the technique was kept secret within the family. Only men were permitted to learn bian lian—the theory being that women did not stay within the family and would marry out, increasing the risk the secret would be passed to another family. Controversially, a Malaysian Chinese woman named Candy Chong became a popular performer after learning bian lian from her father. Another female performer is Du Li Min, who teaches a workshop in Kuala Lumpur with her husband Bian Jiang.

In a 2006 interview, Sichuan Opera performer Wang Daozheng said the secret of bian lian leaked out during the 1986 visit of a Sichuan opera troupe to Japan. Wang laments the leak of this Chinese traditional secret performance art and is concerned that non-Chinese performers in Japan, Singapore, South Korea and other countries are not well-trained. Wang argues that bian lian is one of the traditional arts protected by Chinese secrecy laws but officials of the Chinese Ministry of Culture have stated that this is not true.

In 2003, Hong Kong pop star Andy Lau allegedly offered to pay bian lian master Peng Denghuai 3,000,000 yuan (ca. US$360,000) in order to learn the techniques. Although Lau learned the techniques from Peng, both deny any money changed hands. Knowing the secret does not make it easy and thus far, Andy Lau has learned only how the masks are changed so quickly, but has not yet mastered the technique.

Historically, bian lian had rarely been seen outside of China because non-Chinese were not permitted to learn the art form, but since the mid-2000s it has been performed occasionally in international mass media and at Chinese themed events. Juliana Chen performed on The World's Greatest Magic television special with a brief black-light performance of bian lian. Michael Stroud (as The Magique Bazaar) performed bian lian on America's Got Talent. Bian lian was also featured on Penn & Teller's Magic and Mystery Tour.

Since the cultural basis of the opera are not well known outside of China, international performers have been making efforts to inform and increase the entertainment value for Westerners who do not know the context and meaning of the different faces.

== Four ways of face-changing ==
Blowing Dust (Chinese: 吹臉)
The actor blows black dust hidden in their palm or close to their eyes, nose or mouth, so that it obscures their face.
Beard Manipulation (Chinese: 髯口功夫)
Beard colours can be changed while the beard is being manipulated, from black to grey and finally to white, expressing anger or excitement.
Pulling-down Masks (Chinese: 扯臉)
The actor can pull down a mask which has previously been hidden on top of their head, changing their face to red, green, blue or black to express happiness, hate, anger or sadness, respectively.
Face-dragging (Chinese: 抹臉)
The actor drags greasepaint hidden in their sideburns or eyebrows across their face to change their appearance.

== See also ==
- Quick-change (similar Western performance)
- Sichuan opera
- Music of Sichuan
- The King of Masks, a 1996 Chinese film directed by Wu Tianming
