= The Great London Mystery =

1920 British silent crime film

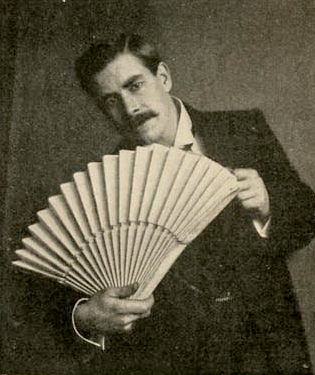
English magician David Devant

The Great London Mystery is a 1920 British silent crime film serial directed by Charles Raymond and starring David Devant, Robert Clifton and Charles Raymond. The serial, in 12 chapters, showcased the acting abilities of Devant, one of the most famous magicians of his time, allowing him to present his routine on film. After years of doing sleight of hand stage shows, Devant later turned to acting and film distribution. The film was written by Raymond and Hope Loring.

It is considered a lost film.

== Plot ==
An illusionist called The Master Magician tries to obstruct the evil plans of an Asian villain named Ching Ling Fu who has supernatural powers. Also in the film, an Englishman robs a sacred jewel from a temple and is haunted by its curse. The film couldn't have been too serious since one of the characters was named "Froggie the Vampire".

== Cast ==
- David Devant as The Master Magician
- Robert Clifton as Bob Sefton
- Charles Raymond as Ching Fu
- Lady Doris Stapleton as Audrey Malvern
- Kenneth Duffy as Edward Selwyn
- Martin Valmour as Webb
- Lester Gard as the man monkey
- Sadie Bennett as Curley
- Lola De Liane as Froggie the vampire
