= D. Devant, Conjurer =

- Directed by: Georges Méliès
- Starring: David Devant
- Production company: Star Film Company
- Release date: 1897
- Country: France
- Language: Silent

D. Devant, Conjurer (French: D. Devant (prestidigitation), also known as Devant's Hat Trick) is an 1897 French short silent film by Georges Méliès, starring the magician David Devant.

Devant, a major stage illusionist based in London, was an early proponent of moving pictures, introducing them into the magic performances he did with John Nevil Maskelyne at the Egyptian Hall and taking them along to private performances and on tour. He knew Méliès in London as well as in Paris, where Devant often went to get new films. It was Devant who, in 1896, sold Méliès a film projector made by the British pioneer Robert Paul. The year appearing for Méliès's camera, Devant had also been filmed by Paul, and Devant would later go on to try filmmaking on his own.

D. Devant, Conjurer was sold by Méliès's Star Film Company and is numbered 101 in its catalogues. In Britain, the Philipp Wolff Company also sold it, under the title Devant's Hat Trick. The complete film is currently presumed lost. However, a flipbook showing a magician pulling a rabbit out of a hat, published by Léon Beaulieu in the late 1890s, was rediscovered in the 2010s and has been tentatively identified as a fragment of the film. Two of Devant's films for Paul appear to survive in a very similar fragmentary format, as short sequences for flipbook-like devices.
