= Robert Elliot (surgeon) =

Robert Henry Elliot
- Born: 23 August 1864
- Died: 9 November 1936 (aged 72); Barnet
- Scientific career
- Fields: Ophthalmic surgery
- Workplaces: London School of Tropical Medicine

Professor Robert Henry Elliot FRCS (23 August 1864 – 9 November 1936) was a British ophthalmic surgeon and author, an expert on snake venom and on Indian magic.

== Biography ==
Born on 23 August 1864, Robert Elliot was educated at Bedford School and at the Medical College of St Bartholomew's Hospital. He entered the Indian Medical Service and was gazetted surgeon-lieutenant on 30 January 1892. He served on the North West Frontier, between 1892 and 1893, and was Superintendent of the Government Ophthalmic Hospital, Madras, and professor of Ophthalmology at Madras Medical College, between 1904 and 1914. He gained a D.Sc. from the University of Edinburgh in 1904 with a thesis on the pharmacology of cobra venom. He was Hunterian Professor at the Royal College of Surgeons, between 1916 and 1917, and Chairman of the Naval and Military Committee of the British Medical Association, between 1917 and 1922. In 1919 he was appointed as lecturer in Ophthalmology at the London School of Tropical Medicine, and as ophthalmic surgeon at the Prince of Wales Hospital.

Professor Elliot was a talented conjuror and was Chairman of the Occult Committee of The Magic Circle between 1919 and 1936. He declared that there is nothing in Indian medicine which is unknown in Europe and he considered that such phenomena as transfixion of the tongue and neck are anatomically possible. So far as firewalking is concerned, the essential factor is the extreme toughness of the feet of people who always walk barefoot. He allowed full credit to the Indian conjurers' extreme manipulative dexterity, but suggested that the Indian repertory is extremely limited. As for the Indian rope trick, he concluded that no such trick has ever been performed.

On snakes, Professor Elliot declared that the cobra is timid and inoffensive, will not strike unless alarmed by a sudden movement, has a limited range, and does not always strike effectively. An antidote for snake bites, he claimed, has been found, but each variety demands its own antidote and the process of making it is not yet available for emergencies.

Professor Robert Elliot died in Barnet on 9 November 1936.

== Publications ==
- Researches into the Nature and Action of Snake Venom, British Medical Journal, 1900, 1, 309 and 1146; 2, 217
- Sclero-Corneal Trephining in the Operative Treatment of Glaucoma, London, 1913; 2nd edition, 1914
- Glaucoma, a Handbook for the General Practitioner, London, 1917
- The Indian Operation of Couching for Cataract, London, 1918
- Glaucoma, a Textbook for the Student of Ophthalmology, London, 1918
- A Treatise on Glaucoma, London, 1918; 2nd edition, 1922
- Tropical Ophthalmology, London, 1920, translated into French, and into Spanish, 1922
- The Care of Eye Cases, London, 1921, translated into Chinese
- The Myth of the Mystic East, London, 1934
- Indian Conjuring Nature, 1936
