= Charles Bertram (magician) =

British magician

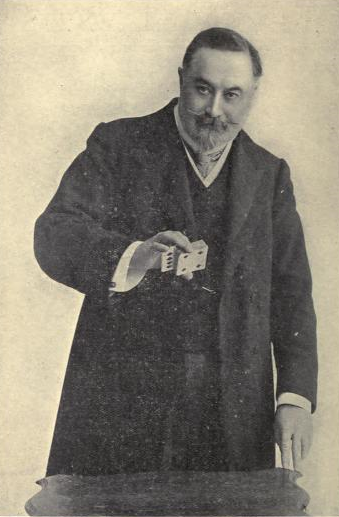
- Born: 26 April 1853
- Died: 28 February 1907 (aged 53)
- Occupation: Magician

Charles Bertram (26 April 1853 – 28 February 1907) was a British magician known as "The Royal Conjurer" as he performed for royalty.

== Career ==
Bertram was born James Bassett in Woolwich, it is suspected that he adopted the name of Charles Bertram (1723-1765). He was a favourite of King Edward VII who he performed for 22 times.

He also performed many times at Maskelyne and Cooke's entertainment shows at the Egyptian Hall.

Bertram travelled to Australia, Canada, China, India and many other countries. His experiences were recorded in his book A Magician in Many Lands.

Magician P. C. Sorcar has noted that Bertram "was a very accomplished English magician. He coined the famous magical catch-phrase, "Isn't it Wonderful?".

According to L. H. Branson, whilst growing up, Bertram had taught him conjuring tricks. Branson wrote that he went to his "house one afternoon a week, and I was duly initiated into the double-handed pass, single-handed pass, palming cards, billiard balls — in short, the gamut of which a conjurer should know."

Bertram wrote about the history of magic in his book Isn't it Wonderful? A History of Magic and Mystery (1896). The book was criticized by Harry Houdini who wrote it was "marred by mis-statements which even the humblest of magicians could refute."

He died of cancer at Streatham in 1907.

== Publications ==
- Isn't it Wonderful? A History of Magic and Mystery (1896)
- A Magician in Many Lands (1911)
