= Sichuan opera =

Type of Chinese opera

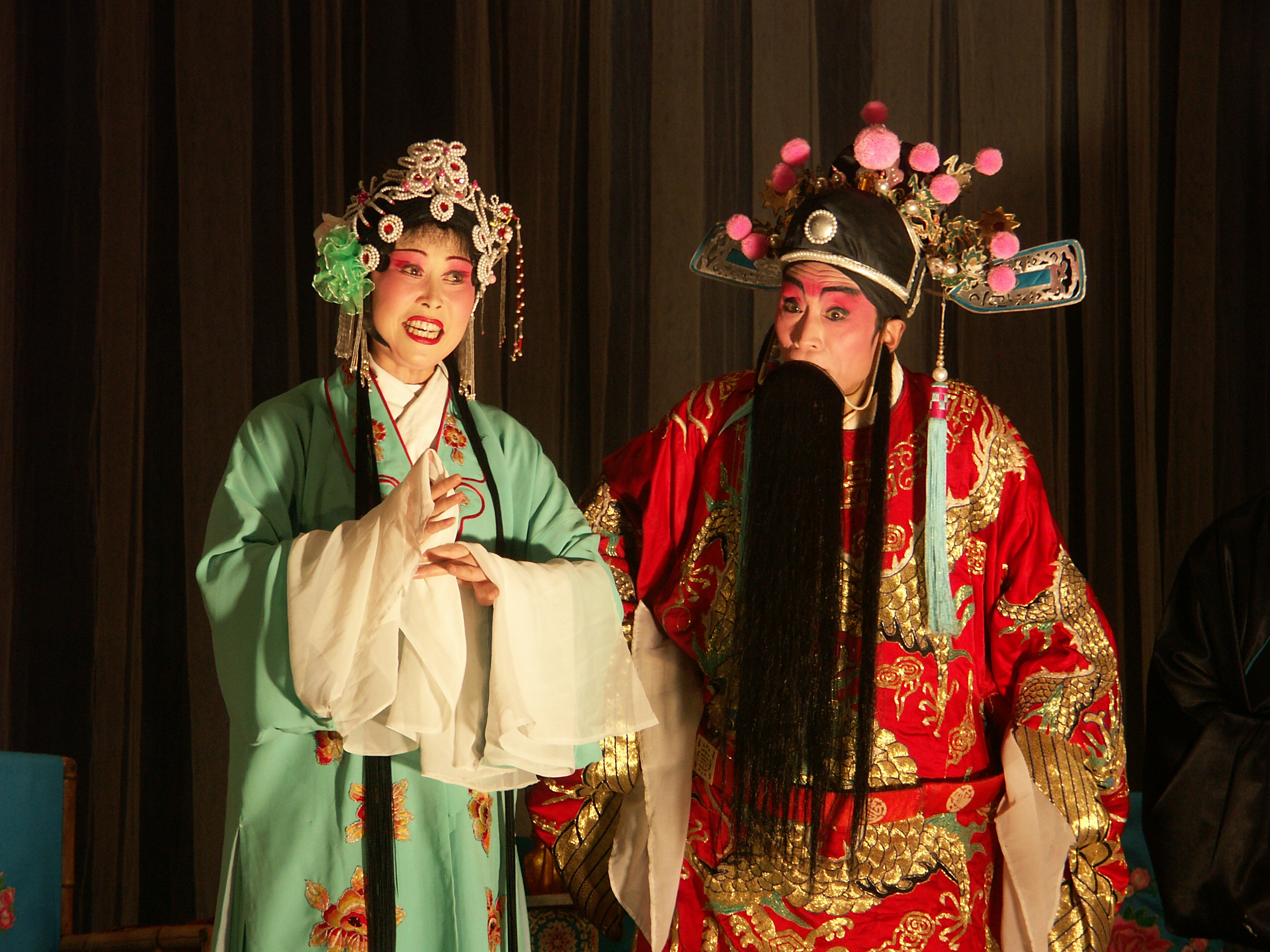
Sichuan opera in Chengdu

Sichuan opera (Chinese: 川劇; Sichuanese Pinyin: Cuan^{1}ju^{4}; pinyin: Chuānjù) is a type of Chinese opera originating in Sichuan province, China, around 1700. Today's Sichuan opera is a relatively recent synthesis of five historic melodic styles. Chengdu is the main home of Sichuan opera, while other influential locales include Chongqing, Guizhou, Yunnan, Hubei, and Taiwan. Sichuan opera was listed among the first batch of the Chinese Ministry of Culture's "Intangible Cultural Heritage List", announced on 20 May 2006.

Notable characteristics of Sichuan opera include quick changes of masks or personae (known as bian lian or face changing) and the importance of the character of the fool.

== History ==
Initially, there were five distinct opera styles. The history of each style varies greatly.

=== Before the Ming dynasty ===
The origins of Sichuan opera can be traced back to the pre-Qin period. The Jiaodian opera of the later Han dynasty laid the foundation for early Sichuan opera. A famous poem from the Warring States period, "Song Yu Asks the King of Chu", states: "they are Xialiba people, and there are thousands of people in the country who belong to harmony". The term "Xialiba people" here refers to Sichuan folk songs and dances, as well as singers and dancers. According to the records of the Taiping Guangji and Tares History Compilation, there was a play of bullfighting since Li Bing was the governor of Shu County in the 3rd century BC. During the Three Kingdoms period, the first satirical comedy appeared in Sichuan. This can be regarded as the originator of Sichuan opera comedy.

Between the Tang dynasty and the Five Dynasties, the popular drama of Sichuan reached its peak. This was sometimes referred to as an example of "Shu skills leading the world". Frequently performed plays in this period included Liu Bijimai, Maixiu Liangqi, and Guankou God. During this period, the earliest troupe in the history of Chinese opera, consisting of Qian Manchuan, Bai Jia, Ye Si, Zhang Mei, and Zhang Ao in Youyang Zazu, was formed.

In the Song and Yuan dynasties, Southern opera and Sichuan Zaju were popular in Sichuan. The most famous song from this period was "Jiu Se Cai Qi".

=== Ming and Qing dynasties ===
Jin Guanger's class of "Sichuan Opera" in the Ming dynasty once went to Jiangsu and caused a stir in Nanjing, which formed a competitive situation with the Southern opera.

At the end of the Ming dynasty and the beginning of the Qing dynasty, the population of Sichuan dropped sharply. Immigrants from various parts of China moved into Sichuan, which is known as Huguang filling Sichuan. Immigrants brought many different styles of opera from their hometowns. This resulted in styles of opera from both northern and southern dialects spreading throughout Sichuan successively. In its long-term development and evolution, based on the Sichuan Lantern opera, Sichuan opera integrated with other dialects, such as Gaoqiang opera, Kunqu opera, huqin, and Tanqiang opera. Sichuan opera also merged with the Sichuan dialect, folk customs, folk music, and dance. This gradually established a formal style of Sichuan opera, a voice art with Sichuan characteristics.

=== Republic of China ===
Following the Xuantong era, the 1911 Revolution led to the proclamation of the Republic of China (1912–1949) and the dissolution of the monarchy. Inspired by these revolutionary trends of thought, the lead singer Gaoqiang opera troupe banquet music, as well as Changle, Binle, Cui Hua, Taihong, and Shuyi—who mainly sang Kunqu opera, playing opera and huqin—voluntarily formed the "Sanqing Hui" after consultation, so that the five kinds of voice could be integrated into one. "Sanqing Hui" had notable actors such as Kang Zilin, Xiao Kaicheng, Tang Guangti, Tang Deyi, Zhou Mingchao, Liu Zhimei, and Lei Zhejiang. It also advocated for the reform of opera. While inheriting and preserving the traditional Sichuan opera, it created fashion shows that were more relevant to the contemporary era, such as The Story of Qiu Jin (Qiu Jin), The Recovery of Wuchang, and The Queen of the West. The establishment of "Sanqing Hui" promoted the development of Sichuan opera from square art to theater art, and the artistic level and cultural taste of Sichuan opera rapidly evolved, becoming the most influential local opera in Southwest China.

=== The People's Republic of China ===
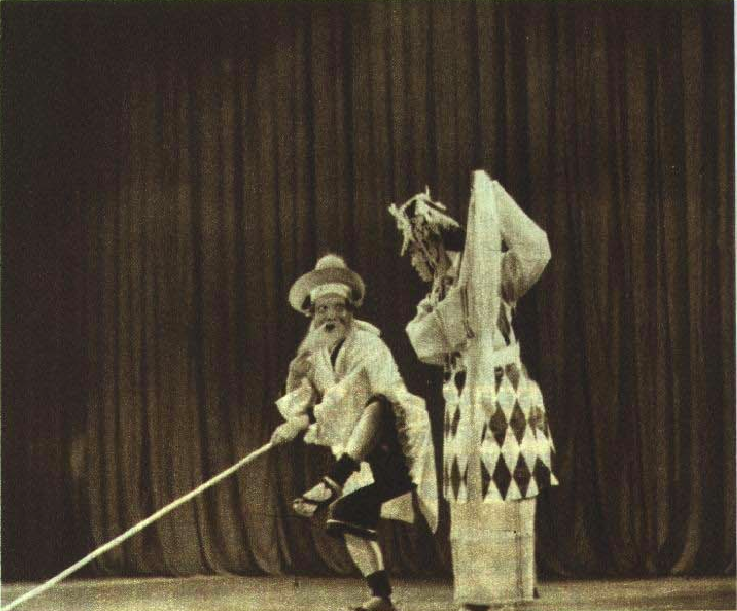
1952 Sichuan opera The Autumn River

In 1952, the Sichuan opera delegation organized a large performance group to attend the first National Opera Viewing and Performance Conference in Beijing. Several plays and performances, including The Willow Shadow, Autumn River, Snow Review, and Trace, Farewell, Brother Wutaihui, won awards.

Innovations were made in the aspect of voice cavity, especially in regards to the high voice cavity. Female voices would lead vocals, help vocals, choose a beautiful tone actress who was good at singing as a lead vocal, and help personnel. Along these lines, there were other experiments—such as female actors helping with female voices, male actors helping with male voices, and male and female voices helping with combined voices. Each troupe also set up a system of full-time female backing vocals personnel. At the same time, troupes also made innovations in singing and accompaniment.

In Zhou Enlai's "Speech at the Symposium on Literary Work and the Conference on the Creation of Feature Films" (19 June 1961), he said: "I saw the material in Sichuan. A vice minister of culture went to Sichuan and said: 'Sichuan opera is backward'. Offended the people of Sichuan. At that time, a comrade replied: 'Whether backward or not is up to the 70 million people in Sichuan to answer and decide.' I think this comrade is very brave. Good answer! People like it. You don't like it. Who are you? Shanghai people love Pingtan, Huai Opera and Yue opera. What do you want Beijing people to approve? Leaders may have preferences. Some love operas, some love paintings, and some love antiques. What does it matter? We saw the play say good, not necessarily good, our words are unreliable, everyone has their hobbies, how can as a standard? Art is to be approved by the people. As long as people like it, it has value."

During the "Cultural Revolution", more than 100 Sichuan opera troupes were disbanded, and a large number of famous actors, directors, writers, and artists were treated as "devils, ghosts, snakes, and gods", expelled, or transferred to "reform-through-labor teams". Some were even persecuted to death. After the "Cultural Revolution", Sichuan opera was quickly revived. The Cultural Bureau of Sichuan Province announced the opening of traditional operas in batches while holding literary and artistic arrangements to promote creation and performance. Sichuan Opera School was restored, Sichuan Opera Art Research Institute was established, and Sichuan Opera Theater and other units were rebuilt. Emei Film Studio produced a TV series called Sichuan Plum Blossoms, which was shown throughout the province and all of China. In 1979, on the occasion of the 30th anniversary of National Day, Sichuan operas such as Lying Tiger Order and Repair or Not Repair were performed in Beijing and won awards. In 1980, the Art of Sichuan Opera, a quarterly opera magazine, was published.

== Schools of thought ==
During the long-term development of Sichuan opera, there were differences between regions in what voice styles were popular, as well as in the relationships between artists and their teachers. Due to this, several schools of Sichuan opera were formed. These include: the Huanxian (Huaxian) school, Chouxing Fu (Sangan) school, Cao (Junchen, Wusheng) school, and the Wuzhou (Wuchou) school. These are sometimes praised as the "King Cao" schools, due to the perceived superior quality of its artists. At the same time, there are four schools, namely the Western Sichuan school, Ziyang River school, Northern Sichuan school, and Eastern Sichuan school, which are called the "four rivers" in the circle of Sichuan opera.

=== The four river schools ===
Like in several other folk arts, there is no standard tone in Sichuan opera. Additionally, each of the "four rivers" has its own cultural center. The four river schools of Sichuan opera can be divided into the western Sichuan Ba School, the Ziyang River school, the North Sichuan River school, and the Xiachuandong school.

==== Sichuan Ba School ====
The western Sichuan Ba School is centered in Chengdu and Wenjiang County, and includes the Bazi counties in western Sichuan. The actors use the Chinese Chengdu dialect without the Meihua sound. It is dominated by Gaoqiang opera and lantern opera, which has resulted in a unique "Ba tune".

==== Ziyang River school ====
The Ziyang River school is centered in Zigong City, and includes both Zigong and Neijiang county. The standard tone is the Zi Chinese dialect. It is dominated by Gaoqiang opera, and is considered to have the most careful artistic style.

==== North Sichuan River school ====
The North Sichuan River school is centered in Nanchong County and Santai County. The school includes parts of Nanchong, Mianyang, and Guangyuan. It has no standard tone. However, based on the differentiation of n/l and f/h in the Nanchong dialect, it appears to be influenced more by the Qinqiang dialect, with multi-lining characters and heavy nasal tones. The school mainly focuses on singing and playing opera, and has primarily been influenced by Qin opera.

==== Xiachuandong school ====
The Xiachuandong school, or the Eastern Sichuan school, is centered in Chongqing and includes the eastern Sichuan area. It is greatly influenced by Han opera and Peking opera. The language used is diverse, but is usually mixed with Wuhan dialect and Peking opera based on Chongqing dialect. Huqin is also characteristic of this school.

== Characteristics ==
Sichuan opera is notable for its quick changes of masks and personae, referred to as bian lian or face changing.

=== Makeup ===
Clown facial makeup is painted on the bridge of the nose in a white square. Makeup used can vary among both positive and negative characters. Yu Zhuang in harmony; Pure Angle, also known as "flower face", is a colorful facial makeup that indicates a clear loyalty and treachery. Black represents fortitude and integrity, white represents treachery and cruelty, red represents loyalty and courage, green represents chivalry and righteousness, blue represents firmness and determination, yellow represents cruelty and tyranny, and a gold and silver face represents holiness and majesty.

=== Costumes ===
There are many kinds of costumes in Sichuan opera, depicting characters such as: the "anaconda", "dependent child", "official clothing", and "pleated child". Depending on the style, face paint is also limited compared to other related forms. Jing characters do not appear, and the only painted face characters are those with a small white patch in the middle of the face, which indicates a slightly evil character. The face paint colors are traditionally limited to black, red, white, and grey.

=== Music ===
The music of Sichuan opera is unique. Its percussion is designed to be particularly exciting; Sichuan opera gongs and drums are revered for their powerful sound, clear and changeable rhythms, and unique timbre. Wind and percussion instruments are central to the genre, featuring many suona tunes and gong and drum sets. Sichuan opera "silk and bamboo" music (strings and woodwinds) often utilizes huqin and flute tunes. In terms of usage, the Kunqiang style employs Qudi (flute) and huqin melodies. The "minus" accompaniment style is used for lantern shows. The musical styles are diverse and feature a variety of artistic characteristics.

Gaoqiang is the most distinctive and representative form of Sichuan opera. Its main characteristics are a free melodic line and singing style. It is performed without musical accompaniment, using only a clapper and drum to regulate the rhythm. The percussion section utilizes large gongs and drums, which punctuate the qupai (melodic tunes) to closely integrate the backing vocals, acting, and singing. The vocal performance alternates between recitative and aria, allowing the accompaniment and vocals to enhance one another. Additionally, the percussion can vary the stage atmosphere infinitely. The most distinctive feature of Gaoqiang music is its tone.

Historically, Sichuan opera was assisted mainly by drum masters and other musicians. In recent decades, female choruses have been introduced to improve the vocal sound. This chorus helps set the tone, describe the environment, create stage atmosphere, and convey the characters' inner feelings or third-party commentary. The language of Sichuan opera is lively, humorous, and full of vivid local flavor. In mass performances, the drama is often based on daily life, with humorous dialogue that frequently draws cheers and laughter from the audience.

Gongs and drums play a vital role in Sichuan opera music, accompanying vocals and expressing characters' thoughts and emotions. The "five squares"—consisting of small drums, canggu, large gongs, large cymbals, and small gongs—are commonly used. When combined with strings and suona, the ensemble is known as the "six squares", conducted by the small drum. Percussion runs throughout the singing, acting, and recitation, organically combining these elements into the unique style of Sichuan opera. There are approximately 300 gong and drum pieces. Percussion is also used for sound effects, vividly mimicking rowing, gurgling water, rushing oceans, wind, rain, and the thud of heavy objects.

=== Other aspects of performance ===
Overall, the art form is known for its singing, which is less constrained than that of the more popular Peking opera. Sichuan opera is more akin to a play than other forms of Chinese opera, and the acting is highly polished. The accompaniment utilizes a small gong and a huqin (a bowed instrument similar to the erhu).

The traditional formula is systematic and may include a combination of stunts, such as bian lian (face changing), tihuiyan, sword-hiding, fire-spitting, and beard-changing, adapted to the plot and characters.

=== Character of the fool ===
The character of the fool, or uncouth bumpkin, is significantly more prominent in Sichuan opera than in other Chinese opera forms. Fool characters appear in various guises, including the mangpao (emperor's attendant), the fool in mandarin's robes, the playboy fool, the dirty and disheveled fool, the old-fashioned fool, and the thief fool. The thief fool is one of the most popular character archetypes in Sichuan opera.

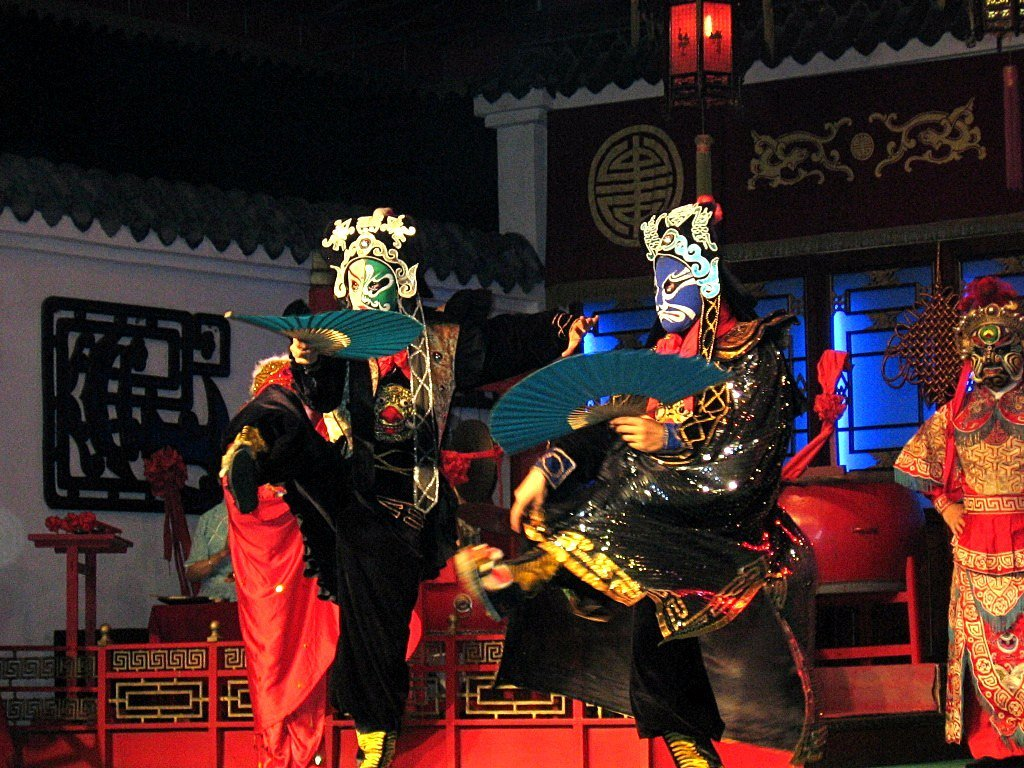
Sichuan opera performance in a Chengdu teahouse: Bian Lian

== Five styles ==
=== Gaoqiang ===
Gaoqiang is the most distinctive and representative form of Sichuan opera. Characterized by a free melodic line, it is performed without orchestral accompaniment, using only a clapper and drum to control the rhythm. Percussion music using big gongs and drums punctuates the qupai to integrate backing vocals, acting, and singing. The performance alternates between recitative and aria, with accompaniment and singing enhancing each other. Gaoqiang developed from the Yiyang tune of Jiangxi. In the second year of the Yongzheng Emperor (1724), Chengdu established the Gaoqiang opera troupe "Old Qinghua Troupe". During the reign of the Qianlong Emperor in the Qing dynasty, Gaoqiang—then called "Qing opera"—was introduced to Sichuan. As a form of folk singing without strings, it uses a colloquial style, possesses a large number of qupai, and is complemented by percussion. It combines with the Sichuan dialect, local Yangko rap, and other folk arts. In the first year of the Republic of China, the Gaoqiang opera troupe, banquet, music troupe, and other groups formed the "Sanqinghui". Gaoqiang gradually became the primary vocal style of Sichuan opera.

=== Kunqiang ===
Kunqiang, or Chuan Kun, refers to the Kunqu element of Sichuan opera, which evolved from the Kunqu opera of Jiangsu Province (Sukun). Sukun entered Sichuan in the late Ming dynasty and became popular with immigrants during the Qing dynasty. Retaining its original tunes, it adapted to the Sichuan dialect. Combined with Gaoqiang, huqin, Tanxi, and Sichuan opera percussion, it evolved into "Sichuan Kun". In 1912, the Kunqu opera troupe Shuyi Ban joined the Sanqing Association, establishing Kunqiang as one of the five Sichuan opera tones.

=== Huqin voice ===
The huqin voice, also known as Sixianzi, is named for its primary instrument, the "xiao huqin". Developed from Hui and Han tunes and absorbing elements of Shaanxi Hanzhong Erhuang, it is sung in the Sichuan dialect. It became popular in Sichuan during the Qianlong reign and was adapted into the "Sichuan-style" by incorporating local dialect and percussion. In the first year of the Republic of China, the Huqin opera troupe joined the "Sanqing Association".

=== Tanxi ===
Also known as "Chuan Bangzi" or "Gai Banzi", Tanxi is a variation of Qinqiang in Sichuan. Introduced to Sichuan in the late Ming or early Qing dynasties, Shaanxi opera was adapted to Sichuan audiences and combined with huqin, Gaoqiang, and percussion. Tanxi includes two primary emotional tunes: "Tian Ping" (joy) and "Kuping" (sadness). The meters include yizi, erliu, sanban, duoban, and daoban.

=== Dengdiao ===
Also known as Dengxi or Lantern theatre, Dengdiao is derived from folk Lantern Festival customs, songs, and dances. The music accompanies folk ditties, often utilizing the "pangtongtong" sound. Dengdiao music is generally short, with a distinctive rhythm and bright melody, intended to be relaxed and lively with witty comedy. The main accompanying instrument is the datongtong huqin, which has a thick, short rod and a large tube. Later, string instruments such as the Sichuan erhu were added.

== Repertoire ==
The repertoire of Sichuan opera is rich and varied. A saying states there are "three thousand in the Tang dynasty, eight hundred in the Song dynasty, and countless in the kingdom". There are more than 100 active repertoires on stage, including relics from the Song and Yuan Southern operas, Yuan Zaju, and Ming legends. Notable contributors include Bashu literati such as Zhao Xi, Huang Ji'an, Yin Zhongxi, Liu Huaixu, Ran Qiaozi, Zhao Xunbo, Xu Wenyao, Wu Boqi, Li Mingzhang, Wei Minglun, and Xu Fen.

After 1949, 321 repertoires were identified, and 116 were compiled and published. Works such as The Story of the Willow Shade, The Story of the Stone, Yu Zan Ji, La Lang Pei, Mandarin Ducks, The Royal River Bridge, The Adventure of Master Qiao, The Story of Burning Incense, The Legend of Fu Nu, and Jinshan Temple have been well received. Modern dramas and historical stories include Marriage, Husband and Wife Bridge, Wangniangtan, and Ding Youjun by Li Mingzhang, as well as Red Rhododendron, Yibin Baimao, Xu Yunfeng, Jiang Jie, Jiang Lang Da Xin, Yi Bold, and Four Girls.

=== Gaoqiang ===
The legacy of the Gaoqiang style is the most extensive, and its artistic features are the most prominent. Key works include the "Five Robes", "Four Pillars", and Jiang Hu Shi Ba Ben.

- The stories of the "Five Robes" are: The Story of the Green Robe (also known as Wufutang, which describes the events of Liang Hao becoming a champion at age 82), The Story of the Yellow Robe (also known as The Volume of Buddha, which describes the events of Sakyamuni becoming a Buddha), The Story of the White Robe (about Xue Rengui), The Story of the Red Robe (The Story of the White Rabbit), and The Story of the Green Robe (The Face of the Green Robe or Kao Chuntao).
- The stories of the "Four Pillars" are: Tiantian Pillar (about Gonggong's anger against the mountain), Crystal Pillar (about the story of Avalokitesvara and Wei Tuo subduing unruly dragons), Nine Dragon Pillar (about the Grand Master's ascension to heaven), and Pillars of the Five Elements (about the Monkey King making trouble in the Heavenly Palace).
- The Jiang Hu Shi Ba Ben ("Eighteen Books of Rivers and Lakes") include: Yougui Ji, Cailou Ji, Wooden Jingchai, Jade Hairpin, Bai Luopa, Baihua Pavilion, Sunflower Well, and Luanchai Ji. Other titles include Release the White Snake, White Parrot, The Story of Three Filial Pieties, The Story of Huaiyin, Zhong Sanyuan, Ju Gucheng, Iron Crown Picture, The Three Festivals, Han Zhenlie, Five Nobility Lianfang, and Languan Walking in Snow.
- Additionally, the four major books of the Gaoqiang style are: Golden Seal, The Story of the Pipa, The Story of the Red Plum, and Ban Chao (or Tou Notes).

=== Tanxi ===
The repertoire of Tanxi is represented by the four major volumes of Chun Qiu Pei, Mei Jiang Xian, Hua Tian Cuo, and Kujiezhuan.

=== Huqin ===
Huqin repertoires mostly perform stories from the Three Kingdoms and other periods. The Huangben, written by Huang Ji'an in the late Qing dynasty, are the most famous and include stories such as: Qing Ling Tai, San Fa Song, Shen Nong Jian, Shen Ji Ping, Chai Shi Jie, San Jin Zhong, Mian Zhu Guan, and Jiang You Guan.

=== Kunqu ===
There are few repertoires of Kunqu opera. The most popular stories include: Yi Jian Xian Jian, Dong Chuang Xiu Ben, Zui Zao, Zui Da, Zhui Ma, He Fan, and Dao Hui.

=== Lantern opera ===
The repertoire of Lantern opera includes Ping Zhang Nian, Bai Xin Nian, Da Mian Gang, Wu Zi Gao Mu, and Cai Yi. Literary works include Zhao Xi's Qing Tan, Ran Qiaozi's Dao Wu Bi, and Yin Zhongxi's Li Yan Ai.

== Roles ==
The roles in Sichuan opera are known as "trades" or role types. They are divided into six categories: sheng, dan, jing, mo, chou, and za.

Since the Qing dynasty, numerous Sichuan opera performing artists have emerged. These include Wei Changsheng in the Qianlong period; Xiao Xiating and Yue Chun in the Xianfeng and Tongzhi eras; Fu Sangan and Huang Jinfeng in the Guangxu and Xuantong eras; and Yang Sultan and Yang Sulan in the late Qing dynasty and early Republic of China.

During the Republic of China, notable figures included Kang Zilin, Tang Guangti, Huanhuaxian, Xiao Kaicheng, Tian Lai, Cao Junchen, and Yan Bingzhang.

Later generations include:

- The older generation: Jia Peizhi, Zhang Decheng, Zhou Haibin, Zhou Mulan, and Wu Xiaolei.
- The middle-aged generation: Liu Chengji, Zhou Yuxiang, Zhou Qihe, Chen Quanbo, Yang Youhe, Xue Yanqiu, Jiang Shangfeng, Yuan Yukun, and Zeng Ronghua.
- The young generation: Chen Shufang, Jing Hua, Yang Shuying, Xu Qianyun, Situ Huicong, Li Xiaofei, and Xie Ping'an.
- Rising stars: Zhao Youyu, Lan Guanglin, Zhang Qiaofeng, and Liu Shiyu.
