= L. H. Branson =

British magician (1879–1946)

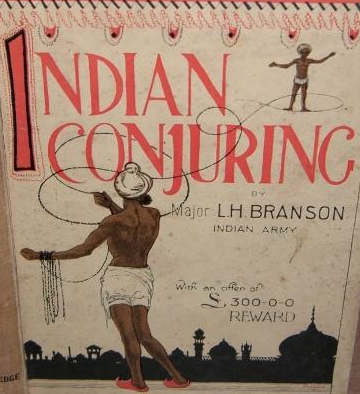
Branson's major work Indian Conjuring (1922).

Major Lionel Hugh Branson (8 April 1879 – April 1946) was a British magician and officer of the British Indian Army.

== Biography ==
Educated at Bedford School, between 1890 and 1895, Lionel Branson was commissioned a second lieutenant from the Royal Military College, Sandhurst, into the Royal Munster Fusiliers on 11 February 1899 and was promoted lieutenant 15 September 1900. He transferred from the 2nd battalion the Royal Munster Fusiliers to the British Indian Army on 17 February 1901, joining the 9th Bombay Infantry.

He served with the 9th Bombay Infantry during the Waziristan operations of 1901-02 on the North West Frontier and was mentioned in despatches (London Gazette 8 August 1902). He transferred to the 10th Bombay Infantry (later 110th Mahratta Light Infantry) on 30 May 1902.

Branson was promoted to captain on 11 February 1908 and appointed a company commander on 1 October 1910. He landed in Mesopotamia with his regiment in 1914 and was wounded in action on 3 December 1914.

He was appointed Assistant Censor (graded as a General Staff Officer, 3rd grade) from 20 December 1914 to 31 March 1915 and Assistant Censor (graded as a General Staff Officer, 2nd grade) from 1 April 1915 to 31 March 1917. He was then given a Special Appointment (graded as a General Staff Officer, 2nd grade) from 1 April 1917 to 23 October 1917. In late 1914 he founded and was the editor of The Basrah Times, a newspaper.

Branson was promoted to temporary major in July 1916 and confirmed in the rank of major in April 1917, with seniority from 1 September 1915. He was mentioned in despatches in the London Gazette 5 April 1916, 10 May 1916 and 12 March 1918. He retired from the Indian Army on account of ill-health 22 June 1923.

Branson incorporated his skills as a magician into his military service. His stage magician name was Lionel Cardac. He was a member of The Magic Circle, and devoted an entire chapter to debunking the Indian rope trick in his book Indian Conjuring (1922). He offered a large sum of money to anyone who could perform the Indian rope trick; no one ever claimed the reward.

Branson was also a debunker of spiritualism. He wrote that mediumship was the result of conjurer tricks and fraudulent phenomena.

He authored several books on magic under the pen name Elbiquet and wrote an autobiographical work, A Lifetime of Deception: Reminiscences of a Magician (1953).

== Publications ==
- A Text Book of Magic as Elbiquet (1913)
- Supplementary Magic as Elbiquet (1917)
- Indian Conjuring (1922)
- A Lifetime of Deception: Reminiscences of a Magician (1953)
