= Theatrograph =

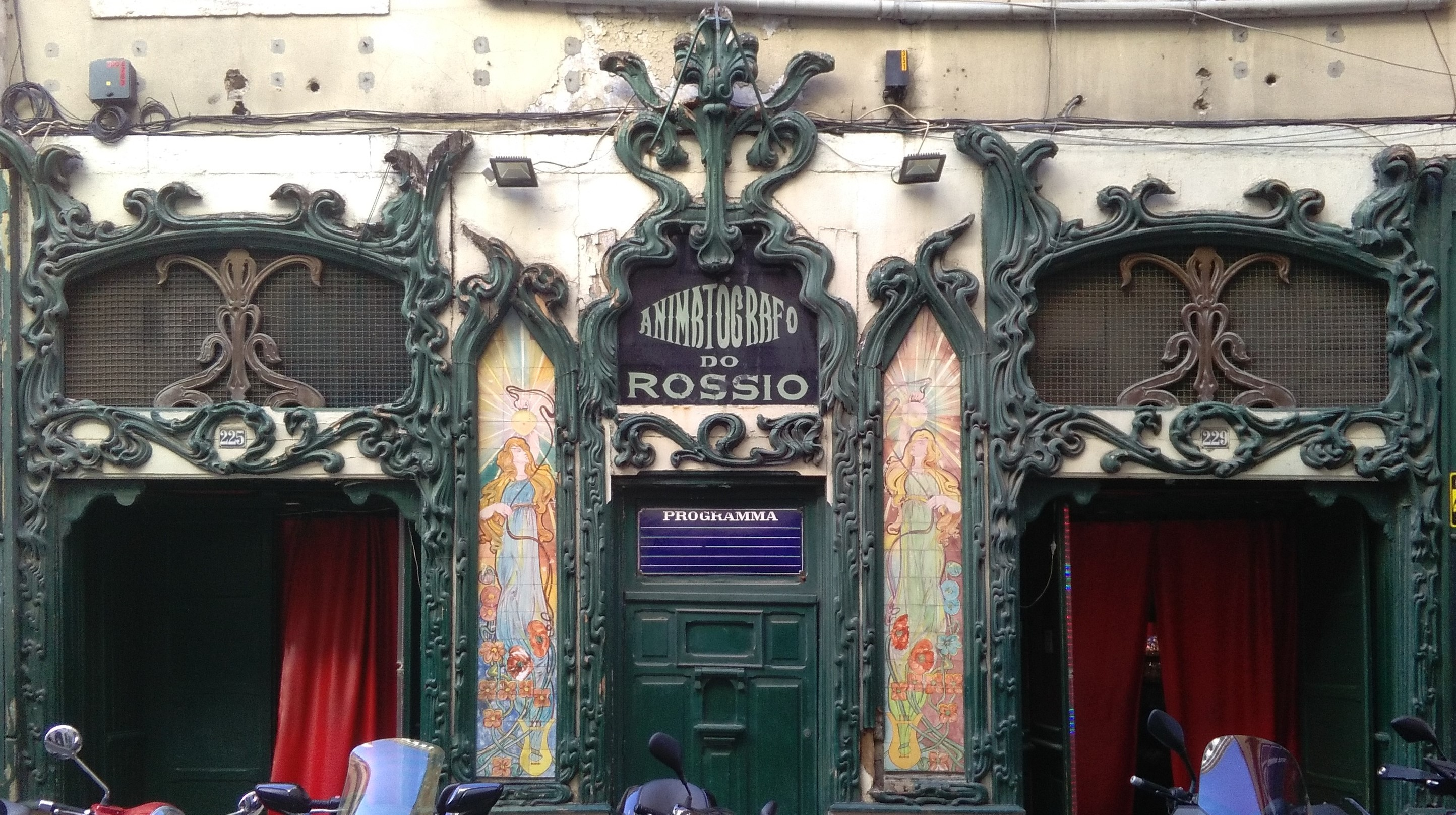
Animatograph in Rossio, Lisbon

We use the term Theatrograph to describe real-time hybrid performance that put together film and theatre. At the time it was advertised "as an ingenious apparatus for projecting moving figures upon a lantern screen". The Theatrograph is the first commercially produced 35mm film projector in Britain. It was first demonstrated by R.W. Paul at Finsbury Technical College on February 20, 1896. Many people wondered why it took Paul so long to produce the projector when he invented the camera used for filming in 1895, but he was also in the business of kinetoscopes. With kinetoscopes and camera filming he did not think he needed to go into something else. On March 21, Paul and Augustus Harris started hosting daily screenings, with tickets priced at sixpence.They agreed to split the profit fifty fifty. The use of Paul's Theatrograph in music halls up and down the country popularized early cinema in Britain. It was first revealed to the public at the Egyptian Hall in Piccadilly, London. Paul's first machine was not perfect, but it was the prototype of the modern projector and was the first projector designed solely for the projection of the 35 mm film to appear on the open market. The first Theatrograph was not patented by Paul, and print descriptions and photographs are all that remain to show what it looked like and how it worked. Paul recalled some of the theatrographs defects, on February 3, 1936 in the British Kinematograph Society which was a society used to help the growing film industry.

Carl Hertz sailed from England on 28 March 1896 aboard the Royal Mail Ship RMS Norman and during the voyage exhibited Paul's Theatrograph to the passengers. He also exhibited films in South Africa and Australia. The screenings in South Africa were the first public screenings of moving pictures in that country. After Australia, Hertz took the Theatrograph to Ceylon (Sri Lanka), India, China, Japan, the Fiji Islands, and Hawaii.

Georges Méliès purchased one of Paul's theatrographs in 1896.

Theatrographs Today

The National Science and Media museum in Bradford has a 1896, 35mm, Theatrograph projector, No 2, mark 1 and pedestal. This projector was the second one manufactured by Paul, and it was patented on March 2, 1896. It is created from cast iron and wood. This is one of the five models Paul created in his time in the Theatrograph business before quitting in 1910.

Link to the page from the museum about the theatrograph they have- Bradford, UK Science and Media museum
