= Carl Hertz =

American stage magician (1859–1924)

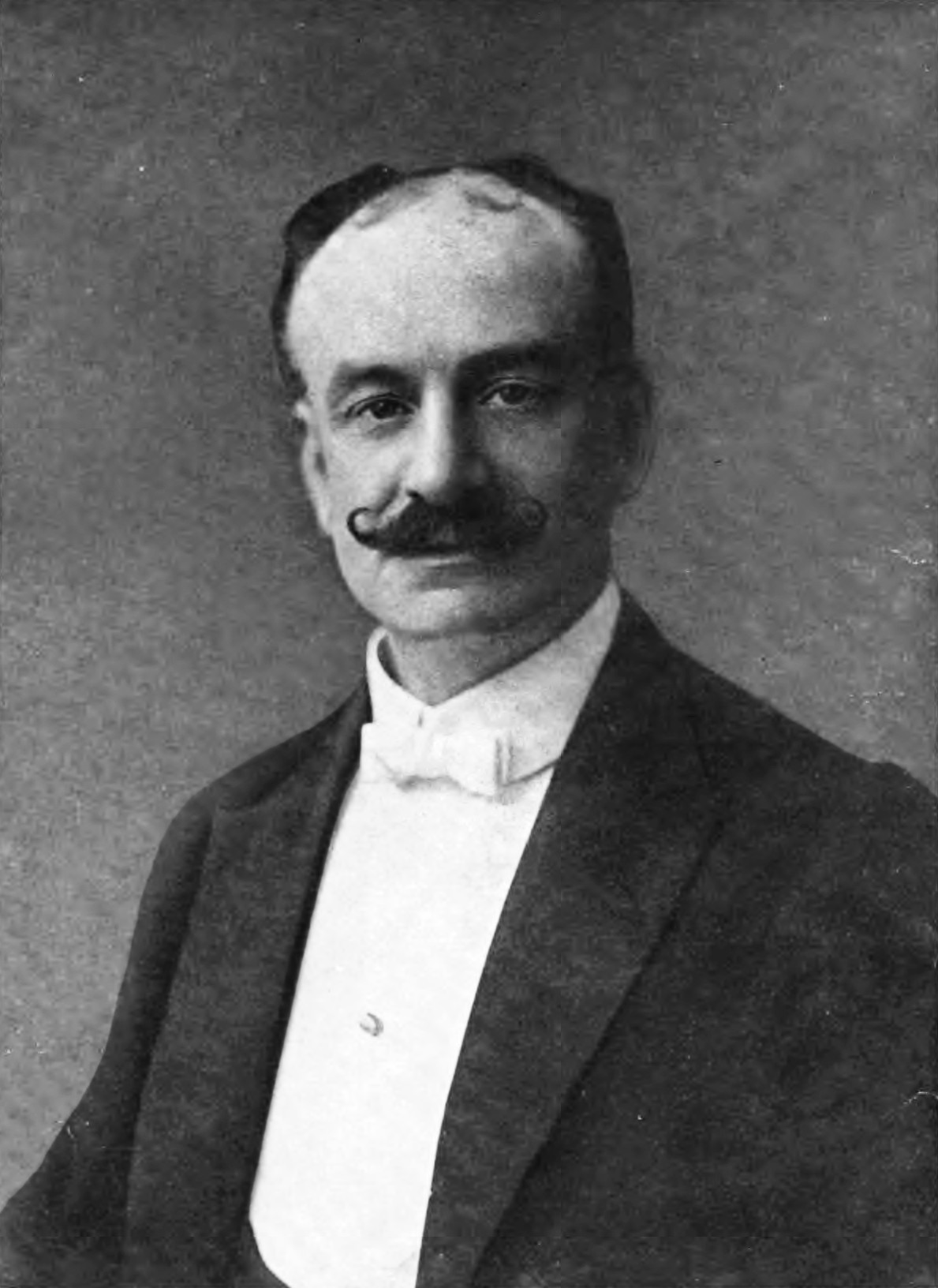
- Born: May 14, 1859
- Died: March 20, 1924 (aged 64)
- Occupation: Magician

Carl Hertz (May 14, 1859 – March 20, 1924) was an American magician.

== Biography ==
He was born Louis or Leib Morgenstein in San Francisco. After becoming proficient in the art of magic, he toured America, Europe and Australia, which he had first visited in 1892. He was one of several famous magicians who added films to their repertoires during the early years of cinematography.

He sailed from England on 28 March 1896 aboard the Royal Mail Ship RMS Norman and on the voyage exhibited Robert W. Paul's Theatrograph to the passengers. He also showed films to his audiences in Australia and Johannesburg, South Africa.

After Australia he toured Ceylon (now Sri Lanka), India, China, Japan, the Fiji Islands and Hawaii.

Hertz was a debunker of mediumship and spiritualism. He appeared at the prosecution for the medium Swami Laura Horos (also known as Mme. Diss Debar) trial in New York. Hertz helped send Horos to jail by duplicating in court the tricks she had used in her séances.

Hertz corresponded with the magician Harry Houdini about the tricks of spiritualist mediums. In 1923, Hertz had sent Houdini a letter revealing a trick he used to fool the jury at the court trial for Mme. Diss Debar. In his book A Magician Among the Spirits (1924), Houdini included a copy of this letter.

He was known for his magical acts. His "Aerolithe" illusion involved a girl dancing on air – a court case was brought that accused him of stealing it from a German magician. "Phoenix" illusion. His wife entered a furnace and emerged unscathed.

Known for the vanishing bird cage act. He was actually summoned to the British House of Commons on August 2, 1921 to prove that his act did not harm the birds. He performed the trick for them, then produced the unharmed bird.

He married Emilie D'Alton, a vocalist and his assistant. They had children. He published his autobiography in 1924, Modern Mystery Merchant; The Trials, Tricks and Travels of Carl Hertz, the Famous American Illusionist.
