= Jamoora =

Role in traditional south Asian folk theatre

A jamoora or jamura (Hindustani: जमूरा or جمورا) is a performer who plays a specific type of sidekick role in the traditional folk theatre (such as bhand and tamasha) of India and Pakistan. In the course of the performance, the jamoora is supposed to comply with every command given by his master (usually called the ustad, but sometimes called the madari or jadoogar for magic shows), but often demonstrates subtle deviations from them to make satirical points or create a humorous effect.

Shows involving jamooras are often two-person performances and are usually called ustad-jamoora, madari-jamoora, ustad-bachha (bachha means child) or madari-chela (chela means follower/student) shows.

== Connotations ==
Because the jamoora is expected to demonstrate unquestioning obedience to the master's directives, sometimes people or organizations who are believed to be acting as puppets for others are pejoratively called jamooras in Indian and Pakistani society.
