= John Booth (magician) =

American magician and author (1912–2009)

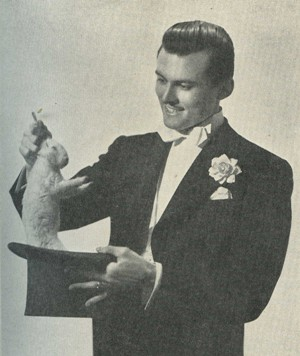
- John Booth, pictured in Marvels of Mystery, pulling a rabbit out of a hat.
- Born: John Nicholls Booth; 7 August 1912; Meadville, Pennsylvania
- Died: 11 November 2009 (aged 97); Los Alamitos, California
- Resting place: Lakeside Cemetery, Colon, Michigan
- Known for: Magician, author, lecturer

John Nicholls Booth (7 August 1912 – 11 November 2009) was an American professional magician and prolific author on the history of magic performance. He was recognized for his work, and is also known for having the longest running membership in the International Brotherhood of Magicians.

== Biography ==
Booth was born in Los Alamitos, California in 1912. His interest in magic began at age 10 with a magic set, and began performing semi-professionally at age 15. In 1928, Booth joined the International Brotherhood of Magicians and began publishing a serial column on magic history called "Memoirs of a Magician's Ghost" in their publication, The Linking Ring.

In 1934, Booth completed his college education at McMaster University and focused on magic performance as his profession. He began doing performances in high schools, but eventually was able to perform for nightclubs and hotel shows. Around this time, Booth began to write his first two books, Forging Ahead in Magic and Marvels of Mystery, which had later become classic reference works for magicians.

Later, Booth stopped doing show performances and left to become an ordained Unitarian Universalist minister in 1942. From personal accounts, Booth reported that he had been interested in becoming a minister, but was reluctant to begin seminary due to concerns about his own temperament. He said, "Finally, in 1940, my misgivings evaporated. I closed a two week engagement as a magician in the Schroeder Hotel in Milwaukee (now the Hilton) and went directly to the Meadville Theological School now located in Chicago, the seminary of my father 30 years earlier." He spent over 30 years as a minister in the Universalist Unitarian Church.

In 1986, Booth published the book Psychic Paradoxes. The book debunked the tricks of fraudulent mediums and psychics and was published by Prometheus Books.

Afterwards, Booth incorporated magic topics into personal lectures and produced historical documentaries on magic, and retired at the age of 88. Booth died at age 97 in 2009.

== Legacy ==
Booth is noted to be experienced as a nightclub magician who performed at premier hotels and venues, but his enduring contributions to magic were as a magic historian, as he documented magic performance through his own travels and experiences. He was purported to be one of the first to create documentaries for presentations and lectures on magic. One such account was about finding a genuine performance of the Indian rope trick, where he attempted to find a performer by paying for newspaper advertisements, but was ultimately unsuccessful at finding a true performance.

== Publications ==
- Magical Mentalism (1931)
- Forging Ahead in Magic (1939)
- Marvels of Mystery: A Professional Magician's Textbook of Conjuring Masterpieces (1941)
- Fabulous Destinations (1950)
- The John Booth Classics (1975)
- Psychic Paradoxes (1986)
- Dramatic Magic (1988)
- Wonders of Magic: A Veteran Magician's Book of Original Tricks, Concepts, Pictures, Memoirs, and Conjuring History (1986)
- Extending Magic Beyond Credibility (2001)

== Awards ==
In 1937, early in his career, Booth was given the Sphinx Award in category of Professional Magician from the magazine The Sphinx. The award was given for his notable "Can You Tie It?" effect submitted to and published in an earlier issue of the magazine, and noted its novelty and the subtlety of its methodology. Booth was awarded with the "John Nevil Maskelyne Prize" by The Magic Circle in 1987 for his literary contributions to magic performance. He was also honored by being added to the Society of American Magicians' Hall of Fame.
