= The Best of Magic =

- Genre: Magic
- Starring: Geoffrey Durham; Simon Mayo; Anthea Turner
- Country of origin: United Kingdom
- Original language: English
- No. of series: 2
- No. of episodes: 9

Production
- Running time: 60 mins
- Production company: Thames Television

Original release
- Network: ITV
- Release: 13 September 1989 – 19 September 1990

The Best of Magic is a British magic show produced by Thames Television for the ITV network that aired from 13 September 1989 to 19 September 1990. The show was hosted by Geoffrey Durham, Simon Mayo, and Anthea Turner, with frequent guest appearances by Arturo Brachetti and Max Maven.

== List of episodes ==
| Series | Episode | Air date | Guests |
|---|---|---|---|
| 1 | 1 | 13 September 1989 | Max Maven, Arturo Brachetti, Imam, The Pendragons, Princess Tenko |
| 1 | 2 | 20 September 1989 | Max Maven, Arturo Brachetti, Eugene Burger, Glenn Falkenstein, Franz Harary, Finn Jon |
| 1 | 3 | 27 September 1989 | Max Maven, Arturo Brachetti, John Gaughan, Tina Lenert, The Pendragons, Doctor Sawa |
| 1 | 4 | 4 October 1989 | Max Maven, Arturo Brachetti, James Dimmare, Hans Moretti, Channing Pollock, Juan Tamariz |
| 1 | 5 | 11 October 1989 | Max Maven, Arturo Brachetti, John Calvert, Joe Given, John MacGregor, Jeff McBride, Tommy Wonder |
| 1 | 6 | 18 October 1989 | Max Maven, Arturo Brachetti, Jerry Andrus, Harry Blackstone Jr., Vladimir Danilin, Marco Tempest |
| 2 | 1 | 5 September 1990 | Arturo Brachetti, Don Alan, Lance Burton, Howard De Courcy, Uri Geller, Milo and Roger |
| 2 | 2 | 12 September 1990 | Arturo Brachetti, Kohl & Co, Lisa Menna, The Pendragons, Richiardi Jr, Juan Tamariz |
| 2 | 3 | 19 September 1990 | Arturo Brachetti, David Berglas, Jeff McBride, Tom Mullica, Norm Nielsen |
