= Guy Hollingworth =

English barrister, conjurer, author and lecturer

Guy Hollingworth (born 1974) is an English barrister, conjurer, author and lecturer. As a conjurer he is known for his skillful performances of card magic and for his books and lectures in which he presents original tricks and routines.

== Career ==
Hollingworth first became interested in magic at the age of 13 when he was a pupil at St Paul's School, a private school in west London. The school has a magic club called The Prestige Society, which Hollingworth joined in preference over activities such as classics or sports practice which he would otherwise have been expected to do. He was inspired by seeing footage of magician Channing Pollock, which was shown as part of the television series The Best of Magic, broadcast by Thames Television in 1989–90. Hollingworth has stated that he was also influenced during the same period by seeing Ricky Jay perform on the Channel 4 television series The Secret Cabaret. Hollingworth began his performing career with a show at the school open day. He later graduated in industrial design and subsequently in law. At the same time he continued performing magic as well as developing new tricks. Such was his success that he also began to be asked to give lectures to other magicians. He currently works full-time as a barrister specialising in intellectual property law, but continues to give occasional magic performances.

Hollingworth's best known creation is his trick The Reformation, in which a signed playing card is torn into four pieces and then visibly restored one piece at a time. He is also well known for his book, Drawing Room Deceptions. Some of his card magic is presented in his commercially available videos The Reformation, The London Collection and Routines directed by filmmaker and magician Anthony Davis. He was also featured on NBC's World's Greatest Magic III TV special. In August 2008, he presented a well-received show at the Edinburgh Comedy Festival entitled "Expert at the Card Table", which was based on a 1902 book of the same title.

== Publications ==
- FISM Lecture Notes (limited edition)
- Drawing Room Deceptions (1999, Mike Caveney's Magic Words) ISBN 9780915181322
- Quartet: A card and ten routines therewith
- Waiting for Inspiration Lecture Notes

== Videos ==
- The Reformation (limited edition)
- The London Collection
- Routines
- The Hollingworth Collection (limited edition Box-Set with commemorative playing cards)

== Marketed tricks ==
- Quartet – a playing card, included with a booklet of 10 routines or separately in packs of 3
- Once Upon a Time – a small fairy tale book featuring three magical routines suitable for children

== Television appearances ==
- The World's Greatest Magic III (USA)
- Heroes of Magic (UK)
- Illusoes with Luis de Matos (Portugal)
- Britain's Worst Cheats (UK)
- 50 Greatest Magic Tricks (UK)
- The Five Greatest Magicians in the World (Japan)
- History of Magic – Close Up Magic (UK)
