= 50 Greatest Magic Tricks =

British TV programme

- Genre: Clip show; Documentary; Entertainment
- Written by: Adam and Joe
- Presented by: Adam and Joe
- Judges: The Magic Circle
- Narrated by: Adam and Joe
- Theme music composer: Mike Westergaard; Hansen Bass
- Country of origin: United Kingdom

Production
- Executive producer: Andrew O'Connor
- Producer: John Godfrey
- Editor: Jeffrey May
- Camera setup: Single-camera
- Production company: Objective

Original release
- Network: Channel 4
- Release: 6 May 2002

50 Greatest Magic Tricks is a one-off list show that was produced by Objective Productions for Channel 4. The programme counted down the fifty greatest magic tricks, as voted for by members of The Magic Circle. The illusion at number one was Death Saw by David Copperfield. The show was presented by British comedy duo Adam and Joe, who also wrote and narrated the programme. The show was first broadcast on Channel 4 on 6 May 2002.

== Magic tricks ==
1. David Copperfield – Death Saw (1995)
2. David Blaine – Levitation
3. The Pendragons – Metamorphosis
4. Lance Burton – Doves (1982)
5. Robert Harbin – Zig Zag Lady (1965)
6. David Copperfield – Flying (1995)
7. Tom Mullica – Smoking Trick (1996)
8. Paul Daniels – Chop Cup (1985)
9. Richard Ross – Linking Rings (1983)
10. Hans & Helga Moretti – The Crossbow (1995)
11. Penn & Teller – The Magic Bullet (1996)
12. David Blaine – Card Revelation
13. Harry Blackstone Jnr – Floating Lightbulb (1977)
14. Lance Burton – Rollercoaster (1999)
15. Simon Drake – Guillotine (1992)
16. Siegfried & Roy – Vanishing & Appearing Elephant (1994)
17. Amazing Orchante – Ball of String (1987)
18. Robert Gallup – Death Dive (1996)
19. Derren Brown – Blair Witch Illusion (2000)
20. Ishamuddin Khan – Indian Rope Trick (1999)
21. Simon Drake – Swords Illusion (1990)
22. Siegfried & Roy – Interlude (1994)
23. David Berglas – The Human Body (1986)
24. Amazing Jonathan – Knife Illusion (1996)
25. Paul Daniels – TV Camera Trick (1984)
26. Derren Brown – The Art Gallery (2000)
27. Paul Zenon – Tax Disc (2000)
28. Tommy Cooper – Multiplying Bottles (1967)
29. Amazing Jonathan – The Skewer (2001)
30. David Berglas – The Table (1981)
31. Great Soprendo – Torn and Restored Newspaper (Crackerjack, 1982)
32. Paul Daniels – Electric Chair (1989)
33. Penn & Teller – Snake Trick (1991)
34. James Hydrick – Telephone Pages (1980)
35. Robert Gallup – Straitjacket Escape (2000)
36. Lance Burton – Osmosis Illusion (1997)
37. Fay Presto – Bottle Trick (1996)
38. Stevie Starr – Goldfish (1992)
39. Spoon Bending
40. Paul Zenon – Snooker Card Trick (2000)
41. Melinda Saxe – The Drill of Death (1999)
42. Derren Brown – Subway Hypnosis (2001)
43. Meir Yedid – Fingertip Fantasies (1985)
44. Penn & Teller – Truck Trick (1990)
45. Mark Mottram – Thumb Tie (2000)
46. Harry Blackstone Jnr – Vanishing Bird Cage (1987)
47. Guy Hollingworth – The Reformation (1997)
48. Shahid & Lisa Malik – Sword Box (1991)
49. Juan Tamariz – 4 Blue Cards (1996)
50. Franz Harary – Vanishing Space Shuttle (1994)

== Reception ==
In a review of the programme, magician Ian Rowland praised the production of the show, saying that its content was "almost uniformly superb" and that it was a "golden credit to its makers". He was considerably more critical of Adam and Joe's presenting, calling the pair "dismal" and their contributions "an unmitigated disaster". Rowland also questioned the final list – he bemoaned the lack of close-up magic tricks in favour of large illusions on stage.

== Legacy ==
The special was featured in a 2018 episode of the BBC One show Pointless Celebrities. One hundred members of the public had been given 100 seconds to name, from memory, as many magicians on the list as possible. The episode's finalists, Robert Lindsay and his daughter Sydney Stevenson, then had to name any magician who had not been listed by the 100 people. Paul Daniels, David Copperfield, Penn & Teller, David Blaine, Tommy Cooper, Derren Brown and The Great Soprendo were the only magicians to be named by the 100 people.
