= Alan Carter (director) =

American television director (born 1959)

- Born: September 13, 1959 (age 66); Waco, Texas, U.S.
- Occupations: Television director, writer, editor, and producer
- Years active: 1993–present

Alan Carter (born September 13, 1959) is an American television director, producer, editor, and screenwriter. In the 1980s and 1990s, Carter worked as a music video editor. His big client was Phil Collins. He began working on television when he edited a David Copperfield Magic Special for CBS in 1993, winning his first of two Emmys.

== Filmography ==
Media
Year	Title	Credited as			Notes
Year	Title	Director	Editor	Producer	Notes
1993	Genesis: The Way We Walk - Live in Concert		Yes		2002 double DVD featuring live performances from the We Can't Dance tour by Genesis.
1994	Mickey's Fun Songs: Campout at Walt Disney World		Yes		Video short
1994	David Copperfield: 15 Years of Magic		Yes		TV movie documentary
1994	A Gala for the President at Ford's Theatre		Yes		TV special
1994	Mickey's Fun Songs: Let's Go to the Circus		Yes		Video short
1995	Best of Comedy Live	Yes	Yes		TV movie
1995	Mickey's Fun Songs: Beach Party at Walt Disney World		Yes		Video short
1996	The Hidden Secrets of Magic	Yes	Yes		TV movie
1997	Walt Disney World Easter Parade	Yes			TV special
1998	The World's Most Dangerous Magic	Yes			TV movie documentary
1998	Quincy Jones... The First 50 Years		Yes		TV movie documentary
1999	The World's Most Dangerous Magic II	Yes	Yes		TV movie documentary
1999	Up Close and Personal: The Search for Miss America	Yes			TV movie documentary
1999	79th Miss America Pageant		Yes		TV special
1999	5th Annual Screen Actors Guild Awards			Yes	TV special (Segment producer)
2000	The First Family's Holiday Gift to America: A Tour of the White House		Yes		TV special
2001	Teen Choice Presents: Teenapalooza	Yes			TV movie
2001	The Big Band Sound of WWII	Yes			TV movie
2001	United We Stand	Yes			TV special
2001–2002	Music in High Places	Yes	Yes		TV series documentary (director-4 episodes; editor- 3 episodes)
2002	CBS: 50 Years from Television City	Yes			TV movie
2002	Summer Music Mania 2002	Yes	Yes		TV movie
2003	CMT 100 Greatest Songs of Country Music Concert	Yes			TV special
2003	Miss America Pageant	Yes			TV special
2004	CMT 100 Greatest Love Songs of Country Music	Yes			TV special
2004	In Search of the Partridge Family	Yes			TV series documentary
2004	Miss America	Yes			TV special
2004	Nick & Jessica's Family Christmas	Yes			TV movie
2004	Moving Image Salutes John Travolta	Yes			TV movie
2004	Crosby, Stills & Nash: The Acoustic Concert		Yes		Video
2005	The 10th Annual Critics' Choice Awards	Yes			TV special

Director

2011-present The Voice (TV series)

2015 The 21st Annual Screen Actors Guild Awards (TV special)

2015 The 41st Annual People's Choice Awards (TV movie)

2011-2014 Shark Tank (TV series) (50 episodes)

The Biggest Loser (TV series) (5 episodes, 2009 - 2011) (director - 1 episode, 2013)

2012 The 38th Annual People's Choice Awards (TV special)

2010-2011 Minute to Win It (TV series) (60 episodes)

2011 The 37th Annual People's Choice Awards (TV special)

2010 The 2010 Miss Universe Pageant (TV special)

2010 The 36th Annual People's Choice Awards (TV special)

2009 The Newlywed Game (TV series) (1 episode)

2009 2009 CMT Music Awards (TV movie)

2008 Macy's Passport Celebrity Catwalk Challenge (TV special)

2008 Heroes: Countdown to the Premiere (TV Movie documentary)

2008 2008 ALMA Awards (TV movie)

2008 Last Comic Standing (TV series) (1 episode)

2008 2008 CMT Music Awards (TV special)

2008 Your Mama Don't Dance (TV series)

2008 Dance War: Bruno vs. Carrie Ann (TV series) (6 episodes)

2007 Clash of the Choirs (TV Mini-Series)

2007 Phenomenon (TV series) (5 episodes)

2007 2007 Taurus World Stunt Awards (TV special)

2007 2007 CMT Music Awards (TV special)

2007 The 2007 Miss America Pageant (TV movie)

2006 Great Performances (TV series) (2 episodes)

2006 VH1 Big in 06 Awards (TV movie)

2006 CMT Giants-Reba (TV series) (1 episode)

2006 Fuse Fangoria Chainsaw Awards (TV special)

2006 The One: Making a Music Star (TV series)

2006 The CMT Music Awards 2006 (TV special)

2006 12th Annual Screen Actors Guild Awards (TV special)

2006 The 11th Annual Critics' Choice Awards (TV Movie documentary)

2006 Moving Image Salutes Ron Howard (TV movie)

2006 Gretchen Wilson: Undressed (TV movie)

2005 Brad Paisley's Muddi Gras (TV movie)

2005 But Can They Sing? (TV series)

2005 Dancing with the Stars (Dance Off) (TV movie)

2005 My Kind of Town (TV series)

2005 Miss Universe 2005 (TV special)

2005 Nick & Jessica's Tour of Duty (TV movie)

2005 The CMT Music Awards (TV special)

2005 11th Annual Screen Actors Guild Awards (TV special)

1990 Shark Island "Bad For Each Other" (Music video)

Paris By Night 88, 90, 92 to 106, 108, 111, 120, 123, 129 (Vietnamese musical variety show)
