= Drill of Death =

The Drill of Death is a large-scale stage illusion in which a performer appears to be impaled on a giant drill. It was created by magician André Kole and illusion designer Ken Whitaker for magician Melinda Saxe. It was one of Saxe's signature tricks and featured as a highlight in her various First Lady of Magic shows.

The illusion featured in several network television magic specials. It was first shown on television in November 1995, when Melinda performed it on The World's Greatest Magic II broadcast by NBC. It later served as one of the big set pieces in Melinda's own Melinda, First Lady of Magic special produced by Disney and broadcast on CBS in March 1997. The television special 50 Greatest Magic Tricks, broadcast by Britain's Channel 4 in May 2002, named Drill of Death as number 41 in its list of the 50 greatest magic tricks of all time.

During Melinda's performing career she was the only magician presenting the illusion. She ceased performing in 2002 to raise a family, and since then, the drill has been performed by two illusionists in Europe, German illusionist Jan Rouven and Dutch Christian Farla. It featured in the 2005 edition of the annual German television special Stars in der Manege, in which actress, model, and TV presenter Arabella Kiesbauer played the role of victim.

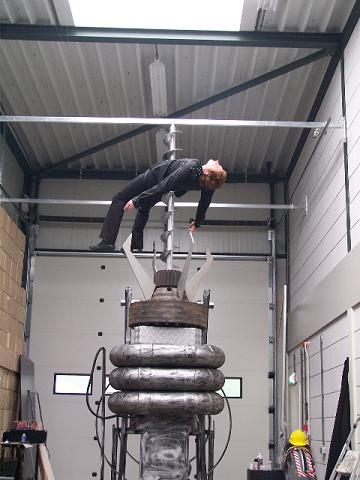
Christian Farla in his Warehouse near Rotterdam practising his Drill of Death

== Description of the effect ==
The effect is similar in some ways to the illusion Impaled, although Drill of Death is larger and features additional elements. It can be presented either as a straightforward penetration illusion or as an "escape gone wrong" piece, in which the audience is first given the impression it is an escapology act of the "predicament escape" type, and then given the shock of seeing it appear to go wrong with apparently fatal consequences for the performer.

The apparatus consists of a massive drilling machine mounted on a framework that is somewhat like a short section of railroad track. At one end of the track, nearest the audience, is a raised frame large enough to hold a person. At the beginning of the performance, the drill is positioned at the far end of the track with its long, helical drill bit pointing horizontally forwards. The performer is chained to the frame with her torso in line with the drilling axis. A cover, consisting of translucent paper stretched on a circular frame, is attached to the apparatus in front of the performer, obscuring the center of her torso. The machine is then started; the drill bit rotates and the machine begins advancing slowly towards the performer. Then, the device appears to go out of control and speeds up (sometimes with pyrotechnics for added drama). The drill appears to penetrate through the struggling performer, whose legs, shoulders, arms, and head remain in full view, and whose lower torso is seen in silhouette through the translucent cover. The tip of the drill emerges and rips through the cover, when both the forward motion and rotation of the drill bit stop. The cover is removed to show the limp body of the performer seemingly impaled on the end of the drill. The machine then begins to tilt the drilling axis upwards, in the process pulling the performer from her restraints and raising her high into the air. When the drill's axis is vertical, the bit begins to rotate again, spinning the performer's limply spreadeagled body around. The drill then stops and lowers the performer back onto the frame, where assistants cover her torso with a blanket and seemingly push the drill back out of her. The performer then appears to revive and steps from the apparatus to take a bow.
