= Gary Ouellet =

Gary Ouellet (January 9, 1945 – June 8, 2002) was a French-Canadian television producer and magician who lived and worked in the United States.

He may be best known as the driving force behind a number of network television specials that helped some of the top performers in modern magic to gain a national and international profile. He was also a lawyer and lobbyist.

== Life and career ==
Born in Canada, Ouellet became interested in magic as a boy after receiving a toy magic set as a present. As a teenager, he performed a magic act that was the opening for headliners at a prominent cabaret venue in Quebec City.

Later in life, Ouellet pursued magic part-time while making a career as a lawyer and as a government lobbyist. He was a member of the successful and sometimes controversial Ottawa lobbying firm Government Consultants International, started in 1984 with Frank Moores, Francis Fox, and Gerald Doucet.

After moving to the United States to pursue a career in the entertainment industry, Ouellet became a producer and was involved in founding several successful businesses, including the live show production company Area 52 Entertainment and his own firm Ouellet Entertainment Inc. He was also a partner in the television production firm OCT, which took its name from the last initials of partners Ouellet, Alan Carter and David Tumaroff.

In the 1990s Ouellet produced more than 50 hours of network television, including the five World's Greatest Magic shows and the two World's Most Dangerous Magic specials.

Ouellet settled in Los Angeles, California but also spent a considerable amount of time in Las Vegas because of its importance as a venue for magic shows. He wrote and directed a number of big Las Vegas stage shows, including Melinda "First Lady of Magic" starring Melinda Saxe, and a show with magician Steve Wyrick. He was also responsible for Saxe's 1997 television special. As well as contributing to magic through his production work he also wrote a number of books and made instructional videos and DVDs, in which he taught magic skills.

Gary was also a prominent lawyer before turning his talents to being an entertainment producer. Among other activities he was co-counsel on the Dubin Inquiry into Aviation Safety in Canada (1981/82). During the Mulroney era as Prime Minister, Ouellet and his business partner Frank Moores formed an Ottawa lobbying firm called Government Consultants International, which ultimately became embroiled in the Air Canada Airbus scandal and bribes paid by Karl-Heinz Schreiber.

== Death ==
Ouellet died of a heart attack in Portugal where he was working on a television production. Writing after Ouellet's death, magician Jonathan Pendragon stated:

Some producers create problems by toying with a performers act. The great producers know how to frame and place a performer so that their work is seen in the best light. Gary belonged to the second group. He loved magic, all magic, and cared deeply about every performer and the vast spectrum of styles that was paraded before the camera on what came to be known as the Gary specials. This is the affectionate nickname coined by those who were fortunate enough to be booked on the specials. We called them the Gary specials because Gary Ouellet worked for legendary producer Gary Pudney. It can honestly be said that these two men are responcibile for proving to the world that there were other great magicians besides David Copperfield. "In memory of Gary Q Ouellet". Camirand Academy of Magic Inc.
