= Dean Gunnarson =

Canadian escape artist

- Born: Dean Gunnarson; 27 January 1964 (age 62); Winnipeg, Manitoba, Canada
- Other name: "The World's Greatest Escape Artist " " World's Most Daring Escape Artist "
- Occupations: Magician, escapologist
- Years active: 1982–present

Dean Gunnarson (born 27 January 1964) is a Canadian escapologist (escape artist). He was born in Winnipeg, Manitoba and raised in San Antonio, Texas. He is noted for a series of large scale spectacular stunts done for television. Gunnarson has appeared on television in over 165 countries around the world performing his escapes. Gunnarson has performed over 500 shows across China and his TV escapes have been seen by millions of people there. In 2012 the Chinese Government presented him with "The World's Top Escape Artist" award after a successful escape on live TV. He has also performed across Canada and the US on TV, fairs, shopping malls, sporting events, and for many of the countries top corporations.

== Career ==
Gunnarson narrowly escaped death in October 1983 during a stunt in which he was handcuffed and chained and nailed into a coffin which was then submerged into the Red River in Winnipeg. The stunt went wrong as the coffin was lowered into the water, leaving him unable to escape. He was eventually pulled from the river and freed by the support crew, at which point he was not breathing and had to be resuscitated by paramedics. The incident led Johnny Carson to refer to Gunnarson on The Tonight Show as "that crazy Canadian".

Gunnarson has appeared in several television specials. In the 1987 special The Search for Houdini, Gunnarson replicated two of Houdini's most famous escapes. In 1988, he appeared in the NBC special Magic in The Magic Kingdom, filmed at Disneyland. He also appeared in The Spectacular World of Guinness Records, hosted by David Frost where Gunnarson set two world records for escaping. In 1998, Gunnarson appeared in NBC's specials The World's Most Dangerous Magic, where he escaped from a straitjacket while hanging upside down 726 feet above the ground from a trapeze suspended from the Hoover Dam. He appeared again the following year in The World's Most Dangerous Magic II, where he escaped suspended upside down over a swamp of 130 hungry alligators in the Florida Everglades covered in chicken meat and blood.

Some of Dean's other television appearances include The Nashville Network's popular "Statler Brothers Show", the Disney Channel and Family Channel, where he is a favourite family entertainer. He also has appeared on many shows on Discovery Channel, TLC, Travel Channel and even on Food Network. One of Dean's personal career highlights was opening for Aerosmith at their CD Release Party of "Nine Lives" in New York City.

In 2012 Gunnarson won the Merlin Award for "World's Best Escape Artist". Presented in Shenzhen, China by The International Society of Magicians, the world's largest magic organization with over 37,000 members. Founded in 1968 it was the first time ever that they have given the award to an escape artist. Past winners are David Copperfield, Doug Henning, Penn & Teller, and Criss Angel. Gunnarson is widely considered the Greatest living escape artist in the world today because of his legendary escapes performed around the world over such a long career.

In February 2013 Ripley's Believe It or Not presented Gunnarson with the Ripley's record "World's Most Daring Escape Artist" while in New York for the Anderson Cooper Live TV show with Anderson Cooper and co-host Stacey London. Gunnarson performed a difficult escape on the TV show. He has also been featured in many Ripley's books including a two-page colour spread in "Ripley's-The Remarkable Revealed" pages 130–131, where he was buried alive in 2 1/2 tons of wet cement and escaped.

In 2015, Dean Gunnarson starred in the Canadian reality TV series Escape or Die!. The series was sold to numerous countries around the world. The series follows Dean and his team as he travels around the world attempting daring escapes.

Gunnarson was also the first recipient and only escape artist to ever win the "Houdini Award" presented on the Magic Stars television show in Tokyo, Japan. He became the youngest person and first Canadian to be awarded the U.C.T. "Humanitarian of the Year" for his devotion to raising money for various charities after being chosen out of 185,000 people nominated in North America.

== Major stunts ==
- Buried Alive, where he dug himself out of a grave after being buried for two days with no food or water on Friday 29 October 2010 and escaped on 31 October 2010 to coincide with Harry Houdini's date of death.
- Cement Tomb Escape – Gunnarson was handcuffed, chained and buried alive under 2 1/2 tons of wet cement on 31 October 2008.
- Houdini's Milk Can Escape for the Search for Houdini television special on Halloween Night, 1987 – he was a last minute replacement for James Randi, who was injured just before his scheduled live performance.
- The Challenge at Hoover Dam straitjacket escape hanging by his toes from a trapeze 726 feet over Hoover dam on The World's Most Dangerous Magic – 30 August 1998
- Gator Bait on The World's Most Dangerous Magic 2 – 2 May 1999 – escape from a straitjacket and chains while hung upside down by his toes from a trapeze above 130 hungry alligators at Gatorland in Florida.
- Airplane Jump for the 500th episode of the Japanese television show Naruhudo! The World – Chained with handcuffs, locked in a straitjacket and thrown from an airplane 13,500 feet in the air Gunnarson had one minute of freefall in which to release himself and open his parachute.
- Tractor Pull – Chained between two 450 horsepower tractors and had to escape before Gunnarson was pulled to pieces (9 June 2007).
- Car Crusher Escape for the television show "The Spectacular World of Guinness Records", hosted by David Frost. He was handcuffed and chained into a 1970 Cadillac, with his neck chained to the steering wheel, his legs to the brake pedal, and his arms to the doors.
- Beer Can Escape – handcuffed and chained inside a 200-liter can of beer and escaped. The famous Trailer Park Boys from their TV show dumped beer and ice over Gunnarson as he was shoved into the over flowing beer can. Gunnarson received International media coverage for his crazy escape.
- Roller Coaster Escape chained to the tracks of a Bullet Coaster in China.
- Houdini's Chinese Water Torture Cell
- Shark Cage Escape
- Packing Crate Escape
- Car Wash Escape
- Under Water Coffin Escape
- Hanging Upside Down Burning Rope Escape
- Death Cage – Zhangjaijei, China
- Burning Viking Ship Escape – Iceland
- Snake Temple Escape – Malaysia
- Russian Death Tank

== Awards ==
- 2013 Ripley's Record New York, N.Y. – Ripley's Believe It Or Not – World's Most Daring Escape Artist
- 2012 Merlin Award Shenzhen, China – International Magicians Society – World's Best Escape Artist
- 2004 Silver Cuffs Award Indianapolis, U.S. – Life Time Achievement Award for his many extreme and daring escapes over nearly three decades of performing
- Guinness World Records Los Angeles, U.S. – Set two World records for escaping on the TV Show Spectacular World of Guinness Records
- Humanitarian of the Year Chicago, U.S. – United Commercial Travelers presented the Award out of 185,000 Nominated in North America for Dean's devotion to help raise money for numerous charities
- Houdini Award Tokyo, Japan – Magic Star TV Awards Show- Legendary movie actor Tony Curtis, who played Houdini in 1953 movie about Houdini, presented Houdini Award for " World's Greatest Escape Artist"

== See also ==
- Escape Or Die!
