= Escape or Die! =

2015 Canadian reality TV series

- Genre: Documentary
- Written by: Chris Charney; Trevor Suffield; John Titley; Eric Weinthal
- Directed by: John Barnard; Jeff Newman
- Starring: Dean Gunnarson; Cary Tardi; Jeff Gunnarson; Ava Darrach-Gagnon; John MacDonald
- Composer: Mitch Dorge
- Country of origin: Canada
- No. of seasons: 1
- No. of episodes: 12

Production
- Executive producer: Kyle Bornais
- Producers: Scott R. Leary; Tony Wosk
- Production locations: China; Colombia; Iceland; Texas; Florida; Manitoba; India; Quebec; Malaysia; West Virginia; Bahamas
- Production company: Farpoint Films

Original release
- Network: OLN
- Release: April 14 – June 30, 2015

Escape Or Die! was a Canadian reality television series produced by Farpoint Films that premiered in Canada in 2015 on OLN. Starring escape artist Dean Gunnarson, the series showed the behind-the-scenes preparations and escapes filmed in various locations around the world. The series featured Cary Tardi, Jeff Gunnarson, Ava Darrach-Gagnon, and John MacDonald as part of Dean's team that helped make the escapes happen and keep him safe. The show also featured appearances by magician and skeptic James Randi and Colombian magician Gustavo Lorgia.

The series won a Golden Sheaf Award at the 2016 Yorkton Film Festival for Best Documentary Series.

== Personnel ==
- Dean Gunnarson – escape artist
- Cary Tardi – theatrics expert
- Jeff Gunnarson – safety expert
- Ava Darrach-Gagnon – office manager
- John MacDonald – blacksmith

== Episodes ==
No.	Title	Directed by	Written by	Location	Original release date
1	"Shanghai Express"	John Barnard	Chris Charney	Shanghai, China; Riding Mountain National Park, Manitoba, Canada	April 14, 2015
Dean Gunnarson attempts to defend his title of World's Most Daring Escape Artist by escaping from one of Shanghai's biggest and fastest roller coasters – the same one that shattered his ankle the last time he attempted this escape.
2	"Burning, Bound and Upside Down Escape"	John Barnard	Eric Weinthal	Zipaquira, Columbia; Riding Mountain National Park, Manitoba, Canada	April 21, 2015
Dean is bound in a straight jacket, hanging upside down 45 meters over the deadly cobblestone square of Zipaquira, Columbia. The clock is ticking and the only thing between Dean and a deadly fall are two rapidly burning ropes.
3	"Viking Funeral Escape"	Jeff Newman	John Titley	Reykjavík, Iceland; Riding Mountain National Park, Manitoba, Canada	April 28, 2015
Dean is reclaiming his Icelandic roots by attempting to escape from a burning Viking ship in the middle of the North Atlantic. Dean must break free of chains, reach the Viking sword, cut himself free, and swim to shore before the ship explodes.
4	"Deadly Dallas Draft Escape"	Jeff Newman	Eric Weinthal	Dallas, Texas; Riding Mountain National Park, Manitoba, Canada	May 5, 2015
Everything's bigger in Texas (including the beer cans) which are dangerous. Dean is in Dallas, Texas, attempting an escape that almost killed Harry Houdini. Dean will be locked up in chains and then submerged in a full can of beer. He must escape the chains and not drown before a live, cheering crowd.
5	"Death Tank Escape"	John Barnard	Eric Weinthal	Miami, Florida; Riding Mountain National Park, Manitoba, Canada	May 12, 2015
Dean has spent years honing his escape skills to face the Death Tank, once used in WWII as a torture chamber. Dean is in Miami, Florida, to change the course of history and be the only person to escape this death trap.
6	"Man vs. Machine Escape"	Jeff Newman	John Titley	Brandon, Manitoba; Winnipeg, Manitoba; Riding Mountain National Park, Manitoba, Canada	May 19, 2015
Dean returns home to icy Winnipeg, Canada, and his old nemesis, the Red River. Dean will be torn apart by two massive machines, chained on each side as he struggles to break free from his constraints, or he will be splayed on the ice.
7	"Buried Alive Escape"	John Barnard	Eric Weinthal	Udupi, India; Riding Mountain National Park, Manitoba, Canada	May 26, 2015
Dean will be wrapped in chains inside a steel coffin, locked tightly, and buried alive. Dean will be clawing his way up from six feet below in Udupi, India for 24 hours.
8	"Death Cage Escape"	John Barnard	Chris Charney	Zhangjiajie, China; Riding Mountain National Park, Manitoba, Canada	June 2, 2015
High up in the isolated mountains of Zhangjiajie, China, Dean is chained, caged, and hauled 45 meters into the sky. He has minutes to escape before the cage plunges him to his death in the river below.
9	"Blazing Ball of Death Escape"	John Barnard	Trevor Suffield	Quebec; Riding Mountain National Park, Manitoba, Canada	June 9, 2015
Quebec's world-famous ice hotel is the backdrop for Dean's blazing ball of flames escape. The burning ball is positioned to drop and crush Dean in 90 seconds if he doesn't break free of his chains frozen in 500 kg of ice.
10	"Malaysia Viper Escape"	Jeff Newman	John Titley	Malaysia; Riding Mountain National Park, Manitoba, Canada	June 15, 2015
Dean has one fear...SNAKES. So...Dean and the team are at the Snake Temple in Malaysia where Dean will be in a glass box while handcuffed with deadly vipers crawling over him. He needs to break out before getting bitten or passing out.
11	"Haunted Asylum Escape"	John Barnard	Chris Charney & Trevor Suffield	West Virginia; Riding Mountain National Park, Manitoba, Canada	June 23, 2015
The Society of American Magicians has challenged Dean to defend his "World's Most Daring Escape Artist" title by breaking out of West Virginia's most haunted asylum. He must ALSO find his team and free them in less than 60 minutes in over 25,000 square feet of hospital, at night, with no light.
12	"Underwater Coffin Escape"	John Barnard	Eric Weinthal	Bahamas; Riding Mountain National Park, Manitoba, Canada	June 30, 2015
Dean died attempting the underwater coffin escape 30 years ago. He was brought back to life. Dean is intent on doing this escape again but this time in an ocean rather than a river, in a coffin with holes and with sharks surrounding him.
