= Gary Stadler =

American musician

Gary Stadler (1949–2026) was an American new-age pianist, composer, songwriter and producer, specializing in contemporary Celtic-influenced themes and atmospheres. Stadler's six albums generally focus on imaginative concepts loosely based in Celtic mythology, especially stories of fairy realm. His music combines melodic elements of rare world instruments, mastery of synthesizer orchestrations and studio techniques. He has collaborated with vocalists Singh Kaur and Wendy Rule.

Stadler's third album, Fairy Heartmagic was listed on Billboard's New Age Top 25 chart for four weeks in year 2000. Several of his songs have been featured on compilations on multiple record labels in the US and Europe.

Stadler passed away on May 31st, 2026. He was the brother of professional golfer Craig Stadler.

== Background and artistic development ==
Stadler grew up in San Diego. In school, he learned to play the piano and most common orchestral instruments. Becoming an orchestra conductor was a childhood aspiration of his.

In 1993 he wrote the songs "Dream Spell" and "Awakening" for a local play The Goblin's Bride, based on Celtic fairy-realm myths. Those songs were the genesis of his first album, Fairy of the Woods, released by Sequoia Records in 1996, and well received by the alternative market of independent New Age bookstores.

As he garnered a following, Stadler added vocals and moved into a more acoustic direction on his second album released in 1998, Fairy NightSongs, featuring the voice of Singh Kaur, known to New Age listeners for her Crimson Series of recordings with harpist Kim Robertson.

Stadler's third record was Fairy HeartMagic in 2000, a collaboration with Celtic harpist Lisa Lynne, and vocalist "Stephannie" the sister of a friend filling in for Singh Kaur after her death. Stephannie composed lyrics recalled from dreams in a form of glossolalia she referred to as a new language of Celtic fantasy. It was released on Sequoia Records in October 2000 and recognized on Billboard's New Age Top 25. The song "Fairy NightSongs" from this album was awarded JPF Best New Age/World song of 2004 following its appearance on a compilation.

Stadler's fourth album, Reflections of Faerie, in 2003 returned to instrumental pieces reminiscent of his first release, mostly on solo piano, and once again the harp of Lisa Lynne. In 2004, for his fifth release Deep Within a Faerie Forest, Stadler collaborated with singer and composer Wendy Rule of Australia. His sixth album, Faerie Lullabies was a retrospective produced in 2006 in which he chose the most peaceful and comforting pieces from his earlier releases and re-recorded them in the form of instrumental lullabies, intended for both children and their parents.

Stadler's song "Fairy of the Woods" was featured on the soundtrack of A Magickal Life: Jeff McBride, produced and broadcast by Canada's VisionTV, a one-hour episode of their series Enigma True-Life Stories in January 2006. His former wife Tamara contributed lyrics to his albums as well as the albums of fellow Vegas Vortex musical group Zingaia.

== Album artwork ==
The artwork on the first two of Stadler's six albums was created by San Diego artist Scott Thom, known for his original airbrush paintings and New Age greeting cards. Las Vegas artist Katlyn Breene of Zingaia (who also wrote some of the lyrics on Fairy NightSongs and Fairy HeartMagic) created the artwork for Stadler's remaining albums.

== Other interests ==
Stadler has worked in stage lighting and laser art (one of his first careers), producing "wet" light shows and laser light shows in the 1970s and 1980s, owning and operating an electronic design/manufacturing company from the mid-1970s through the late 1990s, and winning a Technical Achievement Oscar in 1994 for innovations in the film lighting industry. He has used these skills for events produced by the Vegas Vortex, and stage magic productions of Jeff McBride, as well as the creation of temporary art installations at the Burning Man festivals.

Stadler has also specialized in technical and historical glassblowing, particularly the manufacture of distillation equipment for essential oils.

== Discography ==
=== Solo instrumental albums ===
- Fairy of the Woods (1996, Sequoia Records)
- Reflections of Faerie (2003, Sequoia Records)
- Faerie Lullabies (2006, Sequoia Records)

=== Album collaborations with vocalists ===
- Fairy NightSongs with Singh Kaur (1998, Sequoia Records)
- Fairy HeartMagic with Stephannie (2000, Sequoia Records)
- Deep within a Faerie Forest with Wendy Rule (2005, Sequoia Records)

=== Album producer ===
- This Universe by Singh Kaur (2005, Sequoia Records)

=== Compilations including recordings by Gary Stadler ===
- Musical Healing (2001, Sequoia Records)
- Mystic Celtic (2002, BSC Music GmbH)
- Buddha-Lounge (2002, Sequoia Records)
- Qi Gong (2003, BSC Music GmbH)
- Celticum Mysticum (2004, Prudence Recordings)
- Perfect Balance, Musical Healing Vol 2 (2005, Sequoia Records)
- Celtic Lounge (2005, Sequoia Records)
- Celtic Lounge II (2007, Sequoia Records)
