= Bill Malone (magician) =

American entertainer/magician/actor (born 1958)

- Born: July 22, 1958 (age 66); Chicago, Illinois
- Occupation(s): Magician, Entertainer, Lecturer, Author, Teacher, Comedian
- Website: Bill Malone, CEO of Comedy Magic

Bill Malone (born July 22, 1958) is an American entertainer/magician/actor who specializes in card magic, close-up magic and corporate events.

Malone was raised in Chicago, Illinois, and became interested in magic at the age of 17. He is a recipient of the Merlin Award from the International Magicians Society. He appeared on many network specials including the first The World's Greatest Magic special, The World's Wildest Magic special, as well as The Champions of Magic special.

Malone moved to Fort Lauderdale, Florida, where he owned and operated a comedy magic club called Houdini's Pub. He was partners with Wayne Huizenga at the Boca Raton Resort where they created Malone's Magic Bar.

Malone is best known for his presentations for several Fortune 500 companies.

== Publications ==
- On the Loose, a four-volume instructional DVD set of close-up magic
- Here I Go Again, a three-volume instructional DVD set of card magic
- Malone Meets Marlo, a six-volume instructional DVD set of material from Malone's mentor Ed Marlo
