= Wendy Rule =

- Born: Wendy Elizabeth Rule; 31 October 1966 (age 59); Sydney, New South Wales, Australia
- Origin: Melbourne, Victoria, Australia
- Genres: Pagan Folk; goth
- Occupation: Singer-songwriter,
- Instruments: Vocals, Guitar
- Website: wendyrule.com

Wendy Elizabeth Rule (born 31 October 1966) is an Australian singer songwriter and teacher of Modern Pagan spirituality. She was born in Sydney but moved to Melbourne as a baby, and lived there until she moved to the USA in 2016. She now lives in the small historic city of Las Vegas, New Mexico. She has released an extensive catalogue of original albums, and still performs regularly in the USA, Australia and Europe.

== Early life ==
Raised in Blackburn, Victoria (a suburb of Melbourne) in what was once an old farm house with a sprawling and overgrown backyard, Rule developed an early love of nature and wild places. Since early childhood Rule loved to sing, especially when alone in nature. In 1983, at the age of 15, Rule had her first experiences of performing to an audience when she performed the lead role in her high school musical, after which she dedicated herself to singing, taking weekly classical singing lessons, which she continued until her early 20s.

At the age of 25, just after her son Reuben was born, Rule discovered her Pagan spiritual path. She had always had an interest in fairies, mythology, tarot and the occult, but when she came across a white magic guidebook in a bookshop, she described it as being "like BANG! This is what I'm meant to be doing!" She began prolifically writing songs about Magic, Witchcraft and mythology, which formed the songs for her first album, Zero (1996).

== Career ==
=== Musical style ===
Rule combines elements of folk and cabaret, with gothic soundscapes and lush arrangements. Since her first album, Zero, was released in 1996, Rule has collaborated with UK cellist Rachel Samuel, who continues to feature on her albums. Percussionist Elissa Goodrich has also been a regular musical collaborator, especially on the Persephone double album (2019).

Rule both composes and performs vocals on her albums. Since her third album World Between Worlds (2000), she also performs acoustic and electric guitars on each of her major albums.

=== Live performance ===
From 1995, Rule toured Australia regularly. In 2001, she embarked on her first international tour (USA, UK, Europe), with her then 8-year-old son Reuben in tow. She continued to tour overseas every year, taking Reuben out of school for their annual adventure together. Reuben now continues the tradition of international touring as a member of the band RVG.

Although now often touring as a solo acoustic artist (guitar and vocals), Rule forged her original-music career with a three-piece band featuring Rachel Samuel on cello and Craig Patterson on keyboards. She continues to perform live with Rachel Samuel (now based in the UK), when their touring schedules allow.

=== Record label ===
Although her first two albums were signed to a small Melbourne-based label (Viridian Records), Rule separated from them in time for her third album (World Between Worlds, 2000) to be a fully independent release. She has continued to maintain an independent career, and manages her own touring and publicity.

=== Theology ===
She is a practising Witch and her lyrics typically address pagan and mythological themes. She has publicly spoken about her belief in polytheism, and her lyrics have been used in Wiccan ritual. She happily discusses her Pagan faith openly, and it continues to inform her music and teachings.

== Discography ==
- Zero (1996) – her first solo album, which took 9 months to record.
- Live (1997) [Limited Release]
- Deity (1998) – established her "lush Gothic sound."
- A Journey to the Underworld – a musical play focussing on the Inanna mythology. Divided into two sections, "Death" and "Life". Recorded at Melbourne's Universal Theatre and released on VHS video (1999).
- World Between Worlds (2000)
- The Lotus Eaters (2003)
- A Night of Jazz (2004)
- collaboration with Gary Stadler: Deep within a Faerie Forest (2005, Sequoia Records)
- The Wolf Sky (2006) – produced in a style described as "wild, epic, dark and beautiful."
- Meditations on the 4 Elements (2007)
- Beneath The Below Is A River (2008)
- Guided by Venus (2010)
- Live At The Castle On The Hill (2012)
- Black Snake (2014)
- Vox Solfeggio (with Timothy van Diest) (2017)
- Persephone (2019)
- Meadowlark (2024)
- Darkness and Light (2025)

=== Compilations featuring tracks by Rule ===
- The Best of Pagan Song (2004, Serpentine Music Productions)
- with Gary Stadler: Celtic Lounge (2006, Sequoia Records)
- with Gary Stadler: Celtic Lounge II (2007, Sequoia Records)
- Tuatha Dea featuring Wendy Rule. Track: Aradia
