= Ishamuddin Khan =

Indian magician

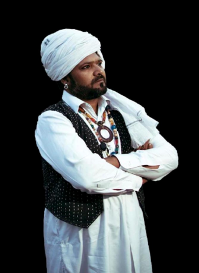
Indian Traditional Magician Ishamuddin Khan

Ishamuddin Khan is an Indian Madari magician who has performed the Indian rope trick and toured many countries in Europe and Asia.

== Background ==
Indian performing arts such as traditional magic, snake charming, juggling, and acrobatics through tribal families and date back to periods of ancient civilizations. Similarly, Ishamudin learned his craft from his father, such as sleight of hand and disappearance tricks.

Although the Indian rope trick was believed to be a myth, Ishamudin spent years researching the trick, such as reading about the performance in the "Jahangir Nama" the autobiography of Jahangir the 17th century Indian Emperor, in the travel logs of Fa-yanh and Ibne-Batuta. He talked to elders in his clan, but no one could remember hearing of the trick being performed. Thinking of the tools available to legendary musicians, Ishamudin came up with an approach that he tried for a small group of select people and further refined the trick before presenting to a large group.

== Great Indian Rope Trick ==
In 1995, Ishamuddin performed the legendary Indian rope trick before a group of people in Delhi.

Ishamudin successfully performed the Indian rope trick before a crowd of 25,000 people on a beach, including celebrities, ministers, and senior bureaucrats to celebrate the 20th millennium. The event was recorded and telecasted by CNN, BBC, Doordarshan and London Television stations.

== Television shows and documentaries ==
- Penn & Teller's Magic & Mystery tour, Yap Communication, Canada
- In Search of the Rope Trick, In-flight Production, London
- 50 Greatest Magic Tricks, Channel 4. Ishamuddin and the Indian rope trick, is listed as the 20th of the greatest magic trick.
- It's Show Time, Nippon T.V, Japan
- Discovery
- CNN
- BBC
- Doordarshan

== Tours ==
Ishamudin has toured France, Sweden, Germany, Dubai, Switzerland, Austria, Japan, Ireland, Poland, and Britain.
