= Frances Willard (magician) =

American magician (born 1940)

Frances Louise Willard (born December 12, 1940) is an American magician.

The daughter of magician Harry Willard (1896–1970), who performed as "Willard the Wizard", she began her career at age six as an assistant to her father. After her divorce from Texas newspaper editor Glenn Tucker, with whom she had three children (including Margo), she married magician Glenn Falkenstein. Their signature trick was the "spirit cabinet" illusion, a variation of which Willard had performed as a solo act. They received the Dunninger Award, the Milbourne Christopher Award of Excellence, and were inducted into the Society of American Magicians' Hall of Fame. Falkenstein died on July 4, 2010, of Alzheimer's disease.

Willard is the mother-in-law of magician Michael Ammar.
