= Geoffrey Durham =

British comedy magician and actor (born 1949)

- Born: 22 July 1949 (age 76); East Molesey, Surrey, England
- Occupations: Actor, magician
- Years active: 1974–2006
- Spouse(s): Victoria Wood (m. 1980; div. 2005) Helen Morris Brown (m. 2014)
- Children: 2

Geoffrey Durham (born 22 July 1949) is a British comedy magician and actor who was known for many years as "the Great Soprendo".

== Early life ==
Durham was born in East Molesey, Surrey, England. At the age of ten, he developed an interest in magic and performed occasional shows for friends and relatives. By the age of 13, however, that interest had waned. He later studied Spanish at Leeds University and then took a job as a stage-hand at the Leeds City Varieties Theatre. He worked there for 18 months, ending up as head flyman, and then left to become an actor.

After working in various stage shows for several years his interest in magic was rekindled while preparing for a show in Liverpool, in which his character performed some tricks. He dug out some of his old props and found he enjoyed learning and performing magic so much that he decided to make it his new career.

== Magic career ==
Durham presented a magic act as an outrageous Spanish magician for 14 years before performing as himself. As 'The Great Soprendo', Durham appeared in many children's TV shows, including Crackerjack, and appeared in theatres all over the country. His catchphrase was "Piff Paff Poof!" Due to his popularity in the 1980s as a children's star, Durham performed in pantomime every year as 'The Great Soprendo'. His last appearance in panto was for the 1989/90 season.

After ditching his disguise as the Great Soprendo in late 1988, Durham has had continued success in his own right. He was hired by TV producer John Fisher to co-host a series for Thames Television, The Best of Magic, in 1989. He returned to co-host the second series in 1990. He was a regular contributor to the Channel 4 game show Countdown, and his Newspaper Tear featured on the 50 Greatest Magic Tricks on the same channel. He occasionally appeared as one of the Puzzle Panel on BBC Radio 4.

Durham acted as magic consultant on the Doctor Who story The Greatest Show in the Galaxy in 1988. He coached Sylvester McCoy in magic for the scenes in Part Four, in which the Doctor performs a magic show in the Dark Circus to appease the Gods of Ragnarok. Durham received an on-screen credit for his work.

Durham is a member of the Inner Magic Circle, and was presented with the Maskelyne Award in 2002. Durham had previously refused to join the Magic Circle because membership was only open to men, and was instead a member of the International Brotherhood of Magicians.

Durham appeared in the 1987 film Wish You Were Here, which starred Emily Lloyd and Tom Bell.

== Personal life ==
Durham married the writer and comedian Victoria Wood in March 1980, but they separated in October 2002 and were later divorced. The couple had a daughter, Grace, and a son, Henry. Durham remarried in December 2014.

In 1994, Durham went to a Quaker meeting and became a member of the Society of Friends two years later. He has described his life with Quakers as "the single most inspiring, moving and rewarding thread running through the whole of my adult life". He was involved for many years with the Quaker outreach programme Quaker Quest, and he remains a regular speaker at Quaker events. He has written The Spirit of the Quakers and Being a Quaker: A Guide for Newcomers.
