= Glenn Falkenstein =

American magician and mentalist

- Born: Glenn Jacob Falkenstein; February 3, 1932; Grew up in Chicago, but was born in Los Angeles at the new Cedars of Lebanon Hospital at 4833 Fountain Ave.
- Died: July 4, 2010 (aged 78); San Antonio, Texas, U.S.A.
- Education: speech pathologist
- Occupation: Mentalist / Pathologist
- Employer: Los Angeles school district for autistic children
- Spouse: Frances Willard
- Parent(s): Louise and Ruth Dixie Falkenstein

Glenn Jacob Falkenstein (February 3, 1932 – July 4, 2010) was a magician and mentalist, and partner to Frances Willard from 1978 to 2010.

== Career ==
As a mentalist, Falkenstein was at the top of his profession for more than three decades and featured internationally on stage, TV and radio. He was the opening act for many stars, including Ann-Margret at the Las Vegas Hilton and Marty Robbins in Lake Tahoe. He was a guest star on Hilly Rose' talk show in the 1970s, and eventually was given his own talk shows on KMPC and KFI. When Falkenstein performed his mental feats on KGBS Radio Star Theatre, which broadcast from Universal Studios, the switchboard reflected ten thousand incoming calls per day. Many of these radio shows were recorded and will be digitized in 2020. Mr. Falkenstein appeared on The Tonight Show, That's Incredible!, The Merv Griffin Show, ABC's Wide World of Entertainment, The Best of Magic - Thames TV, The Paul Daniels Magic Show - BBC, Mandrake's Award - Paris, Magic Olympics - Asahi TV Tokyo, Magicians' Favorite Magicians - CBS and was featured on his own special on SBS television in Seoul, Korea to a viewing audience of over ten million.

Falkenstein and his partner/wife, Frances Willard, have been consecutive award-winners at the Magic Castle in Hollywood, California where they were Honorary Life Members. The Academy of Magical Arts voted Falkenstein Stage Magician of The Year two consecutive years. In 1978, Glenn joined forces with Frances Willard, daughter of legendary tent showman Harry "Willard the Wizard". Together, the couple presented Glenn's signature blindfold act followed by the classic Willard Spirit Cabinet. Throughout the 1980s and 1990s, Falkenstein & Willard entertained countless film stars, socialites, and national leaders with their classic feats of mentalism. In 1990, Frances Willard & Glenn Falkenstein received the Jack Stuart "DRAGON Award" presented to couples who integrated drama, romance, artistry, glamour, originality and necromancy into their acts. Glenn and Frances also received "The Dunninger Award" and "Milbourne Christopher Award" for feats in mentalism. In 1994, Glenn Falkenstein was inducted into The Society of American Magicians' Hall of Fame as a living legend.

He earned his master's degree from Pepperdine University and worked for years at the Los Angeles County Office of Education as a Speech Pathologist. The careers complimented the other, and he used his magic skills to aid young people overcoming speech defects.

He performed for President and Mrs. Ronald Reagan, at the inaugural dinner for President George W. Bush, and at Her Majesty's Theatre in London's West End. Falkenstein brought his ESP Act and Spirit Theatre to charitable organizations; along with magic colleagues David Copperfield and Lance Burton, Glenn helped Children's Village, USA raise enough funds to pay off its mortgage.

== Memorial ==
Falkenstein's memorial service was held on July 11, 2010, at the Palace of Mystery stage in the Magic Castle. The event included a broken wand ceremony and drew attendees such as family, friends, fans, and members of the William Larsen family, founders of the Magic Castle.
