= Miracle Mile Shops =

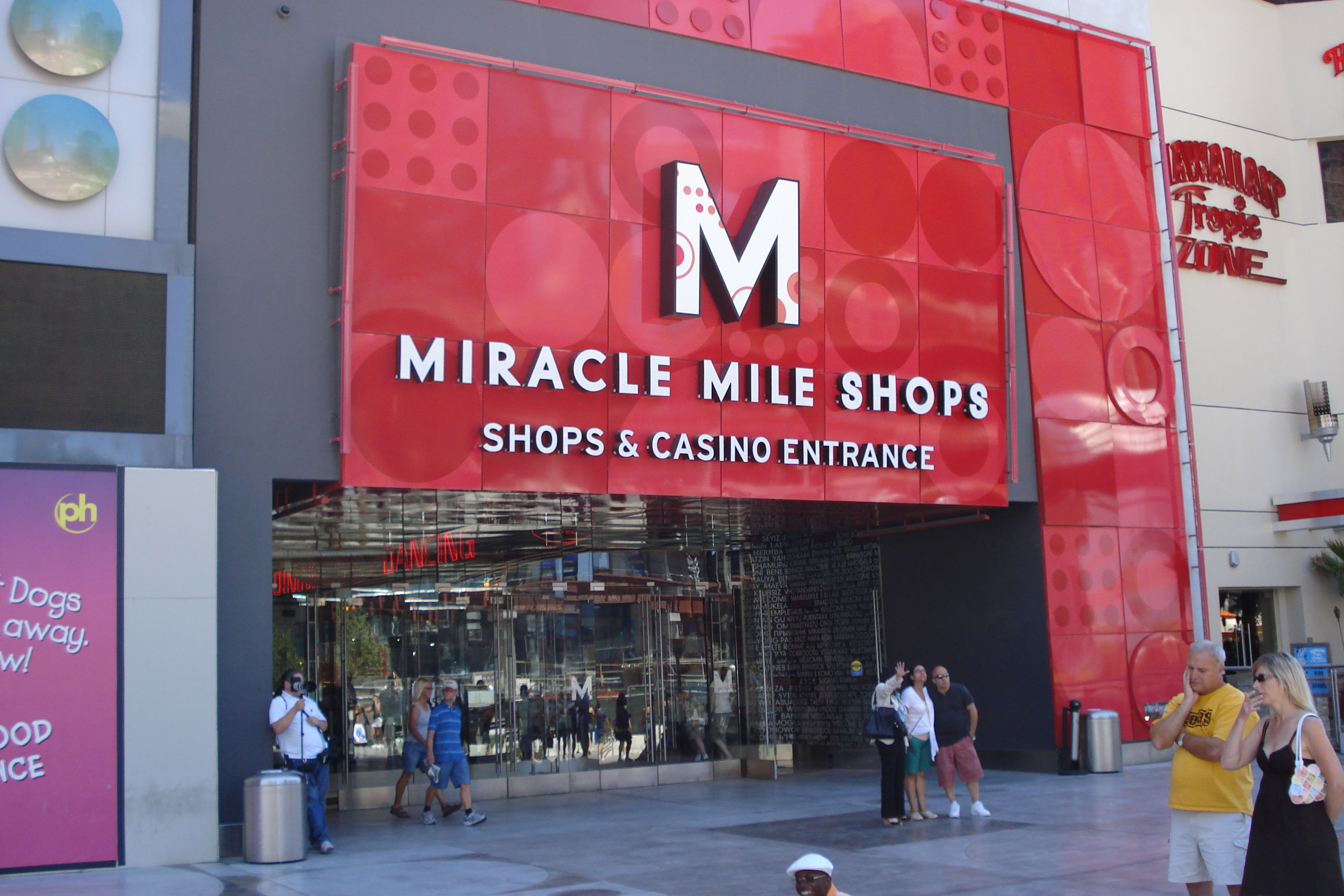
- Entrance on the Las Vegas Strip, 2009
- Location: Paradise, Nevada, U.S.
- Coordinates: 36°06′36″N 115°10′15.45″W
- Address: 3663 South Las Vegas Boulevard
- Opened: August 17, 2000; 26 years ago
- Developer: TrizecHahn
- Owner: Affiliate of Institutional Mall Investors LLC
- Num. of stores: 150+
- Floor area: 475,000 sq ft (44,100 m^{2})
- Floors: 1
- Website: miraclemileshopslv.com

Miracle Mile Shops (formerly The Shops in Desert Passage and Desert Passage) is an enclosed shopping mall adjacent to and connected with Planet Hollywood Las Vegas, located on the Las Vegas Strip in Paradise, Nevada. The mall is 475,000 sq ft (44,100 m^{2}) and 1.2-mile (1.9 km) long. It is home to more than 150 stores, along with restaurants and live entertainment venues.

The mall was created by TrizecHahn and real estate developer Jack Sommer. It opened as The Shops in Desert Passage on August 17, 2000, as a retail component of the Aladdin resort complex. Desert Passage initially struggled, as did the Aladdin. The mall was sold in 2003, and renovations began in 2006, in connection with the Aladdin's rebranding as Planet Hollywood. The mall was renamed Miracle Mile Shops in May 2007. It was sold in 2016 to an affiliate of Institutional Mall Investors LLC, a joint venture between Miller Capital Advisory and CalPERS.

== History ==
Miracle Mile Shops opened as The Shops in Desert Passage, a retail component of the rebuilt Aladdin resort on the Las Vegas Strip. Both the mall and resort featured an Arabian theme. Plans for Desert Passage were announced in March 1997. The mall was built at a cost of $290 million, and was designed to compete with the Forum Shops, also on the Strip. TrizecHahn owned two-thirds of the mall, while the Sommer Family Trust held the remaining interest. The trust, headed by real estate developer Jack Sommer, was also majority owner of the Aladdin.

Actress Barbara Eden, who portrayed a genie on the 1960s television series I Dream of Jeannie, appeared in character for the debut of Desert Passage, which opened on August 17, 2000. The mall expected to attract 50,000 visitors daily, but early revenue was poor. New stores were added in an effort to improve business. The mall's poor sales and foot traffic were linked in part to financial problems at the Aladdin, which filed for bankruptcy in 2001. Trizec believed that Desert Passage would rebound once the Aladdin emerged from bankruptcy. Some tenants accused management of poor advertising, failure to sign a major anchor tenant, and inflating visitor counts to justify lease rates. Trizec denied the allegations. Because of tenant vacancies, critics eventually nicknamed the mall "Deserted Passage".

In 2003, Planet Hollywood International announced plans to purchase the Aladdin and rebrand it as a Planet Hollywood resort. Desert Passage tenants were optimistic that the change would benefit the mall, and prospective buyers emerged soon after the announcement. New York developer David Edelstein and RFR Holding purchased Desert Passage in December 2003 for $240.5 million. They owned it through a joint venture known as Boulevard Invest, and Urban Retail Properties was hired to manage the mall.

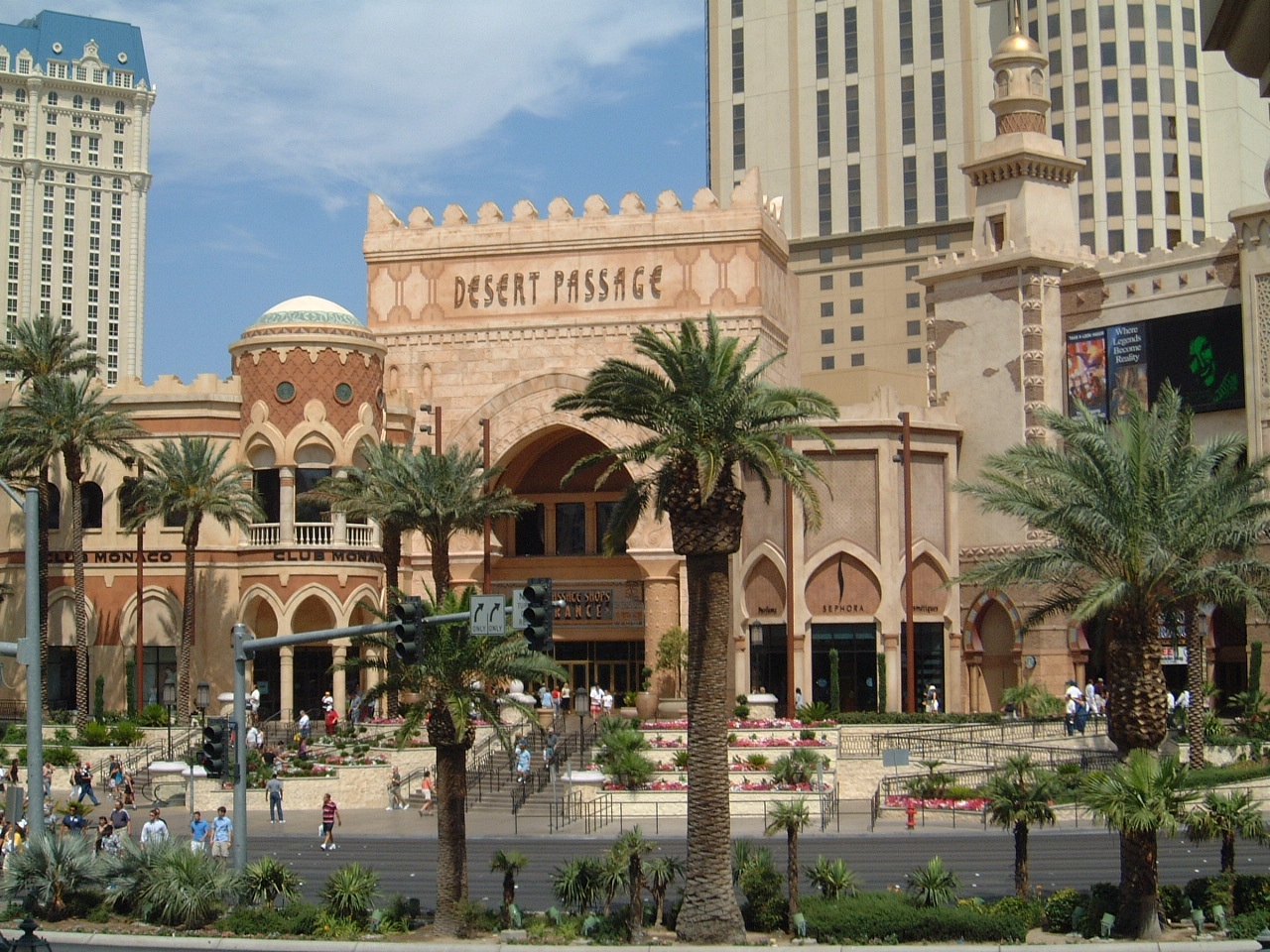
Desert Passage entrance along the Strip, 2003

Original logo

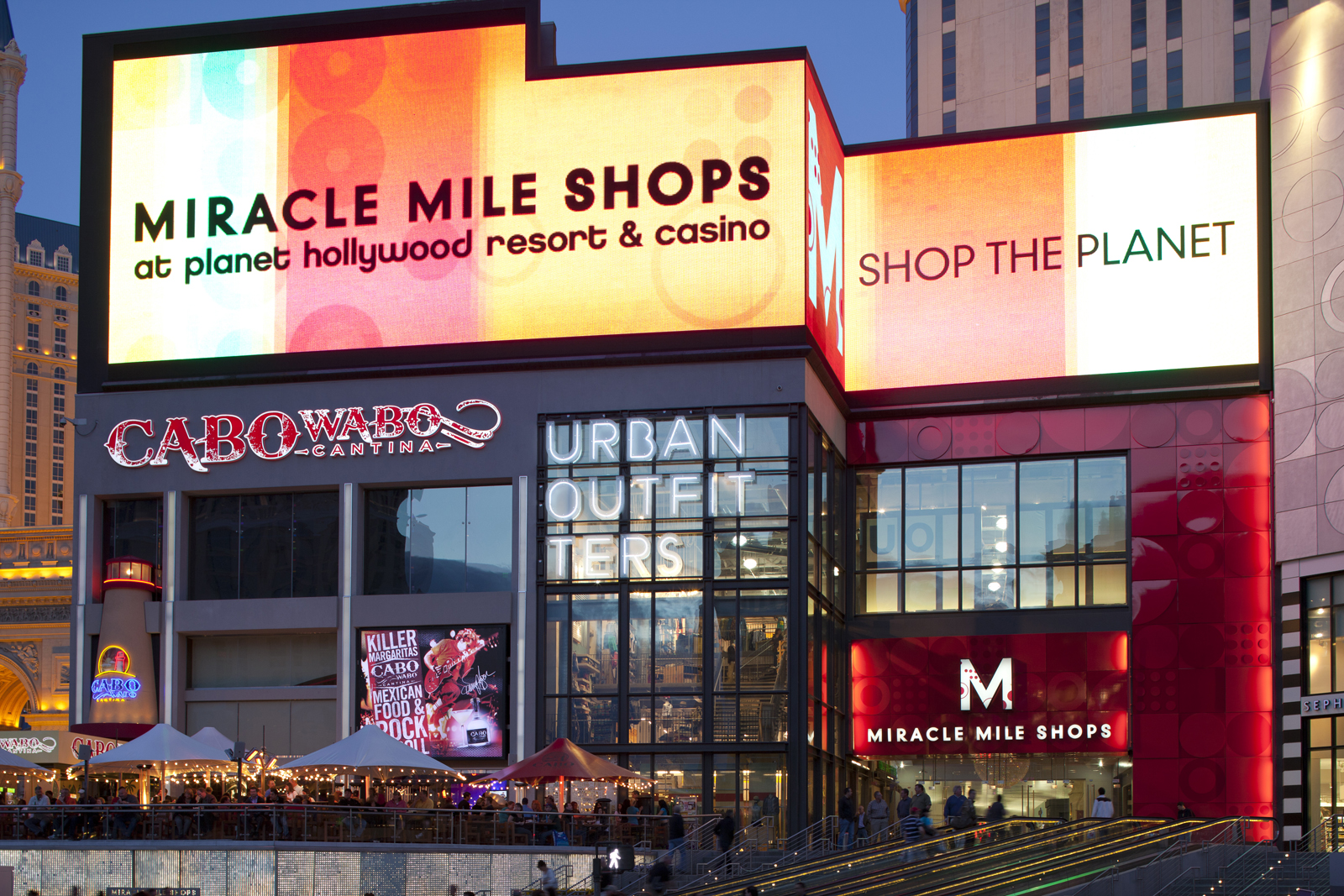
Miracle Mile Shops in 2011

Renovation work began in 2006, in connection with the Aladdin's rebranding as Planet Hollywood. The mall was renamed Miracle Mile Shops on May 1, 2007. Unlike its predecessor, Miracle Mile Shops sought to focus on affordability rather than high-end luxury. General manager Russell Joyner described the renovation, which cost over $60 million, as "Hollywood meets Times Square on the Vegas Strip." The renovated mall included a brighter design by Gensler. The project also included the removal of cobblestone flooring, which had been the subject of visitor complaints. Sales and foot traffic increased after the changes. As of 2009, the mall had annual visitation of 22 million, up from 15 million in 2004. Approximately 90 percent of visitors were tourists.

In 2016, Boulevard Invest sold the mall to an affiliate of Institutional Mall Investors LLC, a joint venture of Miller Capital Advisory and CalPERS. Planning for another renovation began in 2017, and work was set to begin in 2020, but the project was delayed by the COVID-19 pandemic. Work began in January 2022 and took place in phases, allowing the mall to remain open. The renovation included new flooring, lighting, ceilings, seating areas, a new sound system, upgraded light shows, and LED digital signage. More than 20,000 sq ft (1,900 m^{2}) of LED screens were added to the mall's exterior and interior. Portions of the original Desert Passage design were retained, including painted ceilings, Moroccan-style facades, and the Desert Passage ship facade. As of 2022, Miracle Mile Shops had 26 million visitors annually and had seen nearly 470 million visitors since its initial opening in 2000.

== Features ==
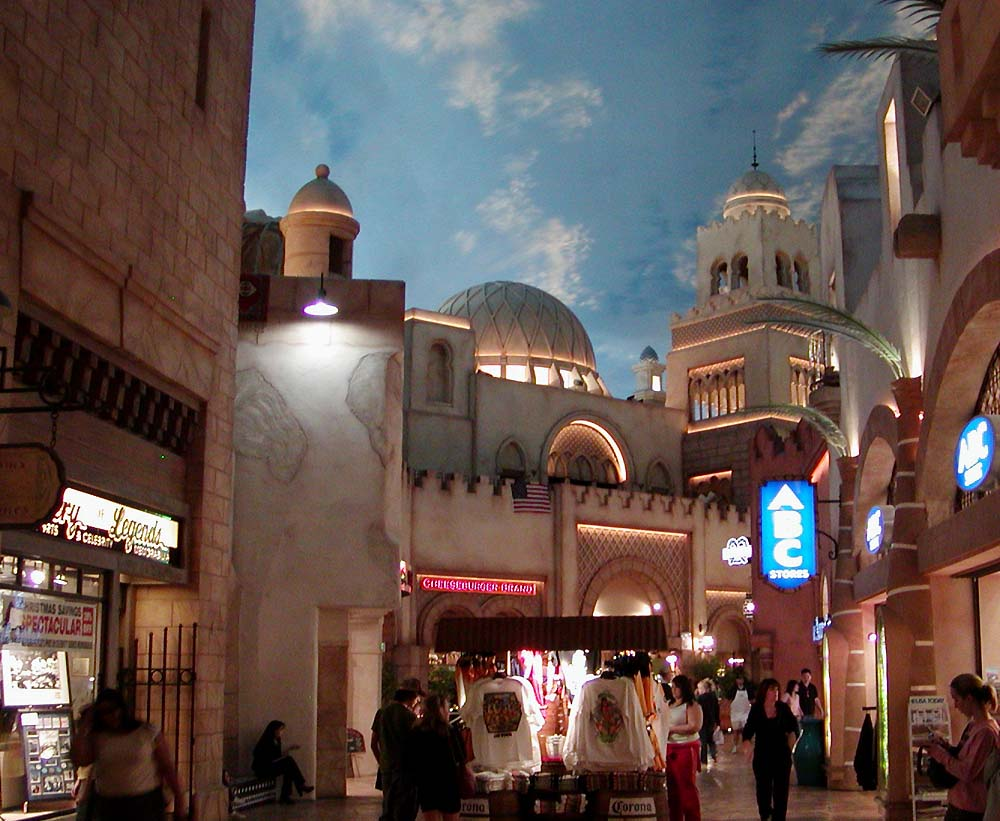
Desert Passage interior, 2004

The mall is laid out in a circular floor plan measuring 1.2 miles (1.9 km). It includes 475,000 sq ft (44,100 m^{2}) of space, and opened with 130 stores and 14 restaurants. Notable early retailers included Aveda, Clinique, Hugo Boss, Sephora, Tommy Bahama, and Z Gallerie. Desert Passage marked the Las Vegas debut for several tenants, including Build-A-Bear Workshop. As of 2023, the mall had 170 tenants.

Desert Passage was designed by RTKL Associates. Its original Arabian-themed design included sky-painted ceilings, more than 100 lamps custom-made in Morocco, and tenant restrictions on oversized display windows and prominent signage. Individualized storefronts were allowed after the mall transitioned into Miracle Mile Shops, although portions of the Arabian theme remain in place as of 2023.

Upon the mall's opening, restaurant and entertainment tenants included Commander's Palace, which originated in New Orleans, and a branch of New York's Blue Note Jazz Club, marking only the second U.S. location. The Blue Note venue seated 500 people and included the 150-seat Blue Note Cafe. The club operated until 2003, while Commander's Palace closed in 2007. Later notable tenants included Tipsy Robot, which opened in 2017 and features robot bartenders.

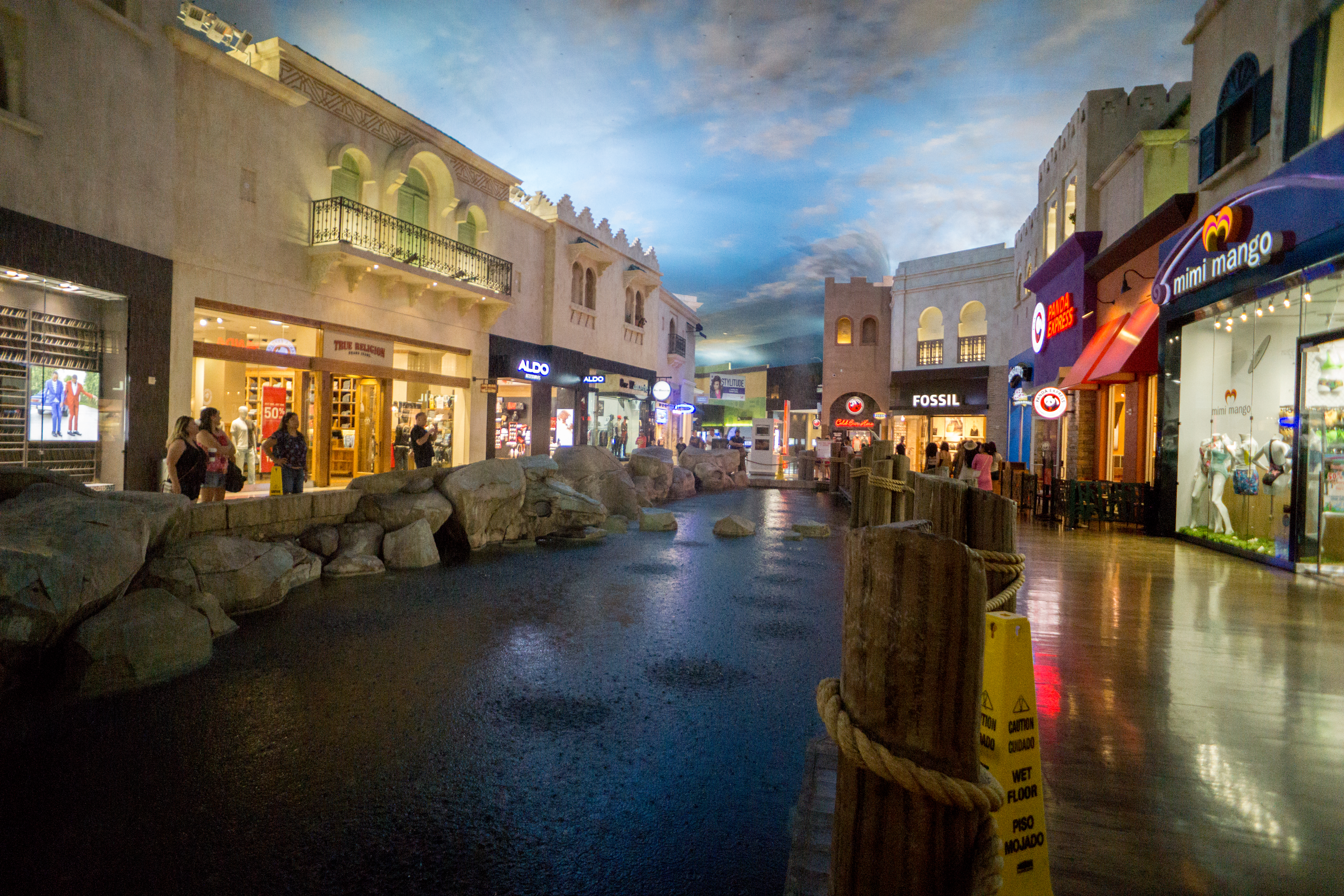
Indoor rain show, 2018

Desert Passage initially featured more than 30 performers who provided entertainment throughout the mall on a daily basis, including acrobats, a contortionist, musicians, and dancers. Since opening, the mall interior has also featured a faux freighter and a Rain Show. The Rain Show was updated as part of the 2023 renovation, and the mall also introduced the Lost City Show, a free 3D projection show located near the V Theater.

Desert Passage originally included the 15,000 sq ft (1,400 m^{2}) Alakazam Food Court, which closed in September 2002 because of poor business. The space was later converted into Sevilla, then the Ovation Theatre & Events Center, before producer David Saxe purchased it in 2004 and converted it into the V Theater and Event Center.

Magician Steve Wyrick opened a separate 500-seat theater in 2007. The Wyrick Theater closed in 2009, and Saxe took it over the following year, renaming it the Saxe Theater and operating it concurrently with the V Theater.

Miracle Eats, a food court near the mall's south entrance, opened in phases beginning in 2025. Its tenants include Chipotle Mexican Grill, Tacotarian, Fat Tuesday, Carnegie Pizza, Lobster ME, Irv's Burgers, SoulBelly BBQ, and Dave's Hot Chicken.
