= Singh Kaur =

- Also known as: Lorellei
- Born: Laura Drew; 1955
- Died: 1998 (aged 42–43) Maui, Hawaii
- Genres: New-age
- Occupations: Composer, vocalist, instrumentalist
- Instrument: Guitar
- Years active: 1978–1998
- Labels: Invincible Records, Soundings of the Planet, Sequoia Records
- Formerly of: Kim Robertson, Dean Evenson, Gary Stadler
- Website: soundings.com/pages/singh-kaur-lorellei

Laura Drew, a.k.a. Singh Kaur or Lorellei (1955–1998) was an American new-age music composer, vocalist and instrumentalist, who had a prolific career that lasted from the early 1970s to the late 1990s, releasing 23 albums. With her angelic voice and haunting melodies, Singh Kaur was a pioneer in the growing genre of Western interpretations of Indian chanting music.

== Personal life ==
Singh Kaur initially lived at the Tucson ashram, and it was there she began to flower as a musician. Although she had arrived with 'St. Francis' already complete, she was exposed to the eclectic musicians of the 3HO community and a new, spiritually-focused, way of living.

She later moved to the Española, New Mexico 3HO community, where her musical talents expanded and she found her footing as a composer and singer of inspiring devotional songs. There, she met, and later married, Gurucharan Singh. Not long after their marriage, they moved to Denver to open a health food restaurant. From there, they moved to St. Louis for the purpose of opening a yoga ashram. During their years in St. Louis, Gurucharan and Singh Kaur had two children, Guru Shabd and Guru Ardas.

== Music ==
In the early years of her musical life, Singh Kaur collaborated with the yogi musicians of 3HO. Yogi Bhajan, her spiritual guide, commissioned Singh Kaur to record a series of eight mantras, six of which she was able to complete. These were to be the highly popular Crimson Series on Invincible Records, with Kim Robertson (harp, synthesizer), and produced by Liv Singh Khalsa. These recordings remain Singh Kaur's most popular, and are frequently played in hospitals, birthing centers, holistic spas, and other sites where healing music is helpful.

At one point in her musical journey Singh Kaur collaborated with Amar Singh Khalsa. He recounted her effortless creativity: "We were sitting in the St. Louis airport with Yogi Bhajan, who was waiting for a connecting flight to New York City. He asked Singh Kaur to put Rakhe Rakhan Har (a Sikh verse) to music. I was sitting next to her as Yogi Bhajan tapped out the heartbeat rhythm on an empty Styrofoam cup. I wrote the rhythm down, and when we got home, we put the rhythm into Singh Kaur's drum machine. This is the beat heard on the final recording. The next day I went off to work. When I came home that evening, I asked Singh Kaur about it, and she played a rough recording – basically the finished piece. She had sat down in the morning and the music just flowed through her. I was always amazed and awed by her ability to put the perfect music to any words that came her way – English or Gurmukhi." Amar Singh Khalsa and his wife, Sahib-Amar Khalsa, continued to maintain a friendship with Singh Kaur and played keyboards and viola, respectively, on subsequent recordings.

Singh Kaur's biggest commercial success was her album "Instruments of Peace" (later retitled "Imagine Peace") which made the Billboard New Age Music listing in 1988. This album was produced during Singh Kaur's long-time association with Dean and Dudley Evenson, with whom she stayed and toured over a two-year period. She released two other CDs on the Evenson's 'Soundings of the Planet' label: "What Child Is This", and "Spiritus: Breath of Life" (recorded under the name of Lorellei which she co-produced with Dean Evenson). It was with the album "Spiritus" that she poured out her heart, writing songs in English (rather than the mantras of her previous ashram life).

== Later years ==
Owing to an increasingly stressful home life, Singh Kaur left her husband and children in the late 1980s; and this crisis impacted on her state of health and the quality of her work. Singer Wah was called in to double the vocal track on Blessings, the seventh recording in the Crimson Series. However, Singh Kaur soon regained her voice — although her health was beginning to decline — and continued to make recordings. It was after she left St. Louis and moved back to Tucson that she met Dean and Dudley Evenson of Soundings of the Planet, who befriended her and who subsequently produced 3 albums with her.

In the early 1990s, after listening to some Joni Mitchell recordings, Singh Kaur contacted her former producer, Liv Singh Khalsa of Invincible Music. She wanted to do another recording, and 'Wings of Love' was recorded in Phoenix, Arizona, at the Invincible studios.

Responding to the invitation of a friend, Singh Kaur moved to Maui, Hawaii. Although she never ceased being a Sikh, she abandoned the turban, and took to wearing conventional clothing. She continued to write songs, sang in a rock band, and began to enjoy her new freedom. It was during this period that she met her future husband, Keith Drew. He knew nothing of her musical past or talents, but saw her as a feisty and gorgeous redhead. While on Maui, Singh Kaur met a kindred musical spirit, Jaiia Earthschild, and they co-created, and recorded, many songs, which remain in Earthschild's personal collection.

Singh Kaur returned to the U.S. mainland in 1998, ill with ovarian cancer, to work with Gary Stadler on "Fairy NightSongs".

Singh Kaur also recorded the tracks for "This Universe", which was released posthumously. She gave two farewell performances, one on Maui Island with her children, Guru Shabd and Guru Ardas Khalsa present, and one at the 3HO Ashram in Los Angeles. Before she returned to Hawaii, she gave her beloved Guild 12-string guitar and personal cassette and CD collection to Gary Stadler. Due to her illness, she relocated to Caroline Graham Muir's house as it was more easily accessible than the 3-story house that she and Keith shared.

Despite her illness, she recorded several vocal tracks for Daniel Paul (tabla musician); she would get out of bed long enough to sing, and then lay down again. Upon her death she was dressed in her favorite green velvet dress. Later, after her cremation, her friends chartered a boat; and, with "Guru Ram Das" playing over the boat's sound system, her ashes were cast into the sea.

== Discography ==
- Songs of the Lord's Love, (Invincible Music, 1978) with Sat Nam Singh
- Sukhmani, Ashtpadi 6 (1979)
- Peace Lagoon (1979)
- Peace Lagoon II (1983) with Sahib-Amar Kaur Khalsa and Amar Singh Khalsa
- Joyful Vision (1983)
- Mera Man Lochai (1985)
- Aap Sahaee Hoaa (1986) with Amar Singh Khalsa
- Sadhana Suite (1986) with Amar Singh Khalsa
- Rakhe Rakhanhar (1986)
- Guru Ram Dass, Crimson Series 1 (Invincible Music, 1986) with Kim Robertson
- Mool Mantra, Crimson Series 2 (Invincible Music, 1986) with Kim Robertson
- Sat Nam Wahe Guru, Crimson Series 3 (Invincible Music, 1987) with Kim Robertson
- Har Har Mukande, Crimson Series 4 (Invincible Music 1988) with Kim Robertson
- Mender of Hearts, Crimson Series 5 (Invincible Music 1988) with Kim Robertson
- Imagine Peace, (Soundings of the Planet, 1988) with Dean Evenson (inspired by famous John Lennon's song, "Imagine")
- Ardas, Crimson Series 6 (Invincible Music 1989) with Kim Robertson
- Blessings, Crimson Series 7 (Invincible Music 1990) with Wah
- Wings of Love (Invincible Music, 1992)
- What Child is This (Soundings of the Planet, 1993) with Dean Evenson
- Spiritus: Breath of Life (Soundings of the Planet, 1996) recorded as "Lorellei"
- Fairy NightSongs (Sequoia Records, 1998) with Gary Stadler, Sahib-Amar Kaur Khalsa
- This Universe (released posthumously by Sequoia Records, 2005) with Gary Stadler
- Remember Him (released posthumously by Invincible Music 2017) with Amar Singh Khalsa

== Sources ==
- "Interview", Beads of Truth Magazine, II:17, Summer 1986, pp. 24–25.
- Gurudass Singh, "A Joyful Noise: Gurudass Singh explores 35 years of music in 3HO", Aquarian Times Magazine, 4:4, Winter 2005, pp. 66–71.
- Sat Kartar Kaur Khalsa, "Remembering Singh Kaur", Aquarian Times Magazine, 4:4, Winter 2005, p . 72.
- Gurubanda Singh Khalsa, "Music: The Companion that Soothes Us and Moves Us", The Man Called Siri Singh Sahib, eds. Sardarni Premka Kaur Khalsa, Sat Kirpal Kaur Khalsa, Los Angeles, Sikh Dharma, 1979, pp. 306–11.
