= The World's Most Dangerous Magic =

- Country of origin: United States
- Original language: English
- No. of episodes: 2

Production
- Running time: 60 minutes
- Production company: NBC Studios

Original release
- Network: NBC
- Release: 27 April 1998 – 2 May 1999

The World's Most Dangerous Magic was the title of two American television specials showcasing illusion and escapology acts, which were made for the NBC network. The first was originally broadcast on 27 April 1998 and the second, titled The World's Most Dangerous Magic 2, was initially aired on 2 May 1999.

The shows were the brainchild of producer Gary Ouellet and were made by the Gary L Pudney Company. They featured a combination of famous performers and lesser-known magicians, each performing stunts or illusions that were claimed to involve the risk of death or serious injury. While some stunts clearly involved genuine life-threatening danger should anything have gone wrong, the risk of injury in others was open to question. In the first show, The Pendragons performed the illusion Impaled, which was described as a "balancing feat" in which Charlotte Pendragon risked fatal impalement should it go wrong. However this is a well known illusion in the general repertoire of stage magic in which the performer is not actually in danger of genuine impalement (although if performed clumsily or with poor quality apparatus there is some risk of back injury to the assistant). The Pendragons' presentation of this illusion is nevertheless rated by many magicians as possibly the best ever version of the trick.

== Tricks and performers ==
=== The World's Most Dangerous Magic ===
- "Sixty Seconds to Live" - magician Robert Gallup performed an escape while suspended upside down from three burning ropes.
- "Scorpion Production" - Robert Gallup.
- "Viper Pit" - Melinda Saxe was shackled to the bottom of a glass tank which was then filled with snakes. She escaped using levitation.
- "Sword Basket" - Charlotte Pendragon got into a wicker basket and her husband Jonathon thrust several burning spears through it. The voice-over stated that Charlotte had suffered burns during a previous attempt at the stunt.
- "Wolf Trap" - Robert Gallup put his hand into a metal toothed animal trap.
- "Table of Terror" - Mark Kalin performed the Table of Death trick.
- "Impaled" - Jonathon Pendragon balanced his wife Charlotte on the point of a sword and she then appeared to be impaled by it.
- "Jagged Edge" - Gary Kurtz played a form of Russian roulette using knives.
- "Death at Hoover Dam" - Escape artist Dean Gunnarson freed himself from a straitjacket while suspended upside down 726 feet above the ground from the Hoover Dam.

=== The World's Most Dangerous Magic II ===
- Michael Grandinetti - escaped from between two walls of steel spikes which were lit on fire and set to spring inwards at over 50 mph
- Dean Gunnarson-Gunnarson escaped suspended upside down hanging from a trapeze bar over a swamp of 130 hungry alligators in the Florida everglades covered in chicken meat and blood.
- Steve Wyrick - Walked through the spinning blades of a jet turbine engine.
- Tony Clark - Was chained to the side of a semi-truck filled with explosives and had to escape before a station wagon, which had no brakes, ran him over at 60 mph.
- Anthony Reed - performed a version of the Aquarian Illusion.
- Gary Kurtz - Played a deadly game of roulette with four jars, three of which contained rabbits, and one of which contained a monocled cobra.
- Margo - was shackled inside a coffin which was then filled with over 120 rats.

=== Music ===
Both specials were scored primarily using production music from the Atmosphere, Kosinus and Opus 1 libraries, and supplemented by material from Gary Ouellet's 'Designer Textures for Magicians'.

The following tracks were used:

- Main Titles: 'The Deep' (Atmosphere music)
- Anthony Reed: 'Midnight Sun' and 'Destructor' (Kosinus), 'Menace' (Gary Ouellet's Designer Textures for Magicians)
- Hoover Dam: 'Steel', 'Piano Steps', 'Brutal' and 'Anticipation' (Atmosphere music), 'Dangerdrone' and 'Ghost Caverns' (Gary Ouellet's Designer Textures for Magicians)
- The Pendragons: 'Out to Lunch', 'Haunted' (Atmosphere music), 'Challenger', 'Dangerzone', 'Grungesurfin' (Match music)
- Melinda (Snakes): 'Volcano March', 'Tribal Danger' and 'Threat Basic' (Atmosphere music)
- Mark Kalin: 'Death Toll', 'Savages' (Atmosphere music) and 'Grunge Grove' (Kosinus music)
- Michael Grandinetti: 'Dark Child', 'Seance' (Opus 1) and 'O Sanctum et Beatissimum Virum' (Anno Domini, 1997)
- Margo: 'Desolation', 'Night Killer' and 'Mystic Party' (Kosinus music)
- Gary Kurtz: 'Traces of Fear', 'Volcano March', 'Piano Steps' (Atmosphere music), 'Grunge Grove' (Kosinus music), 'Tribal Ghost' (Opus 1) and 'Titanic Drone' (Moments Music)
- Robert Gallup: 'Money Train', 'New Order', 'Action Adventure', 'Horror Dawning' (Atmosphere music) and 'Impending Doom' and 'Thunderdrums' (Gary Ouellet's Designer Textures for Magicians)
- Steve Wyrick: 'The Haunting (Opus 1) and 'Verminator' (Kosinus music)
- Dean Gunnarson 'Gaitor Bait': 'No Survivor', 'Heroes' (Kosinus music) and 'Mechanogenesis', 'Mechanized Execution' and 'Chaos Control' (Opus 1).
