= Christian Farla =

Dutch magician (born 1970)

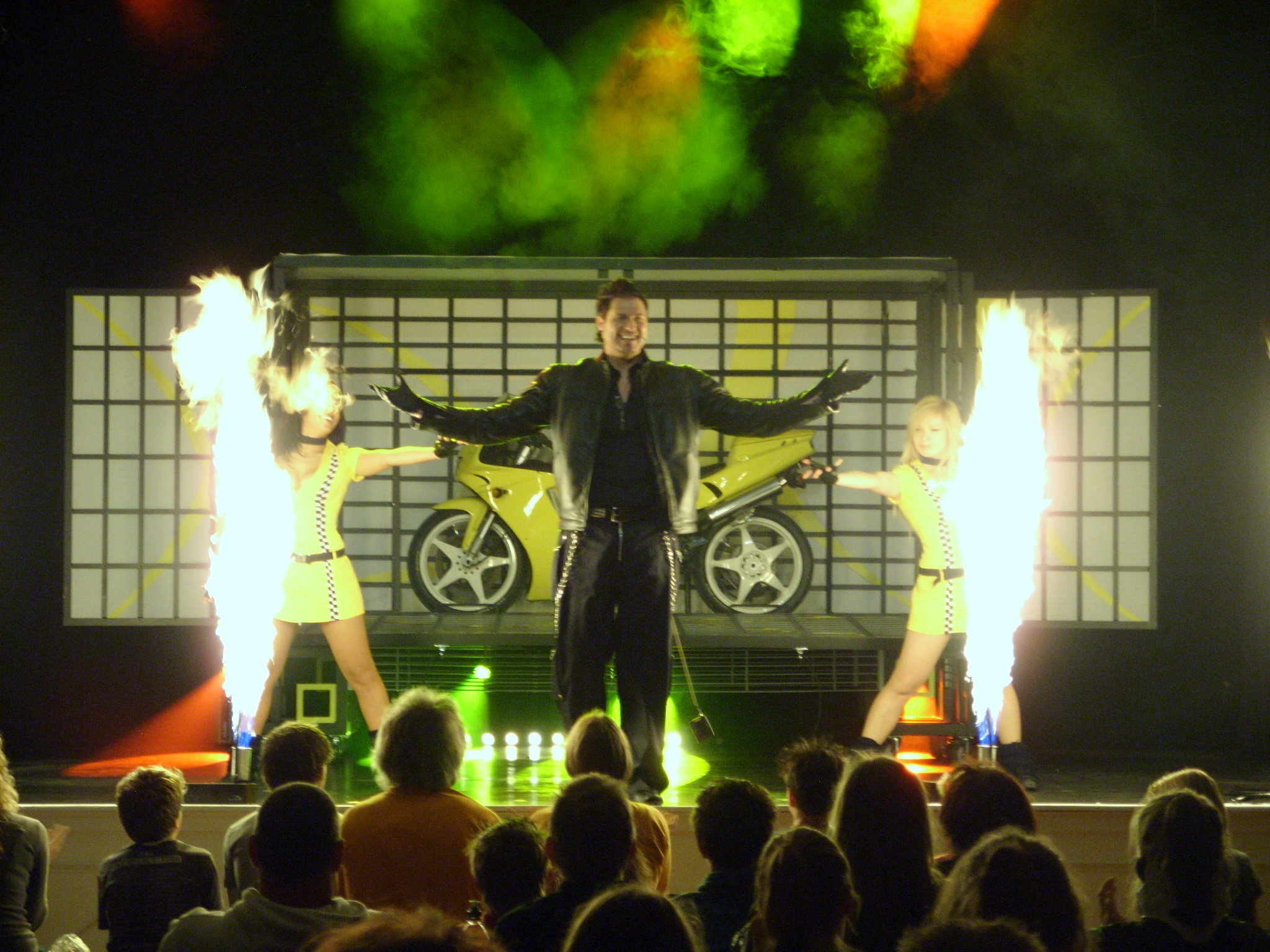
Christian Farla

Christian Farla (born May 5, 1970, in Rotterdam) is a Dutch magician from Rotterdam who specializes in illusions. In 2006 and 2009, he won the Merlin Award.

== Biography ==
Christian was born in Rotterdam on May 5, 1970. He won the Dutch Junior Championships for Stage Magic aged 12 and decided to become an illusionist. During school holidays, he traveled with the circus and learned about performing for large audiences. In 1992, he met his future partner and magic assistant, Bianca, who was performing as a dancer in the same show he was performing in. On August 19, 2008, their son was born.

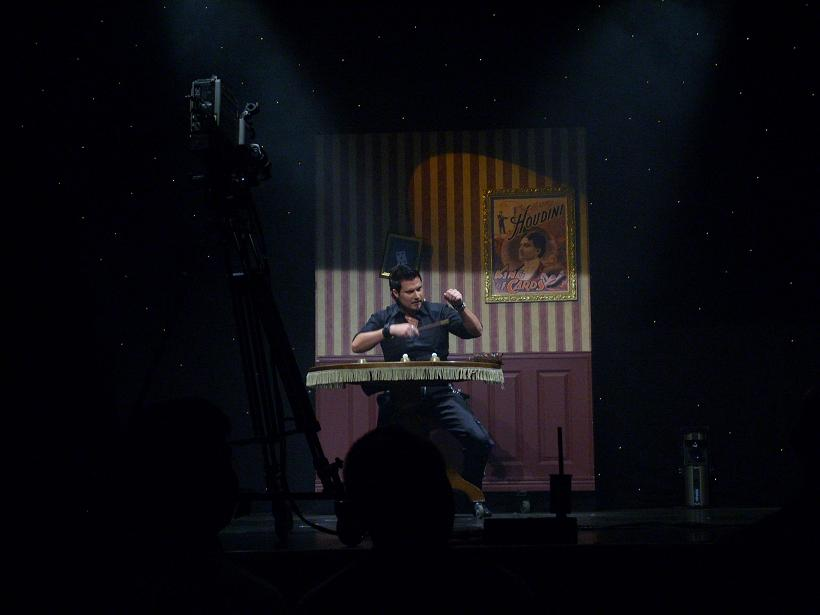
Christian Farla

In 1993, 1999, and 2001, the magic duo won the first prize in the Dutch Magic Championships. In 1996 they got their first big contract with Vd Ende Events to perform in many large productions in the Studios in Aalsmeer. After winning the Henk Vermeyden Trophy, Farla got a contract for 80 shows for the Sunflower Foundation Tour. They got spotted by Frank Wentink who offered them a place in the grand scale Dinner show in Hilversum. When Hans Klok left the Amazing Efteling Show in the amusement park The Efteling, Farla took over his part in the show. New illusions were created and he won the award for Best Show in an Amusement Park Worldwide in 2003.

After more than 2000 shows in Studio 21 and The Efteling in 2003 and 2004, the duo was invited for a couple of shows in Las Vegas by Siegfried and Roy. This resulted in the exchange of magic acts like the Drill of Death and Steel plate, where one of Farla's assistants seems to be floating through a plate of steel.

Farla started his first tour in 2006 with a 2-hour illusion show in Holland 2006. The International Magicians Society awarded this with the Merlin Award, for the magician of the year. He also received the Champion d’Europe de Magie in Lido Paris in 2007. After three years performing during summer holidays in the amusement park Drievliet, he switched to the larger Walibi World Themepark in 2009. There, Farla received the Merlin Award for the second time in April 2009.

Christian auditioned for the eighth series of Britain's Got Talent

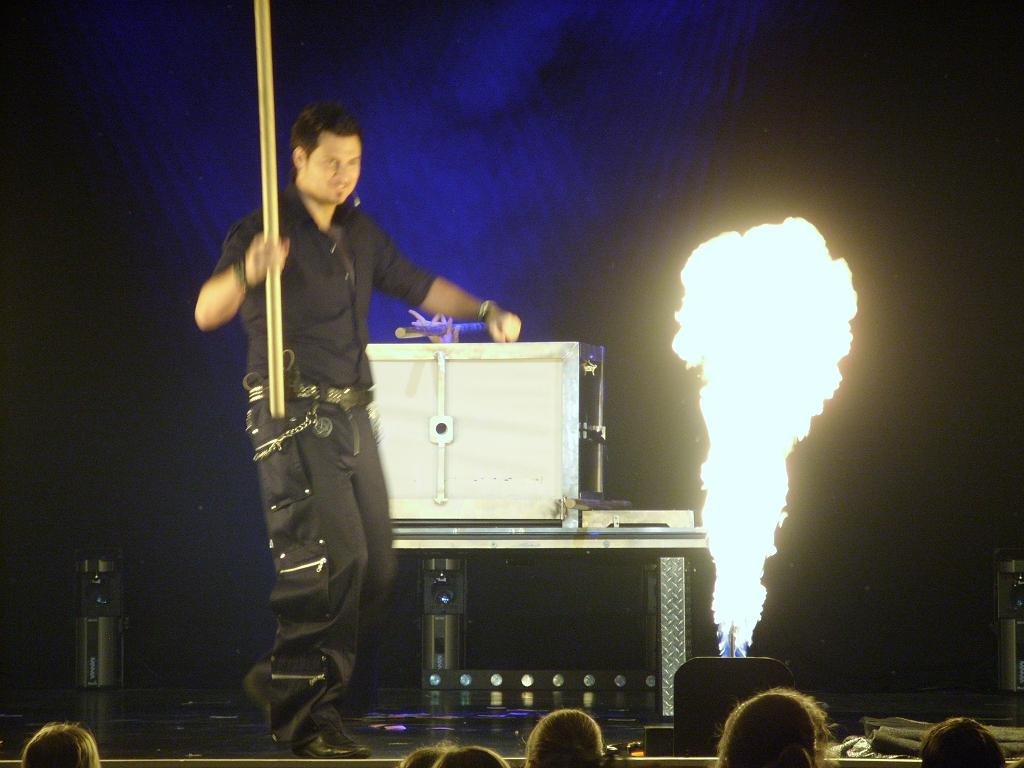
Christian Farla

== Awards ==
- 2006 'Merlin-award for Magician of the year'
- 2007 'Champion de Europe de Magie' in Paris
- 2008 'Mandrake O Dor Award'
- 2009 'Merlin-award for Magic Show of the Year 2009'

== See also ==
- Magic (illusion)
- Illusionists
