= David Saxe =

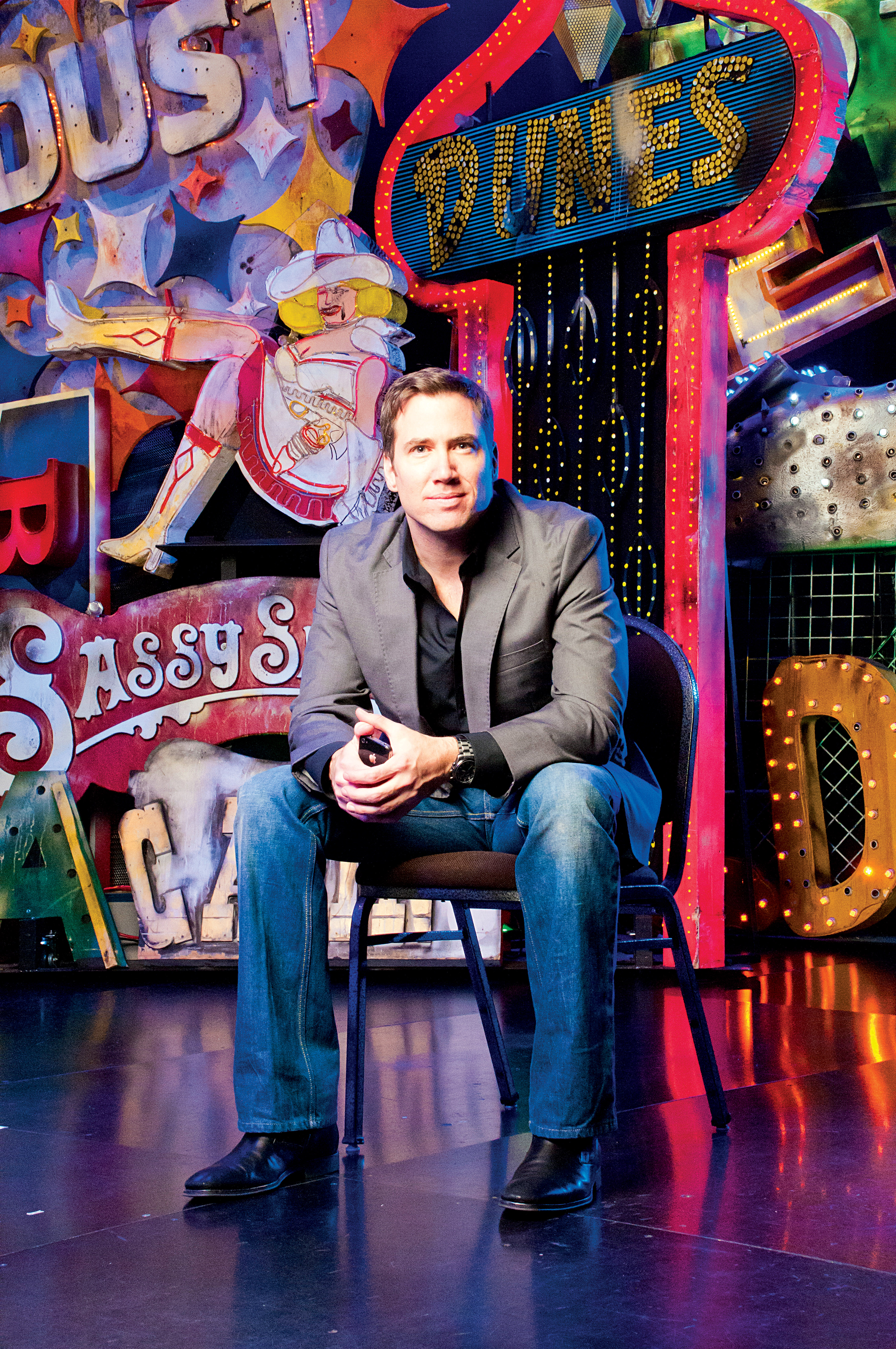
- Saxe in 2012
- Born: August 29, 1969; Las Vegas Valley, Nevada, United States
- Education: University of Nevada, Las Vegas
- Occupations: Producer; theater owner
- Relatives: Melinda Saxe (sister)
- Website: davidsaxe.com

David Saxe (born August 29, 1969) is a Las Vegas-born show producer and theater owner. He is the owner of both the V Theater and the Saxe Theater.

== Early life and education ==
Saxe was born on August 29, 1969, in Las Vegas, Nevada. His mother was a dancer at the Folies Bergère, and his father was a saxophone player and bandleader for The Rat Pack. Saxe holds a bachelor's degree in communications from the University of Nevada, Las Vegas.

== Career ==
At the age of 17, Saxe produced his sister's TV special: Melinda Saxe – First Lady of Magic. Filmed at Bourbon Street Hotel and Casino, the show made him the youngest producer in Las Vegas history. The show was a success, and Melinda became a household name after appearing on The Oprah Winfrey Show and The Tonight Show with Jay Leno.

Saxe opened his first theater in San Francisco, and had produced 25 shows by the age of 30. In 2004, Saxe opened the V Theater in Las Vegas. In the same year, he produced V - The Ultimate Variety Show, which is still in production today. In 2010, Saxe acquired a second theater: the Saxe Theater. Saxe Theater opened with its first production, VEGAS! THE SHOW, and is now home to BeatleShow! and Nathan Burton Comedy Magic. Both theatres are located in Miracle Mile Shops shopping center.

== Honors ==
- Honored at the third annual University of Nevada, Las Vegas, Vallen Dinner of Distinction as an "Industry Notable".
- Listed in the In Business Las Vegas magazine's "Top 40 Under 40"
