= Zingaia =

American new-age music group

Zingaia is an American musical group in the genres of contemporary world music, new-age music and Ethnic electronica. They have released three albums and have appeared on six compilations, including the Billboard charting album Buddha-Lounge 3.

Their music includes multi-cultural instrumentation, vocals, hand-drums and other percussion. Popular themes are mythology, Neopaganism, Goddesses, Shamanism, and trance-dance. They are based in Las Vegas, Nevada. Author Oberon Zell-Ravenheart describes Zingaia's music as "techno-tantra-trance music dedicated to sacred lovers and to the Goddess in all Her many aspects."

== Background ==
Zingaia is the project of husband and wife team, Michael and Katlyn Breene, that they started in the early 1990s. Michael creates the music in his studio, often in collaboration with other musicians and singers. Katlyn creates the album covers and writes most of the lyrics. Pianist and keyboard player by trade, Michael’s career includes a wide variety of musical styles and influences. His roots are as a jazz pianist (he toured with the legendary Sarah Vaughan and jazz greats Freddie Hubbard and Jon Hendricks), and later played in rock, funk and country groups, as well as large orchestras. Katlyn created the art for album covers for several other recording artists as well, including Sophia, EverStar, and Gary Stadler, whose wife Tamara Stadler wrote lyrics for several Zingaia songs.

According to the liner notes on Zingaia's 2000 release, Dancers of Twilight, lead vocals are performed by Abbi Spinner, who co-wrote the lyrics with Katlyn Breene. Abbi Spinner's husband and partner, stage magician Jeff McBride, founder of the McBride Magic & Mystery School, is credited for "special guest vocal" on one of the songs.

Zingaia’s 2004 release, Soles on Earth, was co-produced by Michael Breene with David and Steve Gordon, founders of Sequoia Records. The album received the Coalition of Visionary Retailers’ Best World Album of the Year award in 2005.

Zingaia’s music was featured in the 2004 Australian film Dances of Ecstasy, produced by Luna Pictures, and in the January 2006 television documentary A Magickal Life: Jeff McBride, produced and broadcast by Canada's VisionTV as part of their series Enigma True-Life Stories.

== Discography ==
=== Full length recordings by Zingaia ===
- Sundari (2016, Sequoia Records)
- Earth Church (2012, Sequoia Records)
- Soles on Earth (2004, Sequoia Records)
- Dancers of Twilight (2000, Sequoia Records)
- Beneath the Veil (1996, Sequoia Records)

=== Compilations including recordings by Zingaia ===
- Hotel Tara - The Intimate Side of Buddha-Lounge (2005, Sequoia Records)
- Diani Beach Lounge (2004, Prudence Recordings)
- Buddha-Lounge 3 (2004, Sequoia Records)
- Cafe de Luna 2 (2004, Sequoia Records)
- Ayurveda Lounge (2002, BSC Music GmbH)
- Buddha-Lounge (2002, Sequoia Records)
- Musical Healing (2001, Sequoia Records)
