= The World's Greatest Magic =

US miniseries

The World's Greatest Magic was a series of American television specials showcasing magic acts. The first of five shows was broadcast by NBC in 1994, and continued with annual editions through 1998. These shows were most often first telecast during the Thanksgiving holidays when special programming would occur. These specials reran occasionally on ABC Family (then The Family Channel and Fox Family) from October 1996 to early 2002.

The first episode was hosted by Robert Urich, the second by Alan Thicke, and the final three episodes by John Ritter. All of the specials were narrated by Don LaFontaine. During specials II, III, IV, and V, before each commercial break of every episode, in a segment known as the Mac King School of Magic, Mac King showed viewers a simple magic trick, and would break its steps down after the commercial break so that the audience could perform the same trick for family and friends. The first special featured the same teach-a-trick segments which involved some of the various magicians featured in the special, along with a special guest celebrity.

Below is a list of the closing illusions for each of the five shows, and the magicians who performed them:

- World's Greatest Magic I: Franz Harary - Space Shuttle vanish
- World's Greatest Magic II: Penn and Teller - Magic bullet catch
- World's Greatest Magic III: The Pendragons - Disappearance of 25 Vegas showgirls
- World's Greatest Magic IV: Lance Burton - Jaws of Death escape (Lance was handcuffed and shackled inside a canvas mailbag, put in the back of a car, and dropped into a car crusher.)
- World's Greatest Magic V: Brett Daniels - Teleportation of actress Kelly Packard across the Grand Canyon

== Featured magicians ==
- The Amazing Johnathan
- Anand Joshi
- Ayala & Lilia
- Bill Malone
- Bob Arno
- Brett Daniels
- David Williamson
- Fielding West
- Franz Harary
- Galina
- Greg Frewin
- The Hamners
- Hans Klok & Sittah
- Jean-Pierre Vallarino
- Jeff Hobson
- Jeff McBride
- Joseph Gabriel
- Juan Tamariz
- Juliana Chen
- Lance Burton
- Mac King
- Magician Ganesh
- Mark Kalin and Jinger(Kalin)
- Max Maven
- Melinda Saxe (a.k.a. "Melinda, First Lady of Magic")
- Nathan Burton
- Penn and Teller
- Peter Marvey
- Princess Tenko
- Raymond Crowe
- Rene Lavand
- Sheri Lucas
- Steve Wyrick
- Francis Tabary
- Tom Mullica
- Topas
- Ken Mate

== Music ==
The producer of this series, Gary Ouellet, released a booklet entitled 'Music for Magicians', in which the music selection and editing process for this show was explained.

Few of the performers could use their regular performance music, because synchronization rights are usually too costly (or sometimes unavailable) for commercial tracks. Two exceptions were Topas from WGM I, who used 'Hello Again' by the Cars, and Jeff McBride, who had music specially written for him by Jordan Rudess.

Hence, for the first two specials, the performers taped the show using their normal music, and a new audio track had to be created for broadcast, consisting of custom music created for each performer (which resembled their existing music), and a re-creation of the audience applause. In some cases, it was known that the ambient sounds/applause would be important to a particular performer, and those acts were performed without music, so that custom music could be cleanly inserted in post-production.

Prior to making WGM III, Ouellet had to use production music as a last-minute scoring option on another magic production, and subsequently he decided to make WGM III entirely using production music, for which he searched through 15,000 'cuts'. Each performer's music track was specially created from at least one (often several) library track, with stingers, hits and various accentuating effects from Gary Ouellet's Designer Textures for Magicians. Hence, WGM 3-5 were taped live with the pre-prepared music tracks.

The following tracks have been identified as being used within the noted performers' sets:

World's Greatest Magic III

- 'Damned' from Kosinus (Brett Daniels - Appearing Car)
- 'Shock Troops' and 'Car Wash' from Kosinus (Hans Klok)
- 'Pure Silk' from JW Media Music and 'Angel Wave' from Kosinus (Galina)
- 'Tabasco Road' & 'Angel Eyes' from Koka, and 'Funky Lady' from Opus 1 (Peter Marvey)
- 'Mystic Party' from Kosinus, and 'Requiem, Op. 89, B. 165:III. Dies irae' by Dvorak (Joseph Gabriel)
- 'Techno Pursuit' from Opus 1 (Brett Daniels - Sawing in half)
- 'Loco' and 'Words on the Beat' from Koka (Nathan Burton)
- 'Starlight' and 'Hi Hop' from Koka (Greg Frewin)
- 'New Opus' from Koka (Jean Pierre Vallarino)
- 'Kabaret' from Koka (Mac King)
- 'Katanga' from Kosinus and 'Pressure Point' from JW Media Music (Dirk Arthur)
- 'It's Hollywood', 'Industrial' and 'Final Result' from Opus 1 (The Pendragons - Vanishing Showgirls)

World's Greatest Magic IV

- 'Real City' from FirstCom (Opening titles and transition segments)
- 'Gothic City', 'Enemy Hits' and 'Double Threat' from FirstCom (Ayala - opening illusion)
- 'Gun Play' and 'The Getaway' from Hollywood Music (Jonathan David Bass)
- 'Facing Saigon' and 'Bamboo Sea' from FirstCom and 'Stormrider' from Chappell (Juliana Chen)
- 'Top League' from Chappell (Tim Cole & Jenny Lynn)
- 'Closer To My Love' from Chappell (Rick Thomas)
- 'X Generation' from FirstCom (Sherry Lukas)
- 'Cyclone' and 'Bravado' from FirstCom (The Hamners)
- 'Small Town' from FirstCom (Carl Cloutier)

World's Greatest Magic V
(except where noted, the following tracks are from DeWolfe and its subsidiary labels)

- 'Sunrise' from Atmosphere (WGM 1-4 Recap)
- 'Driving Force' and 'Classical Excellence' ('Coming Up' segment)
- 'Round We Go' (Magic Unlimited)
- 'Heatstroke', 'Jumping Joker', 'Athleticism (Remix)' and 'Franky's' (The Majestix)
- 'National Emergency' and 'Breathless' (Brett Daniels - The Grand Canyon)
- 'Commitment', 'Brave New World', 'Aborigine Firedance 2' and 'Pagan Ritual' (Phelston Jones)
- 'Theatre Overture', 'Benny For Your Thoughts' and 'Starlight Concerto' (Dimmare)
- '5 Pack Driver', 'Monster', 'First Time' and 'Encounter' (John Gabriel)
- 'She Can't Love Me Like Me' (Goldfinger & Dove)
- 'Night Flight', 'Death Penalty', and 'Hostage (a)' (from KPM Music) (Jim Passe)
