= Franz Harary =

American magician and inventor

- Born: Franz Harary; July 18, 1962 (age 63); Ann Arbor, Michigan, U.S.
- Occupation(s): Magician, illusionist
- Known for: World's Greatest Magic
- Website: www.franzharary.com

Franz Harary (born July 18, 1962) is an American magician and inventor who has appeared on television shows such as the first episode of NBC's The World's Greatest Magic, on which Harary made the Space Shuttle appear to vanish.

While studying music at Eastern Michigan University and aspiring to be a singer and dancer on Broadway, Harary was designing illusions as a hobby. He began performing publicly after persuading the university's marching band leader to let him appear as part of the halftime show. Between 1982 and 1984, Harary's Odyssey In Illusion team designed and executed illusions for ballet troupes, ice revues, marching bands, and symphony orchestras. It was featured on ABC-TV's live telecast of the 1983 Thanksgiving Day parade in Detroit. At the end of 1983, Harary sent Michael Jackson a videotape of Odyssey In Illusions greatest hits and within a week was invited to perform as part of the Jacksons' "Victory Tour" in 1984. Harary made Jackson levitate and disappear on one side of the stage and reappear with his brothers on the other side.

Among other music acts he has designed illusions for are N*SYNC, Cher, Snoop Dogg, Tupac Shakur, Tone Loc, Styx, Dr. Dre, Usher, Boyz II Men, Queen Latifah, Hammer, Tina Turner, Reba McEntire and Missy Elliott.

In 1996 Harary created the magic segments for the Broadway production Ragtime, in which Houdini was one of its main characters.

== Television ==
In 2010, Harary was the principal judge in a magical TV series called India's Magic Star, telecast on the Indian channel STAR One.
