= Melinda Saxe =

American magician

- Born: March 6, 1965 (age 61); Tennessee, United States
- Occupations: Magician, dancer
- Years active: 1983–present
- Known for: The first woman magician to perform in Las Vegas
- Spouses: Lance Burton (m. 1993; div. 1994) Mark Evensvold (m. 2000)
- Partner: Rich Little (1988–1991)
- Children: 2
- Parent(s): Richard Saxe; Bonnie Saxe
- Relatives: David Saxe (brother)

Melinda Saxe (born March 6, 1965) is a magician from Las Vegas, Nevada. She is best known for her television performances and Las Vegas stage shows in which she was billed as "the First Lady of Magic". She often is associated with the Drill of Death illusion, a signature trick developed for her by André Kole.

== Early life ==
Saxe was born in Tennessee on March 6, 1965, to band leader Richard Saxe (born 1933) and dancer/show producer Bonnie Saxe (born 1941). She was born in a small town in Tennessee. At the age of three, Saxe moved to Las Vegas after her mother Bonnie landed a spot as a showgirl in the Folies Bergere show at the Tropicana. Saxe has two siblings, Suzanne and Las Vegas stage producer David Saxe. Saxe became interested in magic at the age of 16, and practiced it all day long from that point on. Saxe graduated from Bonanza High School in Las Vegas as a junior in 1982. At the age of 17, she joined Siegfried & Roy's magic show as a dancer.

== Career ==
Her title of "First Lady of Magic" originated as the billing for the various shows she presented in a succession of Las Vegas venues. Saxe is the first woman magician to perform in Las Vegas. Saxe starred in her first show at the Bourbon Street Hotel and Casino, when she was 19.

Moving on from Bourbon Street, Saxe began a family-friendly magic show at Las Vegas' Landmark Hotel and Casino in May 1988, under the title of 88 Follies Revue and renamed Follies Revue '89 the following year. During 1988, Saxe was honored at the Society of American Magicians, where she also performed. Saxe's mother was the director, producer, and choreographer for Saxe's show at the Landmark, while Suzanne Saxe was a lead dancer in the show and brother David Saxe worked as part of the technical crew. Saxe's show at the Landmark closed in late 1989 and reopened at the nearby MGM Marina hotel.

Saxe had a residency at Trump's Castle in Atlantic City, New Jersey, and a four-year run in her own 3,000-seat theatre in Branson, Missouri. In 1995, she was chosen by producer Gary Ouellet as one of the acts for the second of his World's Greatest Magic television specials broadcast on the NBC network. The show featured the television debut of the Drill of Death illusion, in which Saxe was chained up in front of a giant drill, which appeared to advance and impale her before lifting her up and spinning her limp body high above the stage. Ouellet was again influential in promoting Saxe's career, when she starred in her own special for Disney in 1997. Ouellet was producer for the show, which like her stage shows, was titled Melinda: First Lady of Magic. She also featured in the first of Ouellet's The World's Most Dangerous Magic specials in 1998, in which she escaped using levitation after being tied up and placed in a glass tank filled with snakes.

Saxe stopped performing in 2002, saying she intended to devote herself to starting a family with her new husband. In 2012, Melinda returned to the stage in the Planet Hollywood resort's V: The Ultimate Variety Show, one of several Las Vegas Strip productions helmed by her brother David Saxe.

== Awards ==
In 1998, the International Magicians Society named her "Magician of the Year" in its "Merlin" awards.

== Personal life ==
Saxe married fellow magician Lance Burton on August 30, 1993; they divorced a year later. In 2000 Saxe married Mark Evensvold, a managing partner in the P.F. Chang's restaurant chain. Evensvold and Saxe have two children and live in Las Vegas.

Saxe was engaged to Rich Little, but broke off the three-year relationship in 1991, saying she had discovered that he had secretly videotaped them having sex. Saxe sued Little for defamation, invasion of privacy, and inflicting emotional distress. Little claimed the videotaping was consensual. The lawsuit was settled out of court.
