= The Pendragons =

Team of American illusionists

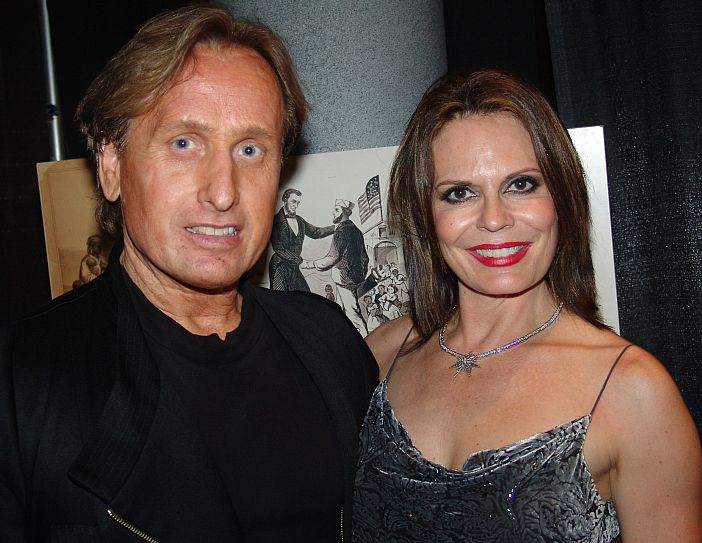
The Pendragons in 2005

Jonathan and Charlotte Pendragon were a husband-and-wife duo of American illusionists who called their work "physical grand illusion". They are widely known due to numerous national and international television appearances c. 1994–2009. They began performing separately in 2009 and divorced in 2012.

== Performing partnership ==
The couple met at the University of California, Irvine, where Jonathan was studying theatre and Charlotte was studying dance under choreographers Eugene Loring and George Balanchine. They married soon after. Charlotte (born Charlotte Ann Brown in Kalispell, Montana) is a dancer and former gymnast and body builder. Jonathan (born Claude Douglas Yarbrough) was a gymnast, spring board diver, martial arts expert and fencer. He used his athletic skills in a career as a Hollywood stuntman, performing the back hand springs for John Belushi down the church aisle in The Blues Brothers. He became Belushi's stunt double and friend, coordinating stunts and second directing in the movie Continental Divide.

Jonathan and Charlotte's athletic skills allowed the pair to develop a distinctive and graceful take on classic illusions such as levitation. Their shows included a number of illusions with which they became particularly associated, including Interlude, in which a woman crawls through a man's chest. They were the first artists to perform this trick. They are noted for their version of Metamorphosis. This illusion won them a place in the 50th edition of The Guinness Book of Records, under the heading of the "Fastest Transformation Illusion". Another illusion was Clearly Impossible, a sawing in half trick designed by Jonathan. Its distinctive feature is a transparent box that allowed the audience to see Charlotte from head to toe throughout the trick.

In 1996, for the finale of the third of NBC's World's Greatest Magic television specials, the duo made 25 show girls vanish and then re-appear in front of a live audience at Caesars Palace in Las Vegas, Nevada.

The couple performed together and resided in San Luis Obispo County, California until July 2009.

== Notable appearances ==
The Pendragons appeared on television in more than 50 countries and starred in 14 prime time specials on US networks, including their own Night of Magic show for Disney, several World's Greatest Magic shows for NBC, and Champions of Magic for ABC. For PBS television they performed with the Cincinnati Pops Orchestra, presenting illusions to classical music. For Universal Studios they wrote, directed and starred in a night-time magic spectacular, Cinemystique: Illusions of the Night which played to more than a million people. They were also frequently guests on programmes such as The Tonight Show with Jay Leno and the Paul Daniels Magic Show. They performed at presidential galas for US presidents Bill Clinton and George W. Bush, including a performance for President Clinton at the Ford's Theater for an ABC TV Special. They were singled out for praise by President George W. Bush at the end of a gala for him in June 2005.

In Britain they appeared at the Royal Variety Performance. They also appeared in a 1996 televised Royal gala show in Monaco, which included a collaboration with Princess Stéphanie. Jonathan and Charlotte performed their Artist's Dream illusion, a vignette about an artist's wife dying and appearing as a ghost, which was accompanied by a song composed and sung by Princess Stephanie and dedicated to her late mother Princess Grace. Jonathan also performed his Clearly Impossible sawing in half illusion, with Princess Stephanie taking Charlotte's place as the assistant being sawed in half. The gala was seen across the US as part of an ABC television special, Champions of Magic.

On June 24, 2008, the Pendragons appeared as contestants on NBC's reality television show, America's Got Talent. They were sent on to the next stage in Las Vegas. However they were never selected nor seen to move on to the top 40.

== Directing and production ==
Jonathan Pendragon has been involved with production and direction in many of the shows in which The Pendragons appeared and was jointly responsible with conductor Erich Kunzel for creating their innovative show with the Cincinnati Pops Orchestra.

Alongside director Norman Jewison, Jonathan co-directed a segment for the movie Bogus starring Whoopi Goldberg. He created and directed a levitation similar to the Pendragons' Midsummer's Night Dream levitation performed for Disney in Europe. He also directed second unit work for the movie Continental Divide.

== Awards and honors ==
Charlotte was the first woman to receive "The Magician of the Year Award" from the Academy of Magical Arts (The Magic Castle) in the USA. Together The Pendragons have won the prestigious award twice, a feat that only four other living magicians have accomplished. In 1991, Charlotte Pendragon became the first woman to become a Member of the Inner Circle of the British conjuring society The Magic Circle. Jonathan was chosen by Magic magazine as one of ten living magicians whose work shaped magic in the 20th and 21st centuries.

Jonathan was honored by the Lab School in Washington DC. Every year the school honors five distinguished individuals who have overcome a learning disability while growing up and gone on to accomplish great achievements in their fields. Other honorees include Cher and Tom Cruise.

== Accident ==
During a fall at his home in late September 2006, one of the arrows from Jonathan's archery collection pierced his liver, his stomach, and his heart. It happened while rehearsing a dangerous trick for his upcoming show involving a compound bow and arrow.

Shortly after the accident, Charlotte Pendragon published an account of the event. She wrote, "Jonathan is in the hospital following an accident involving an arrow from his archery. He fell on the non-sharp broken end of the arrow while trying to hang a light fixture. The arrow pierced through his stomach, liver, an artery and several inches in his heart. It is through speed of hospitalization, modern surgical techniques and Jonathan's will to live that he continues with us today. His surgeon [...] said this injury is always fatal and it is a miracle Jonathan is alive. He is recovering well after several hours of surgery including open heart surgery."

Jonathan made a full recovery.

== Arrest of Jonathan ==
On July 8, 2009, Jonathan (as Claude Yarbrough) was arrested at gunpoint for allegedly firing a bullet into the floor of his home during a dispute with his then wife.

On August 10, 2009, Pendragon was not able to attend his arraignment since he was confined in a medical facility on involuntary psychiatric hold. On 23 October 2009 at San Luis Obispo County Superior Court, Judge John Trice ruled that Claude Yarbrough must stand trial on felony charges of assault with a firearm, making criminal threats and other charges. On 9 March 2010, Jonathan pleaded no contest to two felony counts of assault with a deadly weapon as part of a plea bargain in which other charges were dropped. He was released after serving 245 days in county jail and sentenced to five years of probation.

After two years he was taken off formal and put on informal probation, and on 19 June 2014 at Orange County Superior Court, both felony charges were reduced to misdemeanors, and then dismissed.

== Solo life and careers ==
Charlotte premiered her solo act at the 2009 Daytona Festival of Magic. She marketed a floating ball Wonderball several years ago. She has seemingly retired and currently lives near her hometown of Porterville, California, along with her fiancé Randy Lessley.

Jonathan began his own solo act in 2010, at first with a new style of mentalism performed as a savant, rather than as a psychic, which he calls Metaphysics. He has since blended this style into his Grand Illusion, refining his character into an archetype called "the Poet/Wizard." He filed for divorce in 2011, and it became final in May 2012. On September 22, 2012, he married West McDonough, a member of the Glover family who owned the Magic Castle land and building. In 2014-2015 he was one of the most frequent performers on the CW television series Masters of Illusion, the Pop TV series Don't Blink, and on the REELZ series Extreme Escapes, as well as being a regular performer in the Masters of Illusion Live touring show. Since January 2014 he has been a regular bi-monthly columnist for Genii Magazine.
