= Bittar =

Bittar is a surname. Notable people with the surname include:

- Alexis Bittar (born 1968), American jewellery designer
- Hassan Bittar (born 1985), Lebanese footballer
- Jamille Bittar, Malian politician
- Marcelle Bittar (born 1981), Brazilian model
- Márcio Bittar (born 1963), Brazilian politician
- Mark Bittar, French close-up/card magician
