= Pradier =

Pradier is a surname. Notable people with the surname include:

- Charles-Simon Pradier (1786–1848), Swiss engraver
- Etienne Pradier (born 1965), French magician
- James Pradier (1790–1852), Swiss-born French sculptor
- Perrette Pradier (1938–2013), French actress

== See also ==
- Pradiers, commune in the Cantal department in south-central France
