= Woody Aragón =

Spanish magician (born 1974)

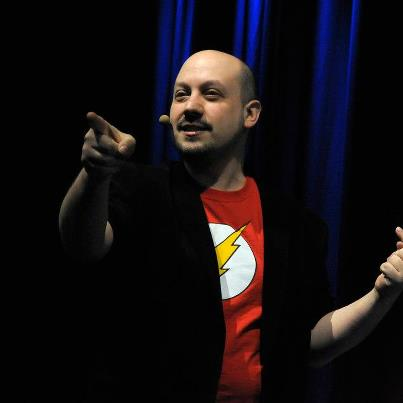
- Woody Aragón
- Born: Emilio de Paz Aragón; 3 October 1974 (age 51); Toledo, Spain
- Occupation: Magician

Woody Aragón (born as Emilio de Paz Aragón on 3 October 1974, Madrid), is a Spanish magician.

== Biography ==
Some of Aragón's magic creations have been shown on US television, for example in Jimmy Fallon's The Tonight Show or Penn & Teller: Fool Us. Penn & Teller also perform some of Aragón's card tricks in their own shows. Aragón has also appeared as a guest magician in Don Francisco presenta of Univision.

Aragón has done several tours in the United Kingdom and given conferences for other magicians. Ben Hanlin performed one of Aragón's card tricks in a special program of the ITV channel in the London Palladium. The magician Dynamo took as a basis one of his illusions, "The Postcards", for one of the tricks in his UKTV series "Magician Impossible".

Aragón has performed in the United States. Penn & Teller perform his game "Ritual of Love" in their Las Vegas show since 2016, as well as in their TV show Fool Us.

In 2017, the "Ritual of Love" was selected to open the Netflix series "Death by magic" in a version performed by Drummond Money-Couttsin in Cape Town College of Magic.

The TV station TVChosun, from South Korea, aired a special show dedicated to Aragón's magic in their series "Magic Control", which was presented by the tv star Charming Choi in which Aragón participated as a guest and performed a series of his effects for Korean celebrities.

In Spain, magicians such as Jandro, Luis Piedrahita, and Jorge Blass have presented his tricks on the radio, TED talks or on different TV shows such as El hormiguero. In 2010 he participated as a guest in the radio program "A Día de Hoy" on Punto Radio. From 2010 to 2012 he presented the section Hablemos de magia (Let's talk about Magic) on the radio program A vivir que son dos días in Cadena SER.

Aragón has written several books for magicians, including:

- A Book in English, a bestseller book of magic in the years 2011 and 2014. The book won the prize "Magic Academy Award" for the best book of magic (Tannen's, New York, 2012).
- Memorandum, where he described his own mnemonic stack, memorisation techniques as well as tricks and theory related to mnemonic card magic.

He has also advised other magicians such as David Blaine, the Portuguese Luis de Matos, the Argentinian Norberto Jansenson, and the Spanish Jorge Blass. All of them present or have presented some of Aragóns' materials in their shows.

Aragón teaches magic classes at the magic school Gran Escuela de Magia "Ana Tamariz", where he explains both card magic and theory related to card tricks.

He directs and organises the annual international magic festival Toledo Ilusión, which takes place in his hometown, Toledo, Spain.

== Performer ==
Aragón is one of the magic stars in Hollywood's Magic Castle where he regularly performs, and was nominated in 2015 as "Close-up magician of the year".

He has performed in front of celebrities such as Steve Buscemi, Jorge García, and Conan O'Brien. He frequently attends and performs in magic conventions around the world such as: USA, Canada, Uruguay, Colombia, United Kingdom, France, Italy, Portugal, Hungary, Finland, Germany, Belgium, Japan and Taiwan.

In Spain, Aragón, together with two other Spanish magicians, Miguel Ángel Gea and Pepo Capel, founded the Enchanted Theater in Madrid. The Enchanted Theatre is a theatre specially created for close up magic shows. He regularly performs in this theatre.

== Prizes ==
Aragón was the International Federation of Magic Societies (FISM) (Fédération Internationale des Sociétés Magiques) champion in North America in 2011, followed by European FISM championship in 2014. He was disqualified in the World FISM championship in 2015 in Rimini, as he exceeded the allotted time by 6 seconds.

Aragón was card magic champion in Spain in 2005 and obtained the Ascanio Prize in 2006. He was the first Spanish magician to obtain the prestigious prize "Ron MacMillan" in London's International Magic Convention (2011), as well as one of the few Spanish magicians to be nominated as Magician of the year 2016 by Hollywood's Academy of Magical Arts.

- Spanish Card Magic Champion (2005)
- Ascanio Prize (2006)
- Ron McMillan (International Magic Convention, London) (2011)
- North America FISM (2011)
- Europe FISM (2014)
- Two times nominated as Magician of the year by the Academy of Magical Arts (2015 and 2017)

== Masters ==
Aragón met Juan Tamariz when he was 19 years old and started training with him. For many years they met weekly for dinner and shared magic in sessions that could last for over 12 hours.

Tamariz contributed the prologue to his A Book in English.

== Other ==
The GENII magazine, a magazine dedicated to magic, featured Aragón on the September 2012 issue's front page

Aragón is also mentioned in the 2012 novel Fooling Houdini, written by the NY Times writer Alex Stone. He designed an interactive card magic game.

He was a guest magician at the promotion of Nacho Vigalondo's movie Los Cronocrímenes.
