= Penn & Teller: Fool Us =

American magic competition television series

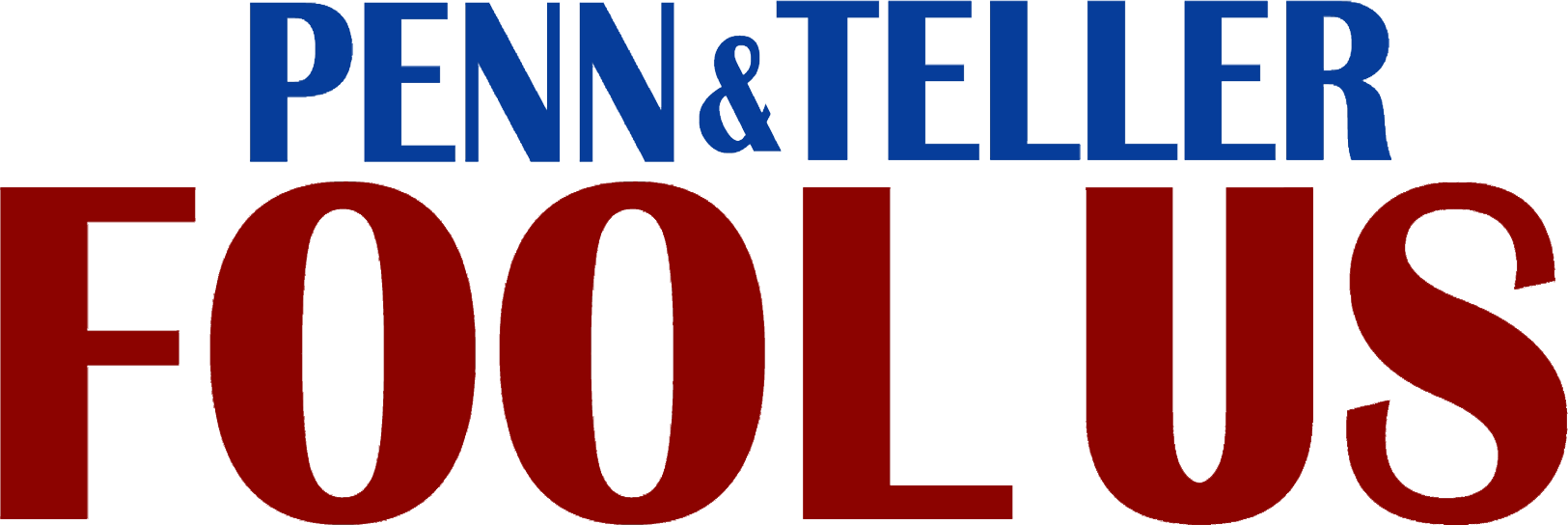
- Also known as: Fool Us; Penn & Teller: Fool Us in Vegas
- Genre: Entertainment; Comedy
- Created by: Penn Jillette; Teller; Peter Adam Golden; Andrew Golder
- Directed by: Dennis Rosenblatt
- Presented by: Jonathan Ross; Alyson Hannigan; Brooke Burke
- Judges: Penn Jillette; Teller
- Narrated by: Dominic Byrne; Penn Jillette
- Composers: Nick Foster; Ken Bolam
- Countries of origin: United Kingdom; United States
- Original language: English
- No. of seasons: 11
- No. of episodes: 173

Production
- Executive producers: Andrew Golder; Peter Davey; Peter Adam Golden; Lincoln Hiatt
- Producers: Johnny Thompson (2011–2019); Michael Close (2019–present); Danny Harris (2015–present)
- Production locations: London (season 1); Las Vegas (season 2–present)
- Running time: 45 minutes; 65 minutes (pilot)
- Production companies: 1/17 Productions; September Films

Original release
- Network: ITV (season 1); The CW (seasons 2–present)
- Release: January 7, 2011 – present

Penn & Teller: Fool Us is a magic competition television series in which magicians perform tricks in front of American magician-comedian duo Penn & Teller. Its first two seasons were hosted by Jonathan Ross, the third through ninth seasons were hosted by Alyson Hannigan and the tenth and eleventh season by Brooke Burke. Fool Us was filmed at Fountain Studios in London, England (season one) and the Penn & Teller Theater at the Rio All-Suite Hotel & Casino (season two onward), located in Las Vegas. After each performance, if Penn & Teller cannot figure out how a trick was done, the magician(s) who performed it win a Fool Us trophy (since season 2) and a five-star trip to Las Vegas to perform as the opening act in Penn & Teller's show, also at the Rio Hotel & Casino.

The eleventh season aired January–December 2025.

== Format ==
Each episode starts off with the introduction stating the purpose of the series. Penn & Teller come out and take their seats towards center stage, and hopeful magicians perform. Most episodes are arranged to showcase four acts, performed in front of Penn & Teller and a live studio audience. For the second half of season 7 through season 9, the performances were to a virtual audience due to the coronavirus pandemic.

After each performance, Penn & Teller privately confer while the host interviews the magician. Penn then reveals if they know how the trick was performed, typically using cryptic language suggesting the kind of trick used. When cryptic language fails, they generally write down the method and present it privately to the magicians to confirm, so as to avoid publicly exposing the secrets behind the trick. Teller notes that the doublespeak helps teach people new techniques without spoiling the trick.

If Penn & Teller are wrong, or cannot figure out how the trick was done, the magician wins a Fool Us trophy (humorously branded with the abbreviation "FU") and the opportunity to later perform at one of Penn & Teller's Las Vegas shows. A backstage judge or judges, versed in the techniques of the magic industry and privately informed how the trick is done prior to the show, makes any necessary calls whether Penn & Teller were properly fooled. At the end of each episode, Penn & Teller perform a magic act of their own.

== Production ==
The pilot of Fool Us was first commissioned by John Kaye Cooper, the controller of entertainment for ITV. In February 2011, it was announced that due to good viewing figures, a series of eight episodes had been commissioned, and would be produced by September Films and 1/17 Productions. The eight episodes were shot in a ten-day filming block, and began airing in June 2011.

It was announced on June 28, 2012 that ITV had cancelled the show, despite averaging 4 million viewers, higher than the norm for the timeslot. After finding moderate ratings success in running the ITV-produced episodes during the summer of 2014, The CW ordered a second season of original episodes to air in 2015. The second season was a ratings hit for The CW, giving the network its highest ratings in that time slot compared to the previous five years.

On August 11, 2015 the series was renewed for a third season by The CW which premiered on July 13, 2016, now hosted by Alyson Hannigan. The fourth season premiered on July 13, 2017. A special one-off April Fool's episode was broadcast on April 2, 2018 as a precursor to the fifth season, which premiered on June 25, 2018. After another April Fool's episode on April 1, 2019, the sixth season premiered on June 17, 2019.

In the summer of 2020 the show was renewed for a seventh season, which was set to begin filming in October 2020. Due to COVID-19 safety and travel restrictions, the second half of season 7 was filmed with a virtual audience, and international acts performed via video from their home countries. The magicians and crew were tested for COVID over 660 times, with every result negative. On January 20, 2022, the series was renewed for a ninth season. On May 18, 2023, the series was renewed for a tenth season, with new host Brooke Burke which was taped during the first weeks of July in the Penn & Teller Theater at the Rio Hotel and Casino in Las Vegas. The season premiered on October 27, 2023. In June 2024, the series was renewed for an eleventh season. Season 11 premiered on January 24, 2025.

== Episodes ==
=== Series overview ===
Season	Episodes		Originally released		
Season	Episodes		First released	Last released	Network
1	Pilot		January 7, 2011		ITV
1	8		June 18, 2011	August 28, 2011	ITV
2	13		July 6, 2015	October 5, 2015	The CW
3	13		July 13, 2016	September 16, 2016	The CW
4	13		July 13, 2017	November 30, 2017	The CW
5	13		June 25, 2018	October 1, 2018	The CW
6	13		June 17, 2019	September 30, 2019	The CW
7	28	14	June 22, 2020	November 16, 2020	The CW
7	28	14	January 8, 2021	April 16, 2021	The CW
8	14		October 1, 2021	March 4, 2022	The CW
9	14		October 14, 2022	April 14, 2023	The CW
10	20		October 27, 2023	April 26, 2024	The CW
11	20		January 24, 2025	December 5, 2025	The CW

Performers who fooled Penn & Teller are listed in bold type.

=== Season 1 (2011) ===
No. overall	No. in season	Title	Original release date	Prod. code (Note: As listed in U.S. listings)	UK viewers (millions) (Note: SD viewers only.)
1	Pilot	"How to Saw a Woman in Half"	January 7, 2011	109	4.28
(United Kingdom) Ali Cook, close-up and stage magician; (United Kingdom) Richard Bellars, close-up and stage magician; (United Kingdom) Michael Vincent, close-up and stage magician; (United Kingdom) **John Archer, magical comedy entertainer**; (United Kingdom) James More, stage magician and illusionist; (United Kingdom) **Benjamin Earl, card manipulator**; ITV website exclusives; (United Kingdom) Damien O'Brien, street magician; (United Kingdom) Noel Qualter, close-up magician; Penn and Teller perform "Cell Fish" (later repeated for US run) and sawing a woman in halves
2	1	"Teller Sucks... Helium"	June 18, 2011	107	4.07
(United Kingdom) High Jinx, illusionists and circus performers; (United Kingdom) Jon Allen, street magician; (United Kingdom) **Graham Jolley, mind reader and mentalist**; Penn and Teller perform "Helium"
3	2	"Stab a Card, Any Card..."	June 25, 2011	102	3.57
(United Kingdom) Mark Shortland, magical comedy entertainer; (France) **Mathieu Bich, card illusionist**; (United Kingdom) Young and Strange, street stage illusionists; (United Kingdom) Daniel Madison, card illusionist; Penn and Teller perform "Hand Stab"
4	3	"Solid Goldfish"	July 2, 2011	103	3.12
(United Kingdom) Piff the Magic Dragon, (Note: Although Piff, after being shown Teller's deduction, stated that he did not fool Penn & Teller, Penn later admitted in a blog post that he and Teller had gotten Piff's technique wrong but Piff played along with them, although this has not been mentioned on-screen. Piff's subsequent guest appearances on the show in the episodes "Something Fishy This Way Comes" and "Penn the Magic Dragon" have been as a joint magic performance act alongside Penn & Teller at the end of each episode.) magical comedy entertainer, (Hungary) Soma, illusionist; (United Kingdom) Alan Hudson, close-up magician; (United Kingdom) Damien O'Brien, street magician; Teller performs "Silver Fish"
5	4	"Teller is a Blockhead"	July 9, 2011	104	3.27
(United Kingdom) Daniel Kramer, illusionist; (United Kingdom) Romany, the Diva of Magic, burlesque dancer and magician; (United Kingdom) Alan Rorrison, close-up magician; (United Kingdom) **Richard Bellars, mentalist**; Penn and Teller perform "Blockhead"
6	5	"Penn Gets Nailed"	July 16, 2011	105	3.29
(France) Cubic Act, illusionists; (United Kingdom) **Nick Einhorn, mentalist**; (United Kingdom) Michael Vincent, close-up and stage magician; (United Kingdom) **Morgan & West, close-up and stage magicians**; Penn and Teller perform "Nail Gun"
7	6	"The Magic of Polyester"	July 23, 2011	106	3.62
(United Kingdom) Gazzo, street magician; (United Kingdom) Colin McLeod, mentalist; (United Kingdom) Keelan and Charlotte, quick-change artists; (Sweden) **Brynolf & Ljung, illusionists**; Penn and Teller perform "Polyester"
8	7	"A Bellyful of Needles"	July 30, 2011	101	3.22
(Canada) **Shawn Farquhar, (Note: Although Penn & Teller saw Farquhar perform a deck switch, which they had previously decided would automatically mean a contestant did not fool them, they considered themselves fooled because they could not explain the essence of how Farquhar had performed his card trick.) close-up/card magician**; (United Kingdom) Manuel Martinez, illusionist (Note: Martinez presented himself as Cuban, but was outed as British by Penn & Teller following the conclusion of his act.); (France) **Etienne Pradier, card magician**; (United Kingdom) Chris Dugdale, illusionist; Teller performs "East Indian Needle Mystery"
9	8	"Water Tanks for the Memories"	August 28, 2011	108	N/A
(United Kingdom) **Lee Hathaway, cabaret act and close-up magician**; (United Kingdom) Jack Taperell, close-up magician; (United Kingdom) Laura London, illusionist; (United Kingdom) Paul & Martin Daniels, renowned magicians; Penn and Teller perform "The Water Tank"

Unaired segments include:

- (United Kingdom) Chris Cox, mind reader (unaired as he was the only performer who failed in his performance)
- (United Kingdom) James Brown, stage magician
- (United Kingdom) Marc Oberon, card magician
- (United Kingdom) David Masters, illusionist
- (United Kingdom) Noel Qualter, close-up magician
- (United Kingdom) David Jay, illusionist

=== Season 2 (2015) ===
No. overall	No. in season	Title	Original release date	Prod. code	U.S. viewers (millions)
10	1	"Phone-y Business"	July 6, 2015	202	1.66
(United States) Jon Armstrong, close-up magician; (France) Xavier Mortimer, illusionist; (United States) The Shocker, mentalist/illusionist; (United States) **Steven Brundage, close-up magician**; Penn and Teller perform "Cell Fish"
11	2	"The Invisi-Ball Thread"	July 13, 2015	203	2.01
(United States) / (Australia) **Leon and Romy, illusionists**; (United States) Mike Hammer, illusionist; (Canada) / (United States) **Shin Lim, close-up magician**; (United States) Peter Boie, illusionist; Teller performs "The Red Ball"
12	3	"Shoot to Kill"	July 20, 2015	201	1.81
(United States) Brian Brushwood, close-up magician; (Germany) Simon Pierro, illusionist; (United States) **Handsome Jack, comedy magician**; (United States) Kyle Knight & Mistie, illusionist; Penn and Teller perform "Magic Bullets" (The bullet catch)
13	4	"Knife of the Party"	July 27, 2015	204	2.24
(United States) Austin Janik, close-up/card magician; (United States) Amazing Allison, mentalist; (United States) Mac King, illusionist; (United States) Norman Ng, close-up magician; Penn and Teller perform "Knife"
14	5	"Mission Impossi-Ball"	August 3, 2015	205	2.06
(United States) Bill Cook, close-up magician; (Canada) **Wes Barker, illusionist**; (United States) Matthew Holtzclaw, close-up magician; (United States) David Regal, illusionist; Penn and Teller perform their version of the Cups and Balls
15	6	"Now THAT'S Bunny!"	August 10, 2015	206	2.35
(Canada) Jay Sankey, close-up magician; (United States) **Greg Wilson, illusionist**; (United States) Trigg Watson, close-up magician; (United States) Jen Kramer, close-up magician; Penn and Teller pull a rabbit out of a hat
16	7	"Penn's Favorite Card Trick"	August 17, 2015	207	2.10
(Ukraine) / (United States) **Kostya Kimlat, card magician**; (United States) Frederick Falk, close-up magician; (Canada) Chris Funk, card/stage magician; (United States) Nate Dendy, stage magician; Penn and teller perform a card trick in which they make the "Queen of Hearts" appear.
17	8	"Teller Plays with a Full Deck"	August 24, 2015	209	1.87
(United States) Blake Vogt, close-up magician; (United States) **Joshua Jay, close-up magician**; (United States) Levent, comedy magician; (United States) Ben Seidman, illusionist; Penn and Teller perform "The Atheist's Deck of Cards"
18	9	"Star Spangled Magic"	August 31, 2015	210	2.11
(United States) Riley Siegler, close-up/card magician; (China) / (United States) Jade, illusionist; (United States) Ran'd Shine, close-up magician; (United States) **David Roth, (Note: Roth's award was given as an honorary award since Roth pioneered coin magic, and Penn & Teller stated that they only knew the tricks because they had read his books.) coin magician**; Penn and teller "burn" an American flag.
19	10	"Where There's Smoke There's Magic"	September 14, 2015	212	1.46
(United States) Joel Meyers & Spidey, mentalist duo; (United States) **Rick Lax, close-up/card magician**; (United States) Marcus Eddie, illusionist; (United States) Bruce Gold, comedy magician; Penn and Teller perform "Looks Simple"
20	11	"Teller Deflowers a Shadow"	September 21, 2015	211	1.15
(United States) Scott Alexander & Puck, illusionist; (United States) **Eric Jones, coin magician**; (United States) Mark Calabrese, close-up/card magician; (United States) Paul Vigil, mentalist (Note: Although Paul Vigil did not fool them, Penn admitted that the only reason they know how his trick is done is because they have read it in Paul's books.); Teller performs "Shadows"
21	12	"Penn & Teller Ring Someone's Neck"	September 28, 2015	208	1.34
(United States) Victor & Diamond, illusionists; (United States) **Francis Menotti, mentalist**; (China) / (United States) Nash Fung, close-up magician; (United States) Chad Juros, rope magician; Penn and Teller perform their version of "Powers of Darkness"
22	13	"An Egg-Cellent Trick"	October 5, 2015	213	1.36
(United States) Derek Hughes, close-up/card magician; (United States) Reuben Moreland, illusionist; (United States) **Suzanne, close-up magician**; (United States) Jared Kopf, mentalist; Penn and Teller perform "One Minute Egg"

=== Season 3 (2016) ===
No. overall	No. in season	Title	Original release date	Prod. code	U.S. viewers (millions)
23	1	"Won't Get Fooled Again...?"	July 13, 2016	304	1.46
(Canada) **Shawn Farquhar, (Note: Appeared in a previous episode where they fooled Penn & Teller.) mentalist**; (United States) Michael Kent, comedy magician; (United States) Nathan Burton, illusionist; (United States) Nathan Coe Marsh, close-up magician (Note: Penn admitted that they do not know how he got the golf ball inside the jar, but the contestant agreed that he did not fool them, since they got all the other parts of the trick.); Penn and Teller perform "Love Ritual" (routine originally created by Woody Aragón)
24	2	"Jesse Eisenberg Gets Carded"	July 20, 2016	303	1.21
(United States) Brett Loudermilk, sword swallower; (United States) **Dan Harlan, close-up/card magician**; (Canada) Ryan Joyce, illusionist; (United States) Kyle Eschen, comedy magician; Penn and Teller perform a card trick with Jesse Eisenberg in which they make selected cards appear as tattoos on their bodies.
25	3	"Have A Blast"	July 27, 2016	302	1.18
(Mexico) Robert Ramirez, comedy mentalist; (Poland) / (United Kingdom) Dominik (Krzanowski), illusionist; (United States) Joel Ward, comedy magician; (Canada) **Mahdi Gilbert, close-up/card magician**; Penn and Teller perform "Blast Off"
26	4	"Penn Plays With Fire"	August 3, 2016	305	1.42
(United States) David and Leeman, comedy magician; (United States) **Jibrizy, close-up magician**; (United States) Rick Maisel, escape artist; (Dominican Republic) Felix Bodden, close-up/card magician; Penn performs a fire eating routine.
27	5	"You Dirty Rathead!"	August 10, 2016	301	1.43
(United States) Alex Ramon, illusionist; (Canada) Greg Frewin, illusionist; (United States) **Vinny Grosso, comedy magician**; (United States) Arthur Trace, close-up magician; Penn and Teller perform the "Room 101 Card Trick"
28	6	"Penn & Teller Snake their Chances"	August 17, 2016	309	1.47
(United States) Elliot Zimet, illusionist; (United States) **Paul Gertner, close-up/card magician**; (Canada) Matthew DiSero, comedy mentalist; (Lithuania) Rokas Bernatonis, illusionist; Penn and Teller cut and restore a live snake while discussing the controversy that arose when they performed the trick on Saturday Night Live in the 80s.
29	7	"Juggle, Juggle, Penn's in Trouble"	August 24, 2016	308	1.49
(Canada) **Vitaly Beckman, illusionist**; (Australia) **Simon Coronel, (Note: Although Coronel indicated during the initial broadcast that he had not fooled Penn & Teller, they confirmed in their "April Fool Us Day" special on April 2, 2018, that they had indeed been fooled.) illusionist**; (United States) Mac King, comedy magician; (United States) Kevin Viner, mentalist; Penn juggles lit torches and broken bottles while reciting a monologue
30	8	"Here's Moxie!"	August 31, 2016	306	1.78
(United States) Matthew Laslo, illusionist; (United States) Rob Zabrecky, mentalist; (United States) David Garrard, illusionist; (United States) **Wayne Hoffman, mentalist**; Penn and Teller perform "Chipper"
31	9	"The Great Escape"	September 2, 2016	307	1.28
(France) Xavier Mortimer, illusionist; (United States) Fielding West, comedy magician; (United States) Caleb Wiles, close up/card magician; (United States) Kevin Hall The Magic Maniac, comedy magician; Pilobolus performs a tribute to Houdini.
32	10	"To Tea Or Not To Tea?"	September 7, 2016	310	1.54
(Germany) **Timon Krause, mentalist**; (United States) Kyle Marlett, close up/card magician; (Canada) The Evasons, mentalists; (United States) Chef Anton, illusionist; Penn and Teller perform "TSA"
33	11	"Penn & Teller Get Trapped"	September 9, 2016	311	1.41
(United States) Christopher Tracy & Jim Leach, (Note: Performed as the magic duo "Hal & Kellar" parodying Penn & Teller.) comedy magicians; (Canada) Neil Croswell, illusionist; (United States) Ben Young, illusionist; (Ethiopia) / (Ireland) Henok, mentalist; Penn and Teller perform "Animal Traps"
34	12	"Penn & Teller Rip for your Pleasure"	September 14, 2016	312	1.38
(United States) Joseph Réohm, illusionist; (United States) Brent Braun, close-up/card magician; (United States) **Chris Rose, close-up magician**; (United States) Charles Bach, illusionist; Penn and Teller perform the torn and restored newspaper.
35	13	"Can Penn & Teller Fool Penn & Teller"	September 16, 2016	313	1.34
(United States) Anthony Asimov, close-up magician; (United States) Angela Funovits, mentalist; (United States) **Ivan Amodei, mentalist**; (United States) Vince Charming, illusionist; Penn and Teller perform signed card to mouth with a muffin.

=== Season 4 (2017) ===
No. overall	No. in season	Title	Original release date	Prod. code	U.S. viewers (millions)
36	1	"Penn & Teller Teach You a Trick"	July 13, 2017	402	1.62
(United States) **Richard Turner, card mechanic**; (United Kingdom) Young & Strange, illusionist; (United States) Kayla Drescher, illusionist; (United States) Mike Super, mentalist; Penn and Teller teach a trick you can do at home, featuring a card reveal from the cast of Jane the Virgin
37	2	"Penn, Teller and a Mind Reading Chicken"	July 20, 2017	401	1.72
(United States) Jonathan Burns, comedy magician; (Belgium) **Jo De Rijck, mentalist**; (United States) David Caserta, illusionist; (United States) Jimmy Ichihana, close-up/card magician; Penn and Teller perform "Scleral Shells," in which a chosen card is revealed on Teller's eyeballs.
38	3	"Teller Flips a Bird"	July 27, 2017	403	1.56
(United States) Misty Lee, close-up magician; (Canada) / (United States) **Shin Lim, (Note: Appeared in a previous episode where they fooled Penn & Teller.) close-up magician**; (United Kingdom) Andi Gladwin, comedy magician; (Canada) Hatfields, illusionist; Penn and Teller perform Johnny Thompson's "The Great Tomsoni and Company" (comedy dove production routine).
39	4	"50/50 Chance"	August 3, 2017	405	1.64
(Canada) Matt Johnson, escape artist; (Ecuador) **Siegfried Tieber, close-up/card magician**; (United States) Jafo (Jason Fields), close-up/coin magician; (United States) Jessica Jane Peterson, illusionist; Penn and Teller perform the "World's Most Expensive Card Trick" on the Las Vegas Strip.
40	5	"Does This Trick Ring a Bell?"	August 10, 2017	407	1.53
(United States) Dyno Staats, illusionist; (United States) Aiden Sinclair, mentalist; (Sweden) Axel Adler, illusionist; (United States) **David Parr, close-up/card magician**; Penn and Teller perform "Circle Stop"
41	6	"Something Fishy This Way Comes"	August 17, 2017	412	1.49
(United States) Dan Sperry, illusionist; (Canada) **Jean-Pierre Parent, (Note: It was later revealed that Penn & Teller were only fooled due to the actions of one of the show's writers, Matt Donnelly.) comedy magician**; (Scotland) Naathan Phan, illusionist; (Canada) Richard Forget, illusionist; Penn and Teller perform a book test with Piff the Magic Dragon.
42	7	"A Big Round of Applause for Alyson"	August 24, 2017	411	1.48
(Italy) Riccardo Berdini, mentalist; (Russia) / (Canada) Yan Markson, mentalist/magician; (Czech Republic) **Ondřej Pšenička, close-up magician**; (United States) Glenn Morphew, close-up/card magician; Penn and Teller perform "Surveillance"
43	8	"I Dream of Genie Tube"	September 7, 2017	410	1.42
(United States) Dennis Watkins, close-up/card magician; (United States) **Jeff McBride, manipulation**; (United States) Kevin Li, close-up illusionist; (United States) Steve Marshall, dice stacking magician; Penn and Teller perform "Tube to Bunny" (Genie Tube effect)
44	9	"Penn & Teller Are Full of Hot Air"	September 14, 2017	413	1.48
(United States) Liberty Larsen, close-up/card magician; (Spain) **Jorge Blass, close-up/card magician**; (United States) Paul Gertner, close-up/card magician; (Italy) Sergio Starman, close-up magician; Penn and Teller perform "Flates"
45	10	"Monkey Business"	September 21, 2017	404	1.55
(United States) Sean-Paul & Juliana Fay, close-up/card magicians; (United States) Jason Andrews, illusionist; (United States) **Eric Mead, close-up magician**; (United States) Reza Borchardt, card magician; Penn and Teller perform "The National Magic Trick" (vanishing handkerchief)
46	11	"Penn Does the Heavy Lifting"	September 25, 2017	409	0.92
(United States) **Stuart MacDonald, close-up magician**; (United States) Kyle Littleton, card magician; (United States) Lion Fludd, close-up/card magician; (United States) The Beckers, illusionists; Penn and Teller perform Robert-Houdin's "Light and Heavy Chest"
47	12	"Penn & Teller & Dracula"	September 28, 2017	408	1.66
(United States) Mike Bliss, comedy magician; (Canada) Ekaterina, mentalist; (Spain) **Javi Benitez, close-up/card magician**; (Israel) Ran Gafner, mentalist; Penn and Teller perform their Dracula presentation of the ball and vase.
48	13	"Hanging Out with Penn & Teller"	November 30, 2017 (Note: Scheduled October 2, 2017 airing of this episode was postponed following the 2017 Las Vegas shooting.)	406	1.14
(France) / (Canada) Patrik Kuffs, close-up/card magician; (United States) Todd Lamanske, card magician; (United States) **Adam Wilber, close-up/card magician**; (Spain) Hector, close-up illusionist; Jen Kramer and AmberLynn Walker (Note: Outside of competition, performed in the magic act at the end of the episode together with Penn & Teller.)

=== Season 5 (2018) ===
No. overall	No. in season	Title	Original release date	Prod. code	U.S. viewers (millions)
49	–	"April Fool Us Day"	April 2, 2018	N/A	0.94
A special episode.
50	1	"Penn the Magic Dragon"	June 25, 2018	503	1.35
(United States) Matt Marcy, comedy magician; (Canada) **The Sentimentalists, mentalist**; (United States) Andrew Evans, illusionist; (Australia) Dom Chambers, close-up magician; Penn and Piff the Magic Dragon perform a "Pop and Piff" routine
51	2	"The Rematch"	July 2, 2018	502	1.34
(United States) **Vinny Grosso, (Note: Appeared in a previous episode where they fooled Penn & Teller.) comedy magician**; (United Kingdom) Morgan & West, close-up and stage; (United States) **Paul Gertner, close-up/card magician**; (United States) Eric Jones, coin magician; Penn and Teller perform "Misdirection"
52	3	"Penn & Teller Get Loopy"	July 9, 2018	504	1.29
(United States) Ryan Chandler, close-up magician; (Canada) **Ryan Hayashi, samurai/coin magician**; (Germany) Dirk Losander, illusionist; (United States) Ed Ripley, close-up magician; Penn and Teller perform the "Tomsoni Box"
53	4	"Here Comes the Magic"	July 16, 2018	501	1.39
(United States) **Danny Cole, illusionist**; (Ukraine) / (United States) Kostya Kimlat, card magician; (Sweden) Håkan Berg, comedy magician; (United States) John Hinton, close-up magician; Penn and Teller perform "Blues Box"
54	5	"Psych!!"	July 23, 2018	508	1.45
(United States) **Emily Victoria, mentalist**; (Germany) Patrick Folkerts, illusionist; (United States) Migz, close-up/card magician; (United States) Seth Grabel, escape artist; Penn and Teller perform the egg bag with Kim Raver.
55	6	"Penn & Teller Against the World"	July 30, 2018	506	1.38
(Japan) Taijyu Fujiyama, close-up/stage magician; (Germany) Pit Hartling, close-up/card magician; (Australia) **Helen Coghlan, illusionist**; (Israel) Menny Lindenfeld, mentalist; Penn and Teller perform a shell game with mint containers.
56	7	"Imagine (Magic) Dragons"	August 6, 2018	505	1.31
(United States) Erik Tait, comedy magician; (United Kingdom) **Rebecca Herrera, mentalist**; (Japan) TanBA, danger magician; (Canada) Ian Stewart, stunt magician/hypnotist; Penn and Teller perform a card trick with Dan Reynolds
57	8	"Here Lie Penn & Teller"	August 13, 2018	509	1.60
(Canada) **Damien James, mentalist/ventriloquist**; (China) Kelvin Chow, close-up/card magician; (United States) Joshua Lozoff, mentalist; (Canada) Murray SawChuck, illusionist; Penn and Teller teach a card trick in which the card is revealed on a grave marker.
58	9	"Teller's Gambling Problem"	August 20, 2018	511	1.28
(United States) Will Bradshaw, stunt magician; (United States) Eric Dittelman, comedy mentalist; (Finland) **Christian Engblom, close-up/card magician**; (France) Compagnie des Dragonfly, illusionist group; Penn and Teller perform "Teller's Gambling Problem" with Tom Green
59	10	"Penn & Teller Keep You In Suspense"	August 27, 2018	507	1.62
(Germany) Simon Pierro, illusionist; (Canada) **Nicholas Wallace, danger magician**; (Canada) Darcy Oake, close-up/card magician; (United States) Alex Geiser, coin magician; Penn and Teller perform the chair suspension.
60	11	"The Fool Us Zone"	September 3, 2018	510	1.34
(United States) Tyler Twombly, close-up illusionist; (United States) Michael Rubinstein, coin magician; (United States) Anastasia Synn, illusionist; (United States) Adam Cheyer, card magician; Penn performs "Barrel"
61	12	"Never Trust A Magician"	September 24, 2018	512	0.89
(France) **Alexandra Duvivier, (Note: Penn & Teller later revealed on their "April Fool Us Day" special on April 1, 2019 that in scenes deleted from the episode, Duvivier initially indicated that she had not fooled them, due to her misunderstanding Penn's cryptic language. However, after Teller went backstage and spoke with her privately about her techniques used on stage, he informed Penn that they had gotten their deductions wrong. They then called Duviver back to the stage and told her that they were indeed fooled by her, which was shown during the original broadcast.) card magician**; (United States) Christine Barger & Darlene Hollywood, mentalists; (United Kingdom) Jamie Allan, close-up illusionist; (Ireland) / (United States) Christopher Grace, mentalist; Penn performs "Trust"
62	13	"Let's Hear It For The Kids"	October 1, 2018	513	1.16
(Spain) Kiko Pastur, close-up magician; (Canada) Jason Palter, comedy magician; (United Kingdom) Michael Gee, card magician; (United States) **Bryan Saint, illusionist**; Penn and Teller perform a trick in which children are taught to correctly guess the color of randomly selected balls.

=== Season 6 (2019) ===
No. overall	No. in season	Title	Original release date	Prod. code	U.S. viewers (millions)
63	–	"April Fool Us Day 2019"	April 1, 2019	N/A	0.74
A special episode.
64	1	"David Copperfield vs. Penn & Teller"	June 17, 2019	601	1.31
(Netherlands) Jan Reinder, stunt magician; (Czech Republic) **Ondřej Pšenička, (Note: Appeared in a previous episode where they fooled Penn & Teller.) close-up/card magician**; (United States) Giancarlo Bernini, close-up magician; (United States) **Penn & Teller, (Note: Magician David Copperfield was invited to judge the act) comedy magicians**
65	2	"They're Baaack!"	June 24, 2019	602	1.10
(Spain) Javi Benitez, close-up magician; (United Kingdom) Rebecca Herrera, mentalist; (Australia) **Helen Coghlan, escapologist**; (United States) Danny Cole, illusionist
66	3	"Penn & Teller vs. Inventors"	July 1, 2019	603	1.14
(Sweden) Arkadia, comedy mentalist; (Germany) **Harry Keaton, hypnotist**; (Spain) **Jandro, comedy mentalist**; (United States) Derek Selinger, danger magician/illusionist
67	4	"Penn & Teller Cure the Common Code"	July 8, 2019	604	1.15
(United States) Anna DeGuzman, card manipulator; (Italy) **Raffaele Scircoli, mentalist**; (United States) Allen Abbott, illusionist; (Germany) Axel Hecklau, close-up magician
68	5	"Penn & Teller Hit the Streets"	July 15, 2019	605	1.18
(Spain) **Adrián Carratalá, close-up magician**; (United States) Kevin Blake, card mentalist; (Canada) Ryan Stock & AmberLynn Walker, illusionists/danger duo; (Italy) Christopher Castellini, mentalist
69	6	"Duck! It's Alyson!"	July 22, 2019	606	1.18
(United States) Jimmy Ichihana, close-up/card magician; (Belgium) Herbert & Alyson, (Note: Herbert's real name is Sebastien Dethise.) illusionists; (Canada) Eric Samuels, mentalist; (China) **Rabby Yang, mentalist**
70	7	"Are You Better Magicians Than a 6th Grader?"	July 29, 2019	607	1.15
(Norway) Hans Petter Secker, card mechanic; (Spain) **Xulio Merino, close-up magician**; (United States) Zoe LaFleur, close-up/card magician; (United States) Josh Farley, illusionist
71	8	"2nd Chance Foolers"	August 5, 2019	608	1.24
(United States) **Marcus Eddie, close-up and card magician**; (United States) **Kevin Li, mentalist**; (United States) Blake Vogt & Jana, danger magicians; (Mexico) Robert Ramirez, close-up magicians
72	9	"Magic Meatballs"	August 19, 2019	609	1.25
(Austria) Anca & Lucca, mentalist duo; (Sweden) Tom Stone, illusionist; (United States) Jon & Owen (The Passing Zone), juggling magic duo; (Taiwan) Horret Wu, close-up/card magician
73	10	"Magical Moxie"	August 26, 2019	610	1.21
(Austria) Wolfgang Moser, illusionist; (United States) Johnny Magic, mentalist; (Spain) Pere Rafart, comedy magician; (Italy) Giacomo Bertini, coin magician
74	11	"The Mind Noodler"	September 9, 2019	611	1.14
(United States) Scott Green, comedy mentalist; (United States) Matt Donnelly: The Mind Noodler, comedy magician; (United States) **Doc Dixon, comedy magician**; (South Korea) Sangsoon Kim, close-up illusionist
75	12	"Magic is Bad for Your Health"	September 23, 2019	612	0.88
(Canada) Lucy Darling, stage magician (Carisa Hendrix); (France) **Nestor Hato, close-up/card magician**; (Spain) Alfonso Rituerto, coin magician; (United Kingdom) Keelan Leyser & Matt Daniel-Baker, illusionist duo
76	13	"Virtual Reality"	September 30, 2019	613	0.91
(Spain) Woody Aragon, close-up/card magician; (United States) Denny Corby, mentalist; (China) Sinbad Max, coin magician; (United States) **John Walton, mentalist**
77	–	"Merry Fool Us"	November 29, 2019	N/A	N/A
A special episode. All the performers received a special holiday themed participation trophy.: (United States) **Mat Franco, card magician**; (United States) Adam Trent, illusionist; (Israel) **Asi Wind, magician/mentalist**; (United Kingdom) Mark Shortland, magical comedy entertainer

=== Season 7 (2020–21) ===
No. overall	No. in season	Title	Original release date	Prod. code	U.S. viewers (millions)
**Part 1**
78	1	"Third Time's the Charm"	June 22, 2020	701	1.13
(Canada) Shawn Farquhar, (Note: Appeared in a previous episode where they fooled Penn & Teller.) close-up card magician; (Australia) **Helen Coghlan, escapologist**; (Czech Republic) **Ondřej Pšenička, card magician**; (United States) Paul Gertner, close-up card magician
79	2	"Teller vs. Penn"	June 29, 2020	702	1.02
(Canada) **Eric Leclerc, close-up magician**; (New Zealand) Dev Sherman, close-up/card magician; (China) Conan Liu, illusionist; (Spain) Rubén Vilagrand, comedy magician; (United States) **Penn Jillette, (Note: Fooled Teller and Piff the Magic Dragon.) juggler**
80	3	"Fool Us: The Home Game"	July 6, 2020	703	0.93
(United States) Caleb Wiles, card magician; (South Korea) D.K., close-up illusionist; (United States) **Wes Iseli, mentalist**; (Germany) Alana, illusionist; Teller builds a card castle while Penn and the Passing Zone juggle increasingly distracting/damaging objects.
81	4	"Teller Talks!!!"	July 13, 2020	704	0.94
(Canada) Miranda Allen, escapologist; (Argentina) Iñaki Zabaletta, close-up/card magician; (United States) **Keith Kong, mentalist**; (Brazil) Guilherme Silveira, mentalist; Penn and Teller provide a tutorial on the French Drop.
82	5	"Watermelon Surgery"	July 20, 2020	705	1.02
(Israel) Guy Bavli, mentalist; (Spain) **Javier Botía, mentalist**; (India) B.S. Reddy, illusionist; (United States) Chad Allen, close-up/card magician; Penn and Teller perform "Watermelon Surgery"
83	6	"P&T in 3D...Glasses"	August 3, 2020	706	0.90
(Netherlands) Hans Klok, illusionist; (Canada) Michael Bourada, mentalist; (Norway) Hedné, card magician; (Canada) Vincenzo Ravina, mentalist; Penn and Teller perform "Multiple Outs"
84	7	"Penn's Stupid Rope Trick"	August 17, 2020	707	0.96
(Japan) Sora, mentalist; (Germany) Jaana Felicitas, illusionist; (Spain) **Mario López, comedy illusionist**; (Canada) Clinton W. Gray, danger magician; Penn performs "Stupid"
85	8	"Brad Sherwood's Nuts"	August 24, 2020	708	1.01
(United States) Mike Hammer, comedy magician; (France) **Léa Kyle, quick change artist**; (Spain) Dante, close-up/card magician; (Japan) Takamiz Usui, close-up magician; Penn and Teller perform "Pull Your Cash Out" (torn and restored bill effect.)
86	9	"The Placebo Effect"	August 31, 2020	709	0.92
(Uruguay) Daniel K, close-up magician; (Japan) **Yukihiro Katayama, card manipulator**; (United States) Andrew Evans, illusionist; (France) David Stone, comedy magician; Penn and Teller perform "Placebo"
87	10	"Deep Fake Penn"	October 5, 2020	710	0.78
(France) **Boris Wild, close-up/card magician**; (Spain) Ramó & Alegría, illusionist duo; (Japan) Jonio, close-up magician; (United States) Ricardo Rosenkranz, danger magician; Penn and Teller perform "Cowboy"
88	11	"Say Hello to My Little Ball Pit Troll"	October 12, 2020	711	0.87
(Spain) **Jandro, comedy magician**; (United States) David Parr, danger magician; (United States) Magical Katrina, mentalist; (United States) Daniel Roy, close-up/card magician; Penn and Teller perform "Ball Pit Troll"
89	12	"Lord of the Ring"	October 19, 2020	712	0.85
(United Kingdom) Anna Ferris Simpson, mentalist; (Australia) Pierre Ulric, mentalist; (United States) **Garrett Thomas, close-up/card magician**; (United States) Francis Menotti, card magician; Penn and Teller perform "How We Met" (previously known as "Cuffed to a Creep")
90	13	"Jaws of Death"	October 26, 2020	713	0.85
(United States) Blaise Serra, close-up/card magician; (United States) Leon Etienne, danger magician; (France) **Xavier Mortimer, illusionist**; (Luxembourg) Sylvain Juzan, close-up magician; Penn performs "Correlation Sticks"
91	14	"Magic With a Property Brother"	November 16, 2020	714	0.79
(United Kingdom) Ali Cook, close-up magician; (United States) **Tony Clark, close-up magician**; (Germany) Till Haunschild, card magician; (Argentina) Tony Montana, mentalist; Penn and Teller perform "52 Squared" (card at any location with a set of 52 sheets of 56 cards each.)
**Part 2**
92	15	"Penn & Teller Go for the Juggler"	January 8, 2021	715	0.73
(United States) Noah Sonie, comedy magician; (Sweden) **Malin Nilsson, illusionist**; (United States) Peter Samelson, close-up/card magician; (United States) Michael Karl, mentalist
93	16	"Teller vs Penn: The Rematch"	January 15, 2021	716	0.76
(United States) Jonathan Burns, escapologist; (Taiwan) **Eric Chien, close-up magician**; (China) Jeremiah Zuo, card magician; (Netherlands) Sabine van Diemen, illusionist; **Teller**
94	17	"Jedi Mind Tricks"	January 22, 2021	717	0.75
(United States) **Chris Capehart, close-up magician**; (China) Yan Yan Ma, illusionist; (Germany) Topas, close-up magician; (United States) Jason and Stacy Alan, card magicians
95	18	"Teller Gets Smashed"	January 29, 2021	718	0.82
(South Korea) **Jeki Yoo, close-up magician**; (United Kingdom) Matthew Pomeroy & Natasha Lamb, mentalists; (United States) Peter K. Wood, Collector of the Impossible; (United Kingdom) Lewis Starnes, close-up magician
96	19	"Penn & Teller Go for a Spin"	February 5, 2021	719	0.83
(Spain) **Dania Diaz, close-up magician**; (United States) Greg Gleason, close-up/card magician; (United States) Cameron Braxton, card magician; (France) Florian Sainvet, illusionist/manipulator
97	20	"Niagara Fools"	February 19, 2021	720	0.68
(United States) Greg Frewin, escapologist; (United States) Dyna Staats, mentalist; (United States) Matt Marcy, comedy magician; (Brazil) Guilherme Silveira, mentalist
98	21	"Back to the Future"	February 26, 2021	721	0.76
(United States) Abby Segal, mentalist; (United Kingdom) **Noel Qualter, close-up and iPad magician**; (Germany) **Christoph Kuch, mentalist**; (United States) Ray Lum, illusionist/illusion fabricator
99	22	"P&T Get the Finger"	March 5, 2021	722	0.69
(United States) **Sanjeev Vinodh, card magician**; (United States) Doc Dixon, comedy magician; (United States) David Merlin, illusionist; (Germany) Jorg Alexander, close-up magician
100	23	"Turn That Frown Upside Down"	March 12, 2021	723	0.71
(United States) Tyler Twombly, close-up magician; (United Kingdom) Josephine Lee, stage magician; (Switzerland) **Lionel Dellberg, close-up magician**; (United States) Aaron Hickok, close-up/card magician
101	24	"The Magic Toilet"	March 19, 2021	724	0.80
(United States) Mac King, comedy magician; (United States) David Shareef, close-up/card magician; (Costa Rica) Alejandro Navas, card magician; (Canada) **Vitaly Beckman, illusionist**
102	25	"Penn & Tarot"	March 26, 2021	725	0.74
(Australia) **Simon Coronel, close-up magician**; (United Kingdom) **John Morton, mentalist**; (Italy) Alberto Giorgi, illusionist; (United States) Makoto Halverson, close-up/card magician
103	26	"Teller's Wonderland"	April 2, 2021	726	0.69
(Canada) Ryan and Johnny Hayashi, illusionists; (United States) Nathaniel Segal, mentalist; (Spain) **Jandro, comedy mentalist**; (United States) Bill Goodwin, card magician
104	27	"Magic R App"	April 9, 2021	727	0.72
(Germany) Moritz Mueller, card magician; (United States) Michael Feldman, illusionist; (United Kingdom) Magical Bones, close-up magician; (United States) **Seth Raphael, mentalist**
105	28	"Penn & Teller Double Down"	April 16, 2021	728	0.65
Penn & Teller and Gloria Estefan (Tattoo); (Ecuador) Siegfried Tieber, card magician; (United States) Rick Wilcox, close-up magician; (Germany) Willi Auerbach, illusionist

=== Season 8 (2021–22) ===
No. overall	No. in season	Title	Original release date	Prod. code	U.S. viewers (millions)
106	1	"Penn & Teller's Worst Nightmare"	October 1, 2021	803	0.67
(Spain) **Jandro, (Note: Appeared in a previous episode where they fooled Penn & Teller.) stage magician**; (United Kingdom) Piff the Magic Dragon, comedy magician; (Australia) **Helen Coghlan, escapologist**; (United States) Paul Gertner, close-up magician; Penn and Teller perform "Gorilla"
107	2	"Magic with a Wolf"	October 8, 2021	802	0.67
(United States) The Shocker, danger magician; (Germany) **Magic Maxl, close-up magician**; (South Korea) Jeki Yoo, close-up/card magician; (United States) Ben Seidman, mentalist; Penn and Teller perform "Spike Tape"
108	3	"Happy Birthday!"	October 15, 2021	801	0.74
(United States) **Amanda Nepo, close-up/card magician**; (Japan) Shoot Ogawa, close-up/coin magician; (Italy) Ale Bellotto & Giulia Musso, illusionists; (Canada) Mark Clearview, comedy magician; Penn and Teller perform "Birthday" (Zoom call magic routine)
109	4	"Monkeys, Donuts and X-Men"	October 22, 2021	806	0.65
(India) Anchal Kumawat, stage magician; (United States) **Mark Doetsch, close-up magician**; (United States) Michael O'Brien, close-up magician; (Spain) Adrián Carratalá, card magician; Penn and Teller perform "Donut"
110	5	"Teller Gets Whacked!"	November 5, 2021	804	0.67
(United States) **Alex Ramon**; (United States) Micah (Micah Cover); (Scotland) Cameron Young; (United States) Matthew Teague; Penn and Teller Perform "Whack-A-Teller"
111	6	"Penn & Tizzle"	November 12, 2021	805	0.65
(United States) Leroya Sanford; (United States) Joshua Jay; (Chile) **Gabriel Gascon**; (Italy) Luca Volpe
112	7	"Rock Paper Magic!"	November 19, 2021	807	0.69
(United States) Hayden Childress; (Norway) **Hans Petter Secker**; (United States) Benjamin Barnes; (United Kingdom) Jay & Joss; Penn and Teller perform "Camel"
113	8	"Magic Cubed"	December 3, 2021	808	0.73
(United States) Sydney Weaver; (United States) Steven Palmore; (United States) **Danny Ray**; (United States) Bobby Torkova
114	9	"Chocolate Magic"	January 7, 2022	809	0.89
(United States) Tori Noquez; (Canada) Alex Boyer; (United Kingdom) **Andi Gladwin**; (Germany) Topas, close-up magician
115	10	"The Penn-Tagram"	January 14, 2022	810	0.86
Mellow; Paige Thompson; **Stanley Zhou**; Jonathon Lachance
116	11	"Stabba Dabba Deck"	January 21, 2022	811	0.91
**Zak Mirz**; John-Henry; Andy Deemer; Thomas Solomon
117	12	"P&T's Super Bowl Halftime Show"	January 28, 2022	813	0.76
(United States) / (Lithuania) **Rick Smith Jr. & Rokas**; Lindsey Noel; Jason Suran; Roddy McGhie
118	13	"Penn on Fire"	February 25, 2022	812	0.76
John Fitzsimmons; **David Corsaro**; Diego & Elena; Bentley Burns
119	14	"Ghostbusters"	March 4, 2022	814	0.85
Sean-Paul & Juliana Fay; (Italy) Disguido, stage magicians; Scott Kahn; Star Newman

=== Season 9 (2022–23) ===
No. overall	No. in season	Title	Original release date	Prod. code	U.S. viewers (millions)
120	1	"Single-Handed Three-Legged Twin Bullet Catch"	October 14, 2022	901	0.55
Jon Mobley; **The Van Hargen Twins**; Axel Adler; Chris Canfield; Penn and Teller perform "Bucket of Blood"
121	2	"Sleight of Foot"	October 21, 2022	902	0.75
Theron Christensen; Jaana Felicitas; **Benjamin Barnes**; Brian Curry; Penn and Teller perform "Sleight of Foot"
122	3	"Four Fools and Counting..."	October 28, 2022	903	0.54
Yann Yuro; (Australia) **Helen Coghlan** (Note: Appeared in a previous episode); Jason Michaels; Alexander Boyce; Penn and Teller perform "Español"
123	4	"Alyson's Smart Ass"	November 4, 2022	904	0.81
(Spain) **Dani Daortiz, close-up card magician**; (United States) Knight & Gayle, spiritualist magician duo; (Canada) Jonah Babins & Ben Train, magician and mentalist; (United States) Jason Fields, parlor magician; Penn performs "Smart Ass"
124	5	"Teller and the Big Dummy"	November 11, 2022	905	0.64
Apollo Riego; Rachel Wax; (Hungary) **Kolos**; (United States) Peter Wood - Collector of the Impossible
125	6	"Magic Socks Big Time"	November 18, 2022	906	0.78
Gabriella Lester; Howard Blackwell; (Taiwan) **Horret Wu**; (United States) Michael Rubinstein
126	7	"That (Bleeping) Teller!"	December 2, 2022	907	0.72
Luka Vidovic; Connor McDonald & Kenshin Amagi; Marc Desouza; **Kevin Micoud**
127	8	"Penn & Teller Animal Style"	January 20, 2023	908	0.72
(Belgium) **Jo De Rijck, mentalist**; Nick Paul; Sachin KM; Christopher T & Sam the Doggo
128	9	"Tic Tac Time Travel"	January 27, 2023	909	0.73
Dustin Dean; **Alan Hudson**; Kruti Parekh; Kyle Purnell
129	10	"The Evil Magic Octopus"	February 3, 2023	910	0.69
Mr. Cuddles (Damien James) (Note: Appeared in a previous episode under a different name (Damien James)); Mantas Wizard; **Andy Gershenzon**; (Peru) **Alejandro Linian**
130	11	"Full Frontal Magic"	February 10, 2023	911	0.62
**Hector Mancha**; Adam Parisi; Ben Zabin; Robert Strong
131	12	"P & T Could Die Any Minute"	March 31, 2023	912	0.56
**Jandro**; Ben Kraatz; Judge Gary Brown; Puck
132	13	"Chicken Trickin"	April 7, 2023	913	0.62
Seren & Nathan; **Caleb Morgan**; (Spain) Alfonso Rituerto, coin magician; (United States) Ricardo Rosenkranz, Physician Magician
133	14	"Alyson Might Throw Up"	April 14, 2023	914	0.62
Raymi; (United Kingdom) Kat Hudson; (Spain) Javier Natera

=== Season 10 (2023–24) ===
No. overall	No. in season	Title	Original release date	Prod. code	U.S. viewers (millions)
134	1	"Who's Your Daddy?!"	October 27, 2023	1001	0.46
(USA) **Moxie Jillette, magician and Penn Jillette's progeny.**; (Taiwan) Daxien, illusionist; (USA) **The Cosmic Romantics, mentalist duo**; (USA) David Schwartz, close-up magician
135	2	"2 Dead in Tonight's Episode"	November 3, 2023	1002	0.65
(Canada) **Alexandra, close-up magician**; (Russia) Artem, illusionist; (USA) Anthony Dempsey, mentalist; (Norway) Rune Carlsen, coin magician; Penn juggles three different objects: a ping pong ball, apple, and bowling ball.
136	3	"Magic is Sexy"	November 10, 2023	1003	0.69
(USA) Cash, close-up/card magician; (Czech Republic) Aleš Hrdlička, illusionist; (Brazil) Henry & Klauss, escapologists; (Canada) Jonah Babins & Ben Train, magician and mentalist; Penn and Teller perform "Finding a needle in a haystack".
137	4	"We've Got a Racoon Problem"	November 17, 2023	1004	0.61
(Portugal) Solange Kardinaly, quick change artist; (Finland) **Christian Engblom, (Note: Appeared in a previous episode where they fooled Penn & Teller.) close-up/card magician**; (Spain) Antonio Martinez, illusionist; (USA) Ari Novick, mentalist; Penn and Teller perform "Gift Shop" (credit card to impossible location).
138	5	"The Bill-In-Penn's-Head Trick"	December 1, 2023	1005	0.55
(USA) **Joe Monti, street magician**; (China) Ding Yang, illusionist; (USA) Matt Baker, mentalist; (Chile) Arturo Fuenzalida, coin magician; Penn and Teller perform "The Bill-In-Penn's Head Trick" - reverse "Bill in Lemon" plot.
139	6	"Badass Brooke"	December 8, 2023	1006	0.61
(Spain) Ramo & Alegria, escapologists; (USA) **Bryan Saint, illusionist**; (South Korea) Sion, illusionist; (Sweden) Vilgot Michelin, close-up/card magician; Penn and Teller do not perform; Brooke Burke performs "Dental Floss through ear".
140	7	"The Princess and the Wizard"	December 22, 2023	1007	n/a
(USA) Benjamin Barnes, close-up/card magician; (Japan) Hara, illusionist; (Australia) **Helen Coghlan**, escapologist; (Uruguay) Daniel K, close-up magician; Penn and Teller perform Mark Wilson's original Sawing in Half Illusion (aka Allakazam Railroad - built by John Gaughan) Also; not only the second episode of the series to have two winners on same show. But, the first one to have them back-to-back!
141	8	"The Smallest Biggest Magic Trick Ever"	January 12, 2024	1008	0.68
(United States) Blake Vogt, close-up magician; (United States) Marc DeSouza, close-up magician; (United States) AnnaRose, hypnotist; (Spain) **Willy Monroe, illusionist**; Penn and Teller perform Pizza Prediction.
142	9	"Penn & Teller vs. A Magic Hamster"	January 19, 2024	1009	0.68
(Belgium) **Jo De Rijck, mentalist**; (Spain) Adrian Vega, comedy magician; (Japan) Nao Murata, illusionist; (USA) Jonathan Steigman, mentalist; Penn and Teller perform The Six Card Repeat.
143	10	"A Magical Punch in the Face"	January 26, 2024	1010	0.66
(China) Jeffrey Wang, coin magician; (United States) Sanjeev Vinodh, card magician; (Spain) **Miraver, illusionist**; (Denmark) Mortenn Christiansen, comedy magician; Penn and Teller perform Ring on Rose - transposition.
144	11	"The Youngest Act in Fool Us History"	February 2, 2024	1011	0.63
(United States) **Giancarlo Bernini, close-up magician**; (United States) Rachel Ling Gordon, illusionist; (France) Triton, comedy magician; (United States) Joe Diamond, close-up/card magician; Penn and Teller perform Paper Balls over the Head - with eggs.
145	12	"It's Snot Magic!"	February 16, 2024	1012	0.59
(United States) Jimmy Ichihana, close-up/card magician; (South Africa) **Brendon Peel & Li Lau, stunt magicians**; (South Korea) Jin Hyoung Han, illusionist; (United States) Dana Pleasant, close-up magician
146	13	"Game of Drones"	February 23, 2024	1013	0.64
(Canada) Wes Barker, illusionist; (Argentina) **Henry Evans, card magician**; (Spain) Gonzalo Albiñana, illusionist; (United Kingdom) Keona, mentalist; Penn and Teller perform a card stab with a drone.
147	14	"Brought To You by the Letter P"	March 1, 2024	1014	0.57
(Sweden) Jacob Schenström, illusionist; (Czech Republic) Ondřej Pšenička, card magician; (USA) John Lewit, comedy magician; (USA) **Chris Capehart, close-up magician**
148	15	"Dan Quayle Gets Shot by a T-Shirt Cannon"	March 15, 2024	1015	0.57
(South Korea) **Kimoon Do, card mechanic**; (USA) Matt The Mind Noodler, comedy magician (Matt Donnelly); (USA) Brielle, mentalist; (Peru) Bruno Tarnecci, illusionist
149	16	"Magicians Like to Spoon"	March 22, 2024	1016	0.69
(USA) **Ben Jackson, close-up magician** (determined during commercial break to have successfully fooled P&T.); (Spain) Juan Luis Rubiales, card magician; (Germany) Harry Keaton, hypnotist; (Japan) Shoot Ogawa, close-up/coin magician
150	17	"It Takes Balls to be a Magician"	March 29, 2024	1017	0.72
(Spain) **Javi Rufo, illusionist**; (USA) Emma Olson, mentalist; (USA) Sean Ridgeway, card magician; (USA) Jim Vines, close-up magician
151	18	"Shut Up - You Fooled Us!"	April 5, 2024	1018	0.51
(USA) Jason & Stacy Alan, mentalist duo; (France) **Markobi, comedy magician**; (Spain) **Luis Olmedo, illusionist**; (USA) Alyx Hilshey, street magician
152	19	"Magic is for the Birds"	April 19, 2024	1019	0.62
(United Kingdom) **Emily Robinson-Hardy, close-up/card magician**; (South Korea) C.Y., illusionist; (USA) Nick Diffatte, comedy magician; (Germany) Cody Stone, illusionist
153	20	"Now Teller Won't Shut Up"	April 26, 2024	1020	0.63
(Ireland) Nikola Arkane, illusionist; (Spain) **Rubi, comedy magician**; (United States) Vinny Grosso, comedy magician; (Spain) Gonzalo Mateos, close-up/card magician; Penn and Teller perform a magic trick where they spoof each other (requiring Teller to actually talk!). Also, first episode in the series to have two contending foolers from Spain in the same show.

=== Season 11 (2025) ===
No. overall	No. in season	Title	Original release date	Prod. code	U.S. viewers (millions)
154	1	"The Penn & Teller 50th Anniversary Special"	January 24, 2025	1112	0.65
(United Kingdom) Young & Strange, illusionist; (United Kingdom) / (Spain) **Piff the Magic Dragon with Jandro, comedy magicians**; (Italy) Piero Venesia; Penn and Teller perform "Entropy."
155	2	"A Magician Gives Brooke the Bird"	January 31, 2025	1101	0.60
(United States) Blake Vogt, close-up magician; (Argentina) **Hernán Maccagno**; (Ireland) Ella Nicholson; (Germany) Friedrich Roitzsch; Penn and Teller perform "Battle of Dreams" Also, first episode, this season to have a potential fooler from South America.
156	3	"Magic is in the Air"	February 7, 2025	1102	0.51
(United Kingdom) Magic Singh; (Germany) **Nikolai Striebel**; (United States) Dreygon; (Spain) Sara Rodriguez; Penn, Teller, Piff, and Brooke perform a packet trick.
157	4	"No More Mister Knife Guy"	February 14, 2025	1103	0.57
(Spain) **Juan Luis Rubiales, card magician**; (South Africa) Anja; (United Kingdom) Luke Osey; (Spain) Joshua Kenneth; Penn and Teller perform "Birthday Coincidence"
158	5	"Nerd Magic"	February 21, 2025	1104	0.59
(Italy) Francesco Della Bona; (United States) Liam Abner; (Scotland) **Tom Crosbie**; (Japan) Ben Daggers; Penn and Teller don't perform; Jandro does a card trick for Brooke.
159	6	"Burning Down the House"	February 28, 2025	1105	0.61
(Canada) Spencer Scurr; (Finland) Markus Tervo; (Spain) Adrián Vega, comedy magician; (Australia) Simone Turkington; Penn and Teller perform "Blue Kazoo"
160	7	"Penn Gets Shut Up"	March 7, 2025	1106	0.53
(United States) **Patrick Livingstone**; (Uruguay) Duo Hikmah; (Japan) Sho Takashige; (United States) Amanda Lindsey
161	8	"The Domino Effect"	March 14, 2025	1107	0.47
(Canada) Clark Payne; (United States) Rob Zabrecky, mentalist; (New Zealand) **Laser Kiwi, performance artists**; (United States) Peter Samelson, close-up/card magician
162	9	"House of Cards"	March 21, 2025	1108	0.49
(United States) Harry Gorillagician; (France) Nicholas Ribs; (United States) **Michael Dardant**; (United States) Shawn Preston
163	10	"Gotcha!"	March 28, 2025	1109	0.68
(Canada) **Vitaly Beckman, illusionist**; (United States) AnnaRose Einarsen; (Portugal) Gonçalo Gil; (United States) Ren X
164	11	"Penn and Teller Get Ducked"	April 4, 2025	1110	0.50
(United States) **John Michael Hinton**; (Taiwan) / (Canada) Billy Hsueh; (Israel) **Shimshi**; (Brazil) Bernardo Sedlacek; First episode, this season, to feature a father/daughter team from Israel as secondary foolers!
165	12	"The Eight Stooges"	April 11, 2025	1111	0.44
(USA) **Jack Kelly** mentalism/prediction; (Denmark) Mortenn Christiansen, comedy magician; (Canada) Robin Sheikh, balloon manipulation/prediction; (Spain) Magic Samk, Russian roulette with Spanish cutlery.
166	13	"The Eyes Have It"	October 10, 2025	1113	0.56
(Canada) Michael Pharoah; (Spain) **Xulio Merino**, (Note: Appeared in a previous episode where they fooled Penn & Teller.) close-up magician (who did not fool P&T this time.); (Germany) **Topas**, close-up magician; (Germany) Toby Rudolph
167	14	"Teller Gets a Talk Show"	October 17, 2025	1114	0.38
(United Kingdom) Hollie England; (Italy) **Giancarlo Scalia**, card magician; (United States) Francis Menotti, mentalist/card magician; (France) Gabriel Werlen, mentalist
168	15	"Waiter, There's a Confetti In My Magic"	October 24, 2025	1115	0.50
(Belgium) **Laurent Piron**; (Canada) Mark Clearview, comedy magician; (Canada) Glenn West; (United States) Abby Segal, mentalist
169	16	"The Psychic Gorilla"	October 31, 2025	1116	0.42
(Germany) **Jaana Felicitas & Nikolai Striebel**; (United States) Evan Northrup; (Germany) Marc Weide; (United Kingdom) Michael Vincent, close-up and stage magician
170	17	"I Now Pronounce You Magic and Wife"	November 7, 2025	1117	0.53
(Spain) **Paco Agrado**; (USA) The Cosmic Romantics, mentalist duo; (China) Kingsley Xu; (France) Damien Dubi
171	18	"It's Magic. Literally."	November 14, 2025	1118	0.50
(United States) Trigg Watson, close-up magician; (Israel) / (United States) Daniel Harel; (Netherlands) **Danny Urbanus**; (United States) Jon Mobley
172	19	"The Most Shocking and Bizarre Magic Trick Ever!"	November 21, 2025	1119	0.48
(USA) Shock & Bizzare; (Germany) **Alexander Krist**; (Belgium) Jo De Rijck, mentalist; (Japan) Gotaishi
173	20	"Can a Bison Buffalo Penn & Teller?"	December 5, 2025	1120	N/A
(Netherlands) Marco Grandia; (Luxembourg) **Sylvain Juzan**, close-up magician; (Germany) **Alexander Merk**; (United Kingdom) Keona, mentalist

== Reception ==
=== Critical reception ===
Readers of UKGameshows.com named it the second best new game show of 2011 in their "Hall of fame" poll.

In a November 26, 2019 essay, The New York Times Magazine gave Fool Us its "Letter of Recommendation," calling the show "an island of civility and generosity in our cruel, contentious and otherwise debased times."

=== U.S. ratings ===
==== Season 1 ====
Viewership and ratings per episode of Penn & Teller: Fool Us
No.	Title	Air date	Rating/share (18–49)	Viewers (millions)
1	"How to Saw a Woman in Half"	August 6, 2014	0.5/2	1.45
2	"Teller Sucks... Helium"	September 24, 2014	0.5/2	1.51
3	"Stab a Card, Any Card…"	July 30, 2014	0.5/2	1.75
4	"Solid Goldfish"	August 20, 2014	0.5/2	1.69
5	"Teller is a Blockhead"	September 3, 2014	0.7/2	2.07
6	"Penn Gets Nailed"	September 10, 2014	0.5/2	1.73
7	"The Magic of Polyester"	September 17, 2014	0.5/2	1.58
8	"A Bellyful of Needles"	August 13, 2014	0.5/2	1.68
9	"Water Tanks for the Memories"	August 27, 2014	0.5/2	1.59

==== Season 2 ====
Viewership and ratings per episode of Penn & Teller: Fool Us
No.	Title	Air date	Rating/share (18–49)	Viewers (millions)
1	"Phone-y Business"	July 6, 2015	0.5/2	1.66
2	"The Invisi-Ball Thread"	July 13, 2015	0.5/2	2.01
3	"Shoot to Kill"	July 20, 2015	0.5/2	1.81
4	"Knife of the Party"	July 27, 2015	0.6/3	2.24
5	"Mission Impossi-Ball"	August 3, 2015	0.5/2	2.06
6	"Now THAT'S Bunny!"	August 10, 2015	0.6/2	2.35
7	"Penn's Favorite Card Trick"	August 17, 2015	0.5/2	2.10
8	"Teller Plays with a Full Deck"	August 24, 2015	0.5/2	1.87
9	"Star Spangled Magic"	August 31, 2015	0.6/2	2.11
10	"Where There's Smoke There's Magic"	September 14, 2015	0.5/2	1.46
11	"Teller Deflowers a Shadow"	September 21, 2015	0.3/1	1.15
12	"Penn & Teller Ring Someone's Neck"	September 28, 2015	0.4/1	1.34
13	"An Egg-Cellent Trick"	October 5, 2015	0.4/1	1.36

==== Season 3 ====
Viewership and ratings per episode of Penn & Teller: Fool Us
No.	Title	Air date	Rating/share (18–49)	Viewers (millions)
1	"Won't Get Fooled Again...?"	July 13, 2016	0.4/2	1.46
2	"Jesse Eisenberg Gets Carded"	July 20, 2016	0.3/1	1.21
3	"Penn & Teller Have a Blast"	July 27, 2016	0.3/1	1.18
4	"Penn Plays with Fire"	August 3, 2016	0.4/2	1.42
5	"You Dirty Rathead!"	August 10, 2016	0.4/1	1.43
6	"Penn & Teller Snake their Chances"	August 17, 2016	0.3/1	1.47
7	"Juggle, Juggle, Penn's in Trouble"	August 24, 2016	0.4/2	1.49
8	"Here's Moxie!"	August 31, 2016	0.5/2	1.78
9	"The Great Escape"	September 2, 2016	0.3/1	1.28
10	"Tea Or Not To Tea"	September 7, 2016	0.4/1	1.54
11	"Penn & Teller Get Trapped"	September 9, 2016	0.3/1	1.41
12	"Penn & Teller Rip for Your Pleasure"	September 14, 2016	0.4/2	1.38
13	"Can Penn & Teller Fool Penn & Teller"	September 16, 2016	0.3/1	1.34

==== Season 4 ====
Viewership and ratings per episode of Penn & Teller: Fool Us
No.	Title	Air date	Rating/share (18–49)	Viewers (millions)
1	"Penn & Teller Teach You a Trick"	July 13, 2017	0.4/2	1.62
2	"Penn, Teller and a Mind Reading Chicken"	July 20, 2017	0.4/2	1.72
3	"Teller Flips a Bird"	July 27, 2017	0.4/2	1.56
4	"50/50 Chance"	August 3, 2017	0.4/2	1.64
5	"Does This Trick Ring a Bell?"	August 10, 2017	0.3/1	1.53
6	"Something Fishy This Way Comes"	August 17, 2017	0.4/2	1.49
7	"A Big Round of Applause for Alyson"	August 24, 2017	0.4/2	1.48
8	"I Dream of Genie Tube"	September 7, 2017	0.4/2	1.42
9	"Penn & Teller Are Full of Hot Air"	September 14, 2017	0.4/2	1.48
10	"Monkey Business"	September 21, 2017	0.4/2	1.55
11	"Penn Does the Heavy Lifting"	September 25, 2017	0.2/1	0.92
12	"Penn & Teller & Dracula"	September 28, 2017	0.4/2	1.66
13	"Hanging Out with Penn & Teller"	November 30, 2017	0.3/1	1.14

==== Season 5 ====
Viewership and ratings per episode of Penn & Teller: Fool Us
No.	Title	Air date	Rating/share (18–49)	Viewers (millions)
–	"April Fool Us Day"	April 2, 2018	0.3/1	0.94
1	"Penn the Magic Dragon"	June 25, 2018	0.3/1	1.35
2	"The Rematch"	July 2, 2018	0.3/1	1.34
3	"Penn & Teller Get Loopy"	July 9, 2018	0.3/1	1.29
4	"Here Comes the Magic"	July 16, 2018	0.3/1	1.39
5	"Psych!!"	July 23, 2018	0.3/1	1.45
6	"Penn & Teller Against the World"	July 30, 2018	0.3/1	1.38
7	"Imagine (Magic) Dragons"	August 6, 2018	0.3/1	1.31
8	"Here Lie Penn & Teller"	August 13, 2018	0.4/2	1.60
9	"Teller's Gambling Problem"	August 20, 2018	0.3/1	1.28
10	"Penn & Teller Keep You In Suspense"	August 27, 2018	0.4/2	1.62
11	"The Fool Us Zone"	September 3, 2018	0.3/1	1.34
12	"Never Trust A Magician"	September 24, 2018	0.2/1	0.89
13	"Let's Hear It For The Kids"	October 1, 2018	0.3/1	1.16

==== Season 6 ====
Viewership and ratings per episode of Penn & Teller: Fool Us
No.	Title	Air date	Rating/share (18–49)	Viewers (millions)
–	"April Fool Us Day 2019"	April 1, 2019	0.2	0.74
1	"David Copperfield vs. Penn & Teller"	June 17, 2019	0.3/1	1.31
2	"They’re Baaack!"	June 24, 2019	0.2/1	1.10
3	"Penn & Teller vs. Inventors"	July 1, 2019	0.2/1	1.14
4	"Penn & Teller Cure the Common Code"	July 8, 2019	0.2/1	1.15
5	"Penn & Teller Hit the Streets"	July 15, 2019	0.3/1	1.18
6	"Duck! It's Alyson!"	July 22, 2019	0.2/1	1.18
7	"Are You Better Magicians Than a 6th Grader?"	July 29, 2019	0.2/1	1.15
8	"2nd Chance Foolers"	August 5, 2019	0.2/1	1.24
9	"Magic Meatballs"	August 19, 2019	0.2/1	1.25
10	"Magical Moxie"	August 26, 2019	0.3/1	1.21
11	"The Mind Noodler"	September 9, 2019	0.2/1	1.14
12	"Magic is Bad for Your Health"	September 23, 2019	0.2/1	0.88
13	"Virtual Reality"	September 30, 2019	0.2/1	0.91

==== Season 7 ====
Viewership and ratings per episode of Penn & Teller: Fool Us
No.	Title	Air date	Rating/share (18–49)	Viewers (millions)
1	"Third Time's the Charm"	June 22, 2020	0.2	1.13
2	"Teller vs. Penn"	June 29, 2020	0.2	1.02
3	"Fool Us: The Home Game"	July 6, 2020	0.2	0.93
4	"Teller Talks!!!"	July 13, 2020	0.2	0.94
5	"Watermelon Surgery"	July 20, 2020	0.2	1.02
6	"P&T in 3D...Glasses"	August 3, 2020	0.2	0.90
7	"Penn's Stupid Rope Trick"	August 17, 2020	0.2	0.96
8	"Brad Sherwood's Nuts"	August 24, 2020	0.2	1.01
9	"The Placebo Effect"	August 31, 2020	0.2	0.92
10	"Deep Fake Penn"	October 5, 2020	0.1	0.78
11	"Say Hello to My Little Ball Pit Troll"	October 12, 2020	0.2	0.87
12	"Lord of the Ring"	October 19, 2020	0.2	0.85
13	"Jaws of Death"	October 26, 2020	0.2	0.85
14	"Magic With a Property Brother"	November 16, 2020	0.1	0.79
15	"Penn & Teller Go for the Juggler"	January 8, 2021	0.1	0.73
16	"Teller vs. Penn: The Rematch"	January 15, 2021	0.2	0.76
17	"Jedi Mind Tricks"	January 22, 2021	0.1	0.75
18	"Teller Gets Smashed"	January 29, 2021	0.1	0.82
19	"Penn & Teller Go For a Spin"	February 5, 2021	0.1	0.83
20	"Niagara Fools"	February 19, 2021	0.1	0.68
21	"Back to the Future"	February 26, 2021	0.1	0.76
22	"P&T Get the Finger"	March 5, 2021	0.1	0.69
23	"Turn That Frown Upside Down"	March 12, 2021	0.1	0.71
24	"The Magic Toilet"	March 19, 2021	0.1	0.80
25	"Penn & Tarot"	March 26, 2021	0.1	0.74
26	"Teller's Wonderland"	April 2, 2021	0.1	0.69
27	"Magic R App"	April 9, 2021	0.1	0.72
28	"Penn & Teller Double Down"	April 16, 2021	0.1	0.65

==== Season 8 ====
Viewership and ratings per episode of Penn & Teller: Fool Us
No.	Title	Air date	Rating/share (18–49)	Viewers (millions)	DVR (18–49)	DVR viewers (millions)	Total (18–49)	Total viewers (millions)
1	"Penn & Teller's Worst Nightmare"	October 1, 2021	0.1	0.67	TBD	TBD	TBD	TBD
2	"Magic with a Wolf"	October 8, 2021	0.1	0.67	TBD	TBD	TBD	TBD
3	"Happy Birthday!"	October 15, 2021	0.1	0.74	TBD	TBD	TBD	TBD
4	"Monkeys, Donuts and X-Men"	October 22, 2021	0.1	0.65	0.0	0.21	0.1	0.86
5	"Teller Gets Whacked!"	November 5, 2021	0.1	0.67	TBD	TBD	TBD	TBD
6	"Penn & Tizzle"	November 12, 2021	0.1	0.65	TBD	TBD	TBD	TBD
7	"Rock Paper Magic!"	November 19, 2021	0.1	0.69	0.0	0.20	0.1	0.89
8	"Magic Cubed"	December 3, 2021	0.1	0.73	0.0	0.15	0.1	0.89
9	"Chocolate Magic"	January 7, 2022	0.1	0.89	TBD	TBD	TBD	TBD
10	"The Penn-Tagram"	January 14, 2022	0.1	0.86	TBD	TBD	TBD	TBD
11	"Stabba Dabba Deck"	January 21, 2022	0.2	0.91	TBD	TBD	TBD	TBD
12	"P&T's Super Bowl Halftime Show"	January 28, 2022	0.1	0.76	TBD	TBD	TBD	TBD
13	"Penn on Fire"	February 25, 2022	0.1	0.76	TBD	TBD	TBD	TBD
14	"Ghostbusters"	March 4, 2022	0.1	0.85	TBD	TBD	TBD	TBD

==== Season 9 ====
Viewership and ratings per episode of Penn & Teller: Fool Us
No.	Title	Air date	Rating (18–49)	Viewers (millions)	DVR (18–49)	DVR viewers (millions)	Total (18–49)	Total viewers (millions)
1	"Single-Handed Three-Legged Twin Bullet Catch"	October 14, 2022	0.1	0.55	0.0	0.14	0.1	0.69
2	"Sleight of Foot"	October 21, 2022	0.1	0.75	0.0	0.12	0.1	0.87
3	"Four Fools and Counting..."	October 28, 2022	0.1	0.54	0.0	0.13	0.1	0.66
4	"Alyson's Smart Ass"	November 4, 2022	0.1	0.81	0.0	0.12	0.1	0.93
5	"Teller and the Big Dummy"	November 11, 2022	0.1	0.64	0.0	0.16	0.1	0.80
6	"Magic Socks Big Time"	November 18, 2022	0.1	0.78	TBD	TBD	TBD	TBD
7	"That (Bleeping) Teller"	December 2, 2022	0.1	0.72	TBD	TBD	TBD	TBD
8	"Penn Teller Animal Style"	January 20, 2023	0.1	0.72	0.0	0.15	0.1	0.87
9	"Tic Tac Time Travel"	January 27, 2023	0.1	0.73	TBD	TBD	TBD	TBD
10	"The Evil Magic Octopus"	February 3, 2023	0.1	0.69	TBD	TBD	TBD	TBD
11	"Full Frontal Magic"	February 10, 2023	0.1	0.62	TBD	TBD	TBD	TBD
12	"P & T Could Die Any Minute"	March 31, 2023	0.1	0.56	TBD	TBD	TBD	TBD
13	"Chicken Trickin"	April 7, 2023	0.1	0.62	TBD	TBD	TBD	TBD
14	"Alyson Might Throw Up"	April 14, 2023	0.1	0.62	TBD	TBD	TBD	TBD

==== Season 10 ====
Viewership and ratings per episode of Penn & Teller: Fool Us
No.	Title	Air date	Rating/share (18–49)	Viewers (millions)	DVR (18–49)	DVR viewers (millions)	Total (18–49)	Total viewers (millions)
1	"Who's Your Daddy?!"	October 27, 2023	0.1	0.46	TBD	TBD	TBD	TBD
2	"2 Dead in Tonight's Episode"	November 3, 2023	0.1	0.65	TBD	TBD	TBD	TBD
3	"Magic is Sexy"	November 10, 2023	0.1	0.69	TBD	TBD	TBD	TBD
4	"We've Got a Racoon Problem"	November 17, 2023	0.1	0.61	TBD	TBD	TBD	TBD
5	"The Bill-In-Penn's-Head Trick"	December 1, 2023	0.1	0.55	TBD	TBD	TBD	TBD
6	"Badass Brooke"	December 8, 2023	0.1	0.61	TBD	TBD	TBD	TBD
7	"The Princess and the Wizard"	December 22, 2023	—N/a	—N/a	TBD	TBD	TBD	TBD
8	"The Smallest Biggest Magic Trick Ever"	January 12, 2024	0.1	0.68	TBD	TBD	TBD	TBD
9	"Penn & Teller vs. A Magic Hamster"	January 19, 2024	0.1	0.68	TBD	TBD	TBD	TBD
10	"A Magical Punch in the Face"	January 26, 2024	0.1	0.66	TBD	TBD	TBD	TBD
11	"The Youngest Act in Fool Us History"	February 2, 2024	0.1	0.63	TBD	TBD	TBD	TBD
12	"It's Snot Magic!"	February 16, 2024	0.1	0.59	TBD	TBD	TBD	TBD
13	"Game of Drones"	February 23, 2024	0.1	0.64	TBD	TBD	TBD	TBD
14	"Brought To You by the Letter P"	March 1, 2024	0.1	0.57	TBD	TBD	TBD	TBD
15	"Dan Quayle Gets Shot by a T-Shirt Cannon"	March 15, 2024	0.1	0.57	TBD	TBD	TBD	TBD
16	"Magicians Like to Spoon"	March 22, 2024	0.1	0.69	TBD	TBD	TBD	TBD
17	"It Takes Balls to be a Magician"	March 29, 2024	0.1	0.72	TBD	TBD	TBD	TBD
18	"Shut Up - You Fooled Us!"	April 5, 2024	0.1	0.51	TBD	TBD	TBD	TBD
19	"Magic is for the Birds"	April 19, 2024	0.1	0.63	TBD	TBD	TBD	TBD
20	"Now Teller Won't Shut Up"	April 26, 2024	0.1	0.63	TBD	TBD	TBD	TBD

== Broadcast ==
In Australia, the show commenced airing on ABC1 each Saturday at 9:25 pm from October 1, 2011. In New Zealand, the show commenced airing on ChoiceTV each Saturday at 7:30 pm from April 28, 2012. The CW acquired the series for broadcast in the United States, where it premiered on July 30, 2014. The pilot episode was trimmed to one hour (including commercial breaks) for its CW airing. In Canada, the series aired on Bite TV before it was rebranded to Makeful on August 24, 2015. Channel 5 bought the UK rights to the second season and premiered it on March 6, 2016.

== Other versions ==
- In 2011 it was reported that the format had been sold to Ukraine broadcaster STB, who would produce a local version.
- In 2012 the show was licensed to Israel's Channel 2. The show was renamed Mi Yapil Et Ha Master ("Who Can Fool The Master?"). Penn & Teller were asked to be the judging magicians but they had to decline due to other commitments. Max Maven took their place, and the winner of the show was mentalist Eran Biderman.
