= Katrina Kroetch =

American entertainer

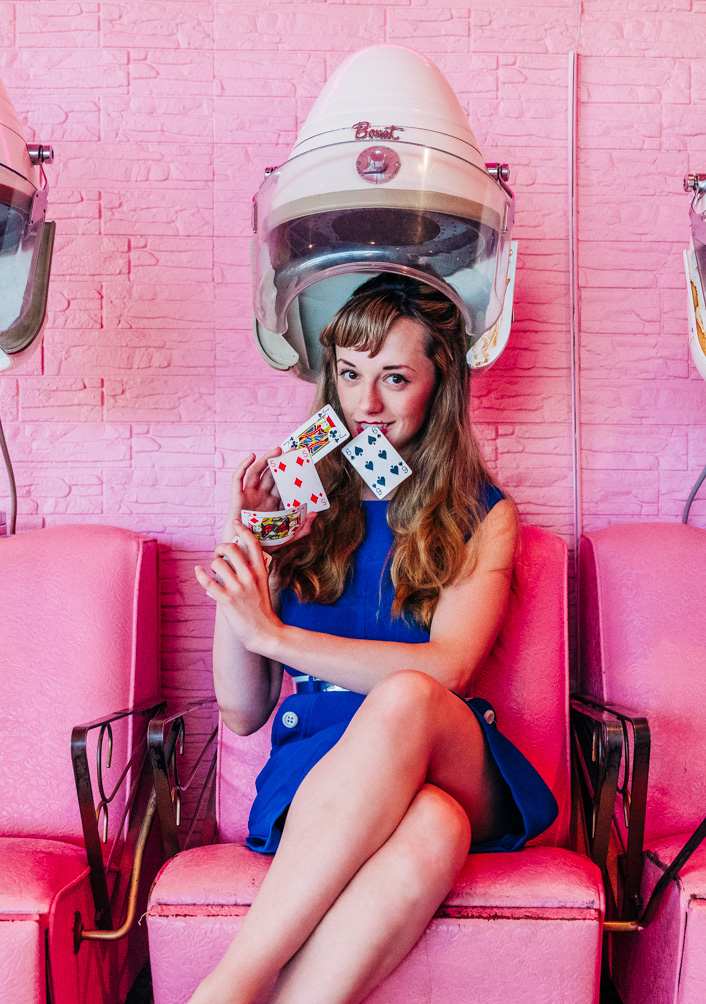
- Magical Katrina performing cardistry at the TWA Hotel
- Born: March 17, 1995 (age 30)
- Education: Circus Center
- Occupation(s): Magician, actor

Katrina Kroetch (born March 17, 1995) is an American entertainer specializing in magic performance and acting.

== Early life and education ==
Kroetch was born in Portland, Oregon. She participated in community theater, musical productions, and internships at local theater companies. At the age of 18, she attended the Clown Conservatory at the Circus Center in San Francisco, where she trained in physical comedy and circus arts.

== Career ==
After completing her training, Kroetch began performing at children's parties and moved to Los Angeles, incorporating magic into her act. Later, she developed her magic show and performed under the stage name Magical Katrina.

In 2017, Kroetch had a cameo acting role in the Netflix teen drama, 13 Reasons Why. In 2020, Kroetch performed on Penn & Teller: Fool Us and later on the television show Masters of Illusion. In the same year, she was named as the Children's Entertainer of the Year by the Pacific Coast Association of Magicians Magic Convention. During the COVID-19 pandemic, she produced online content and virtual magic performances.

In 2023, Kroetch worked on a magical music video with singer Chappell Roan. A year later, in 2024, she was featured on children's film and TV show Blippi.

Kroetch has performed internationally, including a tour in Mexico as a stage show Champions of Magic member. She has also participated in charitable performances with the nonprofit organization Magicians Without Borders in Africa and Brazil. She is also known for her roles in film and television series, including in 13 Reasons Why, I (Almost) Got Away with It, Wives with Knives, and Murder in the First.
