= Vinny Grosso =

American magician

Vinny Grosso is an American magician and author living in Las Vegas, Nevada.

In 2016, Grosso broke the world record for jumping barefoot on glass where he jumped 112 times in one minute.

The following two years, he appeared on television, first on America's Got Talent, where received all four yes votes from the judges, and second as a contestant on Penn & Teller: Fool Us where he fooled the duo. He returned to the show in 2024.

In February 2021, Grosso opened his own headlining show in Las Vegas titled Totally Mental.

== Publications ==
- Exposed and FEARLESS A Behind the Scenes Glimpse Into the Lives of Some Remarkable People (2016)
- Exposed and FEARLESS (2018)
