= Willi Auerbach =

German stage magician

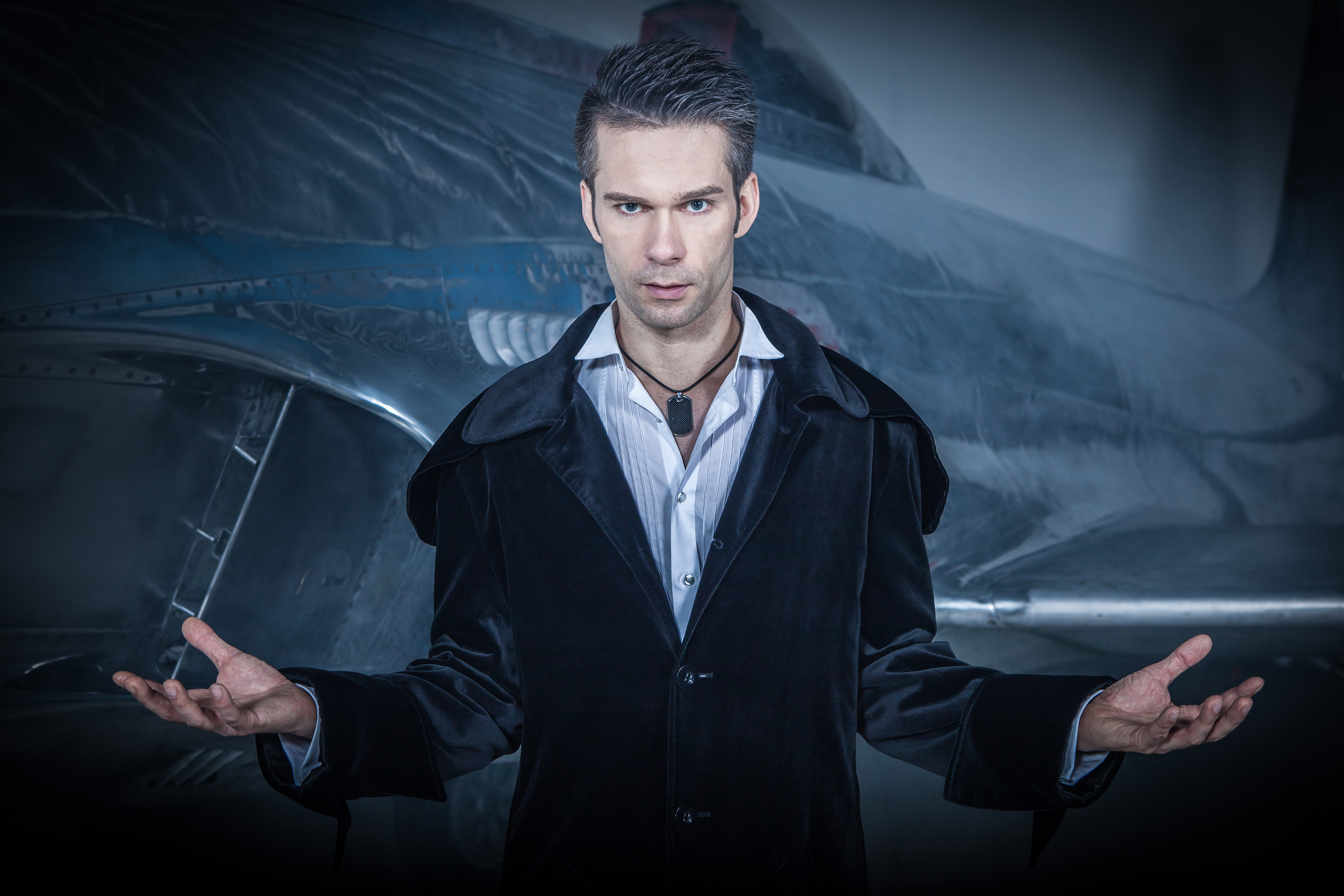
- Born: July 2, 1980 (age 44); Waldkirch, West Germany
- Other names: MAGIC MAN
- Occupation: Illusionist
- Website: www.magic-man-show.com

Willi Auerbach (born July 2, 1980, known professionally as MAGIC MAN) is a German stage illusionist, magician, and designer of magical illusions.

== Life ==
Auerbach was born and raised in Waldkirch, a town located in southwest Germany. At age 17 he first came into contact with magic. Soon after, he completed his industrial mechanic apprenticeship, followed by his media engineers studies (Dipl.-Ing. (FH)) at the university of Offenburg which he finished in 2009. Auerbach has since been working as a full-time magician. He is a member of Germany's Magic Circle since 2002.

== Career ==
One of Auerbach's most spectacular effects so far is the flying illusion, where he seemingly is able to overcome gravity and float freely through the air. His several TV appearances include "Tú Sí Que Vales" on Italian TV, "Penn & Teller: Fool Us" on The CW network, "Sag die Wahrheit" on SWR television, "Superhitparade der Volksmusik" with Caroline Reiber on ZDF and “Guten Abend RTL”, a news show in which he startled everyone with his prevision for the future for the Society for the Scientific Investigation of Parasciences (GWUP) under the supervision of Mark Benecke. In 2012, Auerbach hosted the finals of the Pangea mathematics competition at the House of World Cultures in Berlin for the television station Ebru TV. In May 2017, the magician became second at the German Magic Championships and in July 2018, he participated in the World Magic Championships in South Korea. According to Penn & Teller's: Fool Us Wikipedia page, Auerbach was featured on the 7th season of this show on April 16, 2021.

He also regularly organizes charity events for "Menschen für Menschen" (“Humans for Humans”), a charity organization helping Ethiopian people in need, which was originally founded by the now deceased actor Karlheinz Böhm. At a charity gala in June 2015, where amongst others, the Flying Steps were part of the performance show, 5,000 euros were donated to the foundation. In 2019 at the theatre of Freiburg 23,333 euros were collected. Over the years, the artist was able to collect tens of thousands euros for the charity. On the occasion of the organizations 30th anniversary, the MAGIC MAN even performed his show on site in Ethiopia. Those celebrations were not only attended by Almaz Böhm and Karlheinz Böhm, but also by Germany's former Federal President Horst Köhler, Addis Abeba's mayor Kuma Demeska and the Ethiopian world record runner Haile Gebrselassie. Auerbach has been an ambassador of the Ethiopian Aid program since September 2017.

In addition to his work as a magician, Auerbach is also an inventor and designer of magical illusions, apparatuses and theatrical special effects for other magicians.

== Television appearances ==
- Tú Sí Que Vales - Canale 5 2021
- Penn & Teller: Fool Us - The CW 2021
- "Sag die Wahrheit" - SWR television in 2019
- Carolin Reiber - ZDF television
- "Guten Abend RTL" - RTL (German TV channel)
- Presenter "Pangea-Mathematikwettbewerb" at Ebru TV
