= Romany, the Diva of Magic =

Romany, the Diva of Magic is a British magician. She was featured on the cover of The Linking Ring magazine in August 2007. She was mentored by magician and teacher Jeff McBride, who was quoted as calling Romany "a British Bette Midler."

== Life ==
Romany was born in London. Her parents encouraged her ambitions to be a performer by sending her to elocution, dance, and stage lessons. She went on to earn a BA Hons in English and Italian Literature. When she was 22, her family on her request changed her name to Romany.

== Career ==
After university, Romany was chosen as a graduate management fast track manager by BT. After four years in the office, she decided to change career. She studied magic and circus skills and performed on the street as the Cobble Comedy Company with German street performer Martin Kammann. After studying magic with Jeff McBride in Las Vegas she became a member of The Magic Circle. Romany has gone on to win awards such as the Magic Circle Stage Magician of the Year award, the Siegfried & Roy Gold Lion Award in Las Vegas, and the IBM Stage Magician of the Year. She is the first British person to win the Gold Lion Award. Time Out Magazine described her as "...a flamboyant hybrid of Bette Midler and Mary Poppins." She was chosen to perform for Queen Elizabeth II and her family at the queen's 80th birthday celebration. Romany now headlines with her own theatre show on luxury cruise ships and is in demand as a flamboyant 'Mistress of Ceremonies' around the world for large-scale celebrations and events. She performed at the Pink Ball in Dubai for 1,000 guests in 2013, and at the famous Blackpool Tower Ballroom in 2011 and 2012. In 2011, Romany appeared in the TV show Penn & Teller: Fool Us, where she performed a classic rope escape trick with assistance from host Jonathan Ross.
