= Reza Borchardt =

American magician

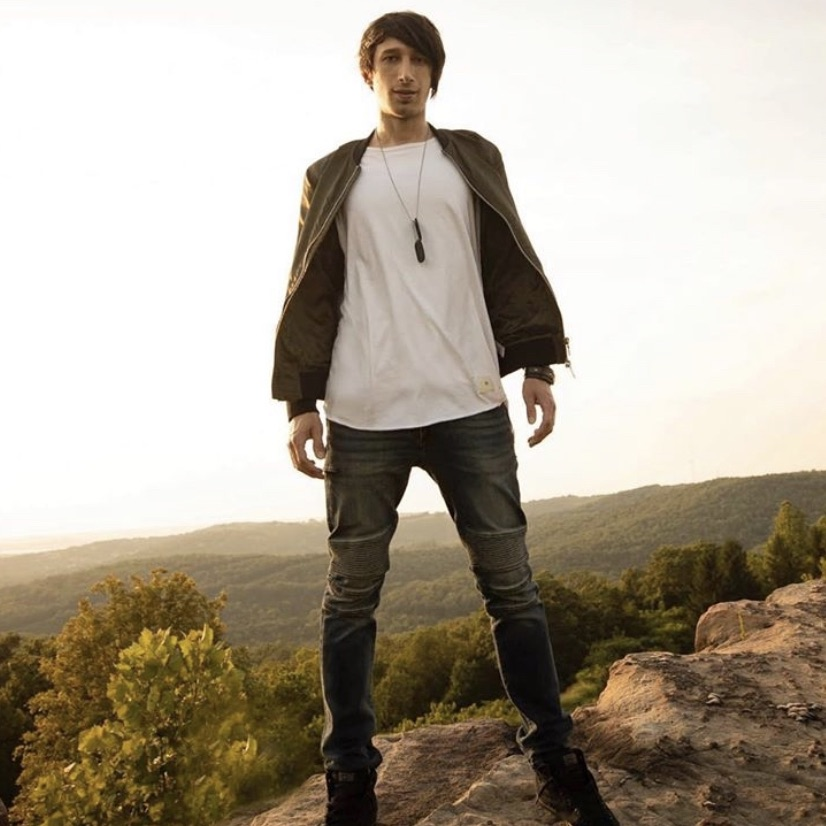
- Born: 1986/1987 (age 39–40); Brookings, South Dakota, US
- Occupation: Magician

Reza Borchardt (born 1986 or 1987), who goes by the mononymic stage name Reza Illusionist, is an American magician.

== Early life ==
Borchardt was raised in Brookings, South Dakota. His interest in magic began at the age of 6, when he saw a magic show at Hillcrest Elementary School in Brookings. At 7 years old, he asked for a magic kit for his birthday and put on performances at his school.

== Performances ==
One of Borchardt's earliest public performances took place when he was 14 years old at the University of Sioux Falls Jeschke Auditorium in a charity event known as the Calvacade of Magic, raising money for the Children's Home Society of South Dakota. Borchardt was one of eight local magicians to perform for this charity event, of which Borchardt featured two classic illusions: ZigZag and Temple of Benares. At 15 years old, Borchardt left Brookings for Branson, Missouri. Initially, he performed 18 shows per week for 6 weeks. Since that time, he has performed hundreds of shows in the town, and was voted Branson's Magician of the Year in 2016 and 2025.

In 2013, Borchardt announced 45 shows at the Mundo Imperial Forum in Acapulco, Mexico, He has been described as "the nation's top touring illusionist" and "one of the fastest rising young stars in the country" by the Brookings Register. From April 2014 until August 2015, Borchardt was a member of The Revollusionists, a spinoff show from The Illusionists, and in 2015, the Starlite Theater in Branson announced that Borchardt's show, Edge of Illusion, would be open from March until September 2016. Borchardt currently performs at Reza Live Theatre. In 2018, Borchardt performed on the television show Penn & Teller: Fool Us.

Borchardt tours the United States, redeveloping his show as he does so. He states that a lot of what he performs is inspired by music, movies and pop culture.

Borchardt has done a number of fundraisers for charity. In 2010, Borchardt partnered with the Brookings Red Cross chapter in order to stage a benefit show for the organization, and August 2015 he teamed up with the charitable organization Star of Hope to make Hunger Vanish, in a campaign to provide 640,000 school lunches for Haitian children.

In 2013, Borchardt appeared on MTV alongside Never Shout Never. In 2016, Borchardt appeared on a one-hour episode of the Japanese TV Show, Sekai No Hatte Madde Itte Q, and in 2017, Borchardt appeared on Duck Dynasty.

== Legal issues ==
In early 2025, two former employees of Borchardt's production "Reza – Edge of Illusion" filed a civil lawsuit against him in Taney County Circuit Court, Missouri. The plaintiffs, Katie Scarlett Van De Carr and Jayden L. Harris, alleged that Borchardt engaged in sexual misconduct and grooming toward them while they were 17-year-old minors in his employment. Borchardt's insurance company, State Farm, agreed in January 2025 to pay $3 million to Van De Carr and $2 million to Harris. Borchardt and his corporate co-defendants subsequently sought to condition payment on the plaintiffs signing non-disclosure agreements prohibiting them from speaking publicly about the matter. The plaintiffs declined and filed a breach of contract action when the agreed settlements went unpaid. The non-disclosure agreements sought by Borchardt were rendered unenforceable under Missouri's Trey's Law, a statute that prohibits NDAs in civil settlements involving childhood sexual abuse, which took effect in August 2025. A $5 million settlement was reached on August 1, 2025, five days before a scheduled court hearing.

In March 2026, Harris appeared at a Capitol Hill press conference alongside U.S. Senators Ted Cruz (R-TX) and Katie Britt (R-AL) to advocate for a federal version of Trey's Law. Harris publicly identified Borchardt as her abuser at the event, and stated that both Borchardt's representatives and her own attorney had pressured her to sign a lifetime NDA. She said Trey's Law "protected her voice" and was "essential to her healing."

Borchardt has denied the allegations. A statement from his representatives claimed that Borchardt volunteered for and passed a third-party polygraph examination pertaining to the allegations. The statement added that the civil case was resolved through a voluntary settlement with no admission of liability, prior to the enactment of Trey's Law, and that Borchardt was never criminally charged.
