= Mahdi Gilbert =

Canadian magician

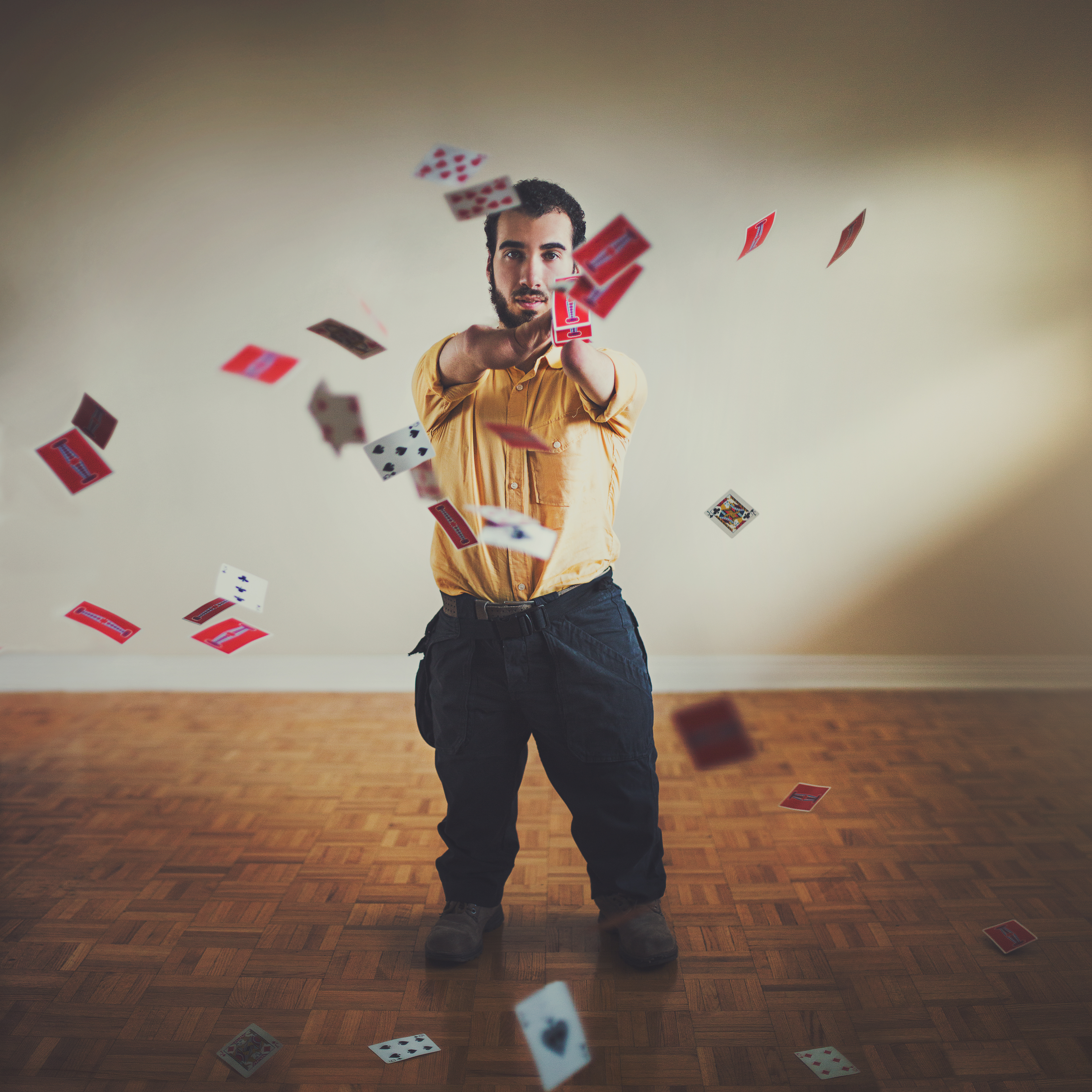
- Occupation: Magician
- Website: mahdigilbert.com

Mahdi Gilbert (born 1989) is a Canadian professional sleight of hand card magician.

== Early life ==
He was born without hands and feet and so had to individually create all of the techniques he employs in his illusions.

== Filmography ==
Gilbert appeared on the third season of Penn & Teller: Fool Us. He performed a version of the card trick Oil and Water, which fooled Penn Jillette and Teller, granting him a trip to Las Vegas to appear for the duo's opening act.

Gilbert appeared in the documentary Our Magic, created by R. Paul Wilson. He also contributed to the research of the book The Greatest German Living by Ricky Jay, which is about Matthias Buchinger, who was similarly born without hands or feet.

In 2018 Mahdi appeared on the BBC series The One Show.
