= Helen Coghlan =

Australian magician

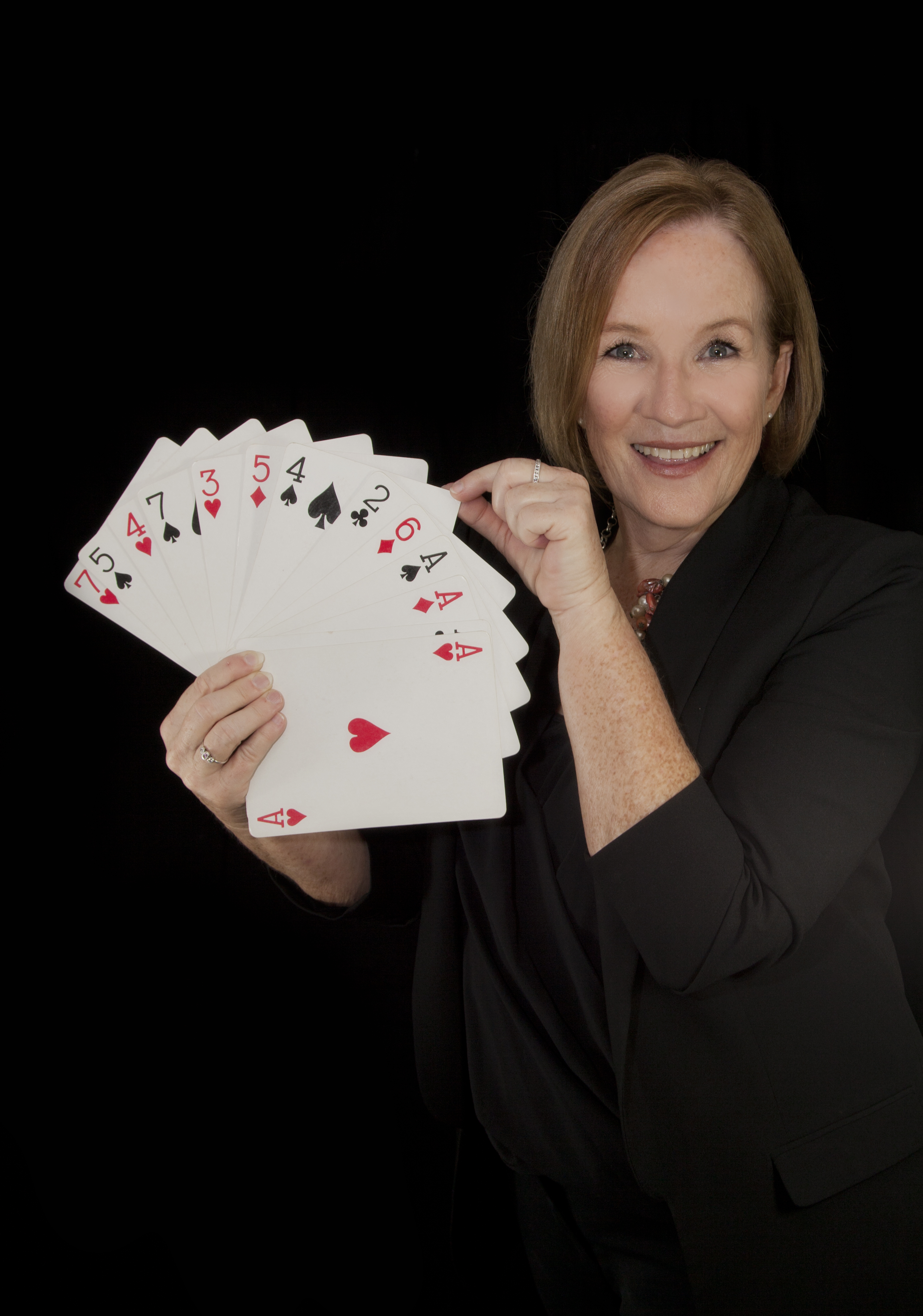
- Born: Southport, Queensland, Australia
- Occupation: Magician/Escapologist

Helen Coghlan is an Australian magician living on the Gold Coast, Queensland.

== Early life ==
Helen is the daughter of Australian escapologist and magician Arthur Coghlan.

== Professional life ==
Helen started working as a magician's assistant at the Magic Castle.

In 1987, she was the first woman in the world to complete the underwater act known as Houdini's Water Torture Escape, created by Harry Houdini.

Helen Coghlan performs illusions on the television program Penn and Teller: Fool Us, where she has appeared six times fooling the duo every time.
