= Gabriella Lester =

Canadian magician (born 2003)

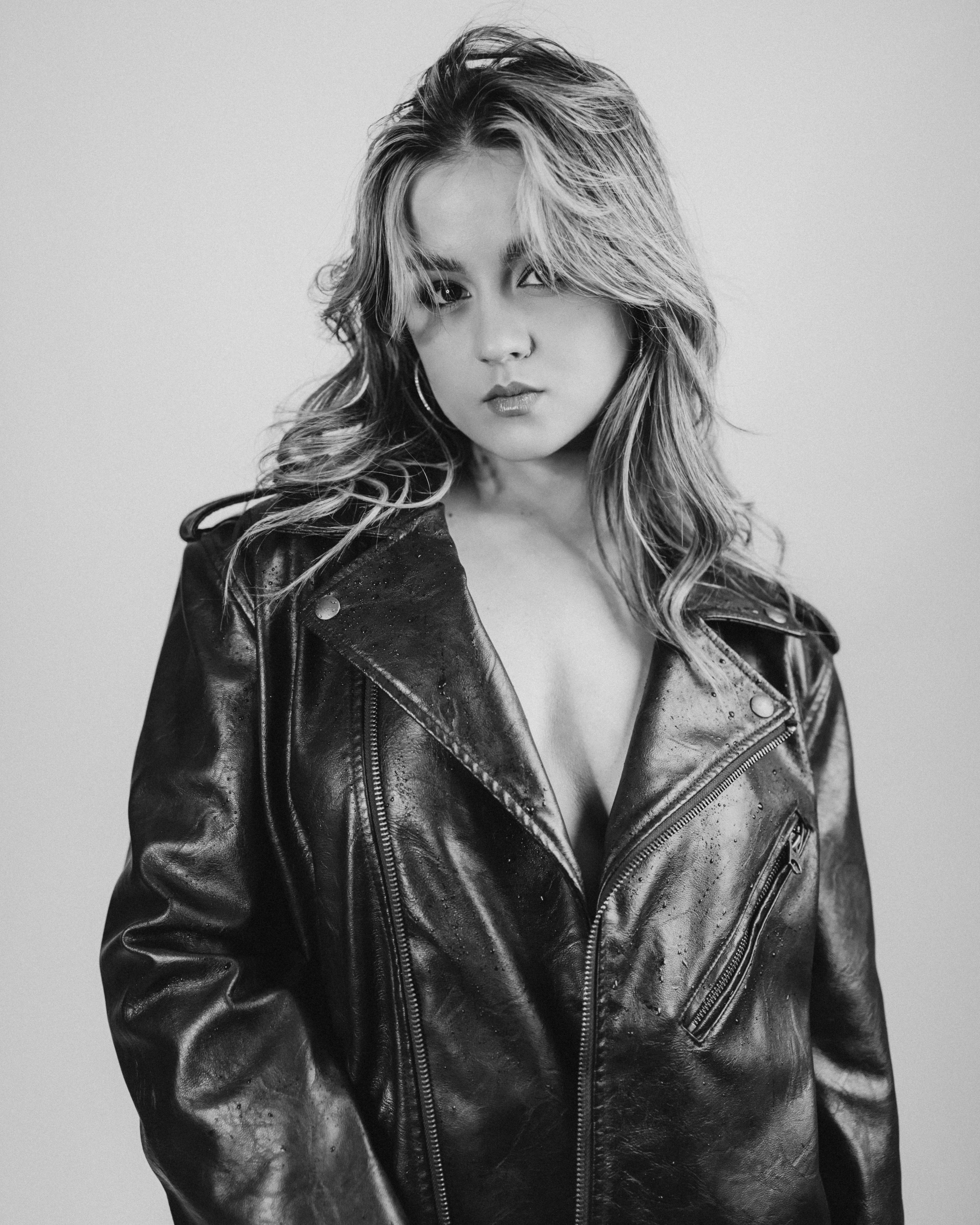
- Born: Gabriella Jaime Lester; December 10, 2003 (age 22); Johannesburg, South Africa
- Occupations: Magician; escapologist; television producer; consultant; actress
- Website: https://www.gabriellalester.ca/

Gabriella Jaime Lester (born December 10, 2003) is a South African-born Canadian magician, escapologist, television producer, and motorsports rider known for her daring escapes.

== Early life and career ==
Lester was born in Johannesburg, South Africa. In 2007, her family immigrated to Vancouver, British Columbia. At the age of ten, she met Canadian magician Shawn Farquhar who inspired her to pursue magic, and later became her mentor.

She did her first ever Vegas performance at the Hard Rock Hotel in Vegas at fourteen. Later that year, she became one of the youngest in history to perform Harry Houdini’s infamous upside-down straitjacket escape. In 2022, aged 18, she performed a version of it on American magicians Penn and Teller's hit show Fool Us. She is now an associate producer on the show. She was also seen on Michelle Khare’s series Challenge Accepted while training her to perform Houdini’s infamous Water Torture Cell.

She was a member of the Junior Society at the Academy of Magical Arts, which mentors young magicians between the ages of 13 and 20. She was also named Canadian Rising Star in 2024. She is now leading young magicians in Ring 1221 for the International Brotherhood of Magicians along with Geno Ploeger.

Starting in late 2025, Lester participated in the live show of the Now You See Me movies, along with other magicians from all over the world.

== Films/TV credits ==
- We Need a Little Christmas (2022)
- Penn and Teller: Fool Us : Season 9, Episode 6

== See also ==
- Shawn Farquhar
- Harry Houdini
- Penn and Teller
- Fool Us
- Michelle Khare
