= Benjamin Earl =

Benjamin Earl is a British magician, sleight-of-hand specialist, and illusionist. He appeared in the pilot episode of Penn & Teller: Fool Us and is one of eleven performers in the first season that "fooled" Penn and Teller in the episodes that went to air.

Earl starred in the mini-series Ben Earl: Trick Artist, which ran for 4 episodes on British public-service station Channel 4.
