= Peter K. Wood =

American magician (born 1984)

Peter Wood
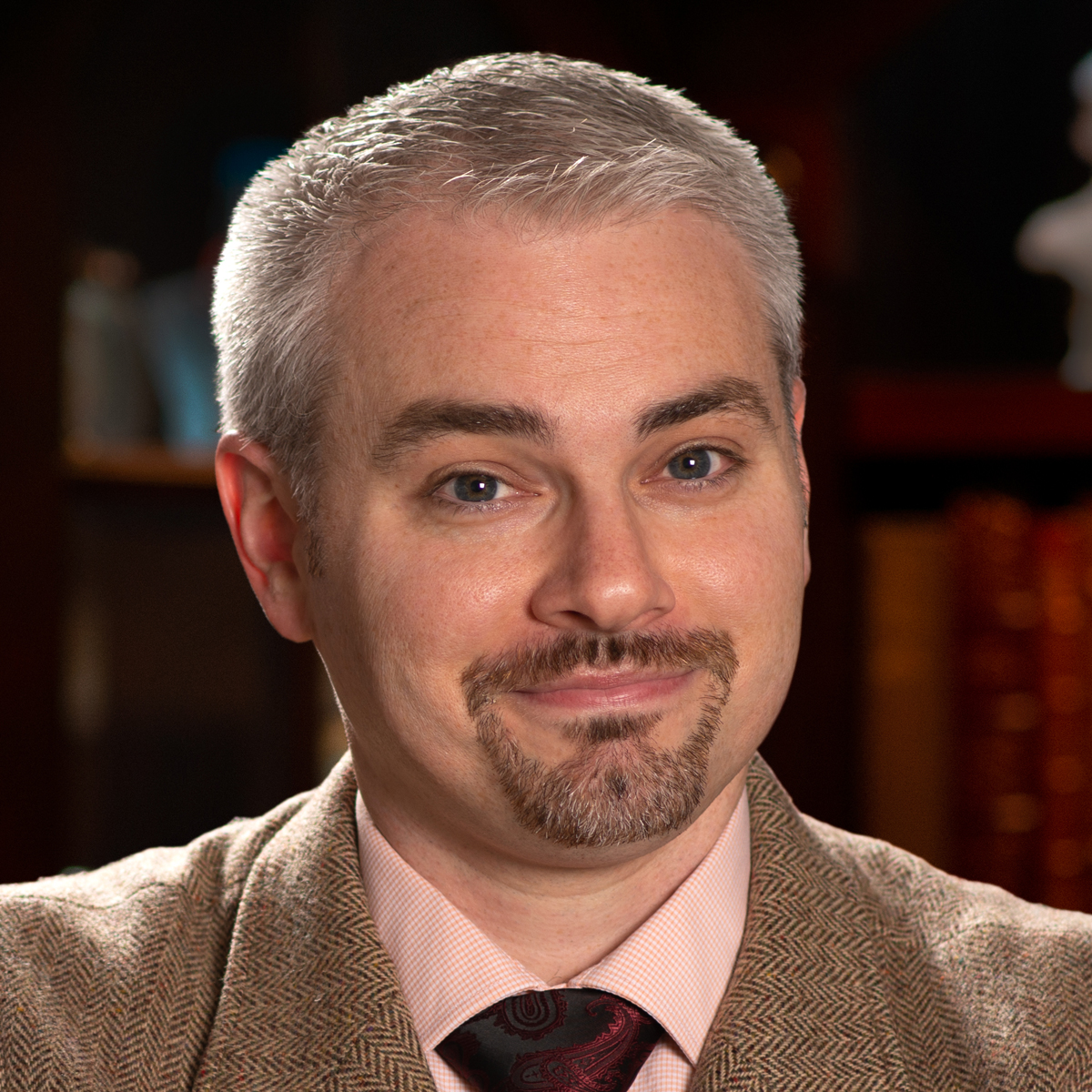
- Born: July 23, 1984 (age 42); Frederick, Maryland, United States
- Education: University of Maryland, Baltimore County UMBC
- Occupations: Magician, illusionist
- Known for: Impossible objects, Penn & Teller: Fool Us, special effects design
- Website: peterwood.com

Peter Kenneth Wood is a magician and "Collector of the Impossible" based in Maryland.

Peter began performing professionally in 1994. In 2003, his work with Immersion Active (an interactive design and marketing company in Frederick, Maryland) gained the attention of local media, and won him a Silver Addy Award from the Greater Frederick American Advertising Federation.

Peter, then assisted by his brother Matt, was profiled in a 2009 Frederick News-Post article, where Peter discusses his interest in magic as well as special effects. "'When I would play as a kid, it would usually involve setting up special effects in the backyard with a sprinkler and strobe light, or putting on a show in the basement with sound effects and lighting.'" Peter's childhood interest in special effects has led to his involvement behind the scenes of several films.

In 2010, Peter worked with the education department of the International Spy Museum to create an exclusive spy-themed magic show, "The Magic of Spying: Tradecraft Trickery." It premiered in April, 2011. Peter also appears in an interactive video exhibit, which premiered when the International Spy Museum moved to L'Enfant Plaza on May 12, 2019.

Peter Wood partnered with Technica.ly in 2014 for Baltimore Innovation Week. In October 2020, he was profiled in the Washington Business Journal for his virtual shows.

He has appeared twice on Penn & Teller: Fool Us on The CW Network, first on January 29, 2021 (Season 7, Episode 18) and later on November 11, 2022 (Season 9, Episode 5).

When not performing, Peter's specific skillset has led him to design and consult for film projects, theatrical productions, and his fellow performers. His work has appeared in several film festivals, and on stages in Sweden, Brunei, Las Vegas, New York, and at the Kennedy Center for the Performing Arts.

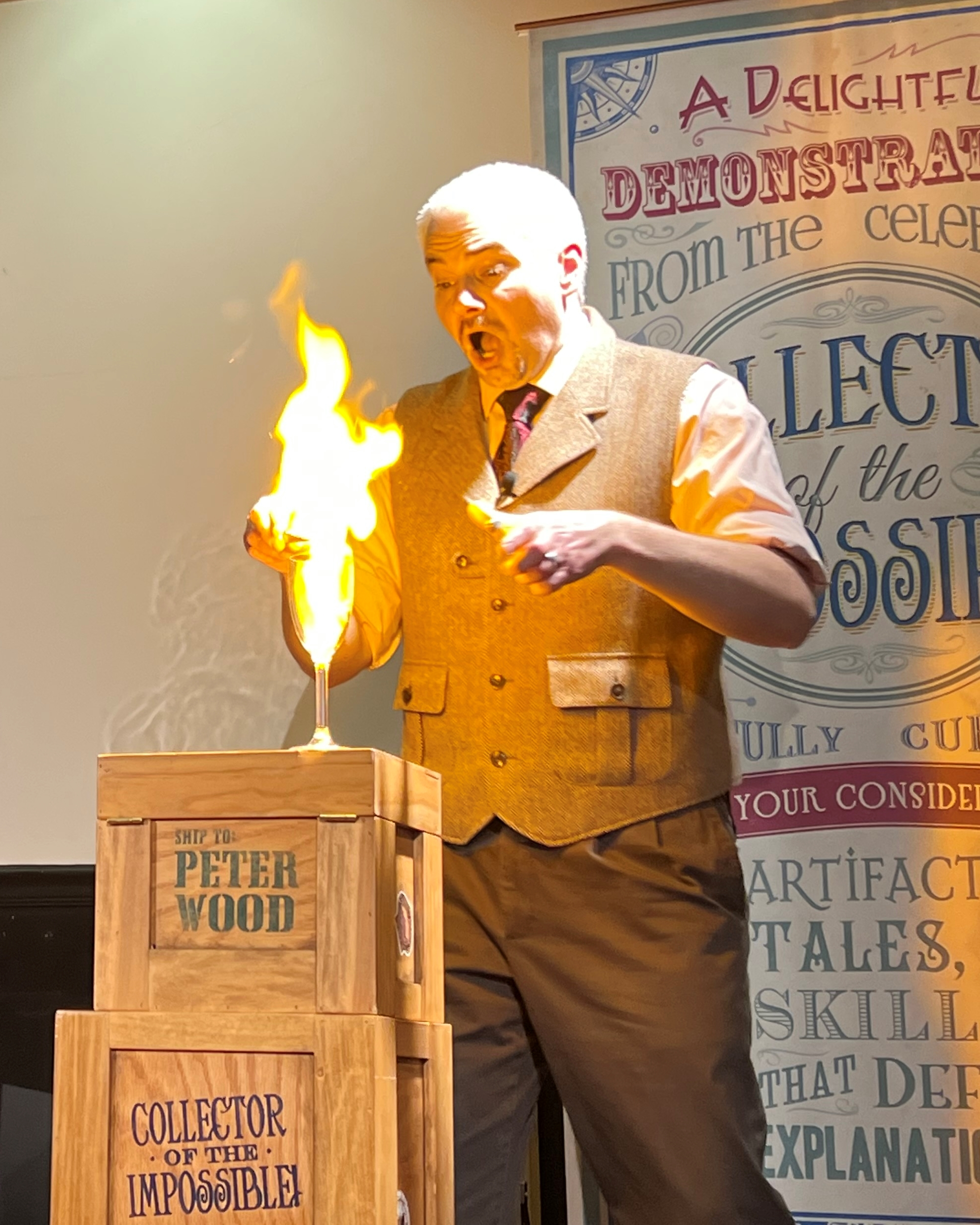
2022

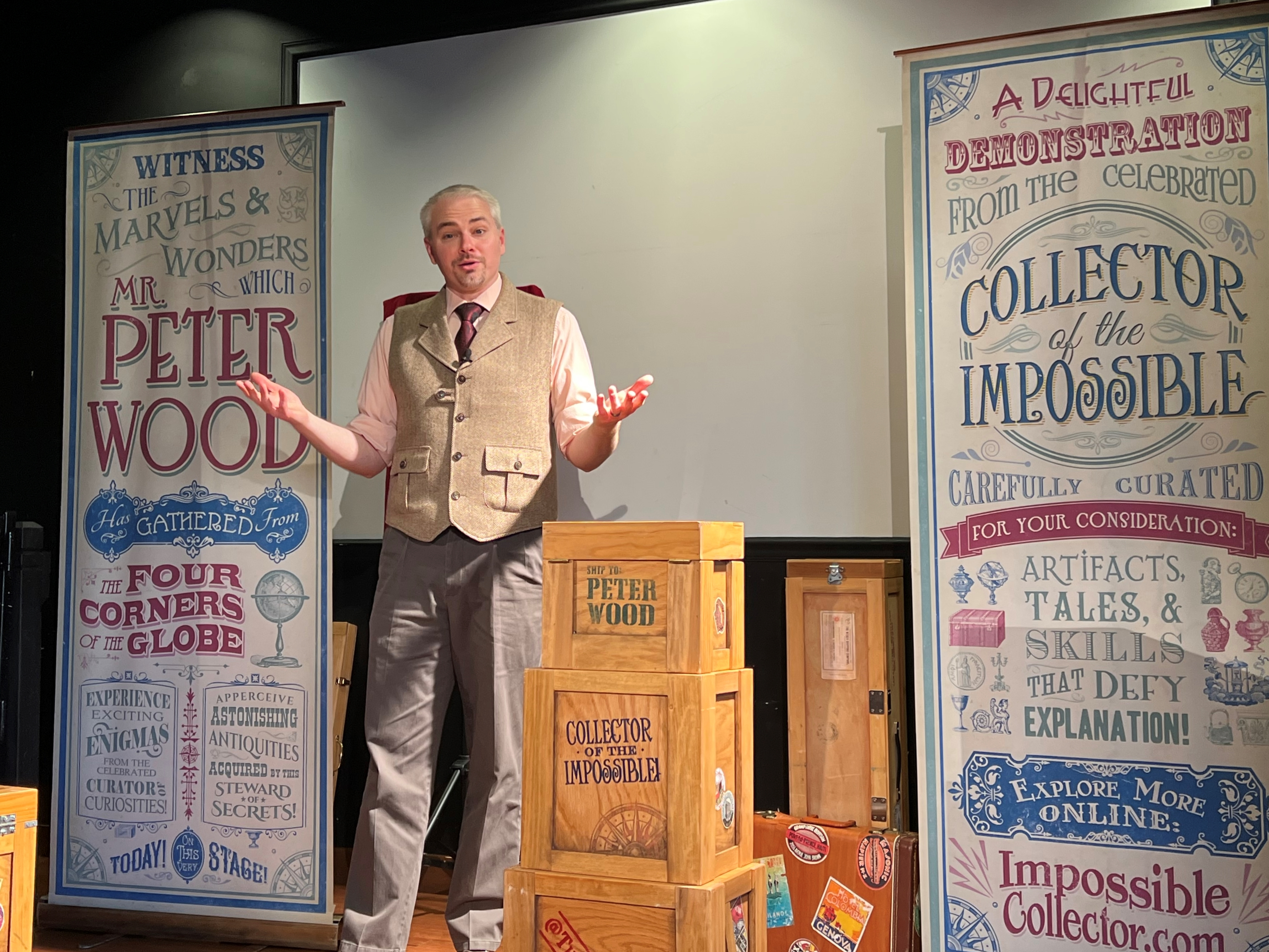
2022
