= Kostya Kimlat =

Ukrainian-American magician (born 1983)

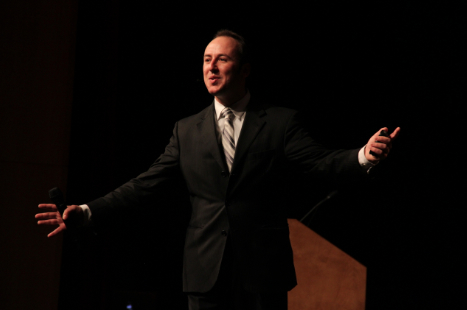
- Kimlat delivers his "Think Like a Magician" keynote
- Born: 1983 (age 42–43); Kiev, Ukrainian SSR, Soviet Union (now Kyiv, Ukraine)
- Occupations: Magician & Speaker
- Known for: Sleight of Hand Magic and Mentalism
- Television: Penn & Teller: Fool Us
- Website: kostyakimlat.com

Kostya Kimlat (born 1983) is a Ukrainian-American magician, motivational speaker, entrepreneur, and business consultant. With the use of magic tricks, Kimlat helps companies train employees. As a speaker, he lectures on the importance of perception in daily life through magic and sleight of hand.

In January 2006, Kimlat became the youngest magician to be featured in Magic Magazine. The cover story centered upon his technical skills and early business success.

In August 2015, Kimlat performed on the television show Penn & Teller: Fool Us, where an original card trick successfully fooled the magician duo Penn & Teller. He would appear again on Fool Us in 2018.

== Early life ==
Kimlat was born in Kiev, Ukrainian SSR, Soviet Union (now Kyiv, Ukraine) in 1983 to a Ukrainian family, and immigrated to Orlando, Florida with his parents, sister, and grandmother in 1992. His parents wanted a life away from communism and the lingering effects of the Chernobyl disaster, and a life in which the family's Judaism would no longer be called into question. Both of his parents, Irina and Boris, had earned master's degrees in engineering in the Soviet Union. Boris had received two such degrees and held multiple engineering patents. According to Kimlat, "... that didn't matter when we got here. So, they just started all over."

Kimlat first became interested in magic when he was 12 years old from watching The World's Greatest Magic on television. At age 14, he was regularly working in restaurants and at private events as a sleight-of-hand magician. By age 18, after graduating Winter Park High School, Kimlat had written his first book of magic and toured the United States lecturing to other magicians.

He attended the University of Central Florida, where he studied philosophy, psychology, and literature. Kimlat graduated with an honors degree, after completing a thesis on the connection between philosophy and magic.

== Business highlights ==
Kimlat is the CEO of Event Magic International LLC, which includes keynote speaking to business audiences, corporate entertainment, as well as sub-brands See Magic Live and Restaurant Magic Business.

=== Businesses ===
==== Motivational Speaker ====
Kimlat began delivering corporate keynote presentations in the early 2000s, combining magic performances with business messaging. He has spoken at events for organizations like NASA, GE, and NASCAR.

His speaking work centers on presentations that integrate magic principles with business concepts:

- “Think Like A Magician” - Examining how magicians influence perception and shape audience experiences, and teaching business professionals to apply these psychological principles to strengthen business relationships and communication.
- “Personality Magic” - Using playing cards as a framework to teach rapid personality assessment, based on how magicians quickly read and adapt to different audience members during performances.
- “Astonish Them” - Applying principles from magic performance to help businesses transform routine customer interactions into memorable experiences.

Discussing his approach to business communication, Kimlat stated, “The biggest lesson for businesses, or really, for anybody, is that you have the ability to influence people’s perception with your language, the way you walk, the way you talk, the way you present yourself. Everything we do creates perception. In order to avoid miscommunication and misperceptions, we have to be able to see things from our audience’s point of view, whether that audience is a client, a customer, a patient, a child, or a spouse.”

During the COVID-19 pandemic, Kimlat adapted these presentations to virtual formats, continuing to deliver keynotes through digital platforms. His company maintained both virtual and in-person speaking offerings after pandemic restrictions eased.

==== See Magic Live ====
Based in Orlando, Florida, See Magic Live is a company of magicians that performs for corporate events, non-profit galas, trade shows, and private celebrations throughout the country. They perform regularly for fans at Orlando Magic NBA games.

==== Restaurant Magic Business ====
Restaurant Magic Business places performing magicians in restaurants, consults restaurant operators, and also trains staff on customer service.

==== Virtual Magic Shows ====
Kimlat was among the early adopters in transitioning magic performances to virtual platforms during the COVID-19 pandemic. His company adapted its corporate entertainment services to a digital format during widespread lockdowns. Following the pandemic, Kimlat maintained both in-person and virtual magic performances as part of his corporate entertainment offerings.

=== Book ===
Think Like a Magician is the title of Kimlat's known keynote presentation and forthcoming book. Kimlat helps businesses drive relationship-based growth by using the lessons of magic to see things from another person’s perspective.

== Television appearances ==
Kimlat first appeared as a contestant on the 117th episode of Nickelodeon's Global Guts at the age of 12. He placed 2nd and won the silver medal for his country.

Kimlat appeared on Season 2 of Penn & Teller: Fool Us on The CW Network and fooled Penn & Teller. On the episode, Kimlat performed a card trick using an original method, which involved shuffling a deck face-up-into-face-down and then making all of the cards instantly face the same direction, except for Penn & Teller's selected cards. Penn, failing to understand how the trick worked, reacted with mock anger, lifting his stool over his head and throwing cards in Kimlat's face, while Teller reacted with delight, emitting audible giggles. Entertainment Weekly described Kimlat as the series' "best fool yet."

Penn highlighted Kimlat's performance on his podcast, Penn's Sunday School:

We did that exact trick on The Today Show. Teller and I know every method of doing that trick. We know it inside out. That was [Kimlat's] kind of 'oh well, that trick you did on The Today Show? I'm now gonna show you how it's done.' When Teller saw his name pop on the introduction ... I saw Teller just go, 'we've lost.' You know he's just that good. And when I finally found out how he did it, I was so much more amazed. I wanted to run up and tell people, 'do you know that he actually did this?' It's mind-blowing.

Kimlat returned to Penn & Teller: Fool Us in 2018. This time, he performed an effect in which he "dribbled," or cascaded a deck of cards from his hand down to the table. From the middle of the falling deck, he plucked out Penn's chosen card. The duo correctly guessed that Kimlat was not, in fact, performing a "trick," but displaying a talent of skill. Penn said, "We don't think there was a trick...We think you actually did what you said you were going to do..." In reference to not fooling Penn & Teller the second time, Kimlat said:

It was a huge compliment. I selected this trick, knowing that if they figured it out, they would essentially be acknowledging to the world the time and effort that went into it. This was the rare opportunity to have the method be acknowledged publicly and serve a greater purpose—to showcase to the public the work that goes into perfecting a magic effect.

After the "bust" Penn & Teller left their seats to shake Kimlat's hand on stage, an honor typically reserved for those magicians who fool them. While walking back to their judge seats, Penn told the audience, "He's better than you think, I'm telling you that."

== Community involvement ==
Kimlat's team of See Magic Live magicians regularly perform at Orlando-area non-profit fundraisers. His team has also taught magic summer camps and classes for the Dr. Phillips Center for the Performing Arts in Downtown Orlando.
