= Murray and Teresa Hatfield =

Murray and Teresa Hatfield are magicians from Victoria, British Columbia, Canada, having lived there since 2006. Murray Hatfield has performed as a solo performer in Germany, Israel, Cyprus, Mexico, North Pole and Japan. Teresa joined Murray in 1992 as a dancer and by 1995 had become his partner on stage. Together they have toured and performed in New Zealand, Australia, China, Singapore, United Kingdom and throughout North America.

They are the recipients of many major awards including the Canadian Association of Magicians 2005–2006 Canadian Magicians of the Year. In 1997, they were awarded the Pacific Coast Association of Magicians Silver Medal in the ProChallenge Competition. In 2009, the President of the International Brotherhood of Magicians, Joan Caesar, awarded them a Presidential Citation for their ongoing contributions to magic.

In 2006, Murray and Teresa purchased a magic shop located in Victoria. After seven years of being owned by Hatfield, the store, which has existed in one form or another since the 1970s, closed its doors for good on August 25, 2013.

In July 2017, the duo performed on the show Penn & Teller: Fool Us, but failed to fool the hosts.

For over 20 years they were the producers and stars of the largest touring magic show in Canada. The show, "Magic 'n Miracles", featured Murray and Teresa as well as guest performers. Through over two decades and thousands of shows, they helped to raise almost 20 million dollars for charities in Canada and the United States.

In 2016, Murray & Teresa produced and starred in one of the largest magic/illusion shows to appear at a Canadian fair or exhibition. "UNBELIEVABLE!...A Magical Experience" had a cast and crew of 29 magicians, dancers and stage and production crew and was seen by up to 10,000 people per night in the Pacific Coliseum. They were invited to return the following year with an entirely new version of UNBELIEVABLE.
