= Étienne Pradier =

French magician

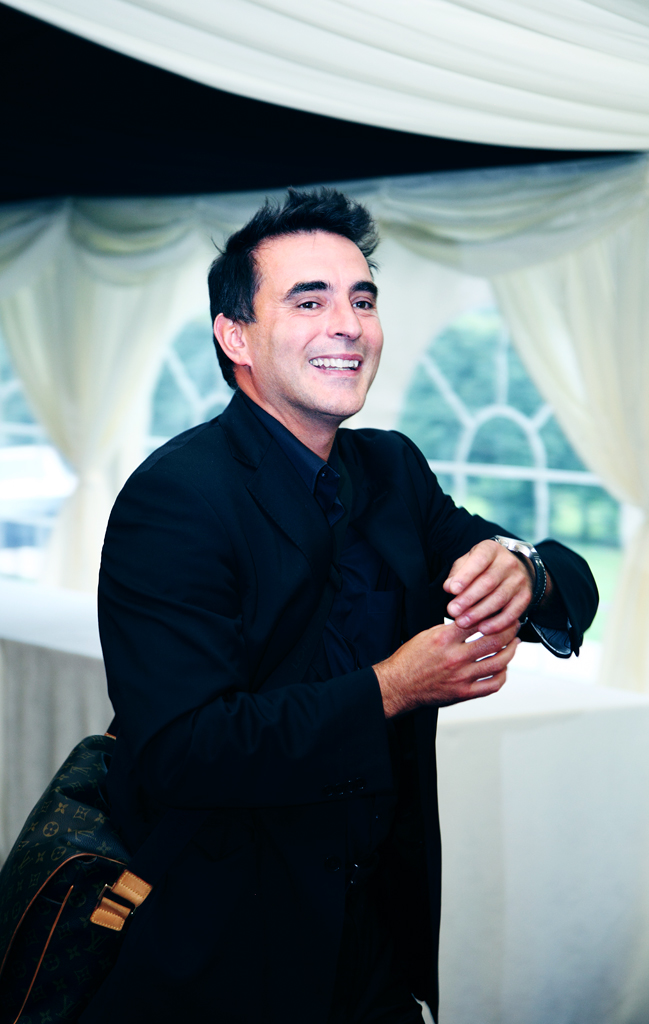
- Born: 13 January 1965 (age 61); Saint-Vallier, France
- Notable work: International Magician

Étienne Pradier (born 13 January 1965) is a French magician and is a member of the Magic Circle with Gold Star. He is a past winner of the Blackpool Magician's Club Close-up Magic Championships and was awarded third place in the Card Magic category in the FISM world championship.

== Early life ==
Étienne Pradier was born on 13 June 1965, in Saint-Vallier, Drôme, France. He is the eldest of Jean and Marinette (Isabelle and Nathalie in French) Pradier. He grew up in Saint-Uze, where his father ran a farm. After a three-year course in mechanical engineering, the young Etienne, aged 18, did not attend his final exam and left the South of France and mechanics to study fashion in Paris. A year later, he graduated from "Designer-model" to the model institute in Paris and received a contract with the Biscote Paris company, and after Z. Victory - Tara Jarmon. That's when he met Gerard Majax and David Copperfield in the famous store Mayette Magie Moderne. They introduced him to the art of magic. He then took lessons with the grandmaster Peter Édernac and continued to train after he left for England in 1991, when he moved to Eastbourne.

== Early career ==
Pradier began his career as a magician in Sussex, South East England, with the E&Clark Entertainment Company. First, he was the magician on board Ferries Dover-Calais for SeaFrance and aboard cruise ships bound for Singapore, Malaysia, etc.. 4 years after arriving in the UK, "the French man" was hired in the famous factory wheels Cammegh in Ashford where he worked for 5 years, combining this position with his personal magician business.

== Career ==
In 2000 Pradier resigned from his post at Cammegh and branched out on his own ventures. Therefore, everything is accelerating; he finished in the 3rd position as Close-Up Magician at the International magic convention; runner up in the United Kingdom and received the title of Magician of the Year by The Magic Circle, which he joined in 1997.

Two years later, he again took third place in the Ron MacMillan's competition and won the close-up magic category of the British Magical Championships at the Blackpool Magician's Club Convention. In 2003, in the Netherlands, where he took third place in the Card Magic category in the FISM, the most prestigious competition of Magic in the world. Some say that the "French man" came to the competition without his playing cards and borrowed a pack from another competitor before going on stage to pocket the bronze cup.

In the following weeks, Étienne Pradier was a guest on numerous television shows revealing magic secrets. Therefore, the Magic Circle started questioning Pradier's integrity. Internal tensions grew, so Pradier left the club in late 2003 but was reinstated the following year and given the Gold Star card. At the end of the decade, the reputation of Pradier rose, he launched his own brand of specialized products for magicians, and his own entertainment company: the Butterfly Trix Agency.

In 2011, Pradier appeared as a contestant on the British TV show Penn & Teller: Fool Us, where he managed to "fool" Penn & Teller, i.e. perform a trick that they could not explain.

== Butterfly Trix Agency ==
In 2007, Etienne Pradier founded the events company Butterfly Trix Agency, featuring a catalog of entertainment artists from all genres.

== Awards ==
=== 2000 ===
- Third position Close-Up at the International Magic Convention de Ron MacMillan
- Magic Circle Close-up Magician of the Year

=== 2002 ===
- Third position Close-Up at the International Magic Convention de Ron MacMillan
- Close-up winner at Blackpool Magician's Club Convention British Magical Championships

=== 2003 ===
- Third position in card magic at world championship FISM in La Haye

=== 2006 ===
- Winner at the Colombe d'or championship Antibes

== Bibliography ==
- French Bred Winners (2002)
- La Magie des Cartes (2009)
- Think of a card (2014)
- anthology in French (2017)

== Filmography ==
- Signed Card in Sealed Bottle (2003), DVD de sa célèbre routine de la carte signée dans la bouteille.
- The Professional repertoire of Etienne Pradier - French Magician (2006), Double DVD de ses plus grandes routines.
- French Bred Winners (2007)
- The True Story of Vincent Legrand (2016)

== Illusions ==
- Barking Dog
- Button Up
- Cozack Pen
- Bureau de change
- Resto
- Bottle Through Table

== Tricks that fooled Penn and Teller ==
- Face-down card
- Teleporting signed card in wallet,bottle and under the watch
