= Marc Bittar =

French magician

Markobi
- Born: Strasbourg
- Other names: Marc BITTAR
- Occupation: Magician
- Known for: Close-up magic. Card magic.
- Awards: 1st Prize in card magic, FISM World championship of Magic 2022 - Fool Us Trophy

Marc Bittar, better known by the stage name Markobi, is a French close-up/card magician. He won the world championship for magic in 2022 at the FISM World Championship of Magic convention in Quebec City, Canada. He is the second French person to have won the "queen" title, for card magic, since Jean-Jacques Sanvert in 1979.

Markobi's routines have a "messy and uncontrolled" style that are evocative of Lennart Green. Bittar has discussed his own style, saying "I like to create discrepancies, to cover the tracks. And if I can do it with a touch of humor, I do it."

He was a Golden Buzzer Winner in 2023 in France's Got Talent. In 2024 he appeared on the television show Fool Us with Penn & Teller and won the Fool Us trophy.
