= Michael Vincent (magician) =

British magician (born 1964)

- Born: 14 February 1964 (age 62)
- Occupation: Magician
- Years active: 1980–present
- Website: Michael Vincent Productions

Michael Vincent (born Michael Vincent Louis; 14 February 1964) is a British magician. He won The Magic Circle's Close-up Magician of the Year award three times (1983, 1991 and 2003).

== Biography ==
He first became interested in magic in 1970, after watching magicians David Nixon, Doug Henning, Fred Kaps and Slydini perform on television. He was later mentored by escapologist and magician Alan Alan and studied with Slydini for 4 days. In an interview with DMC, Michael is quoted as saying, "This happened over a four day period. Never saw him again." "In that week, it was a mixture of Dingle, time at Harry Lorayne's place, time with Slydini, time with Richard Kauffman."

In 2001 Vincent was hired by Scotland Yard to give a course to 20 top police chiefs involving the use of magic tricks to demonstrate communication skills. He performed at Hollywood's Magic Castle in 2003, and his television appearances have included, Jim'll Fix It, The Paul Daniels Magic Show, Test the Nation (BBC 1) and Heroes of Magic - A Century of Wonder (Channel 4)

In 2011 Vincent suffered from sudden overnight hearing loss leaving him partially deaf.
