= Jandro (magician) =

Spanish magician

Jandro (Born 1 April 1977 Valencia, Spain, full name Alejandro López García, height 1.76m) is a Spanish television personality and magician who has fooled Penn & Teller 6 times. He spent 15 years at El Hormiguero as a script coordinator, a magician, and creating short films, as well as writing comedy for celebrities like Taylor Swift and Will Smith. He is the presenter of Mapi on RTVE. He is the director, screenwriter, and executive producer of the short film "CAVA" (2024). His magic is heavily inspired by Juan Tamariz.

Jandro first appeared on Fool Us with a routine involving a freely selected card sealed inside a locked box protected by several layers of security. Penn & Teller deliberated only briefly before acknowledging that they had been fooled and awarding him the show's trophy.

On his second appearance, Jandro performed a routine in which a freely chosen card was predicted on LEGO embedded within a LEGO portrait of Teller. Penn & Teller quickly concluded that they had been fooled and presented Jandro with the trophy before the usual post-performance interview.

Jandro's third appearance, during the COVID-19 pandemic, involved a large-scale prediction effect. Penn and Teller were asked to select a number between 0 and 1,000, which had been sealed in an envelope. A domino effect subsequently revealed the chosen number. Penn & Teller were unable to determine the method and awarded him a third trophy.

His fourth appearance featured an elaborate vanishing illusion in daylight conditions, in which two model Statues of Liberty along with three people disappeared from a platform on an airport runway. The routine incorporated multiple witnesses and misdirection techniques. Penn & Teller opened an envelope provided by Jandro revealing the method and awarded him his fourth trophy.

During his fifth appearance, after assisting with several of Penn & Teller’s own routines for the season, Jandro performed a coin-selection effect in which both Penn and host Alyson Hannigan independently chose the same “lucky” coin from different containing otherwise different coins sets. The performance resulted in a fifth trophy.

In a sixth appearance, Jandro collaborated with Piff the Magic Dragon on Penn & Teller’s 50th anniversary special. The performance secured another Fool Us trophy.

== Television ==
| Year | Title | Channel | Role |
|---|---|---|---|
| 2006-2008 | Nada x aquí | Cuatro | Collaborator |
| 2005-2006 | Buenafuente | Antena 3 | Collaborator |
| 2006-2020 | El hormiguero | Cuatro / Antenna 3 | Collaborator |
| 2009 | Password | Cuatro / Antenna 3 | Collaborator |
| 2010 | Especial Nochevieja | TVE | Collaborator |
| 2013 | Camera Kids | Antena 3 | Presenter |
| 2016-2019 | Hipnotízame | Antena 3 | Presenter |
| 2022 | Mapi | TVE | Presenter |
| 2023 | Got Talent España | Telecinco | Guest judge |
| 2024-2025 | Festival Internacional del Humor | Caracol Television | Guest magician and comedian |
