= Andi Gladwin =

British magician, speaker, and publisher (born 1983)

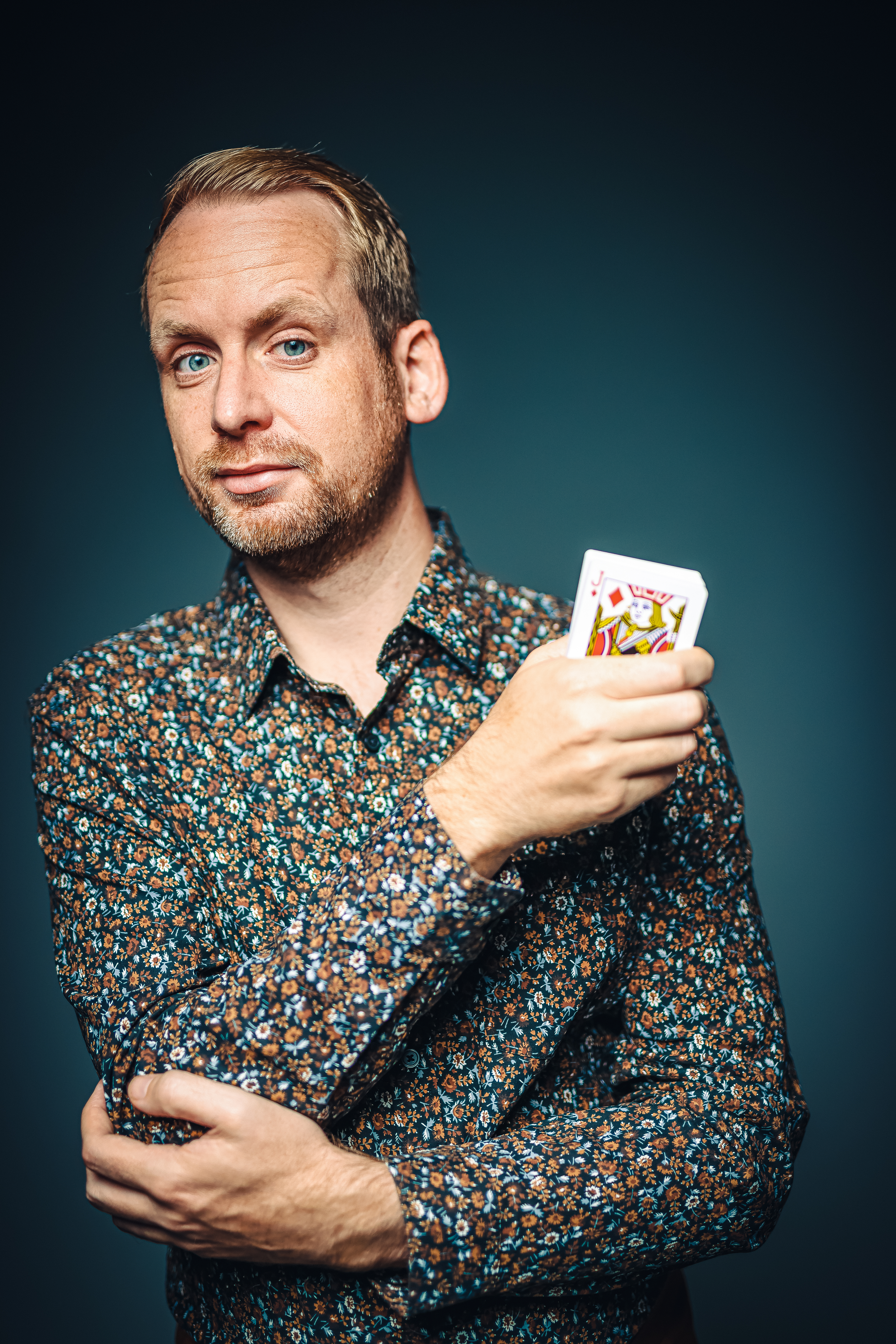
- Gladwin in 2020
- Born: 1983 (age 42–43); Newent, United Kingdom
- Occupation: Magician
- Known for: Magician and publisher / writer of books for magicians.
- Website: http://www.illusionist.co.uk/

Andi Gladwin (born May 10, 1983) is a British magician, speaker, and publisher. He is the subject of the 2026 documentary film Stealing Magic, about the theft and sale of magicians' secrets, which had its world premiere in the Spotlight Documentary section of the Tribeca Festival. He has appeared on television (ITV's Next Great Magician, Penn & Teller: Fool Us, The Big Breakfast, Lance Burton's Young Magician Showcase, Masters of Illusion, and more), has lectured for magicians throughout the UK, US, and Europe and written/published books on magic. Gladwin is a Member of the Inner Magic Circle with Gold Star and was granted the Maskelyne Literary Award.

== Biography ==
Gladwin was born and raised in Newent, Gloucestershire. When he was 10, he saw a number of stage illusionists while on holiday. He began to perform regularly from age 15. After working in IT for almost ten years, he became a professional close-up magician in January 2010.

Gladwin's TV engagements include performances on BBC1, BBC2, ITV1, Channel 4 (The Big Breakfast), The Young Magician's Showcase, Penn & Teller: Fool Us, and multiple seasons of Masters of Illusion.

In 2009, Gladwin started a publishing venture with magician Joshua Jay called Vanishing Inc. Magic.

In 2010, Gladwin released his work on the Double Lift and Second Deal called The Master Pushoff. Reviews included "Acquiring this skill will take work and practice, but the result is worth it. It will open up a new world of possibilities, and the DVD set is highly recommended. " —Matthew Field, The Magic Circular Magazine.

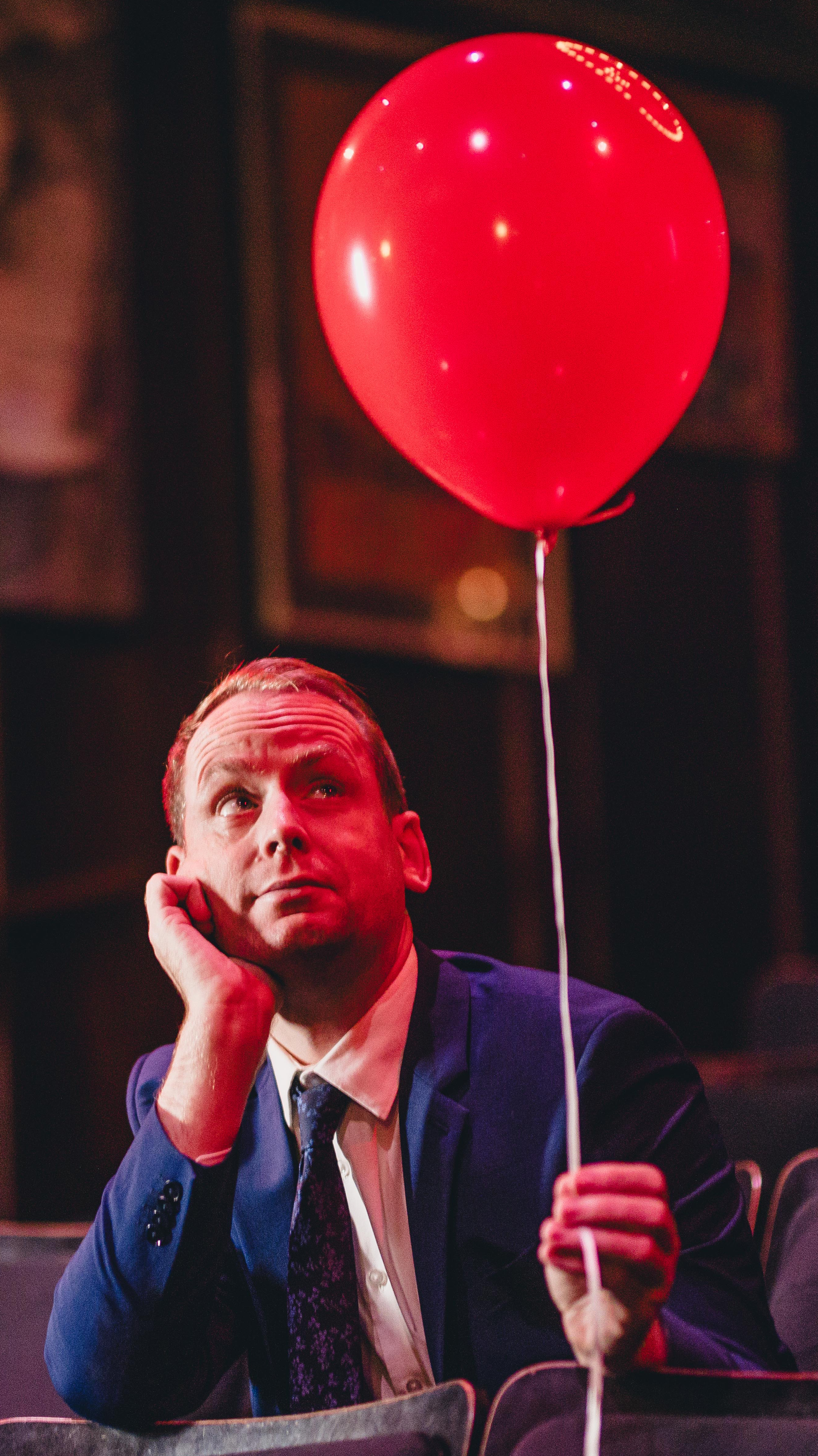
Gladwin with red ballon in 2024

Between 2014 - 2016, Gladwin was the "Magicana" columnist in Genii Magazine.

Perhaps Gladwin's most well-known trick is to perform a magic trick from inside of a large red balloon, apparently only using his head. In 2016 he was a performer on ITV1's The Next Great Magician where this trick was featured. He also performed it on Penn & Teller: Fool Us; his performance from that show was featured in The New York Times.

In 2023, Gladwin launched a show in Chicago titled "Shuffled". In the show, audience members are asked to bring their own deck of cards, and Andi improvises an 80-minute show with them. The show was directed by Lea Hinz and Carisa Hendrix, the performer behind Lucy Darling and ran for three month-long runs. It also ran for a month at Liberty Magic in Pittsburgh where Gladwin was reviewed as "the epitome of warmth".

In 2026, Gladwin appeared as himself in Stealing Magic, a feature documentary film directed by Matthew Testa, which world premieres in the Spotlight Documentary programme of the Tribeca Festival. The festival programme describes the film as following Gladwin leading a team of illusionists investigating the theft of magicians' secrets sold on illicit websites. The documentary was also featured at the 2026 DC/DOX, 2026 American Film Institute Festival at the Hollywood Chinese Theater, Yellow Springs Film Festival, and Sun Valley Film Festival in Idaho. Rolling Stone reviewed it as "ne of the best films of this year’s Tribeca Film Festival".

== TV appearances ==
- The Big Breakfast
- Fox Network's Lance Burton's Young Magician's Showcase
- Next Great Magician
- Penn & Teller: Fool Us
- Masters of Illusion

== Film ==
- Stealing Magic (2026) – as himself (documentary subject)

== Awards ==
- The John Nevil Maskelyne Prize (2012)
- The Academy of Magical Arts Literary Fellowship

== Published works ==
While Andi has published many books through his Vanishing Inc. Magic brand, he has authored the following:

- The Magician's Ltd Cookbook (2007)
- Movers & Shakers (with Tyler Wilson) (2007)
- Jack Parker's 52 Memories (2008)
- The Definitive Sankey (Volumes 1 - 3, with Joshua Jay, 2013)
- Blomberg Laboratories (2015)
- 52 Memories (retrospective edition, 2016)
- Going Pro (2017)
- Dynamo: Book Of Secrets (2017) with Dynamo and Joshua Jay
- The Card Magic of Edward G. Brown (2018)
- Pure Imagination (2019)
- The Boy Who Cried Magic (2020)
