= Rune Klan =

Danish comedian and magician

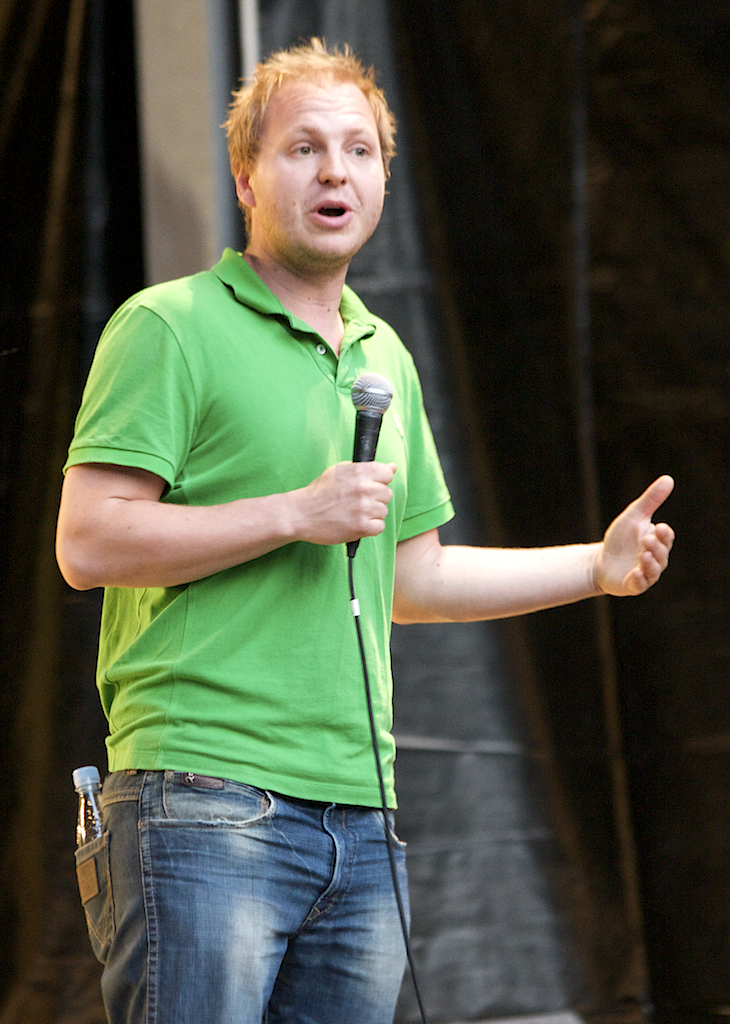
- Born: 15 October 1976 (age 48); Silkeborg, Denmark

Rune Klan (born 15 October 1976 in Silkeborg) is a Danish comedian and magician. He has released an instructional video for magicians called Three Pieces of Silver. Klan has lived in the Middle East and in Canada and has toured in the U.S. where he has taught other magicians. In 2008 he was awarded the Tribini Prize by Bakken, for "his extraordinary ability to combine stand-up comedy with magic (...) and has managed to renew traditional entertainment, and also being able to convey it to the younger generation".

Klan and Mick Øgendahl have together made the show Tak for i aften and Tak for i aften on Tour.

Klan had a show called Hokus Fucking Pokus, which was broadcast on Danish TV, on Channel 5 in 2009.

In 2009, Klan hosted the show "Zulu Award".

Klan has toured Denmark with "Det Røde Show", "Rune Klan Går Large", "Det Blå Show" and "Det Stribede Show". All of which displayed his unique combination of magic and stand-up comedy.

== Trilogies ==
Rune Klan's 3 first one-man shows: "Rune Klan l tre-i-en", "Rune Klan Går Large" and "Det Blå Show" each have three different colour themes. Red, green and blue. These three publications together form a trilogy that deals with RGB colours.

"Det Stribede Show' is the latest of Rune's new trilogy. "Det Stribede Show" was a national success and was released on DVD in 2014. The show featured a new live musical element by the South African musician "Daniel Rosenfeldt" to complement Rune's magic.

Based on previous statements from Rune in various interviews in 2013, in connection with The Stribede Show Rune mentions that this show is the start of a new trilogy, where the following 2 shows, respectively, will be called "Polka Dot Show" and "The Checkered Show"

== Filmography ==
- 1998 Three pieces of silver (trylleundervisning)
- 2008 Kung Fu Panda (lægger stemme til Po)
- 2011 Kung Fu Panda 2 (lægger stemme til Po)

=== Standup ===
- 2000 Talegaver til børn
- 2001 Talegaver til børn
- 2002 Den ægte vare (standupshow)
- 2002 Talegaver til børn
- 2003 Rune Klan l tre-i-en (standup-/trylleshow)
- 2003 Talegaver til børn
- 2004 Talegaver til børn
- 2007 Rune Klan Går Large (standup-/trylleshow)
- 2009 Comedy Aid
- 2010 Det Blå Show (standup-/trylleshow)
- 2012 Rune Klan & Friends (standup-/trylleshow)
- 2012 Rune Klan Boxen (tre-i-en, går large og det blå show samlet i en box, Runes første trilogi)
- 2013 Det stribede show (standup-/trylleshow)
- 2014 Det stribede show (Stand-up og tryl)

=== TV ===
- 2001 Get Ahead (deltager i 3. afsnit)
- 2002 Perforama (sitcom med Anders Matthesen i hovedrollen)
- 2004 TarTar (10 episoder på TV 2)
- 2007 Tak for i aften (8 episoder på TV2 Zulu)
- 2008 Tak For I Aften On Tour (10 episoder på TV2 Zulu)
- 2009 Hokus Fucking Pokus (9 episoder på Kanal 5)
- 2009 Rune Klan's Trylleshow (TV 5)
- 2013 Tomgang (TV-serie som Theis)
- 2014 Den gale hare (TV-program på TV3)
- 2014 Den skæve verden ( quiz program på DR3)

=== Theatre ===
- 2006 Peer Gynt (skrakostykke på Betty Nansen Teatret)
- 2008 Biblen (skrako på Nørrebro Teater)
- 2011 Oliver Med Et Twist (teaterstykke på Nørrebro Teater)

== Bibliography ==
Author Joshua Jay wrote Rune's World, published by Vanishing Inc. Magic in April 2010.
