= Lea Hinz =

German aerial performer and director (born 1989)

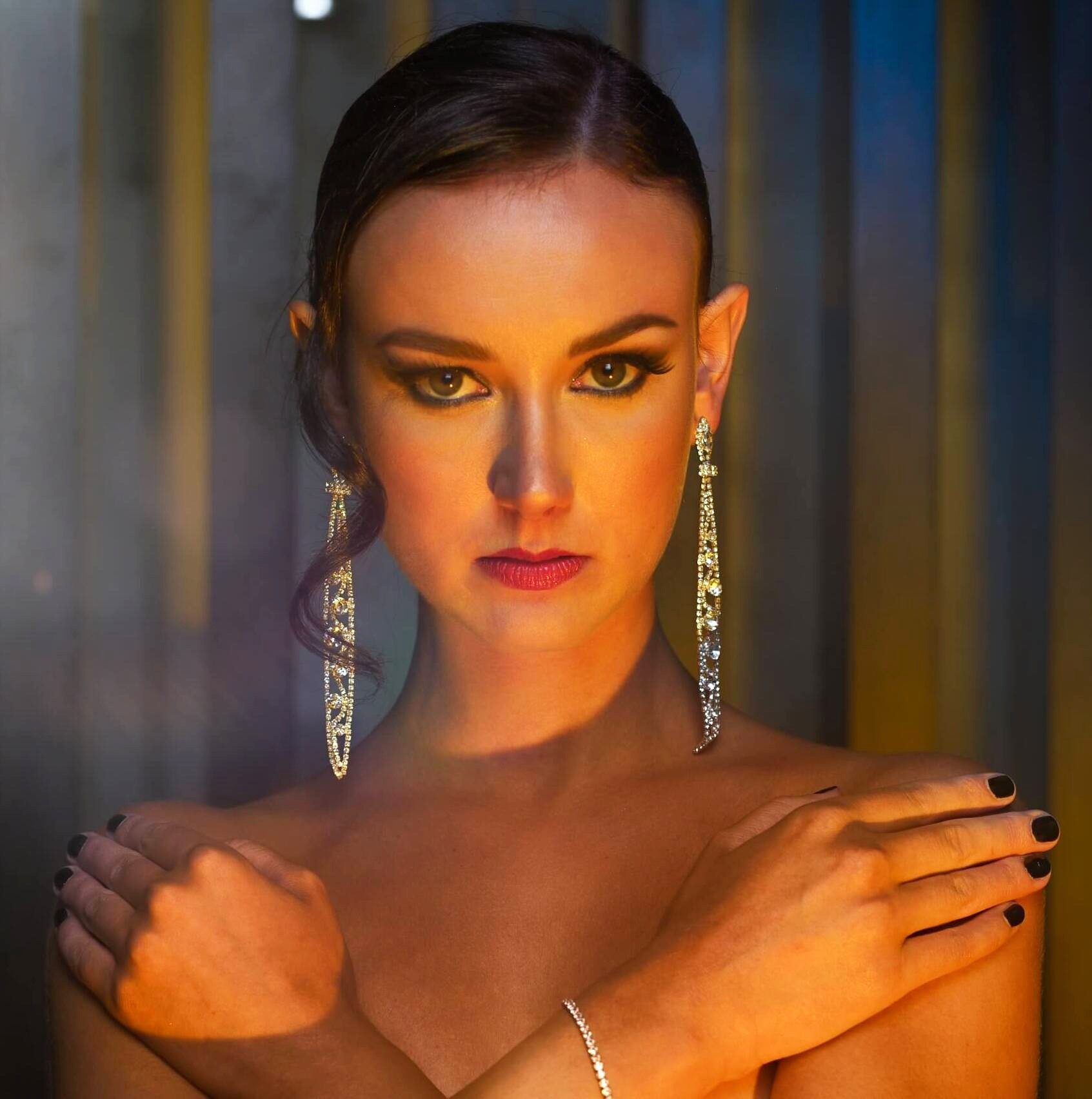
- Hinz in 2021
- Born: 1989 (age 36–37); Göttingen, Lower Saxony, West Germany
- Occupations: Creative director, writer and choreographer
- Years active: 2006–present
- Website: leahinz.com

Lea Hinz is a German creative director, writer and choreographer based in the United States. Her work spans live entertainment, immersive performance and interdisciplinary visual storytelling. A former aerial performer and rhythmic gymnast, Hinz was a six-time German national champion before pursuing an international performance career and later transitioning into directing and choreography.

== Early life ==
Lea Hinz was born in 1989 in Göttingen, West Germany. Both her parents were doctors.

Hinz began practicing rhythmic gymnastics at the age of eight and competed for TSV Obernjesa during her youth. She achieved significant success in the sport, winning the open competition at the Deutschland-Cup der Rhythmischen Sportgymnastik in 2006, an event considered the unofficial German national championship. In total, she won the German national championship six times and was part of the German national team before withdrawing shortly before the 2008 Summer Olympics. She wanted to retire from competitive gymnastics, but did go on a tour doing acrobatics with the Feuerwerk der Turnkunst (Firework of Gymnastics) troupe.

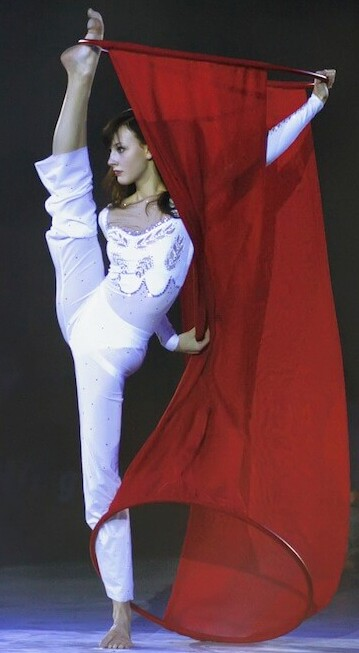
Hinz performs with Feuerwerk der Turnkunst in 2007.

After graduating high school in 2008, Hinz was about to start medical school in Berlin for neurology, but gave up her place when a director for a variety show offered her the opportunity to create an aerial acrobatics act. At first it was only going to be for an hour, then for a year, before she returned to her studies, but it became her career. Her father was initially dismayed, but approved of her choice when he saw how happy it made her.

== Performance career ==
Hinz performed contortion and aerial acrobatics with GOP Varieté-Theater Hannover and many other cabarets and event venues across Germany, including a 2011 performance in Hannover airport and onboard a special flight to and from the Canary Islands. She gradually began to specialize in the aerial hoop, performing aerial acrobatics sometimes 10 meters (33 ft) off the ground.

In September 2012, Hinz won 25,000 euros in the ZDF Germany's Superbrain television game show, by navigating a laser obstacle course while blindfolded. In 2012 she performed aerial hoop in Gütersloh and at the Urbanatix street art festival in Bochum.

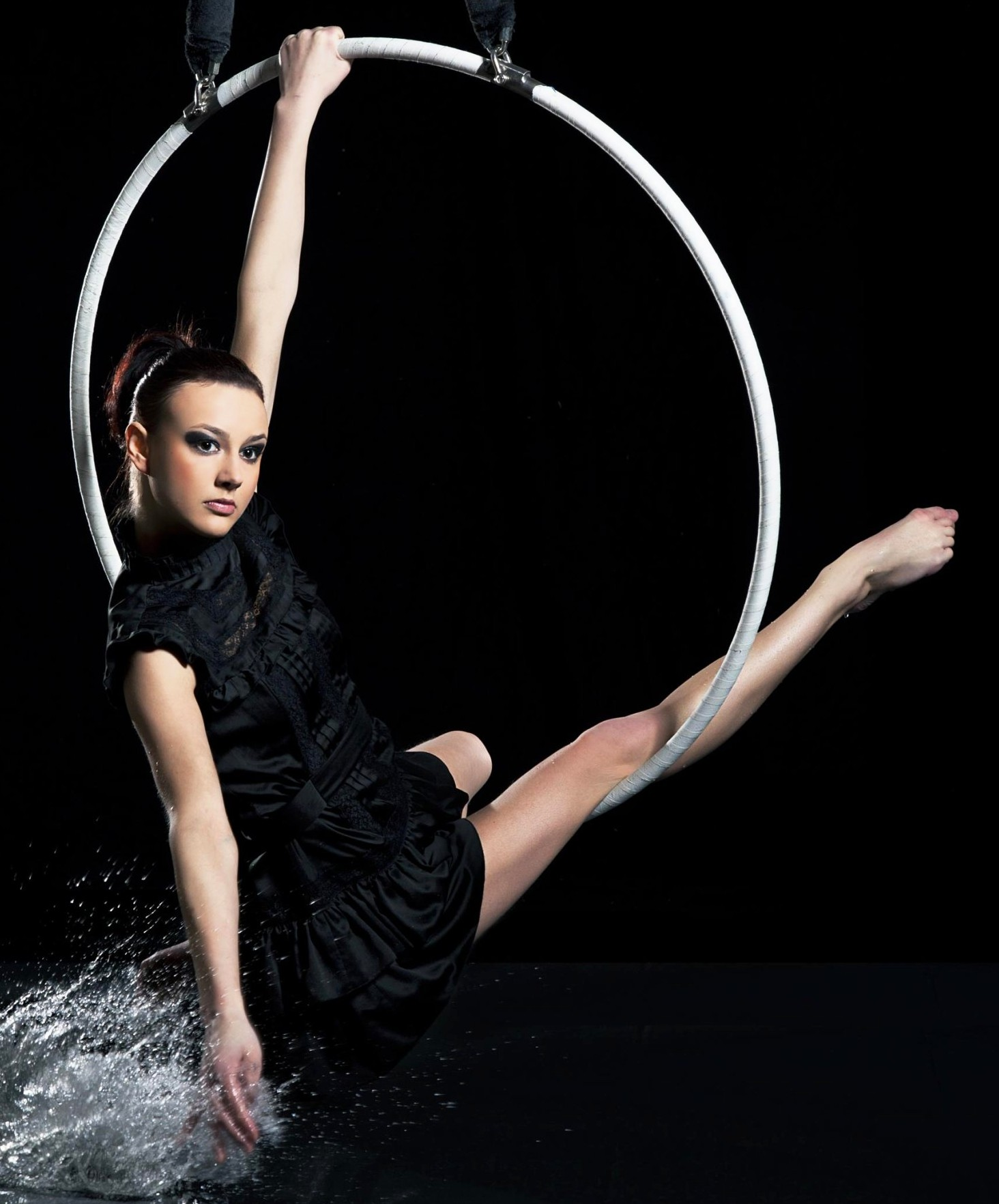
Hinz on the aerial hoop in 2013

Hinz began performing internationally in 2013, joining the Canadian contemporary circus company The 7 Fingers for the creation of A-Muse in Montreal and its subsequent performances in Mexico. In 2014, she appeared in the cabaret and variety production La Soirée in New York City, where she developed her aerial hoop solo Girl in Jeans, portraying a confident young woman performing in everyday clothing. Girl in Jeans became one of her signature performances, which she presented more than 2000 times in the Absinthe in Las Vegas. During the engagement with the production she also developed Mirror, a sensual aerial hoop performance incorporating a costume transformation from a red evening dress to lingerie.

In 2016, Hinz performed in Absinthe in Las Vegas, at Teatro ZinZanni in Seattle, while also returning to Europe for performances with Feuerwerk der Turnkunst touring productions. In 2017, she appeared in La Soirée at the Aldwych Theatre in London, and appeared on the La France a un incroyable talent (sometimes called France's Got Talent) French television show.

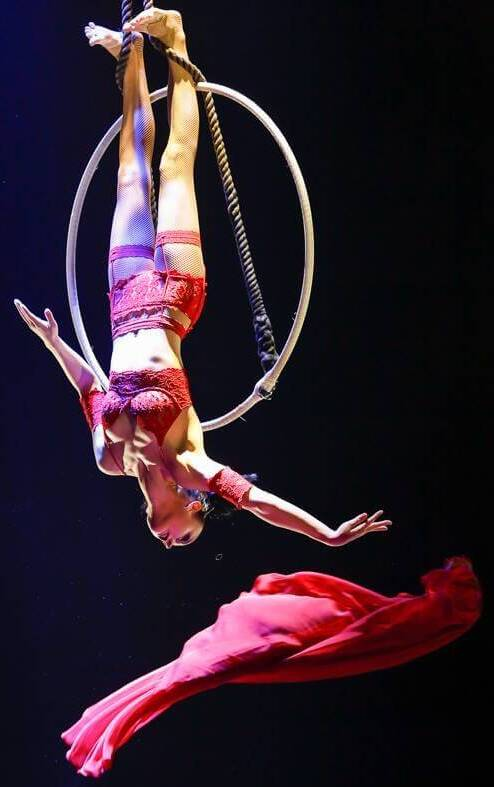
Hinz performing "Mirror" in 2016

By 2018, Hinz was based in Las Vegas, where she was under contract with Absinthe at Caesars Palace, while continuing to tour internationally. In 2021, she appeared on America's Got Talent and performed at Teatro ZinZanni in Chicago, returning to the prodction in 2023 and 2024.

== Director and choreographer ==
In 2021, during the shutdown of live entertainment caused by the COVID-19 pandemic, Hinz created and directed Consciencia, a short film featuring multiple performers. The film received the Silver Awards for Best Screendance Short and Best First Time Director (Female) from the Independent Shorts Awards in March 2022. Her short film Nasty Infinity, which she both directed and starred in, received the Outstanding Achievement Awards for Microfilm and Experimental Short at the 2022 Indie Short Fest (Los Angeles International Short Film Festival).

While performing for Circus FlicFlac in Kassel over the 2022–23 New Year period, Hinz began shifting her focus from performing to directing and creating her own productions. She become involved in the creation of the Particle Ink production Speed of Dark, an immersive show in which audiences move through the performance space, and Hinz developed her own immersive performance concepts. She started specializing in the combination of live performance with visual storytelling and interactive technologies.

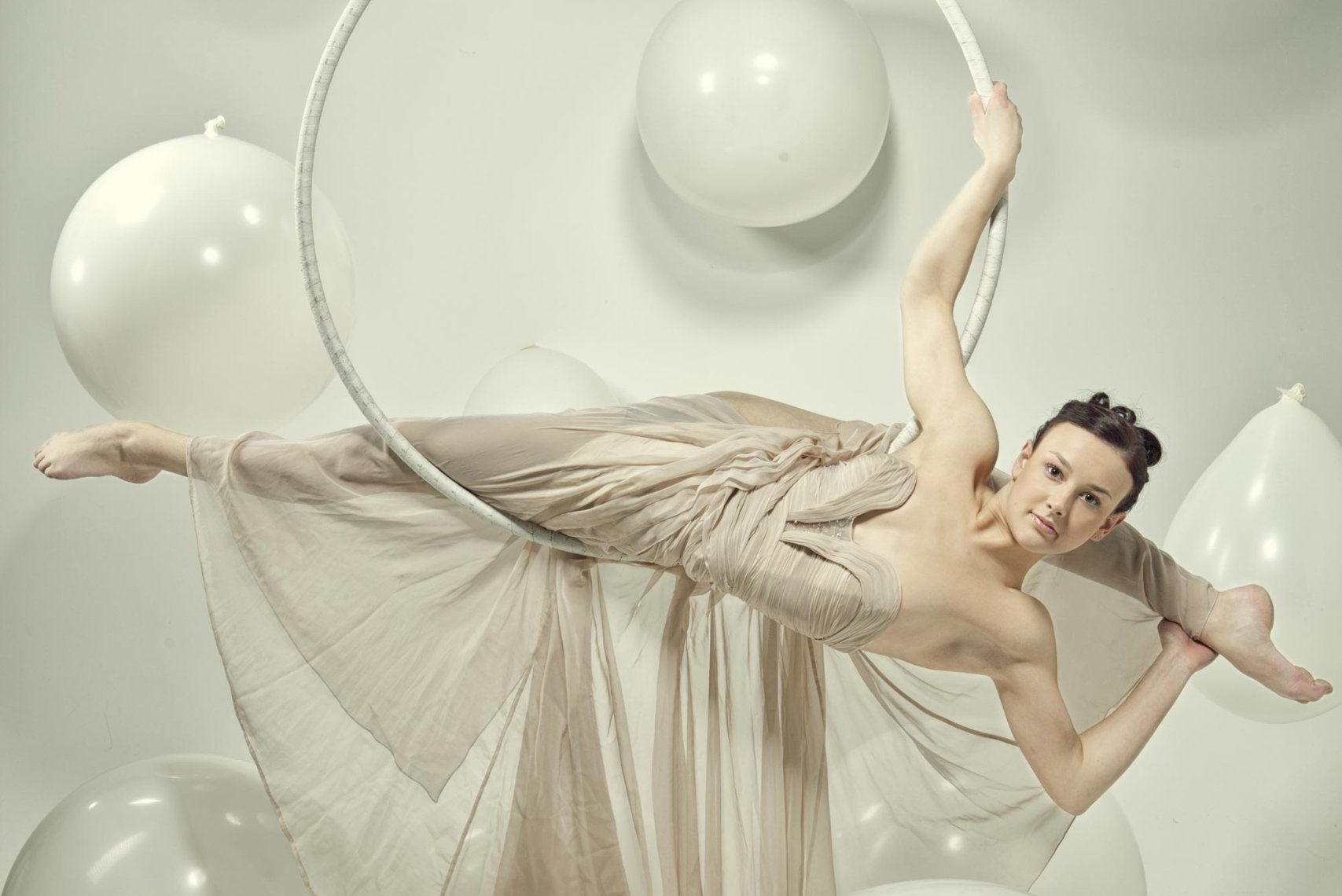
Hinz on the aerial hoop in 2013

In 2023, Hinz founded the entertainment company Cosmic Drama, through which she directs and choreographs immersive performance works based in Las Vegas. The company's debut production, After Dark, premiered in 2023 at the Las Vegas Circus Center and sold out its run. It was followed by Reflections, in 2023, Cloud 7 in 2024, and Dolls in 2025.

In addition to her own productions, Hinz has worked as creative director, stage director, writer and choreographer for other artists and companies. In 2021 and 2022 Hinz contributed to Feuerwerk der Turnkunst, working on show conception and choreography. In 2023 she and Carisa Hendrix co-directed the stage production Shuffled for magician Andi Gladwin. In 2024 she worked as choreographer and stage director for the Particle Ink production House of Shattered Prisms at Luxor Las Vegas. In 2025, Hinz served as Associate Creative Director for Dinner is a Dream, a new resident production at The Mayfair Supper Club at Bellagio Las Vegas.
