= Biblen =

Biblen is a stage play from Denmark, performed at Nørrebros Theater during early 2008 (23 February to 26 April). It takes the form of a skrako play, a Danish kind of play which blends acting, rapping, and stand-up comedy. All roles in Biblen were performed by stand-up comedians Jonatan Spang, Rune Klan (also a magician), and Linda P, and rappers Blæs Bukki and Tue Track.

The play is based on the Bible, deriving its plot from a number of Biblical stories, such as Cain and Abel, Noah's Ark, Moses and the Ten Commandments, the Workers in the Vineyard, the Last Supper, and the crucifixion of Jesus. It also serves as a satire of the Bible, the Church of Denmark, and the Danish relationship with religion more broadly.

== See also ==
- Life of Jesus in the New Testament
- Cultural Christian
- Christianity in Denmark
- Religion in Denmark

== Sources ==
- Website of the show (from archive.org) (in Danish)
- Review in Jyllands-Posten (in Danish)
