= Sarah Hester Ross =

Cabaret Artist and Musical comedian

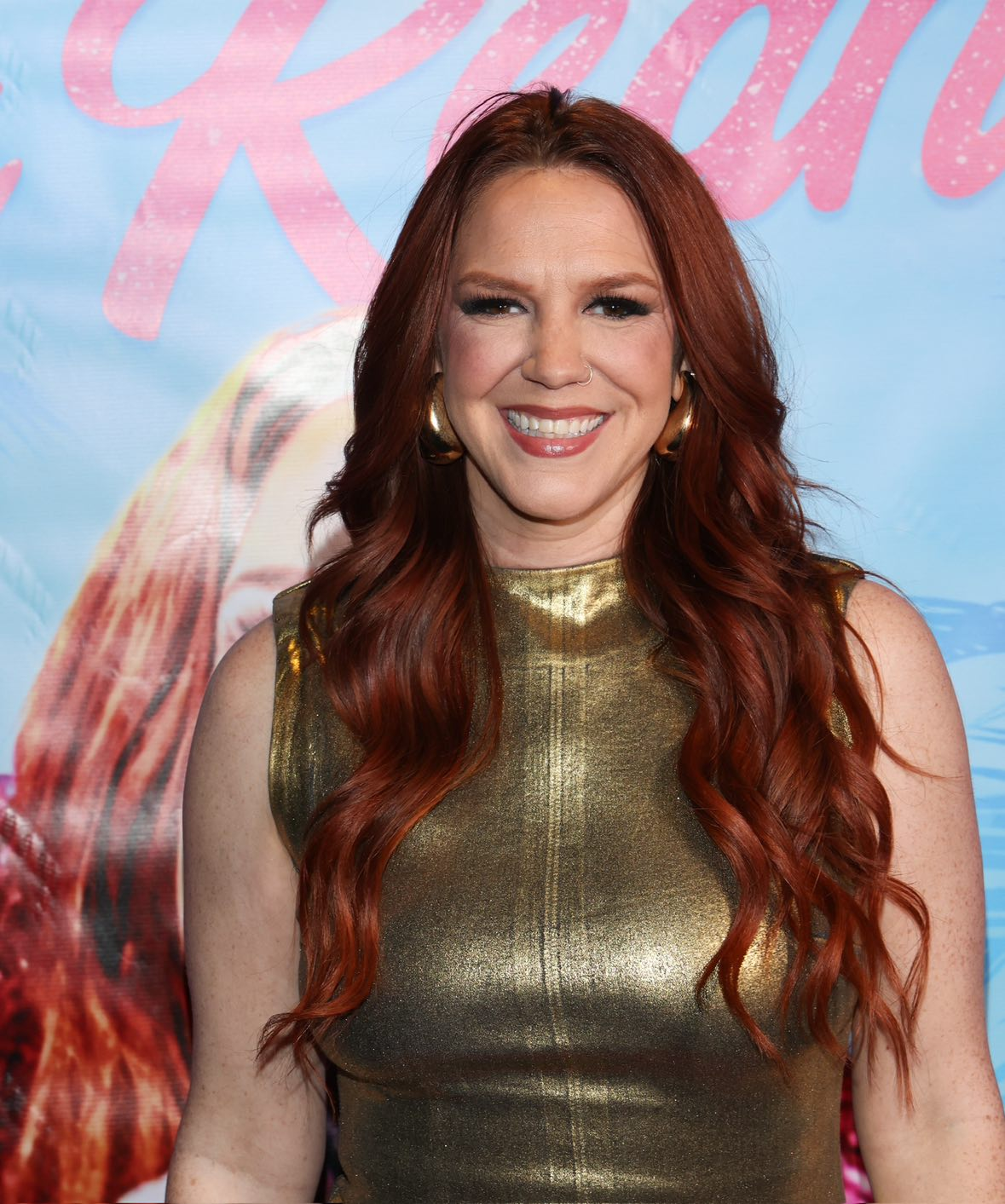
- Hester Ross at the Comedy Dynamics special viewing of ‘Don't Mess with a Redhead’ in 2024
- Born: October 7, 1985 (age 40); Tampa, Florida, U.S.

Comedy career
- Years active: 2008–present
- Genre: Musical Comedy
- Website: sarahhesterross.com

Sarah Hester Ross (born October 7, 1985) is an American cabaret artist, musical comedian and singer-songwriter living in Las Vegas, Nevada. She has amassed over two million TikTok followers and her catalog of music has more than 15 million streams. She is best known for her comedy songs "Stop Giving Men Microphones" and "Florida Man Friday" and her cover of Wyndreth Berginsdottir's "Savage Daughter."

Hester Ross has been named "Best One Woman Show" by Las Vegas Weekly and "Best Comedian" by the Las Vegas Review-Journal. She was featured on "America's Got Talent" and "The Doctor Demento Show."

== Early life and career ==
Originally from Tampa, Florida, Hester Ross has been performing onstage since the age of three. She studied vocal performance in college and plays multiple instruments, most proficient on piano and keytar.

After college, Hester Ross relocated to Orlando, Florida, performing in community theater and professionally at Universal Studios. In 2010, she was sidelined by the formation of scar tissue on her vocal cords. After undergoing surgery and working through recovery, Hester Ross moved into the world of dueling piano performance.

In 2013, Hester Ross landed the role of Jen in "The D* Word – A Musical," written and produced by Jeanie Linders, the creator of "Menopause The Musical." The show started in Florida and then toured nationally, including a stint at the Shimmer Cabaret in Las Vegas. At the conclusion of the tour, Hester Ross opted to remain Las Vegas. She continued her dueling piano career, working in various piano bars, and performed with "Raiding the Rock Vault." In 2019, she joined the team at Bar at Times Square at the New York-New York Hotel and Casino, where she currently plays regularly.

When the pandemic shuttered venues in 2020, Hester Ross focused on expanding her online presence. One of her most successful efforts was the creation of "Florida Man Friday." Every Friday, Hester Ross would post a comedic video, summarizing an article found via a Google search of "Florida Man" plus the current day's date. The videos were so popular, Hester Ross expanded to posting twice a week, adding a segment called "Florida Woman Wednesday."

Hester Ross's online success led to a post-pandemic three-month Vegas residency at Notoriety Live and subsequent US tour. "Don't Mess with a Redhead," a culmination of material from her residency and tour, was released on April 23, 2024.

In August 2024, Hester Ross brought her show "Sarah Hester Ross is What??" to the Edinburgh Festival Fringe in Scotland. The show highlights some of her most popular comedic bits, including her tendency to discuss sensitive social issues with a comedic twist.

Hester Ross has created a diverse catalog of songs, including originals like "Life Goes On" and "No Babies," covers of "Savage Daughter" and Matt Maltese's "As the World Caves In" and parodies like "Piano Babe" and "I'm Serving Cvnt." In 2023, she teamed up with internet celebrity Deanna Giulietti and released ten episodes of a podcast entitled "Too Much Find Less."
