= Cain and Abel =

First two sons of Adam and Eve

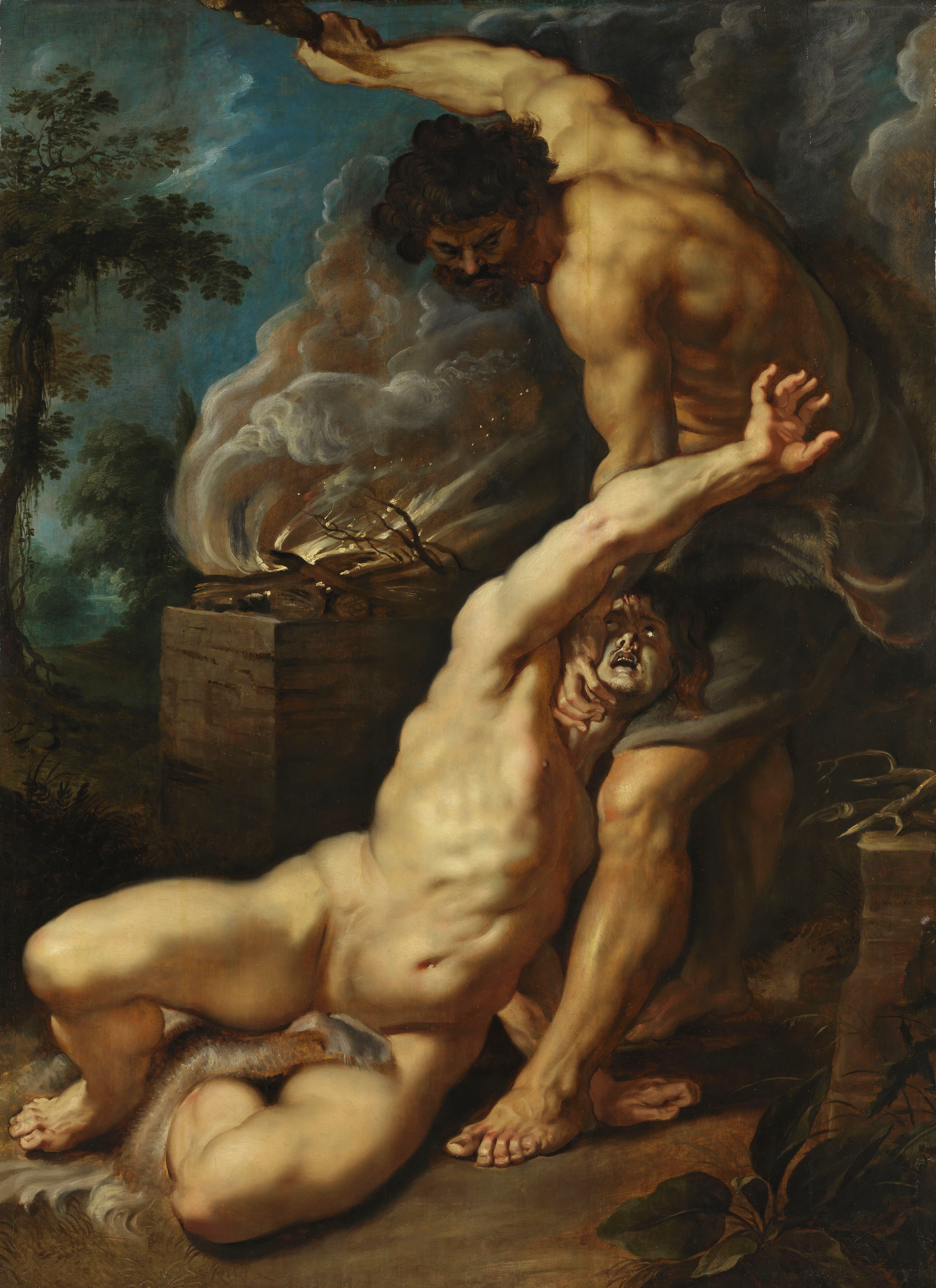
Cain slaying Abel, by Peter Paul Rubens, c. 1600

In the biblical Book of Genesis, Cain (Note: /keɪn/; Biblical Hebrew: קַיִן, romanized: Qayīn, in pausa קָיִן, Qāyīn; Ancient Greek: Κάϊν, romanized: Káïn; Arabic: قابيل/قايين, romanized: Qābīl / Qāyīn) and Abel (Note: /ˈeɪbəl/; Biblical Hebrew: הֶבֶל, romanized: Heḇel, in pausa הָבֶל, Hāḇel; Ancient Greek: Ἅβελ, romanized: Hábel; Arabic: هابيل, romanized: Hābīl) are the first two sons of Adam and Eve. Cain, the firstborn, was a farmer, and his brother Abel was a shepherd. The brothers made sacrifices, each from his own fields, to God. God had regard for Abel's offering, but had no regard for Cain's. Cain killed Abel, and upon God's enquiry, responded with "Am I my brother's keeper?". God judged it murder, cursing Cain and sentencing him to a life of transience, but gave him the Mark of Cain to protect him so that he is not killed by others. Cain then dwelt in the land of Nod (נוֹד, 'wandering'), where he built a city and fathered the line of descendants beginning with Enoch. Thus, Cain was the first person born, and Abel the first to die.

Cain is interpreted in Jewish, Muslim, and Christian tradition as the first murderer and liar, and Abel the first victim. Cain and Abel have become enduring cultural symbols of fratricide and sibling conflict, referenced and reinterpreted across art, literature, theater, music, and film from medieval times to modern popular culture.

== Genesis narrative ==
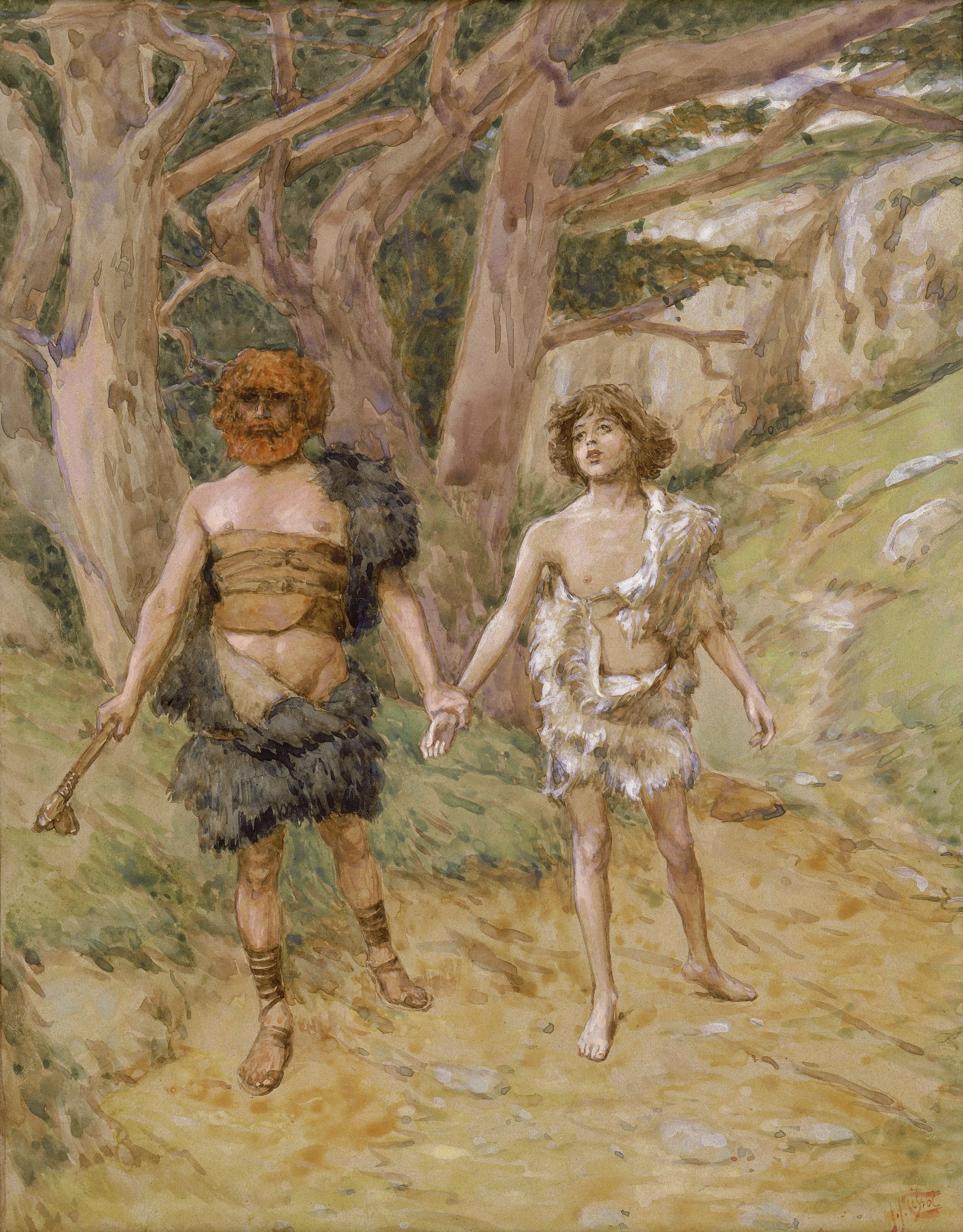
Cain leadeth Abel to death, by James Tissot, c. 1900

The story of Cain's murder of Abel and its consequences is told in Genesis 4:1–18:

Now the man knew his wife Eve, and she conceived and bore Cain, saying, "I have produced a man with the help of the Lord." (Note: 4:1 – The Hebrew verb "knew" implies intimate or sexual knowledge, along with possession. The name "Cain", which means "smith", resembles the verb translated as "gotten" but also possibly meaning "to make". (Alter 2008:29).) Next she bore his brother Abel. (Note: 4:2 – Abel's name could be associated with "vapor" or "puff of air". (Alter 2008:29).) Now Abel was a keeper of sheep, and Cain a tiller of the ground. In the course of time Cain brought to the Lord an offering of the fruit of the ground, and Abel for his part brought of the firstlings of his flock, their fat portions. And the Lord had regard for Abel and his offering, but for Cain and his offering he had no regard. So Cain was very angry, and his countenance fell. The Lord said to Cain,

"Why are you angry,
and why has your countenance fallen?
If you do well,
will you not be accepted?
And if you do not do well,
sin is lurking at the door;
its desire is for you,
but you must master it."

Cain said to his brother Abel, "Let us go out to the field." (Note: 4:8 – "Let us go out to the field" does not appear in the Masoretic Text, but is found in other versions including the Septuagint and Samaritan Pentateuch.) And when they were in the field, Cain rose up against his brother Abel, and killed him.

Then the Lord said to Cain, "Where is your brother Abel?" He said, "I do not know; am I my brother's keeper?" (Note: 4:9 – the phrase traditionally translated "am I my brother's keeper?" is Hebrew "Hă-šōmêr 'āḥî 'ānōḵî?". "Keeper" is from the verb shamar (שמר), 'guard, keep, watch, preserve.') And the Lord said, "What have you done? Listen; your brother's blood is crying out to me from the ground! And now you are cursed from the ground, which has opened its mouth to receive your brother's blood from your hand. (Note: 4:10–12 – Cain is cursed min-ha-adamah, from the earth, being the same root as "man" and Adam.) When you till the ground, it will no longer yield to you its strength; you will be a fugitive and a wanderer on the earth." Cain said to the Lord, "My punishment is greater than I can bear! Today you have driven me away from the soil, and I shall be hidden from your face; I shall be a fugitive and a wanderer on the earth, and anyone who meets me may kill me." Then the Lord said to him, "Not so! Whoever kills Cain will suffer a sevenfold vengeance." And the Lord put a mark on Cain, so that no one who came upon him would kill him.

Then Cain went away from the presence of the Lord, and settled in the land of Nod, east of Eden. Cain knew his wife, and she conceived and bore Enoch; and he built a city, and named it Enoch after his son Enoch.

— Book of Genesis, 4:1–18

== Origins ==
=== Etymology ===
"Cain" and "Abel" are English renderings of the Hebrew names. Eve's words at Cain's birth (Genesis 4:1) pun on the verb קָנָה (qānâ, "to acquire" or "to get") and the name קַיִן (qayin, "Cain"). Robert Alter and Victor Hamilton both hold that the name itself means "smith" (as in blacksmith), as in Aramaic and Arabic, also attested by Cain's descendant Tubal-cain, described as the first metalworker in Genesis 4:22. However, apart from the assonance, further links between the verb and the name is unlikely, since Hebrew names are often associated with words that sound alike regardless of meaning.

The text does not explain "Abel", as it does "Cain". McKeown suggests this is because the meaning would have been transparent to the original audience. The root הֶבֶל (hebel) means "breath", "vapour", or the air that remains after you exhale and is the word translated "vanity" or "nothing" in the refrain of Ecclesiastes; McKeown, Alter and Waltke connect it with the brevity of Abel's life. Minority interpretations include that the name is independent of the root, or that the Akkadian (Old Assyrian dialect) ablu ("son") is a more likely etymology.

=== Context of the story ===
Abel, the first murder victim, is sometimes seen as the first martyr, while Cain, the first murderer, is sometimes seen as an ancestor of evil. Some scholars suggest the pericope may have been based on the Sumerian myth Enlil Chooses the Farmer-God, in which the shepherd-god Emesh and the farmer-god Enten bring their dispute over which of them is better to the chief god Enlil, who rules in favor of Enten (the farmer).

Some scholars view the stories of Adam and Eve and Cain and Abel to be about the development of civilization during the age of agriculture; not the beginnings of man, but when people first learned agriculture, replacing the ways of the hunter-gatherer. It has also been seen as a depiction of nomadic conflict, the struggle for land and resources (and divine favour) between nomadic herders and sedentary farmers. However, Hamilton argues that such readings do not fit the narrative because conflicts of the ancient world set nomads of the steppe against urban agricultural societies which kept their own livestock, and in this narrative the farmer Cain is driven into nomadism and ends as the founder of the first city. John H. Walton argues that the occupations are not the source of conflict; they explain the choice of offerings. He points out it is God's response to the offerings that causes the conflict. Walton compares the Sumerian tale of Dumuzi and Enkimdu, in which a shepherd god and a farmer god compete for the favour of the goddess Inanna. McKeown agrees with Walton's comparison and adds that such tensions are only background to a story concerned with acceptance by God. Walton notes brotherly conflict is a rare motif in ancient Near Eastern literature. The Tale of Two Brothers (Egyptian) is the most well-known example. However, since its conflict is over a wife, Walton concludes that the surviving literature of the region offers no close parallels to Cain and Abel.

The academic theologian Joseph Blenkinsopp holds that Cain and Abel are symbolic rather than real. Like almost all of the persons, places and stories in the primeval history (the first eleven chapters of Genesis), they are mentioned nowhere else in the Hebrew Bible, a fact that for some scholars suggests that the history is a late composition attached to Genesis to serve as an introduction. The date is also disputed: the history may be as late as the Hellenistic period (first decades of the 4th century BCE) or as early as the 9th-8th centuries BCE, but the high level of Babylonian myth behind its stories has led others to date it to the Babylonian exile (6th century BCE).

=== Family tree ===
The following family tree of the line of Cain is compiled from a variety of biblical and extra-biblical texts.

Adam (Note: Genesis 4:1)	Eve
Cain	Abel (Note: Genesis 4:2)	Seth (Note: Genesis 4:25; 5:3)
Enoch (Note: Genesis 4:17)	Enos (Note: Genesis 4:26; 5:6–7)
Irad (Note: Genesis 4:18)	Kenan (Note: Genesis 5:9–10)
Mehujael	Mahalalel (Note: Genesis 5:12–13)
Methushael	Jared (Note: Genesis 5:15–16)
Adah (Note: Genesis 4:19)	Lamech	Zillah	Enoch (Note: Genesis 5:18–19)
Jabal (Note: Genesis 4:20)	Jubal (Note: Genesis 4:21)	Tubal-Cain (Note: Genesis 4:22)	Naamah	Methuselah (Note: Genesis 5:21–22)
Lamech (Note: Genesis 5:25–26)
Noah (Note: Genesis 5:28–30)
Shem (Note: Genesis 5:32)	Ham	Japheth

=== Sisters/wives ===
Some early commentators have speculated that Cain and Abel had sisters, usually twin sisters, although this is not attested in the text. According to Rabbi Joshua ben Karha as quoted in Genesis Rabbah, "Only two entered the bed, and seven left it: Cain and his twin sister, Abel and his two twin sisters."

== Jewish tradition ==
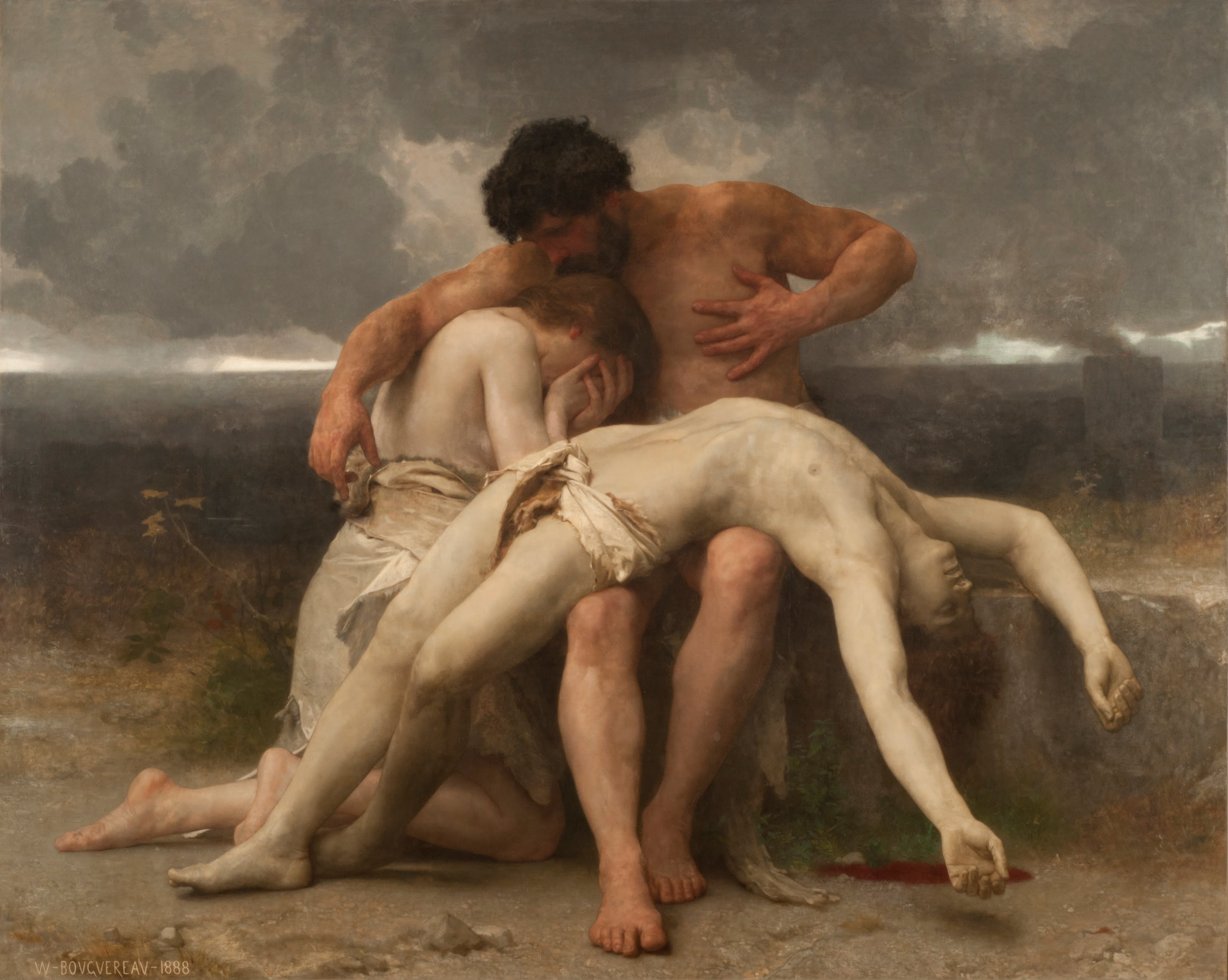
The First Mourning (Adam and Eve mourn the death of Abel); oil on canvas 1888 painting by William-Adolphe Bouguereau

In Jewish tradition, has Cain become the archetypal sinner, the first murderer, and "their instructor in wicked practices", both greedy and violent (Josephus), and archetypal egoist and a leader of others into sin (Philo). In the Testament of Benjamin Cain suffers a plague every hundred years, and those who are like him in hatred of a brother are promised the same judgment. Ancient interpreters interpreted the narrative as a conflict between good and evil: Abel was a righteous martyr, and Cain became a symbol of evil. Pirke De-Rabbi Eliezer makes him the ancestor of all the generations of the wicked.

In the Book of Enoch (22:7) from the Ethiopian Jewish canon, the soul of Abel is described as having been appointed as the chief of martyrs, crying for vengeance, for the destruction of the seed of Cain. A similar view is later shown in the Testament of Abraham (A:13 / B:11), where Abel has been raised to the position as the judge of the souls.

The Hebrew text of Genesis 4:8 says that Cain spoke to Abel but does not report what he said. Ancient translators filled the gap, in the Septuagint and the Samaritan Pentateuch with the words "Let us go to the field".. All the Targums (except Onkelos) add an expansion in which the murder follows an argument about the justice of God. In Neofiti, Cain complains that because God rejected his offering and accepted Abel's, the world is not governed justly. Abel replies that his offering was accepted because his deeds were righteous. In Pseudo-Jonathan and Neofiti the Cain also declares "There is no Judgment, there is no Judge, there is no other world", and Abel affirms each of these in turn. This debate between Cain and Abel serves to explain why God preferred Abel's offering and also why Cain killed him; Abel's blunt reference to his own better deeds could have provoked Cain's rage. It presents Cain as a denier of divine justice, a forerunner of later philosophical deniers. Cain becomes the first heretic whose wickedness rests on doubt about divine justice and future judgment, and Abel a martyr for correct doctrine. Scholars are not certain of the exact date of the addition, but many think it is from the first century AD.

Other rabbinic sources do not focus on the theological debate, but propose more worldly motives. Genesis Rabbah 22:7 proposes a quarrel over dividing the world's land and movable goods, over where the Temple should be built, or over the first Eve or a twin sister born with Abel. Pirke De-Rabbi Eliezer 21 says that Cain desired Abel's twin sister. A tosefta to the Palestinian Targum found in the Cairo Genizah mentions the justice debate as well as a dispute over dividing the flocks and the land, but says the real cause a grudge over each other's wives. The Midrash and the Conflict of Adam and Eve with Satan, posit that the motive involved a desire for the most beautiful woman. According to Midrashic tradition, Cain and Abel each had twin sisters; each was to marry the other's. The Midrash states that Abel's promised wife, Aclima, was more beautiful than Awan, Cain's promised wife. And so, after Cain would not consent to this arrangement, Adam suggested seeking God's blessing by means of a sacrifice. Whoever God blessed would marry Aclima. When God openly rejected Cain's sacrifice, Cain slew his brother in a fit of jealousy and anger. Rabbinical exegetes have discussed whether Cain's incestuous relationship with his sister was in violation of halakha.

The Mishnah uses Genesis 4:10, ("blood(s) cries out from the ground") in Sanhedrin 4:5 to warn witnesses in capital cases that destroying one life is like destroying a whole world, interpreting it as Abel's blood and that of his descendants who would have been born to him. It also records a second explanation, that Abel's blood was spattered over trees and stones. Targum Neofiti speaks of "the righteous multitudes that were to arise from Abel".

== Christian tradition ==
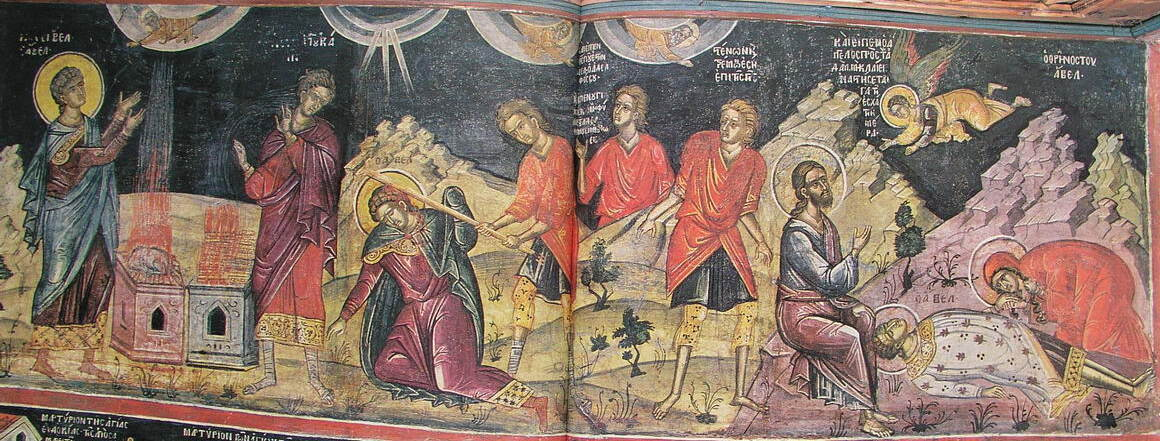
Fresco from Dionysiou Monastery

=== Matthew and Luke ===
In Matthew 23:35 (paralleled in Luke 11:51), Jesus uses Abel as the archetype of the righteous martyr in his polemic against the Pharisees, when talking about them killing the prophets:

"...so that upon you may come all the righteous blood shed on earth, from the blood of righteous Abel to the blood of Zechariah son of Barachiah, whom you murdered between the sanctuary and the altar."

— Matthew 23:35

John Nolland notes that this representation could be either chronological (the first righteous martyr to the latest one), or canonical. Matthew also uses the imagery of "the ground" on which the blood is spilt in Genesis 4:10.

=== Hebrews ===
Hebrews 11:4, makes a brief reference to the Cain and Abel story:

By faith Abel offered to God a more acceptable sacrifice than Cain's. Through this he received approval as righteous, God himself giving approval to his gifts; he died, but through his faith he still speaks.

— Hebrews 11:4

In Hebrews 11, a chapter on heroes of faith, Abel is cited as the first example. Ben Witherington notes that the original text in Genesis does not say that Abel's sacrifice was greater, nor that he had faith. F. F. Bruce held that it was superior because of the faith and righteousness of the one who offered it. The statement in Hebrews that Abel "still speaks" may refer to the wording in Genesis 4:10 that the blood of Abel was crying from the ground, which Hebrews 12:24 contrasts with the blood of Jesus that "speaks a better word than the blood of Abel".

=== 1 John ===
Cain and Abel are also referred to in 1 John 3:12:

Do not be like Cain, who belonged to the evil one and murdered his brother. And why did he murder him? Because his own actions were evil and his brother’s were righteous.

— 1 John 3:12

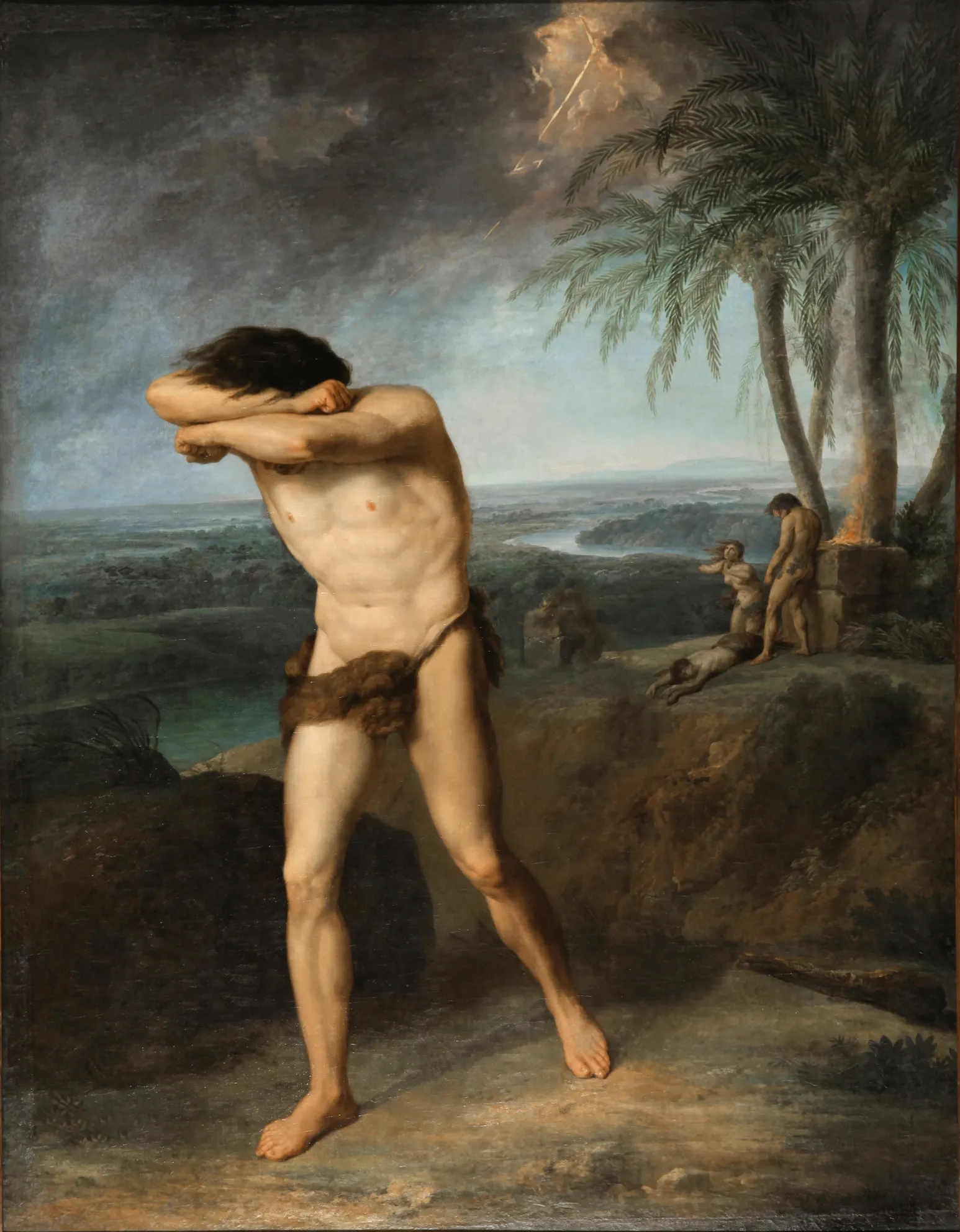
Cain by Friedrich Rehberg, c. 1791

This is 1 John's only direct reference to the Old Testament, using the same verb (ἔσφαξεν, esphaxen) used of sacrificial slaughter, perhaps implying that the murder was an even less acceptable sacrifice than Cain's offering. The verb also means "slaughtered" or "butchered" in a brutal way. 1 John traces Cain's hatred to the devil, which recalls Jesus's description of the devil in John 8:44 as "a murderer from the beginning". On Stott's reading the motive the letter gives is jealousy of Abel's greater righteousness. The description of Cain as "of the evil one" may indicate that the Johannine circle interpreted Cain as the prototypical murderer from Satan.

=== Jude ===
The Epistle of Jude warns against false teachers who "walked in the way of Cain and abandon themselves to selfish gain" (Jude 1:11). This uses the image of Cain in the Jewish tradition as the archetypal sinner leading others to sin. Bauckham proposes that if the letter was written when the Targumic picture of Cain as a denier of divine judgment was already current, Jude may also be implying that his own opponents (the false teachers referred to in the verse) similarly denf future judgment and use it as licence for immorality.

=== Liturgy ===
Abel is invoked in the litany for the dying in the Latin Church, and his sacrifice is mentioned in the Canon of the Mass along with those of Abraham and Melchizedek. The Alexandrian Rite commemorates him with a feast day on 28 December.

=== The "other" and exclusion ===
Modern theologians such as Miroslav Volf interpret Cain and Abel as an account of how people come to exclude others. Following Claus Westermann, he argues that because its genre is primeval history, it is a description of the human condition, and so cannot be used by one group to cast its opponents as "Cain". He concurs with René Girard that the narrative is told from the victim's side and condemns the perpetrator, but also protects the perpetrator from the victim's revenge through the mark placed on Cain.

== Islamic tradition ==
The story of Cain and Abel appears in the Quran 5:27–31:

[Prophet], tell them the truth about the story of Adam's two sons: each of them offered a sacrifice, and it was accepted from one and not the other. One said, 'I will kill you,' but the other said, 'God only accepts the sacrifice of those who are mindful of Him. If you raise your hand to kill me, I will not raise mine to kill you. I fear God, the Lord of all worlds, and I would rather you were burdened with my sins as well as yours and became an inhabitant of the Fire: such is the evildoers' reward.' But his soul prompted him to kill his brother: he killed him and became one of the losers. God sent a raven to scratch up the ground and show him how to cover his brother's corpse and he said, 'Woe is me! Could I not have been like this raven and covered up my brother's body?' He became remorseful.

— The Quran, translated by Muhammad Abdel-Haleem

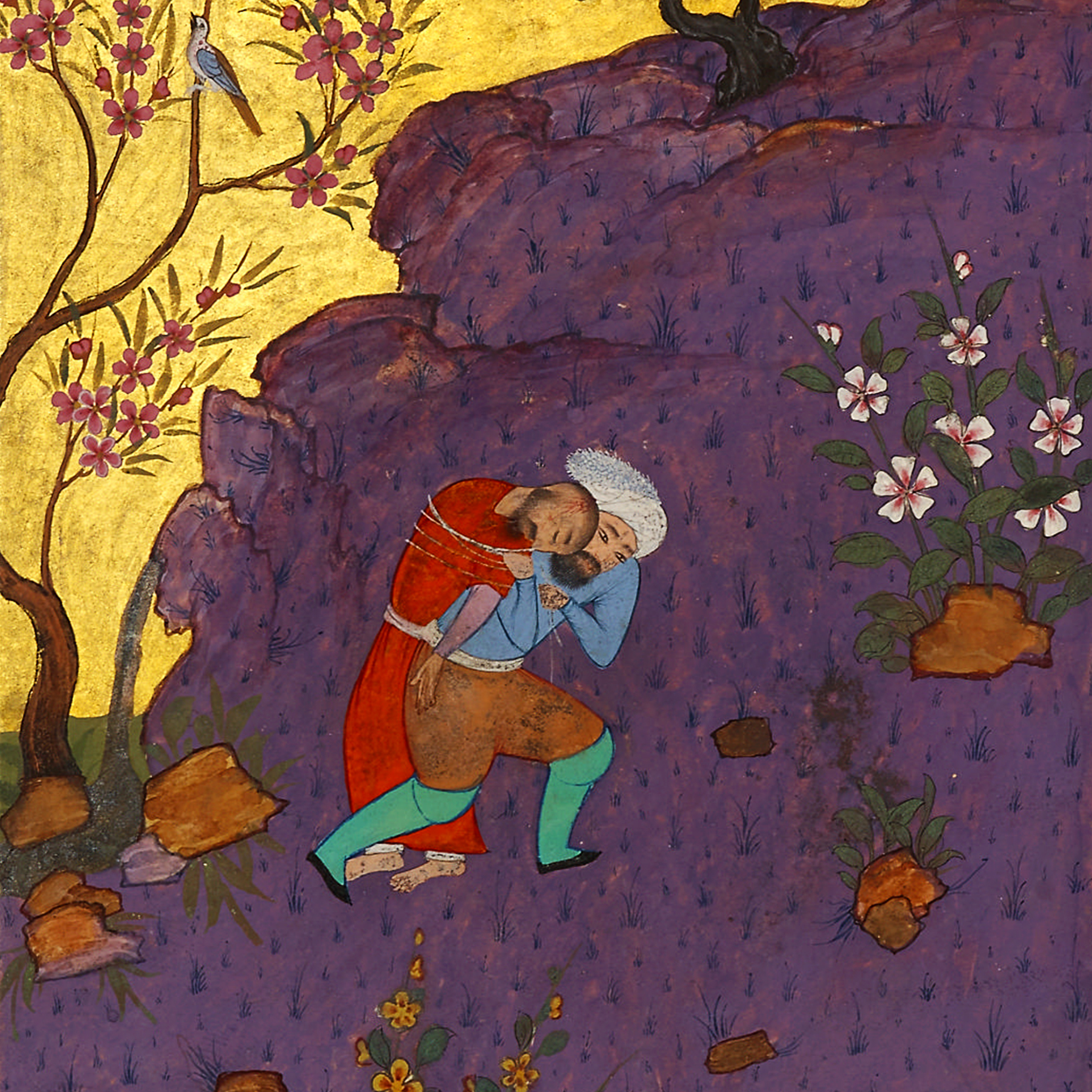
Islamic illustration of Cain carrying his murdered brother, Abel, to hide his body from God from a Stories of the Prophets manuscript.

The story of Cain and Abel has been used as a deterrent from murder in Islamic tradition. Abdullah ibn Mas'ud reported that Muhammad said in a hadith:

No soul is wrongfully killed except that some of the burden falls upon the son of Adam, for he was the first to establish the practice of murder.

Muslim scholars were divided on the motive for Cain's murder of Abel, and why the brothers were obliged to offer sacrifices to God. Some scholars believed that Cain's motives were jealousy and lust. Both Cain and Abel desired to marry their sister, Adam's beautiful daughter, Aclima (Arabic: Aqlimia'). Seeking to end the dispute, Adam suggested that each present an offering to God. The one whose offering God accepted would marry Aclima. Abel, a generous shepherd, offered the fattest of his sheep as an oblation to God. But Cain, a miserly farmer, offered only a bunch of grass and some worthless seeds. God accepted Abel's offering and rejected Cain's—an indication that Abel was more righteous than Cain, and thus worthier of Aclima. As a result, it was decided that Abel would marry Aclima. Cain would marry her less beautiful sister. Blinded by anger and lust for Aclima, Cain sought to get revenge on Abel and escape with Aclima.

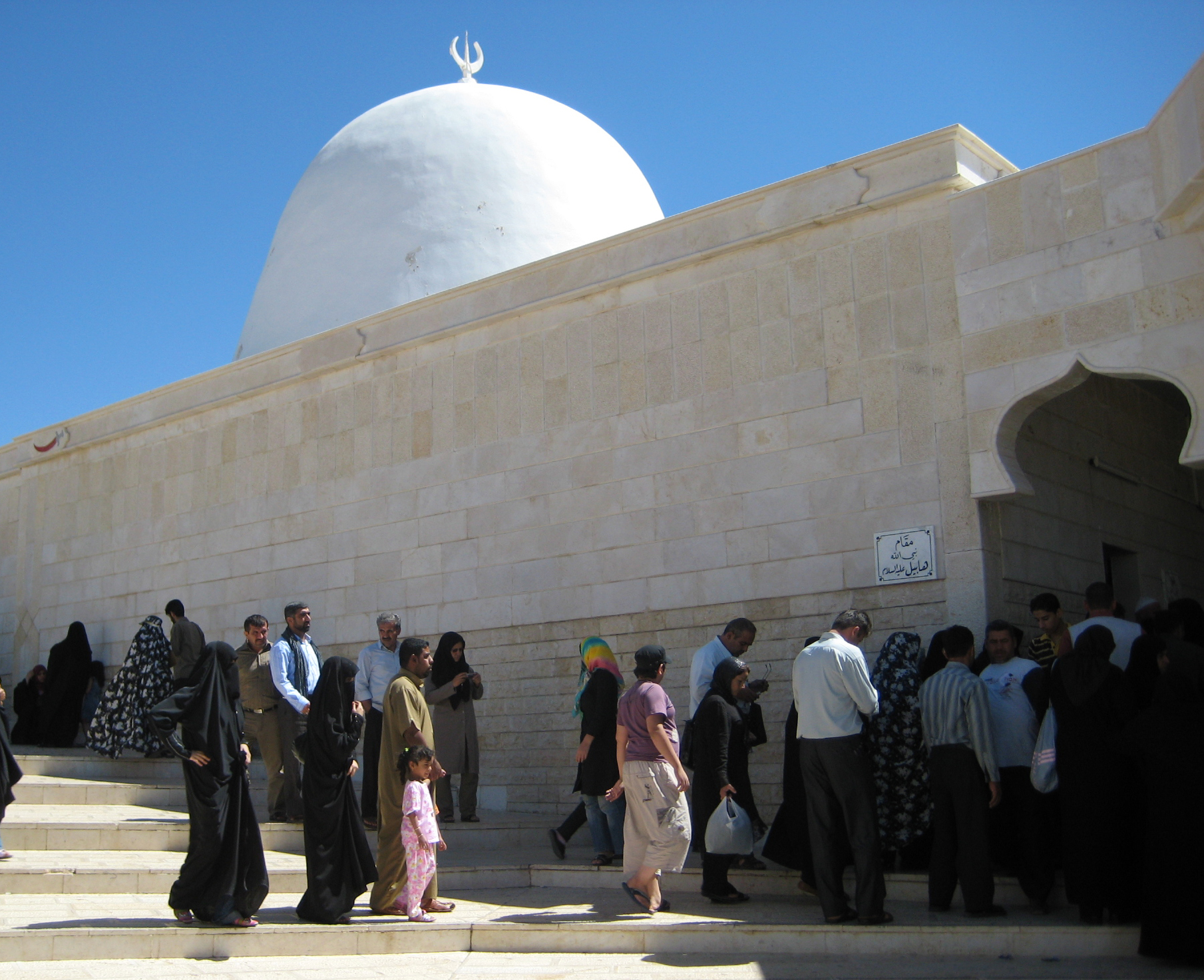
The Mausoleum of Abel in the Nabi Habeel Mosque

According to another tradition, the devil appeared to Cain and instructed him how to exact revenge on Abel. "Hit Abel's head with a stone and kill him," whispered the devil to Cain. After the murder, the devil hurried to Eve shouting: "Eve! Cain has murdered Abel!" Eve did not know what murder was or how death felt. She asked, bewildered and horrified, "Woe to you! What is murder?" "He [Abel] does not eat. He does not drink. He does not move [That is what murder and death are]," answered the Devil. Eve burst into tears and started to wail madly. She ran to Adam and tried to tell him what happened. However, she could not speak because she could not stop wailing. Since then, women wail broken-heartedly when a loved one dies. A different tradition narrates that while Cain was quarreling with Abel, the devil killed an animal with a stone in Cain's sight to show him how to murder Abel.

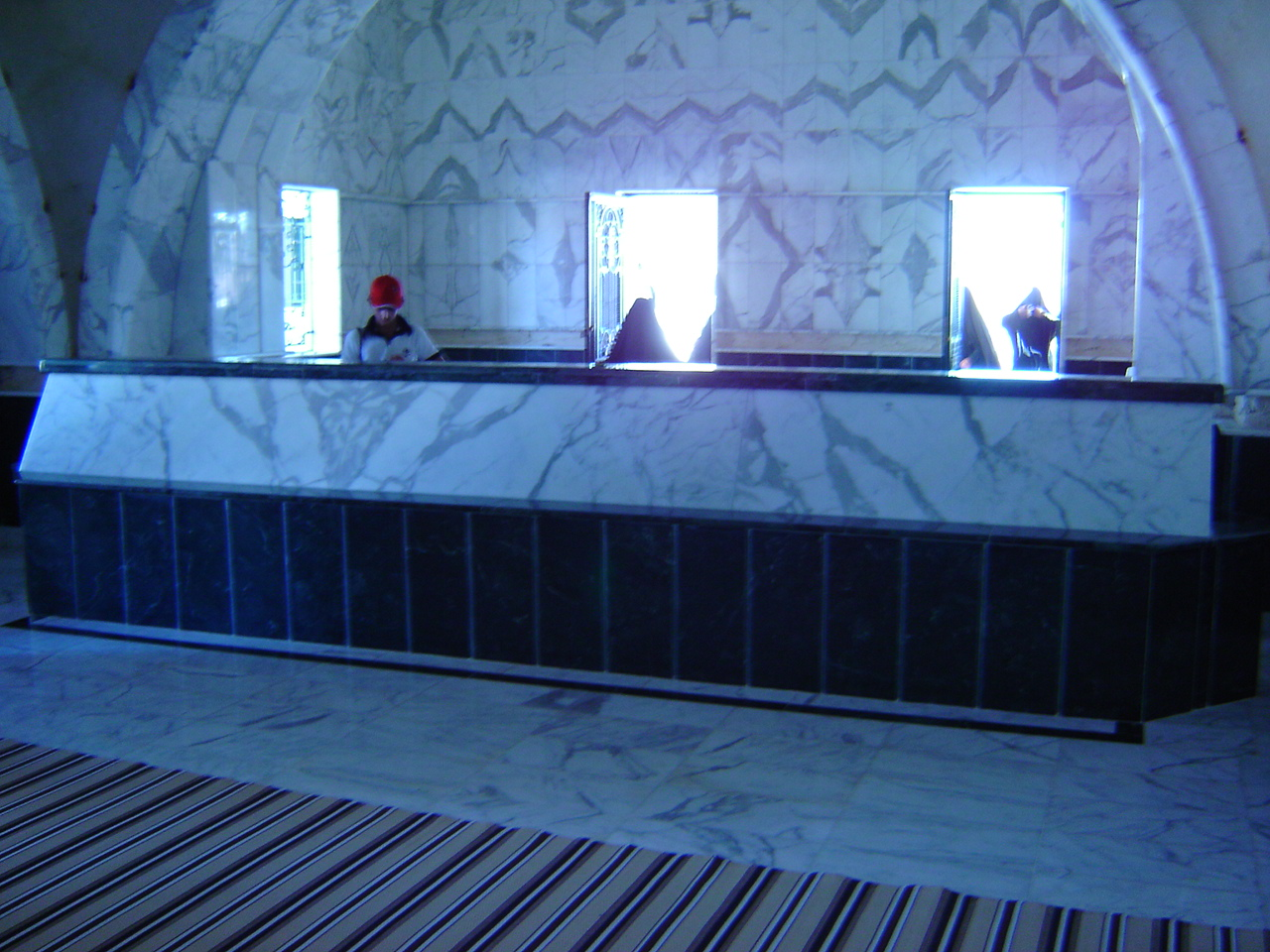
Grave of Abel within the Nabi Habeel Mosque

After burying Abel and escaping from his family, Cain married and had children. They died in Noah's flood among tyrants and unbelievers.

Some Muslim scholars puzzled over the mention of offerings in the narrative of Cain and Abel. Offerings and sacrifices were ordained only after the revelation of Tawrat to Moses in Islam. This suggested to some scholars, such as Sa'id ibn al-Musayyib, that the sons of Adam, as mentioned in the Quran, are actually two Israelites, not Cain and Abel.

== Modern exegetical interpretation ==
=== The offerings ===
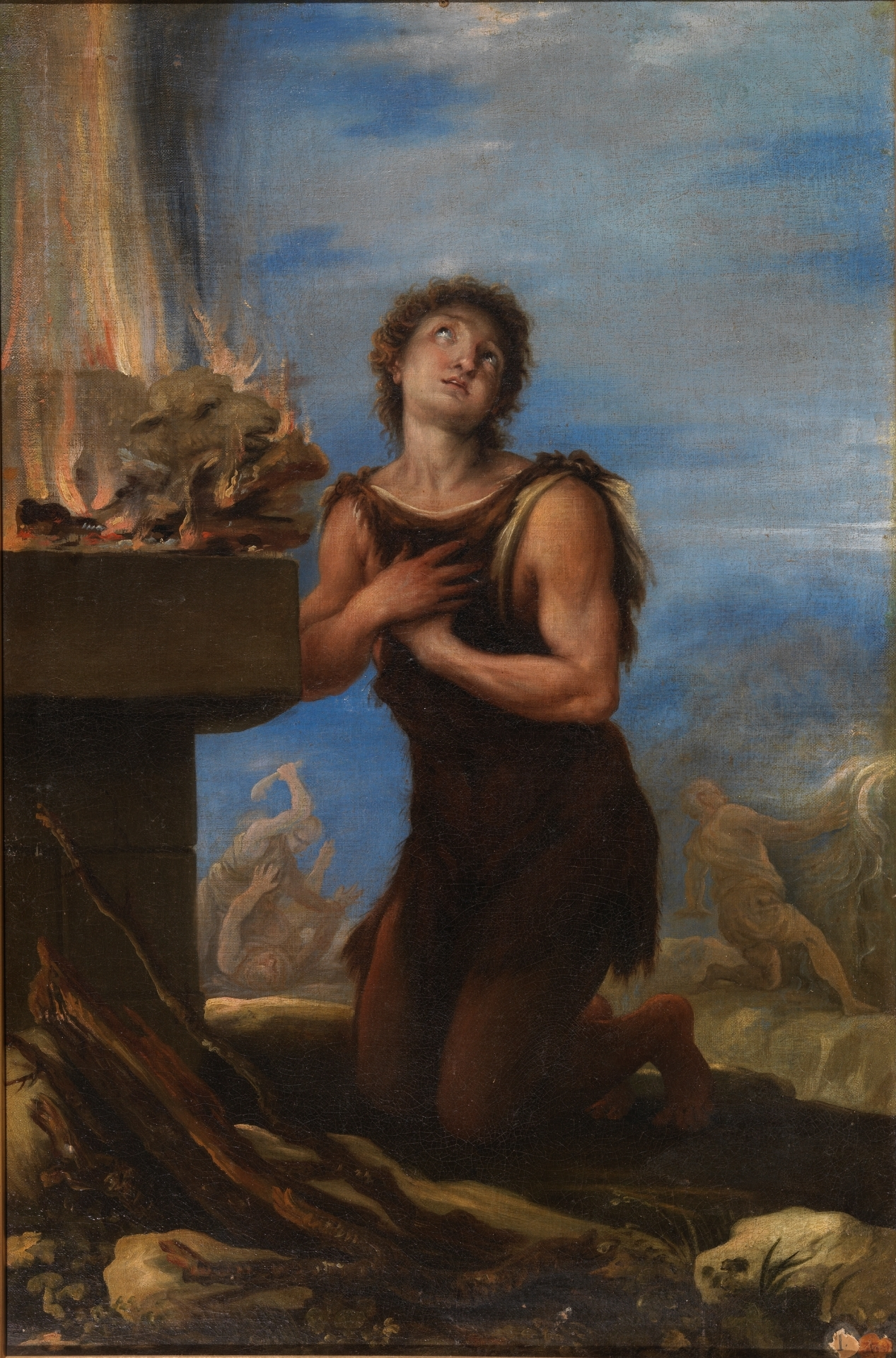
Sacrifice of Abel by Juan Antonio de Frías y Escalante, c. 1667

Now Abel was a keeper of sheep, and Cain a worker of the ground. In the course of time Cain brought to the LORD an offering of the fruit of the ground, and Abel also brought of the firstborn of his flock and of their fat portions. And the LORD had regard for Abel and his offering, but for Cain and his offering he had no regard. So Cain was very angry, and his face fell.

— Genesis 4:2–5

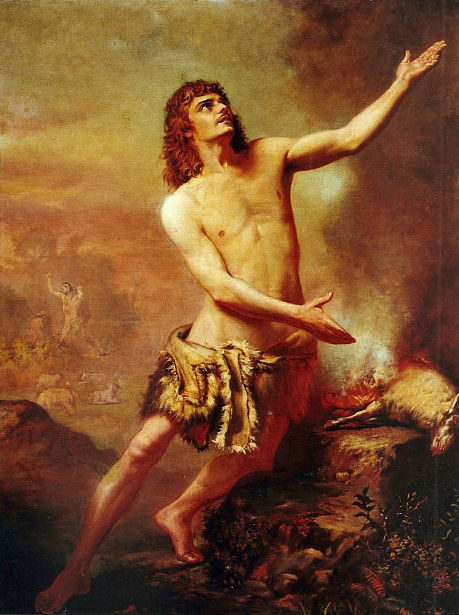
Painting of Abel by Rodolfo Amoedo c. 1878

Both brothers bring a מִנְחָה (minḥâ, "offering" or "tribute"), which is the word later used for the grain offering of Leviticus 2:1–16. Walton notes that in principle there was nothing wrong with Cain's offering of grain, since such offerings were common in the ancient world. The Genesis account does not say why one offering was accepted and the other was not. Various explanations have been offered over the centuries: that what grows of itself is a more fitting sacrifice than what has to be cultivated (Josephus); that Cain's produce, unlike Abel's firstlings, was not first fruits (Ibn Ezra and Philo, as well as the Midrash); that God disapproved of farming because it tied a man to one place (Hermann Gunkel); and that Cain was miserly or stingy. Hamilton observes that all of these are attempts at theodicy, a rational defence of God's conduct, and suggests that "perhaps the silence is the message itself": the fault may have been an inward attitude known only to God, which he takes to be the reading of the New Testament.

Gerhard von Rad proposed that Abel's offering was preferred because it involved blood. Bruce Waltke rejects this view because the minḥâ is a bloodless offering in the Pentateuch. He, as well as McKeown, point to the different descriptions of the offerings: Cain brings "some of the fruits" with no indication that they were the first or the best, while Abel brings fat portions from the firstborn of his flock. Waltke calls Cain's sin "tokenism".

The narrative of Cain and Abel is the first of a series of examples of the Bible's subversion of the practice of primogeniture, where the firstborn is the heir. (Note: Other examples of this preference include Jacob over Esau in Genesis 25:23, Isaac over Ishmael in Genesis 17:19, Joseph over his older brothers in Genesis 17:19, Ephraim over Menasseh in Genesis 48:13–19)

=== "Sin is crouching at the door" ===
The LORD said to Cain, “[...] sin is crouching at the door. Its desire is for you, and you must rule over it.”

— Genesis 4:6–7

Robert Alter says that the opening clause is so elliptic in the Hebrew that "any construal is no more than an educated guess". Hamilton calls God's warning to Cain "one of the hardest verses in Genesis to translate and to understand". Difficulties include the pairing of a feminine noun for "sin" with a masculine participle. E. A. Speiser theorises that the participle רֹבֵץ (rōbēṣ) comes from the Akkadian rābiṣu, which is a demon believed to lurk at the entrances of buildings. Walton mentions that alternatively, in earlier Akkadian texts the rābiṣu was an official with a judicial role. However, due to the mention of sin's desire to master Cain, he finds the demonic sense more probable. Waltke interprets the image as sin depicted as a demon or a vicious animal lying in wait, possibly alluding to the serpent of Genesis 3:15.

The rest of the verse ("Its desire is for you, and you must rule over it.") echoes the previous chapter of Genesis. The same word is used for sin's "desire" toward Cain as for the woman's desire for her husband in Genesis 3:16. Furthermore, the verb for Cain's mastering sin is the one used there of the husband ruling over her. The Hebrew verb can be read as a promise ("you shall master it"), a command ("you must") or an invitation ("you may"). Hamilton notes that all these versions preserve Cain's ability to choose.

=== "Am I my brother's keeper?" ===
Then the Lord said to Cain, “Where is Abel your brother?” He said, “I do not know; am I my brother’s keeper?”

— Genesis 4:9

The fraternal relationship between Cain and Abel is emphasized in the text. Waltke notes the word "brother" is used seven times in Genesis 4:2–11, and Alter notes that the victim is twice called "his brother" at the murder and repeatedly "your brother" in God's accusation. Miroslav Volf cites Ellen van Wolde in observing that Abel is repeatedly called Cain's brother while Cain is never called Abel's brother.

The first half of Cain's reply ("I do not know") is a lie and the second half is a rejection of God's question. The word translated "keeper", שֹׁמֵר (šōmēr, "keeper" or "guardian"), was taken by David Daube to be a legal term for a person entrusted with the custody of something. Waltke points out the irony of Cain later fearing for his life, because no one will be "his keeper".

The interrogation scene is part of a pattern started in Genesis 3. First, there is God's question ("Where is Abel your brother?"), similar to his question to Adam, "Where are you?" (Genesis 3:9). Then, both Adam and Cain face a curse involving the ground, and then both are sent away from God's presence to the east of Eden. Alter finds here the start of a biblical pattern in which history is a cycle of "approximate and significant recurrences". The verb used for the cry of Abel's blood in Genesis 4:10 is the one used elsewhere of the cry of the oppressed, such as the Israelites in Egypt.

=== Punishment, the mark and Nod ===
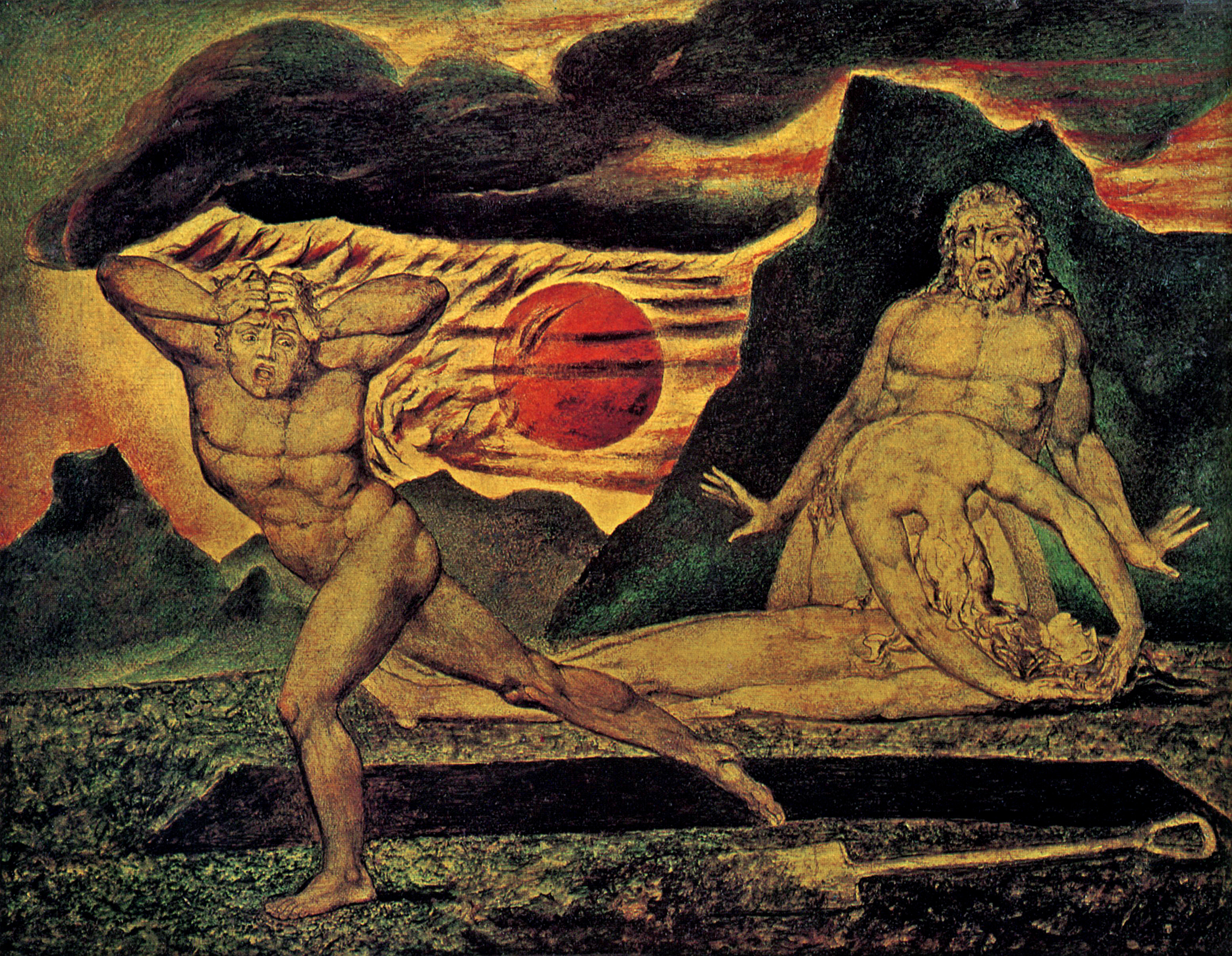
The Body of Abel Found by Adam and Eve by William Blake, 1826

In Genesis 4:11–16, Cain's punishment is to be נָע וָנָד (nāʿ wānād, "a wanderer and a fugitive"); both words describe aimless swaying movement. The name of the land where he settles, Nod, comes from the same root, so that the wanderer comes to live in the land of wandering. Cain's reply in Genesis 4:13 (“My punishment is greater than I can bear.”) is a double entendre, and can be read either as a complaint that his punishment is too heavy to bear, or as an admission that his iniquity is too great to be forgiven.

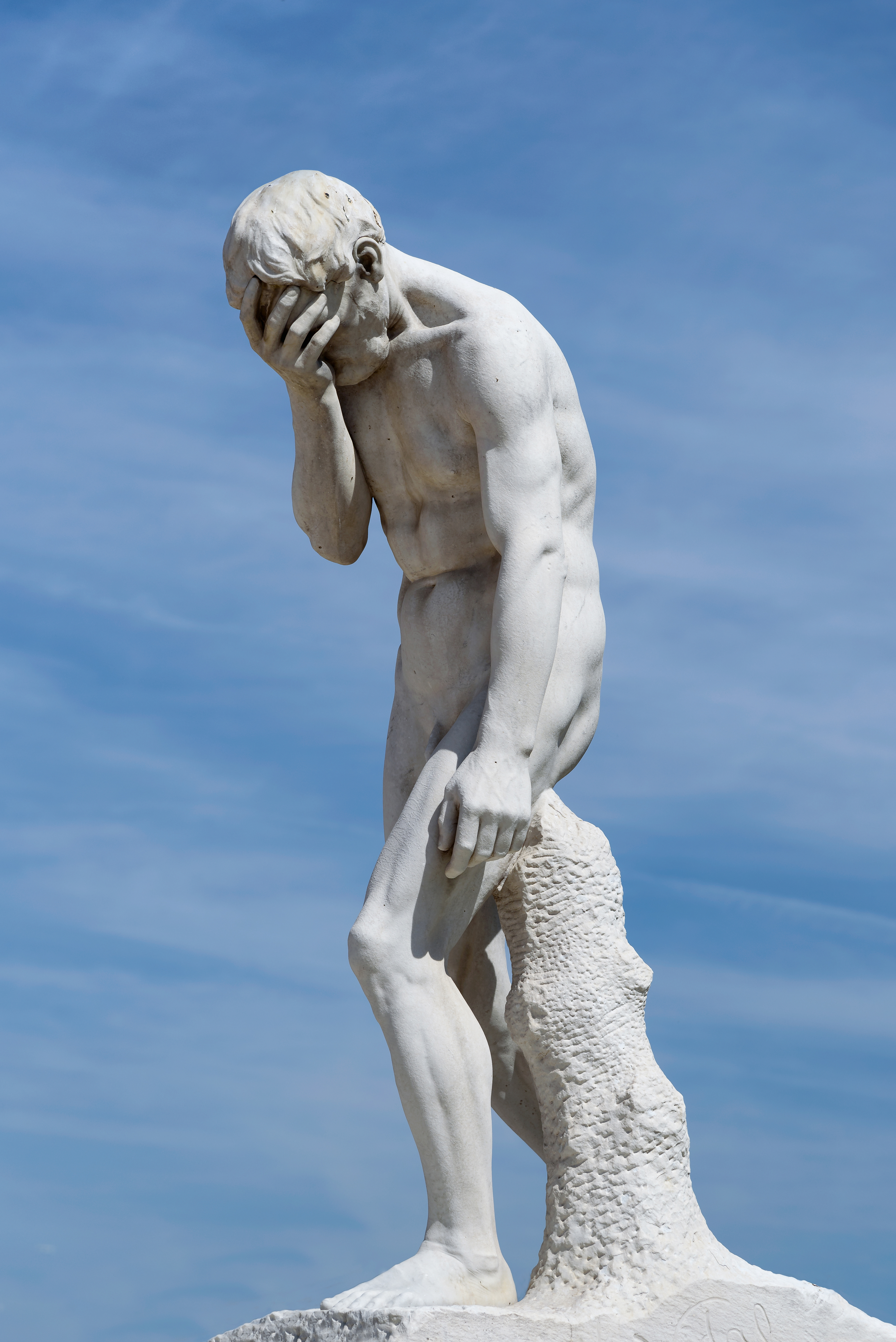
This statue in the Tuilleries Garden by the Louvre is actually titled "Caïn venant de tuer son frère Abel" and shows Cain after killing his brother Abel.

The mark placed on Cain is a sign of protection and not the stigma suggested by the English idiom "mark of Cain". The text does not specify what or where it was. Waltke suggests it could have been a protective tattoo. "Whoever finds me will kill me" could refer to the practice of blood feud, in which the clan avenged a murdered member, as in the Middle Assyrian laws.

Who else might have found Cain, and where his wife came from, is a popular question. Hamilton notes that critical scholars see in it evidence that the Cain and Abel story was once independent of the Adam and Eve narrative, but himself prefers to take Cain's wife and potential killers as his own siblings. McKeown sees this as "further evidence that the narrator was not answering the sorts of questions that people ask in the 21st century but was addressing issues of his own generation, and any attempt to provide one would be speculative and debatable".

== Other traditions ==
=== Coptic ===
According to the Coptic Book of Adam and Eve (at 2:1–15), and the Syriac Cave of Treasures, Abel's body, after many days of mourning, was placed in the Cave of Treasures, before which Adam and Eve, and descendants, offered their prayers. In addition, the Sethite line of the Generations of Adam swear by Abel's blood to segregate themselves from the unrighteous.

=== Latter-day Saint ===
The Book of Moses in the Pearl of Great Price describes the seed of Cain as "black" (Moses 7:22), without explicitly stating whether this description is symbolic or literal. While some early church leaders interpreted this to imply that all people of African descent were descendants of Cain (for example, Brigham Young taught that The Mark of Cain could be seen "on the countenance of every African" and used this interpretation as part of the rationale to bar Black men from priesthood ordination in the 19th and 20th centuries), the modern leadership of The Church of Jesus Christ of Latter-day Saints has formally disavowed such teachings. An official Church statement on race declares that the Church "disavows the theories advanced in the past that black skin is a sign of divine disfavor or curse" and affirms that "all are alike unto God" (2 Nephi 26:33).

In Latter-day Saint theology, Cain is considered to be the quintessential Son of Perdition, the father of secret combinations (i.e. secret societies and organized crime), as well as the first to hold the title Master Mahan meaning master of [the] great secret, that [he] may murder and get gain.

=== Sethian ===
In the Apocryphon of John, a work used in Sethianism, Cain and Abel are Archons, being the offspring of the lesser god or Demiurge called Yaldabaoth, placed over the elements of fire, wind, water and earth. In this narrative their true names are Yahweh and Elohim, but they are given their earthly names as a form of deception.

=== Hermetic ===
A treatise on Christian Hermeticism, Meditations on the Tarot: A Journey into Christian Hermeticism, describes the biblical account of Cain and Abel as a myth, in that it expresses, in a form narrated for a particular case, an "eternal" idea. It argues that brothers can become mortal enemies through the very fact that they worship the same God in the same way. According to the author, the source of religious wars is revealed. It is not the difference in dogma or ritual which is the cause, but the "pretention to equality" or "the negation of hierarchy."

=== Mandaean ===
According to Mandaean beliefs and scriptures including the Qulasta, the Book of John and Genzā Rabbā, Abel is cognate with the angelic soteriological figure Hibil Ziwa, (Classical Mandaic: ࡄࡉࡁࡉࡋ ࡆࡉࡅࡀ, sometimes translated "Splendid Hibel"), who is spoken of as a son of Hayyi or of Manda d-Hayyi, and as a brother to Anush (Enosh) and to Sheetil (Seth), who is the son of Adam. Elsewhere, Anush is spoken of as the son of Sheetil, and Sheetil as the son of Hibil, where Hibil came to Adam and Eve as a young boy when they were still virgins, but was called their son. Hibil is an important lightworld being (uthra) who conquered the World of Darkness. As Yawar Hibil, he is one of multiple figures known as Yawar (Classical Mandaic: ࡉࡀࡅࡀࡓ, lit. 'Helper'), being so named by and after his father.

=== Serpent seed interpretation ===
The serpent seed interpretation for Cain being capable of murder is that he may have been the offspring of a fallen angel or Satan himself, rather than being from Adam. This is rejected by mainstream theologians because the first sentence in the narrative (Genesis 4:1) describes Cain being conceived by Eve with Adam.

== Legacy and symbolism ==
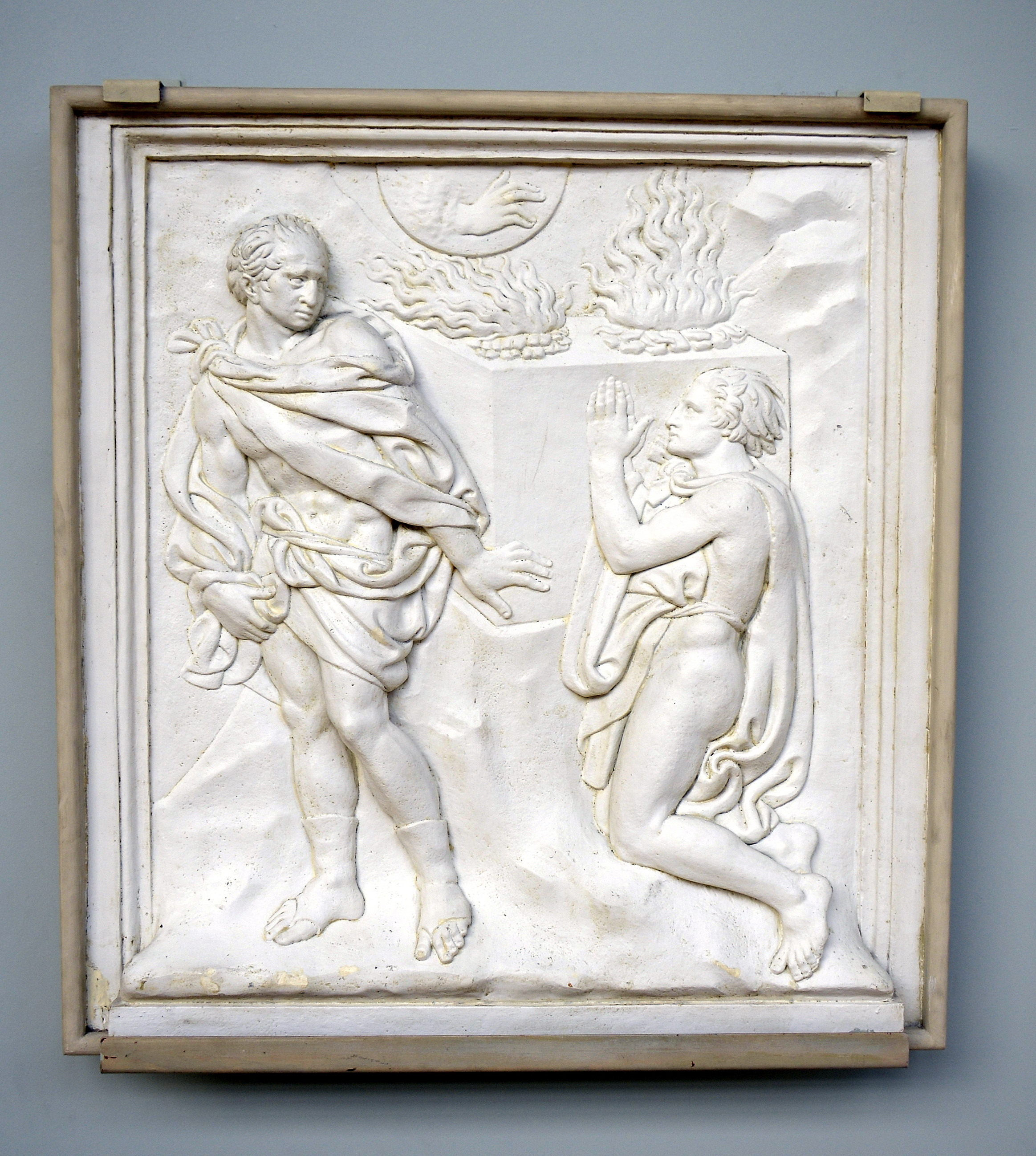
Cain and Abel. Plaster cast after bronze (1425–1438) by Jacopo Della Quercia (1374–1438), Bologna, Italy. National Museum of Scotland, Edinburgh

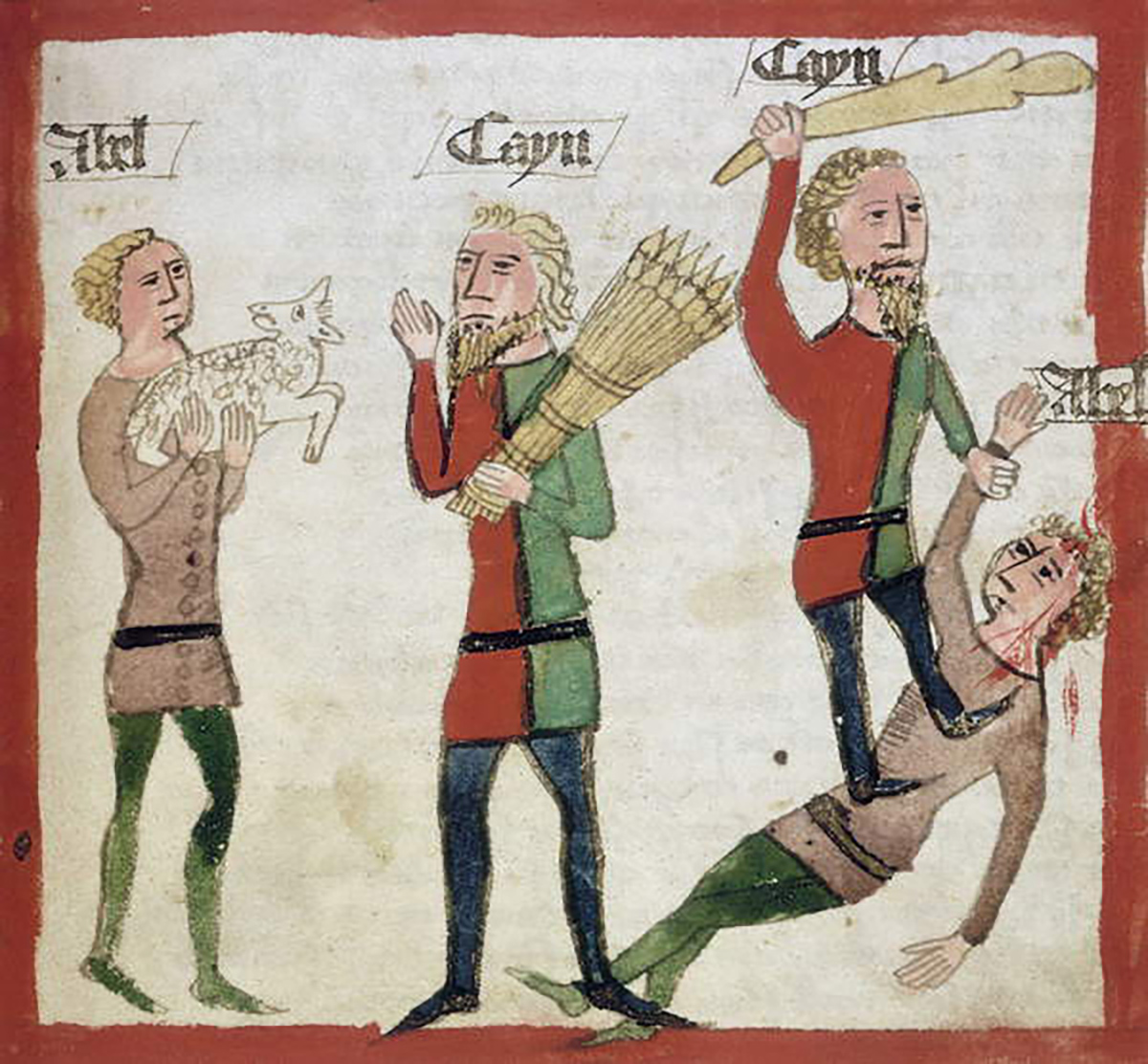
Cain and Abel, 15th-century German depiction from Speculum Humanae Salvationis

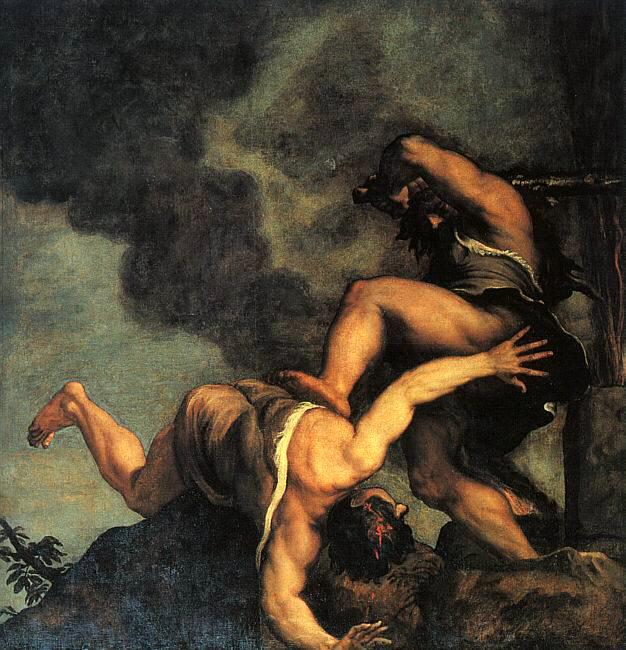
Cain and Abel, 16th-century painting by Titian

Allusions to Cain and Abel as an archetype of fratricide appear in numerous references and retellings, through medieval art and Shakespearean works up to present day fiction.

There were other, minor traditions concerning Cain and Abel, of both older and newer date. The apocryphal Life of Adam and Eve tells of Eve having a dream in which Cain drank his brother's blood. In an attempt to prevent the prophecy from happening the two young men are separated and given different jobs.

=== Cultural references ===
==== Early and medieval literature ====
The apocryphal Life of Adam and Eve tells of Eve having a dream in which Cain drank his brother's blood. In an attempt to prevent the prophecy from happening, the two young men are separated and given different jobs.

In the Old English classic poem Beowulf (c. 1000 CE), the monstrous Grendel and his mother are said to be descended from Cain.

Multiple plays allude to the story. In William Shakespeare's Hamlet, the characters King Claudius and King Hamlet are parallels of Cain and Abel. The expression "Cain-coloured beard" (Cain and Judas were traditionally considered to have red or yellow hair) is used in Shakespeare's The Merry Wives of Windsor (1602).

==== Folklore ====
A medieval legend has Cain arriving at the Moon, where he eternally settled with a bundle of twigs. This was originated by the popular fantasy of interpreting the shadows on the Moon as a face. An example of this belief can be found in Dante Alighieri's Inferno (XX, 126) where the expression "Cain and the twigs" is used as a kenning for "moon".

In Mormon folklore a second-hand account relates that an early Mormon leader, David W. Patten, encountered a very tall, hairy, dark-skinned man in Tennessee who said that he was Cain. The account states that Cain had earnestly sought death but was denied it, and that his mission was to destroy the souls of men. The recollection of Patten's story is quoted in Spencer W. Kimball's The Miracle of Forgiveness, a popular book within the Church of Jesus Christ of Latter-day Saints. This widespread Mormon belief is further emphasized by an account from Salt Lake City in 1963 which stated that "One superstition is based on the old Mormon belief that Cain is a black man who wanders the earth begging people to kill him and take his curse upon themselves (M, 24, SLC, 1963)."

==== Art ====
Like other prominent biblical figures, Cain and Abel appear in many works of art, including works by Titian, Peter Paul Rubens and William Blake.

==== Literature ====
Many novels and plays feature the characters or are closely based on Cain and Abel. Lord Byron also rewrote and dramatized the story in his own play Cain (1821), viewing Cain as symbolic of a sanguine temperament, provoked by Abel's hypocrisy and sanctimony. Victor Hugo's poem "La Conscience" (1853, part of the La Légende des siècles collection) tells of Cain and his family fleeing from God's wrath. Fernand Cormon’s painting Cain, inspired by Victor Hugo’s poem, was the sensation of the 1880 Paris salon. Miguel de Unamuno's 1917 novel Abel Sánchez: A Story of a Passion is a re-telling of the Cain and Abel story. John Steinbeck's 1952 novel East of Eden (also a 1955 film) refers in its title to Cain's exile and contains discussions of the Cain and Abel story which then play out in the plot. James Baldwin's 1957 short story, "Sonny's Blues", has been seen as alluding to the Cain and Abel story. Author Daniel Quinn, first in his novel Ishmael (1992) and later in The Story of B (1996), proposes that the story of Cain and Abel is an account of early Semitic herdsmen observing the beginnings of what he calls totalitarian agriculture, with Cain representing the first 'modern' agriculturists and Abel the pastoralists. The 2008 Danish stage play Biblen discusses and reenacts various Biblical stories, including Abel's murder by Cain. José Saramago's 2009 novel Cain (novel) is an ironical re-telling of Cain's history. In the SCP series, an anomaly named Able (with the codename SCP-076) is based on Abel.

==== Graphic Novels ====
In 1989, Neil Gaiman made the two recurring characters in his graphic novel series The Sandman. Cain appears as the ultimate antagonist of the comic book series The Strange Talent of Luther Strode (2011). Abel is depicted in the manga Record of Ragnarok as a supporter of Adam during his fight with Zeus in the second round. He has seemingly reconciled with Cain by the time the events of the story take place.

==== Film and television ====
In Darren Aronofsky's allegorical film Mother! (2017), the characters "Oldest Son" and "Younger Brother" represent Cain and Abel, respectively. In Dallas (1978), Bobby and J.R. Ewing have been described as variations of Cain and Abel. More direct references include the appearance of Cain and Abel as characters in DC Comics since the 1950s. A "Mark of Cain" is featured in the TV series Supernatural (2005), and Cain appears as a character. The adult animated series Hazbin Hotel features Abel as a character voiced by Patrick Stump.

==== Music ====
The Bruce Springsteen song "Adam Raised a Cain" (1978) invokes the symbolism of Cain. It is also the title of a season 2 episode of Terminator: The Sarah Connor Chronicles.

American heavy metal band Avenged Sevenfold has a song called "Chapter Four" (2003) which is based on the story of Cain and Abel. American heavy metal band Danzig has a song named "Twist of Cain" which lyrically is inspired by the story of Cain and Abel. British rock band Oasis has a song written by frontman Liam Gallagher called "Guess God Thinks I'm Abel", a reference to his infamously tempestuous relationship to brother and bandmate Noel Gallagher.

Country music group 4 Runner's song "Cain's Blood" (1995) uses Cain and Abel as a metaphor for the struggle between good and evil in the song's narrator.

==== Games ====
The role-playing game Vampire: the Masquerade (1991) refers to vampires as "Cainites" after Cain, who is referred to as the first vampire. Cain appears as a playable character in The Binding of Isaac (2011), a roguelike action-adventure game, as well as its 2014 remake The Binding of Isaac: Rebirth. In Shin Megami Tensei: Devil Survivor, the main character Kazuya is the reincarnation of Abel.

== See also ==
- Biblical figures in Islamic tradition
- Biblical narratives and the Qur'an
- Debate between sheep and grain, Sumerian creation myth that has been compared to the story of Cain and Abel
- Debate between Winter and Summer, Sumerian creation myth that has been compared to the story of Cain and Abel
- Nabi Habeel Mosque, considered to be the burial-place of Abel
- Seth, third son of Adam and Eve
- Romulus and Remus
