= Deanna Giulietti =

American actress

Deanna Giulietti is an American actress and internet personality.

== Career ==
Giulietti performed on the Norwegian Cruise Line production of Jersey Boys.

Giuletti joined TikTok in 2020, after losing her job due to the COVID-19 lockdowns. In 2021, she was able to earn more than $500,000 through brand deal videos. Giulietti is well known for her TikTok "outfit of the day" or OOTD videos, which she refers to often as "ooh ta da". She sells affirmation kits based on her videos.

In 2022, she appeared in Fuhgeddabout Christmas starring Justina Valentine on VH1.

In 2025, Giulietti played Josephine "JoJo" Barboza in the world premiere of the musical Mystic Pizza at the Paper Mill Playhouse, based on the 1988 film starring Julia Roberts.

== Personal life ==
Giulietti lives in Harlem. Her father owns a construction company.
