= Joshua Jay =

American magician (born 1981)

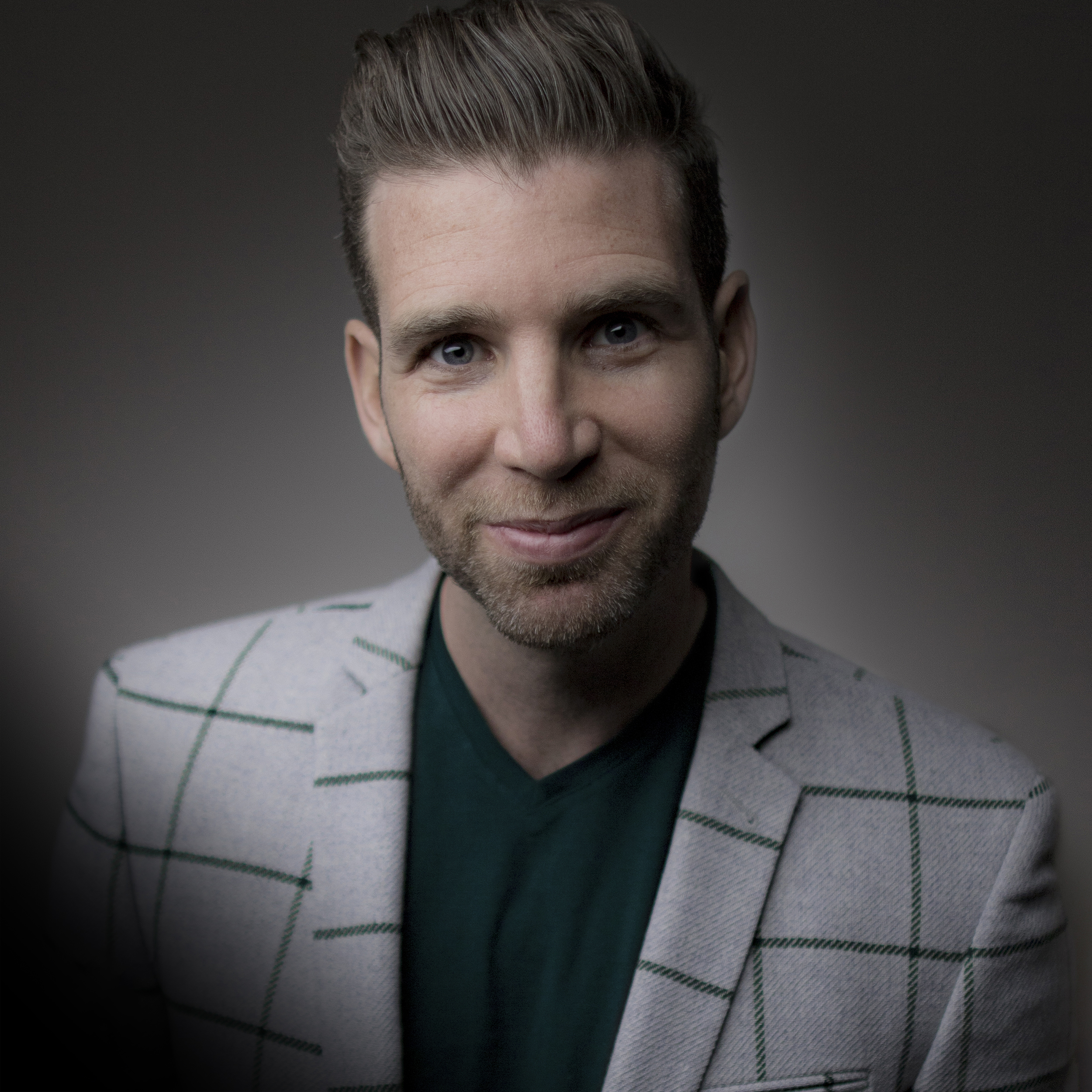
- Born: October 30, 1981 (age 44); Canton, Ohio
- Occupations: Magician, lecturer
- Website: www.joshuajay.com

Joshua Jay (born October 30, 1981) is an American magician, author, and lecturer. He has performed in over 100 countries and was awarded top prize at the World Magic Seminar in 1998. He worked with Penn and Teller on the show Fool Us, and he holds a Guinness World Record for card tricks. Jay has performed on shows including Good Morning America and The Today Show. In January 2018, Jay was recognized by the Society of American Magicians for his contribution to the art of magic.

He resides in New York City.

== Early years ==
Jay attended Canton Country Day School and GlenOak High School in Canton, Ohio, as well as Ohio State University. He was raised Jewish. He became interested in magic when his father showed him a card trick without explaining how it was done.

== Career ==
Jay has designed illusions for stage and screen, including a collaboration with HBO for Game of Thrones. He was consulted by the United States Postal Service for the design of the Magic postage stamp series.

On January 30, 2016, at the Columbus Magi-Fest, Jay set the Guinness World Record for Most Selected Cards Found from a Shuffled Deck in One Minute. He found 21 cards, a record that still stands.

Jay has researched what he classifies as "Tragic Magic," tricks fatal to magicians, assistants, or spectators. He has delivered keynote addresses on the history of magic at museums across the United States, and written an article on the subject for Gibiciere.

Jay appeared at the 2008 Inaugural Ball for former President Barack Obama, and has also performed privately for former President Clinton.

In 2008, Jay and friend Andi Gladwin founded Vanishing Inc. Magic, a manufacturer and retailer of props for magicians. Vanishing Inc. is currently one of the largest magic shops in the world, with warehouse and shipping operations in the US and Europe.

== Author ==
Jay majored in creative non-fiction at Ohio State University. His senior thesis became The Amazing Book of Cards. His other books include MAGIC: The Complete Course, The Amazing Book of Cards, Big Magic for Little Hands, and How Magicians Think: Misdirection, Deception, and Why Magic Matters. He has authored a dozen books for magicians and served for 12 years as Tricks Editor at MAGIC Magazine. Nearly all his books have been translated into other languages. He has also published titles through his company with magician Andi Gladwin.

- "Overlap" (2005)
- "A Teens Routines" (1998)
- "Joshua Jay's Magic Atlas" (1999)
- "Destroyers: The Magic of Troy Hooser" (2001)
- "Session: The Magic of Joel Givens" (2004)
- "Magic: The Complete Course (Book & DVD)" (2008)
- "Joshua Jay's Amazing Book Of Cards (Book & DVD)" (2010) (translated into German, Japanese, and French)
- "Moments: More Magic of Troy Hooser" (2010)
- Jay was a featured contributor in The Linking Ring magazine in May 2010 (he also appeared on that issue's cover)

== TV appearances ==
- Discovery Channel's Grand Illusions: The Story of Magic
- Fox Network's Lance Burton's Young Magician's Showcase
- NHK's Magic of America (Japanese National Television)
- NBC's TODAY SHOW (two appearances)
- ABC's Good Morning America
- The Daily Buzz (broadcast on the Spike Network)
- Brad Meltzer's Decoded (Broadcast on the History Channel)
- The CW's Penn & Teller: Fool Us (Episode: Teller Plays with a Full Deck)

== Awards ==
First place awards include:

- 2011 Merlin Literary Achievement Award
- World Magic Seminar, 1998 First Place Champion (Presented by Lance Burton)
- International Battle of Magicians (twice, 1996 and 1998)
- Columbus Magi Fest
- Kleinman Incentive Award, Most Promising Youth (SAM National Convention)
- Best Published Trick, Award for Creativity (The Linking Ring magazine)
- Youngest magician to write One-Man-Parade (twenty page exposition of original effects) in The Linking Ring magazine
- Society of American Magicians Close-Up Magician of the Year Award 2011
