= Carisa Hendrix =

Canadian magician, comedian, and fire eater

- Hendrix in 2025
- Born: 1987 (age 38–39); Prince Albert, Saskatchewan, Canada
- Other name: Lucy Darling
- Citizenship: Canadian
- Education: Alberta College of Art and Design
- Occupations: Magician, stunt performer, model, actor
- Known for: Fire eating and magic
- Awards: Best Comedy Magic Show at the Melbourne Magic Festival

Carisa Hendrix (born 1987) is a Canadian magician, comedian, and fire eater who often performs in the persona of Lucy Darling, inspired by the wisecracking socialite characters from the Golden Age of Hollywood.

== Personal life ==
Hendrix was born in Prince Albert, Saskatchewan, in 1987. They grew up and are based in Calgary.

Hendrix's interest in magic began while watching a David Copperfield special with their father at the age of six or seven. Later, while volunteering at a library, they created a well-received magic trick involving library cards.

At the age of 16, Hendrix was kicked out of the family home. Needing to make money, they worked a variety of retail jobs, and at a haunted house for $50 per night, performing a ten minute set using skills learned from sideshow performers at a youth summer arts program, such as fire eating.

Hendrix began booking gigs, learning additional skills such as stilt walking, which allowed them to leave retail jobs and focus on performing. They incorporated a comedic flair, combining magic with circus arts.

In 2007, Hendrix was accepted at the Alberta College of Art and Design, studying a variety of performance skills including acting, magic, vaudeville, burlesque and modeling.

Their career skyrocketed following an invitation by an Italian world record television show to break the record for Torch Teething, which is holding a flaming torch between the teeth.

Hendrix identifies as gay, non-binary, and a drag queen.

== Performing career ==
Hendrix was the subject of the 2016 Super Channel documentary Girl on Fire.

Hendrix has been profiled in major media for their success in magic, a field which has historically been male dominated.

Hendrix has been featured repeatedly at the Melbourne Magic Festival.

In 2019, Hendrix was named artist-in-residence at the Chicago Magic Lounge and appeared on the Penn and Teller: Fool Us television show.

In 2020, Hendrix was featured in the Calgary Herald "Celebrating 20 inspiring and compelling Calgarians."

As of October 2025, Hendrix has 1.5 million TikTok followers.

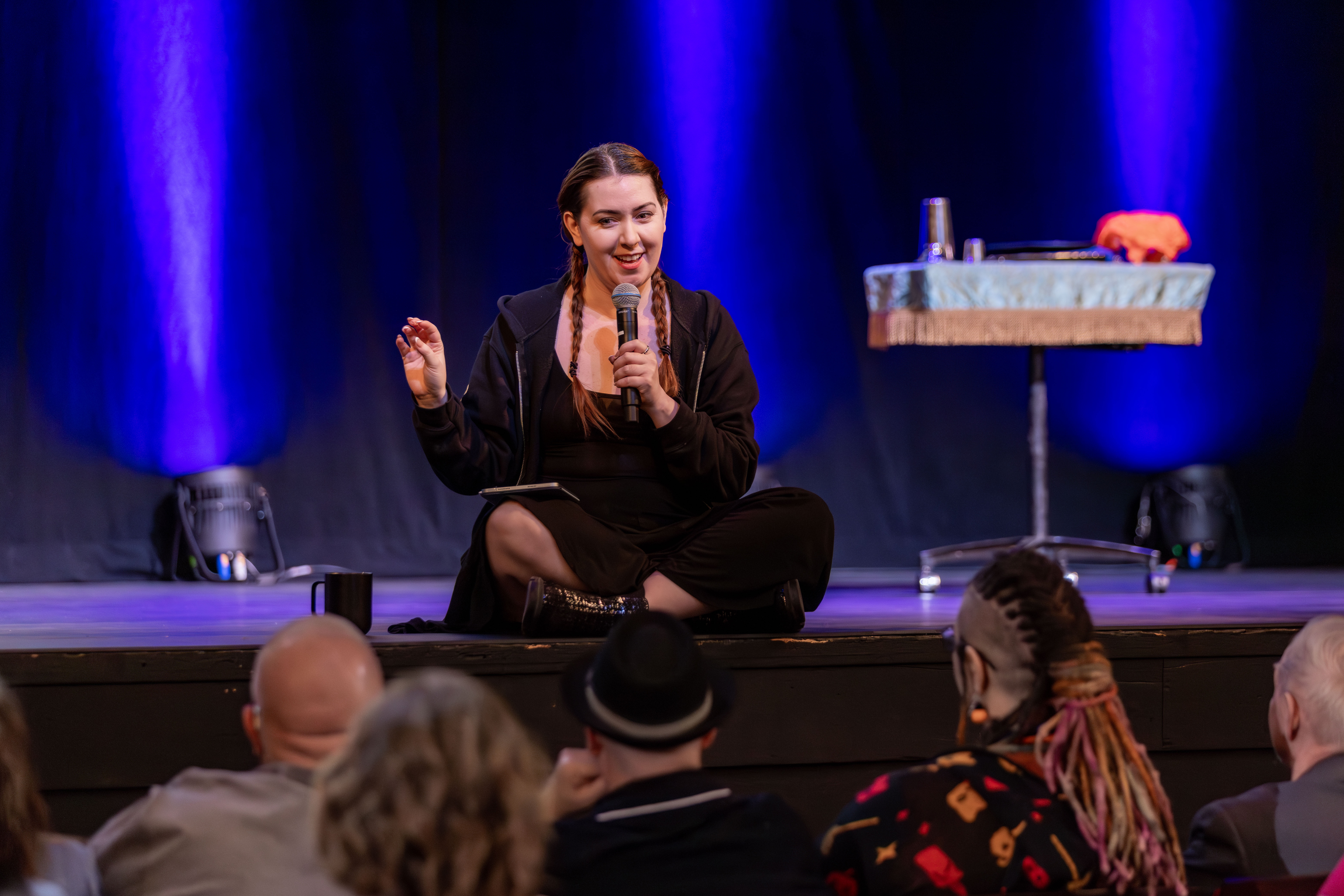
Hendrix during a pre-show talkback

In December 2025, Hendrix performed at the MGM Grand Las Vegas Underground Theatre with Sarah Hester Ross.

Hendrix is a regular performer at The Magic Castle, in Hollywood, California, performing as Lucy Darling, the Mistress of Magic: a sharp-tongued, comedic magician partly based on Dorothy Parker.

== Awards and recognition ==
In 2012, Hendrix set the Guinness World Record for torch teething, which was featured in both the Guinness Book of World Records in 2014, and Ripley's Believe it or Not! in 2015. The fire was held in their mouth for two minutes and one second.

In 2017, Hendrix won the Melbourne International Comedy Festival Award and the Award for Best Comedy Show at The Melbourne Magic Festival. In 2019, they won the Slaight Family Foundation's Canadian Rising Star Award.
