= Magic convention =

Gathering of students of the art of magic

A magic convention is a gathering of professional magicians, magical hobbyists, dealers, collectors of magical apparatus, books and ephemera, and other students of the art of magic. It provides a place for lectures of subjects related to the craft, as well as a series of sample performances of noted or innovative techniques. Many conventions also hold competitions to judge who excels at a particular style, and present awards in various categories such as sleight of hand, card tricks, mentalism, and stage illusions. The largest magic convention is The Blackpool Magician's Convention which is attended by over 3,500 magicians.

== List of well-known magic conventions ==
=== International ===
- The Blackpool Magic Convention, Blackpool, England. Held every February.
- FISM (Fédération Internationale des Sociétés Magiques) - It is hosted every three years in a different city in the world
- The Session, annual three-day convention held in London, organized by Vanishing Inc. Magic.
- The Event 19–20 September 2020. The UK's premiere convention for mentalism, organised by Vanishing Inc. Magic.
- South Tyneside International Magic Festival Convention
- Philippine International Magic Convention (PIMC), http://www.pimcphp.com, the first international magic convention held at SMX Convention Center SM Aura Premier Taguig City, Philippines, produced and organized by Cecile and Mighty International, http://www.cecilemighty.com, a tribute to DEMILO (Filipino Magician Sword Swallower since the 70s), April 24–26, 2019.
- Fellowship of Christian Magicians, annual week-long convention held in Marion Indiana at Indiana Wesleyan University in the month of July.
- The British Ring Annual Convention September 22 - September 25th 2011: Southport, UK
- Magic Valongo, Valongo, Portugal. Held annually in September, since 1992.
- Society of American Magicians (SAM) Convention. Held annually in early July: ATLANTA June 30 - July 3, 2010; PITTSBURGH July 13–16, 2011; LAS VEGAS 2012; WASHINGTON DC 2013.
- The Shenanigans Magic convention held every 3rd year during the first weekend in May, in Dublin, Ireland.

=== Regional - U.S. ===
- MAGIC Live has been presented eleven times, starting in 2001. Past events were produced by MAGIC Magazine. The 11th and most recent MAGIC Live was held in August 2019, and the next convention is scheduled for August 2020.
- Breakthrough Magic Mystery School Meets Vanishing Inc. July 29–31, Las Vegas, organised by Vanishing Inc. Magic
- MagicStars June 5–7, 2020, Columbus, Ohio. World's first magic convention for young magicians and their families, organised by Vanishing Inc. Magic
- The International Brotherhood of Magicians Annual Convention. Late June through Early July.
- Abbott's Get Together, an annual gathering in Colon, Michigan, founded in 1937 by Percy Abbott and Recil Bordner.
- Michigan Magic Day is an Annual Magic Convention which started in 1970 and is hosted each year by a different magic club in Michigan.
- Midwest Magic Jubilee, founded in 1956 in Missouri
- Magifest, begun in 1931, one of the most historic and longest-running annual conventions, currently held in Columbus, OH. Organized by Vanishing Inc. Magic.
- Magistrorum is a bizarre magic and mentalism convention created by Andrew deRuiter in 2020. Magistrorum
- TAOM (Texas Association of Magicians)
- Winter Carnival of Magic, Tennessee
- KIDabra International, The Association of Family and Kidshow Performers: Meets Every August
- Portland Magic Jam, Annual 3-day magic convention in Oregon. www.PDXMagicJam.com. Lectures, stage & close up shows, dealers, panel discussion.
- AbraCORNdabra Magic Convention, The Midwests PREMIERE Magic Convention in Des Moines, Iowa, held annually the second weekend of September. Produced by Steve "Tiny" Daly & Mikayla Oz.
- Pacific Coast Association of Magicians PCAM - Pacific Coast Association of Magicians. Held annually for 89 years.

=== No Longer Running ===
- VISMAYAM 2008 May 1–4, 2008: Thiruvananthapuram, Kerala, INDIA* Oceanside Magic Invitational Convention on Cape Cod, held annually in April. Produced by Markus and Angelique Steelgrave
- Magic-con Bi-annual magic convention hosted in San Diego by Dan and Dave
- Magicians Alliance of Eastern States, (M.A.E.S.) An Annual three day North Eastern US convention: Meets every August or September.
- FUNARAMA, A two/three day convention for magicians and clowns: Meets Every July
- Bob Littles Super Sunday, A One Day Convention with lots of Dealers, an Auction, a Lecture, A Social Hour, and a Show : Meets Every June and November
- Salt Lake City Magic Jam, Annual 3-day magicians' weekend in SLC, Utah. Lectures, stage & close up shows, dealers, panel discussion.
- Metro-Magic, annual October convention run by Bill Wisch, Bob Solari, and Carl Bajor and located in Northeastern New Jersey
- S.E.A.M. Magic Convention, Atlanta, GA (Southeastern Association of Magicians) Hosted every summer in a different southeastern city.
- C.U.M.C.I.S - Close-up Magic Convention in Sussex (yearly magic convention in Haywards Heath in Sussex) https://web.archive.org/web/20110321160707/http://www.paulgordon.net/cumcis.html
- The International Magic Convention, London (Ron MacMillan's) http://www.internationalmagic.com. [Every November, London UK - ran from 1972 to 2014]
- The Southern England Magic Convention, [Bournemouth, England] Every January. https://web.archive.org/web/20080515212908/http://www.semagicconvention.com/
- The Saint-Vincent Casino Magical Convention (2010 Convention entries in the Guinness World Records of London)
- The Northern Magic Circle Convention (2010 Convention to be held at the Marine Hall, Fleetwood, Lancashire) https://web.archive.org/web/20100310074840/http://www.northernmagic.co.uk/
- World Magic Seminar February 28 - March 3, 2010: Las Vegas, NV, USA
- Achambha 2008 Jadu Sansthan Agra August 28–30, 2008: Agra Uttar Pradeh, India
- PCAM - Pacific Coast Association of Magicians. Held annually for 85 years in the Summer.

=== Invitational ===
Some small conferences have great prestige within the industry, but are not open to the public:

- FFFF - Fechter's Finger-Flicking Frolic, held on the east coast of the United States since the 1970s, and limited to fewer than 200 hand-picked attendees.

== Reports and Listing ==
The MAGIC Magazine Convention Guide provides a comprehensive list of upcoming magic conventions and allows events to be compared to each other based on dates, price, location, number of events, etc. The site is run by MAGIC Magazine, the world's largest-selling magazine for magicians

Independently run Magic Convention Guide which was the first dedicated online guide to Magic Conventions, and still provides news and updates on conventions, as well as live coverage of some events. They also provide guides to some conventions, listing places to stay, eat, and shop.

== Magic societies ==
Some conventions are hosted by specific magician associations or societies. For example, the two oldest and largest magic organizations in the United States, are the Society of American Magicians and the International Brotherhood of Magicians. The Home Counties Magical Society ran the 'Junior Days', a convention specifically aimed at younger magicians, now having been replaced with the event run by The Magic Circle. The College of Magic is a unique society in magic - offering a 6-year specialist diploma course in magic to students aged 10 and over.

Other Magic-related organizations are:

- Australian Institute of Magic
- Australian Society of Magicians
- Fellowship of Christian Magicians, with many local chapters
- College of Magic - one of the largest Societies in South Africa
- The Professional Magic Dealers Association
- The Magic Circle
- The Home Counties Magical Society
- International Magicians Society
- Pacific Coast Association of Magicians
- Magic Academy, India
- Magic Academy and Magic Club, India

== Awards ==
=== Gold Medal - I.B.M. ===
The most prestigious "stage magic" award in the International Brotherhood of Magicians competitions is the I.B.M. Gold Medal International Award of Excellence in Stage Performance. Along with other annual awards such as First place, Second place, etc., there is a possibility of this special Gold Medal award being issued if the judges decide that they have witnessed a contest performance of Gold Medal quality. As of 2019 only nine Gold Medal awards have been made, to:

- Lance Burton, 1980
- Howard Hale, 1985
- James Cielen, 1988
- Jade aka Fanny Tjin, 1990
- Greg Frewin, 1993
- George Saterial, 1999
- Keiko Muto, 2002
- Arthur Trace, 2005
- Zhou Zhou and Yuan Yuan, 2019

=== Gold Cups – I.B.M. ===
What is commonly regarded as the most prestigious "close-up" award in the International Brotherhood of Magicians competitions is the I.B.M. Gold Cups International Award of Excellence in Close-up Performance. Along with other annual awards such as first place, second place, third place, etc., there is a possibility of this special Gold Cups award being issued if the judges decide that they have witnessed a contest performance of Gold Cups quality. As of July 2017, seven Gold Cups awards have been made, to:

- David Williamson, 1981
- Johnny Ace Palmer, 1983
- Joe Givan, 1987
- Giovanni Livera, 1991
- Steve Bedwell, 1994
- Oscar Munoz, 1999
- Chase Curtis, 2003

=== Magic Castle ===
Each year the Hollywood-based Magic Castle club gives out awards at a black-tie dinner.

=== Grand Prix - FISM ===
The most prestigious award given out at FISM is the Grand Prix. The Grand Prix is generally considered to be the most prestigious competition award in the industry. FISM is held once every three years and may award the Grand Prix to the best stage magician and best close-up magician at each competition, but need not give out either award at any given competition.

Previous winners of the Grand Prix include:

2009

- Stage: Hajnóczy Soma (Hungary)
- Close-up: Shawn Farquhar (Canada)

2006

- Stage: Pilou (France)
- Close-up: Rick Merrill (United States)

2003

- Stage: Norbert Ferré (France)
- Close-up: Jason Latimer (United States)

=== Award duplication ===
Because there is little standardization in naming awards within the industry, some smaller festivals often give awards that have the same titles as the awards at larger conventions. Less scrupulous magicians will often claim that they have a prestigious award, without indicating its origin, or declare themselves an 'award-winning' act, implying a high quality of performance. Self-claims of fame and notability must therefore sometimes be taken with a grain of salt.

There are organisations that randomly give out awards to famous magicians in different countries, to boast their own organisation's importance. This is a bit awkward, as it many times is difficult for the performer to know if it is a real organisation or not, and might become embarrassing for the performer, should he use such award in their marketing and someone later track its origin.

Magicians who are genuinely notable or successful in magic contests are likely to be honored by FISM, IBM, SAM, The Magic Circle (London, England) or the International Magic Convention Close Up Competition (London).

== Dealer rooms ==
Most conventions have a "dealers room", where magical supplies are sold, along with books describing various techniques. While the public might be invited to view certain performances, one must be registered at the convention to visit the dealers room.
