= David Stone (magician) =

French artist

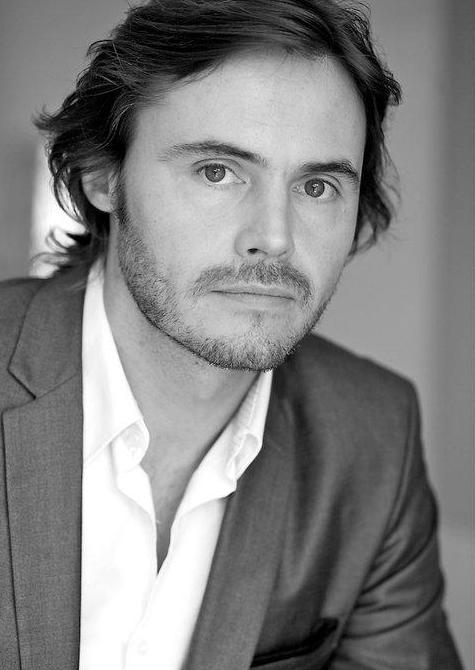
- Born: David Muller; Eaubonne, France
- Other name: Klek Entos
- Education: Amiens University (Philosophy)
- Occupations: Magician, actor, writer, lecturer, producer

David Stone (recently known as Klek Entos) his original name is David Muller. He is a French actor, writer, lecturer, producer and magician specialising in close-up magic and coin magic.

== Early life and career ==
David Stone was born in Eaubonne, France. He was 19 years old when a school friend showed him magic tricks and taught him card manipulation. At the age of 23, Stone won the Lex Diavol, a regional contest for magicians organised annually in France by FFAP.

When he was 24, Stone won the Gold Dove (close-up category) award at the European championships of magic organized in France. In the same year, he won the Close-up Grand Prix of South America in Las Tunas, Cuba.

In 1995, he met the French magician Stéphane Jardonnet who launched his career by producing a video Stone starred in called Basic Coin Magic Vol. 1. This video became the first French magic program ever sold on the American market and became later a best-seller.

After obtaining a degree in Philosophy at the Amiens University, Stone decided to become professional magician. He went to Saint-Tropez and started working in some of the most prestigious restaurants of the Riviera, including seven years in La Voile Rouge, a trendy beach restaurant where he honed his craft.

Stone has gained recognition in the world of professional magicians. Since 1999, he has performed his lecture on the art of table-hopping (professional magic in restaurants) at magic conventions in more than 19 countries and is one of the most popular French magicians outside his country.

His encounter with magician and DVD producer Jean-Luc Bertrand in 2001 produced a successful partnership that has yielded several short films and magic DVDs. Their first co-production, a short movie titled The Real Secrets of Magic, was the winner of the first ever Magic Film Festival in Las Vegas (2006).

In 2003, at the FFFF convention, he was voted as the Most Valuable Performer.

His book Close-up: The Real Secrets of Magic (2005) is a best-seller in France and was sold out in less than 15 days after its release and is now edited in four languages. The DVD The Real Secrets Of Magic (2006) adapted from this book was nominated Best Magic DVD 2006 by Genii and Magie Magazine (DE), with more than 14,000 copies being sold in 13 months.

In August 2006, Stone won third prize at the World Championships of Magic (FISM) in Stockholm, Sweden (Micro-Magic - FISM Award 2006) and was voted in April 2008 the TMW Award for Best Magician 2008 ().

In 2009, he started acting courses at the Studio Pygmalion drama school in Paris, and played in about 30 shorts movies in seven years.

In 2010, the FFFF convention voted Stone as Guest of Honor for FFFF 2012. He became the second French magician to receive this honor in 40 years. In April 2012, he covered the Linking Ring Magazine.

In March 2014, Stone was voted Best Close-up Magician 2014 by the British magic magazine MagicSeen. In June 2015, he covered Magic Magazine.

In 2018, he reached the final of La France a un incroyable talent.

In 2020, he appeared on he 7th season of Penn & Teller: Fool Us. The same year, under the pseudonym of Klek Entos, he also reached the finale of La France a un incroyable talent (and become the first magician in France to reach the final twice) and reveal his identity right after his act.

In 2021, as Klek Entos, he appeared on the 16th season of America's Got Talent and reached the Quarterfinals.

== Filmography (actor) ==
=== Movies ===
- Un Adultère directed by Philippe Harel as David Loussine (2018)
- Mon Roi directed by Maiween as Patron in the restaurant (2014)
- Une nuit directed by Philippe Lefebvre as Customer in the night club (2011)
- Beur sur la ville directed by Djamel Bensalah as A reporter (2010)
- L’été prochain directed by Nadine Trintignant as Kid in the village party (1984)

=== Short-movies ===
- Rue Du Lac directed by Julien Thiverny as Rudy (2018)
- Facteur Humain directed by Axel Chemin as Michel (2018)
- L'Échappée directed by Loïc Richard as The attorney (2017)
- Faded directed by Sam Tanem and Vivien Roeltgen as David (2017)
- The Woman Clothed In The Sun directed by François Gastinel as Cooper (2017)
- Mon Super Tonton directed by Bastien Barbaroux as Ed the bad guy (2017)
- Un Monstre directed by Patrick Beun as Simon (2016)
- Le Bain directed by Capucine Tavoillot and Nicolas Matuszewski as The man (2016)
- La Fantastique Partouze de Pierre directed by Pierrick Gillet as The plumber (2016)
- En Retard directed by Alexandre Legallais as Himself (2016)
- See Emily Play directed by Mathilde Prevost as The drunk man (2015)
- Le Colis directed by Sarah Veysseyre as Victor (2015)
- Seule directed by Andrzej Dambski as The man (2015)
- Thérapie directed by Mahadi Sissoko as John Dowoski (2015)
- Dernière Danse directed by Nash Zetterstrom as Cleve (2015)
- La Cinquième Séance directed by Lucas Genna and Felix Lanaud as The stage manager (2015)
- Shutting Down directed by Hichem Djamai as Tom (2015)
- Mardi Gras directed by Nicolas Duchiron as Franck (2014)
- Père et Fils directed by Tanja Bieri as Mr. Brochot (2014)
- The Rehearsa directed by Simon Lecharny as Bill (2014)
- Les Salauds Ne Dorment Jamais directed by Edouard Vic as Franck (2014)
- La Traversée directed by Coralie Giraudet as The father (2014)
- Adeupa directed by Tania Dafné Tossou as A teacher (2014)
- Dig Into Me directed by Roman Soni as Sam Ferrau (2013)
- Le Pacte directed by Steven Piron as Ulrick (2010)
- Arme de crime directed by Jean-Luc Bertrand as Customer in the bar (2008)
- The Real Secrets of Magic directed by Jean-Luc Bertrand as Himself (2006)

=== Documentaries ===
- Reel Magic Magazine: Numéro 30 - Kozmo Magic (2012)
- The Real Secrets of David Stone - MagicZoom Entertainment/Close-up Magic (2010)
- DVD Special features for the movie L'illusionniste directed by Neil Burger with Edward Norton (2007)
- DVD Special features for the movie Les Maîtres du jeu directed by Damian Nieman with Sylvester Stallone (2005)

== Filmography (magician) ==
- Penguin Live Lecture - P3 Productions (2019)
- The Happy Lecture - MagicZoom Entertainment (2016)
- Mirage - MagicZoom Entertainment (2016)
- Hologram - MagicZoom Entertainment (2015)
- ZENith - MagicZoom Entertainment (2015)
- Stone X - Close-up Magic Entertainment (2013)
- Tool - MagicZoom Entertainment (2011)
- Window - MagicZoom Entertainment/Close-up Magic (2009)
- Cell - MagicZoom Entertainment/Bonne Nouvelle Productions (2008)
- The Real Secrets of Magic Vol. 2 - MagicZoom Entertainment/Close-up Magic (2007)
- The Real Secrets of Magic Vol. 1 - MagicZoom Entertainment/Close-up Magic (2006)
- Live at FFFF - MagicZoom Entertainment (2004)
- Best of the Best Vol. 11 - International Magicians Society (2003)
- Best of the Best Vol. 12 - International Magicians Society (2003)
- Best of the Best Vol. 13 - International Magicians Society (2003)
- Live in Boston - MagicZoom Entertainment (2002)
- Quit Smoking - Magic Boutique (2001)
- David Stone’s Fabulous Close-up Lecture - International magic (1999)
- Coin Magic Vol. 2 - Stéphane Jardonnet Productions/David Stone (1997)
- Génération Imagik Vol. 2 - Joker Deluxe Productions (1996)
- Basic Coin Magic - Stéphane Jardonnet Productions (1995)

== Productions ==
- Co-producer of Yannick Chretien (2009) - MagicZoom Entertainment/Close-up Magic
- Co-producer of Nestor Hato (2008) - MagicZoom Entertainment/Close-up Magic

== Shows ==
- Magie(s) Parallèle(s) 2 with Alexandra Duvivier et Dominique Duvivier - Le Double Fond (2018)
- Stone passe à table (Magic unleashed) - One Man Show - Le Double Fond (2017)
- Magie(s) Parallèle(s) with Alexandra Duvivier et Dominique Duvivier - Le Double Fond (2016)

== Bibliography ==
- Mietek (1998)
- Secrets of Table Hopping (1999)
- Light My Fire (1999)
- X rated (2000)
- Made in France (2001)
- Cocoon (2002)
- Close-up: The Real Secrets of Magic (2005)
