= Tom Stone (magician) =

Swedish magician, editor and author

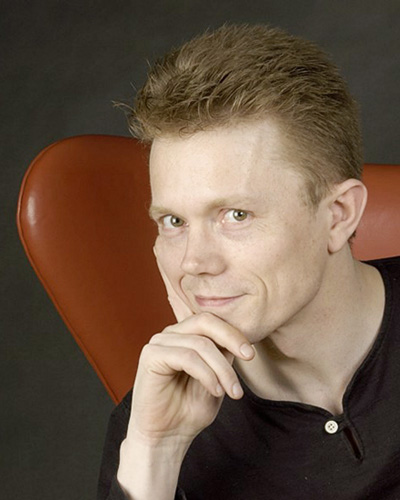
Tom Stone, 2004

Tom Stone is the stage name of Thomas Bengtsson, a Swedish magician, editor and author.

== Biography ==
Stone was born on October 28, 1967, and presently lives in Stockholm, Sweden.

He is best known for writing a series of articles and pamphlets about original magical techniques and plots. He co-wrote a book with magician Lennart Green, contributed material to a book by Jason Alford, and has self-published a series of pamphlets as well as an e-book. He is also editor and publisher of various Swedish magic journals such as "Trollkarlen", and "Dr. Faustus Journal" (1995-).

He has performed at the invitation-only Magic Castle, and in 2000, he was a "performer and speaker" at the FISM "World Championships of Magic" in Lisbon, Portugal.

In 2003, he was a performer and competitor at the International Magic Convention & 20th Close Up competition in Kings Cross, London, where he won £500 and was awarded second place, just behind Japanese-Canadian magician Hayashi.

In June 2010, Stone released a book entitled Vortex, collecting many of the effects he has published in periodicals, his own ebooks and some previously unreleased material with Hermetic Press.

In May 2016, the Academy of Magical Arts in Hollywood awarded Stone the Creative Fellowship.

== Works ==
- The Warpsmith's Toolbox, 1994 (self published)
- Lennart Green's Snap Deal, 1995 (co-written with Lennart Green)
- The Warpsmith Returns, 1996 (self published)
- Self publishing, e-book (self published)
- Tom Stone Caught On Tape
- Vortex (Published through Hermetic Press), June 2010. ISBN 9780945296669
- Maelstrom (Published through Hermetic Press), December 2011. ISBN 9780945296720
