= Jeanette Andrews =

American magician (born 1990)

- Born: 1990 (age 35–36)
- Citizenship: American
- Occupations: Artist, Magician and Speaker

Jeanette Andrews (born 1990) is an American magician, artist and speaker. She is known for her performances and speaking engagements at venues including Harvard, MIT, Yale, and the National Arts Club in New York City. Andrews has been commissioned to stage hundreds of sold-out and standing-room-only performances for Fortune 500 companies and organizations in the United States. Andrews is considered a global leader in both the field of magic and academic artistic works. She has often been the first magician to be nominated or awarded residencies, grants and appointments typically reserved for visual artists and researchers. According to the Chicago Reader, her work is "known across the country for infusing her magic with science, history, and art".

== Career ==
Andrews' interest in magic began at the age of four in suburban Chicago after viewing a Siegfried & Roy magic special on television. Two years later, she presented her first paid magic gig. Beginning at age five she studied magic under the tutelage of master magician Ralph Beck. She later received career guidance from magicians including Eugene Burger and Simon Aronson. In the earliest stages of her career she also met and befriended magician Arthur Trace, who offered her advice that inspired her to carve her path in the field.

In 2016, she had her first performance at the Museum of Contemporary Art Chicago titled "Thresholds: Illusions for the Senses & the Mind". That same year was part of a group show at the Birmingham Museum of Art in Birmingham, AL. She returned to the BMA in 2017 for another group show. Also in 2017, she was Artist-in-Residence at The Institute for Art and Olfaction in Los Angeles, CA which also included her show "Thornapple: Exploring Magic via Scent." Other solo public shows in 2017 included MANA Contemporary Chicago, International Museum of Surgical Science, and a return to the Museum of Contemporary Art Chicago for a show titled "Invisible Roses" which was a commissioned work for the MCA's 50th Anniversary. She expanded her performance schedule to New York City in 2019 with solo shows at the ACE Hotel's Liberty Hall (titled "Invisible Apples") and a hybrid performance/workshop at the Cooper Hewitt, Smithsonian Design Museum (titled "Designing the Impossible"). She also participated in a group show in Norwich, England at the Norfolk and Norwich Festival (one of the oldest city festivals in England) titled "A Magical Fluxus Game". In addition to solo performances and group shows in 2019, Jeanette Andrews also created a sculpture/performance titled "Bottling the Impossible" that was performed in Elmhurst, IL, and Chicago, IL. at the Elmhurst Museum of Art and Mana Contemporary Chicago respectively.

In 2020, like many public performers Andrews made the pivot to virtual performances as a reaction to the COVID-19 pandemic lockdown. She created "Magic By Telephone", a call-in line that guided callers via recorded messages through a magic trick using everyday household items. In addition she worked with Museum of Contemporary Art Chicago on a commission for the "Long Dream" exhibition "Invisible Museums of the Unseen", a citywide public GPS- activated site-specific audio art in Chicago. Andrews' self-published book on this work also became available for sale at Printed Matter in NYC in August 2022.

During the pandemic, she relocated from Chicago to New York City in 2021. That year, she performed online for the American Repertory Theater at Harvard for their "Conjuror's Club" online show. She also participated in the Second Annual Performa Telethon in New York City along with Lee Ranaldo, Michelle Handelman, John Kelly, and Narcissister.

In 2022, she received a Quebec City city-wide public commission for a public audio work for the Quebec City Manif d'Art Biennial titled "Invisible Museums of the Unseen." The same year she also did an installation/performance for CultureLAB LIC in Long Island City, NY titled "Taken by Artificial Surprise".

Andrews expanded her public works with the 2023-2024 body of work consisting of a short film, sculptural kinesthetically transforming book and installation titled "magi.cia.n" which was a commission from the Boca Raton Museum of Art. The short film component of this series, "The Attention" also later became available for public viewing in its entirety on CIFRA, a platform for experimental film and video art. In 2024 she performed the magic portion of the film "The Attention" from "magi.cia.n" at The National Arts Club, New York, NY : "Understanding Fictions" Fellows Show.

In 2023, she also created the solo show "In Plain Listen" which was a commission from the University of Houston's Cynthia Woods Mitchell Center for the Arts. She went on to perform "In Plain Listen" at The National Arts Club in NYC and in an expanded show titled "In Plain Listen and On Wonder" at the British Society of Aesthetics in London England and again at the MIT Museum in Cambridge MA, this time titled "On Wonder...: Featuring 'In Plain Listen'". The work is an experimental music composition and performance. The secret for one of the first magic effects in written history was translated into a Morse-code-based musical notation system to create this score for solo cello. It is performed in tandem with the original magic effect.

== Fellowships, residencies, affiliations and grants ==
Starting in 2024 and continuing into 2025, Andrews became a Visiting Artist at the Massachusetts Institute of Technology Center for Art, Science and Technology. In her role as a Visiting Artist at MIT CAST, she collaborated with faculty members Graham M. Jones and Arvind Satyanarayan to develop an original, interactive, site-specific public performance.

In previous years she was selected and served as a National Arts Club Artist Fellow (2023-2024), she served a Choreodaemonics Microresidency at Brown University (2024), a Mitchell Center Visiting Artist at the University of Houston (2023), a Harvard University metaLab Affiliate (2021-2022) and in 2022 received a NYSCA Individual Artist Grant sponsored by Franklin Furnace Archive of the Pratt Institute. The list of grants, fellowships, and residencies that she has received dates back to 2014.

== Speaking, workshops and lectures ==
In addition to public and private performances Andrews has often been invited to give speaking engagements and lectures dating back to 2017. Among the institutions that she has lectured at include Yale University (2025), Harvard Law School (2024), Harvard Medical School (2023), Columbia University (2023), Harvard Graduate School of Design (2022), Illinois Science Council (2021), Arlington Heights Memorial Library (2020) and the University of Pittsburgh (2019). Her talks often center around what magic and illusion illustrate about cognition and the complexity of the perceptual process. Her workshops, including "Designing the Impossible," combine magic and a problem-solving workshop with design thinking.
