= Magic Christian (magician) =

Austrian magician

Christian Stelzel, known professionally as Magic Christian, is an Austrian professional magician and author. Christian was born on July 17, 1945, and presently lives in Vienna.

He studied industrial design at the University of Applied Arts Vienna. Christian has received many awards, starting with winning first prize at a competition in Weymouth, 1967, and several awards from all over the continent followed. In 1973 he won the first prize in the category of Manipulation at FISM, the world championships in magic. An accomplishment he repeated at FISM 1976 and FISM 1979 (the later time, also winning the category of Invention).

In 1989, Christian became president of the Magic Club of Vienna, and in 2005 the Academy of Magical Art at The Magic Castle, Hollywood, awarded him the "Performing Fellowship" for his performances.

Magic Christian has developed books of magic and magic sets for Piatnik, Austria's renowned playing card, board game and puzzle manufacturer.

In later years, Magic Christian has received acclaim for his thorough historic research on the legendary Johann Nepomuk Hofzinser.
