= Magicians Association of Korea =

Korean trade organization

- Formation: 24 October 2001; 24 years ago
- Headquarters: Pyongyang
- Affiliations: Fédération Internationale des Sociétés Magiques

- Magicians Association of Korea
- Hangul: 조선요술협회
- Hanja: 朝鮮妖術協會
- RR: Joseon yosul hyeophoe
- MR: Chosŏn yosul hyŏphoe

The Magicians Association of Korea (Korean: 조선요술협회) (variously also translated as the DPRK Magicians Association or the Korea Magic Association of DPRK) is the national magicians' association of North Korea.

== Historical background of magic in North Korea ==
Kim Jong-il had made efforts to develop magic on a Juche basis in 1971.Ho jong chol, who works in the youth art organization of propaganda, is a magician that gained attention by the government.

== History of the association ==
it was not until 2001 that a dedicated nationwide magicians' society was established in North Korea. The Magicians Association of Korea was founded on 24 October of that year, with headquarters in Pyongyang and ten branches across Korea. Its goal is to contribute to the development of performance magic in the DPRK, and to foster cooperation with magicians and magicians' organizations abroad.

In 2002, the association was making arrangements to join the International Jugglers' Association, and it was admitted to the Fédération Internationale des Sociétés Magiques in 2012.

== Activities ==
The association has developed magic acts for performance in the DPRK and abroad. These have included Kim Chol's series of large-scale performances at Pyongyang's May Day Stadium in April 2011, and a touring performance in China in August 2011.

== Notable members ==
- Kim Thaek-song (chairman, 2001–)
- Kim Chol (vice-chairman)
