= Arthur Trace =

American magician (born 1979)

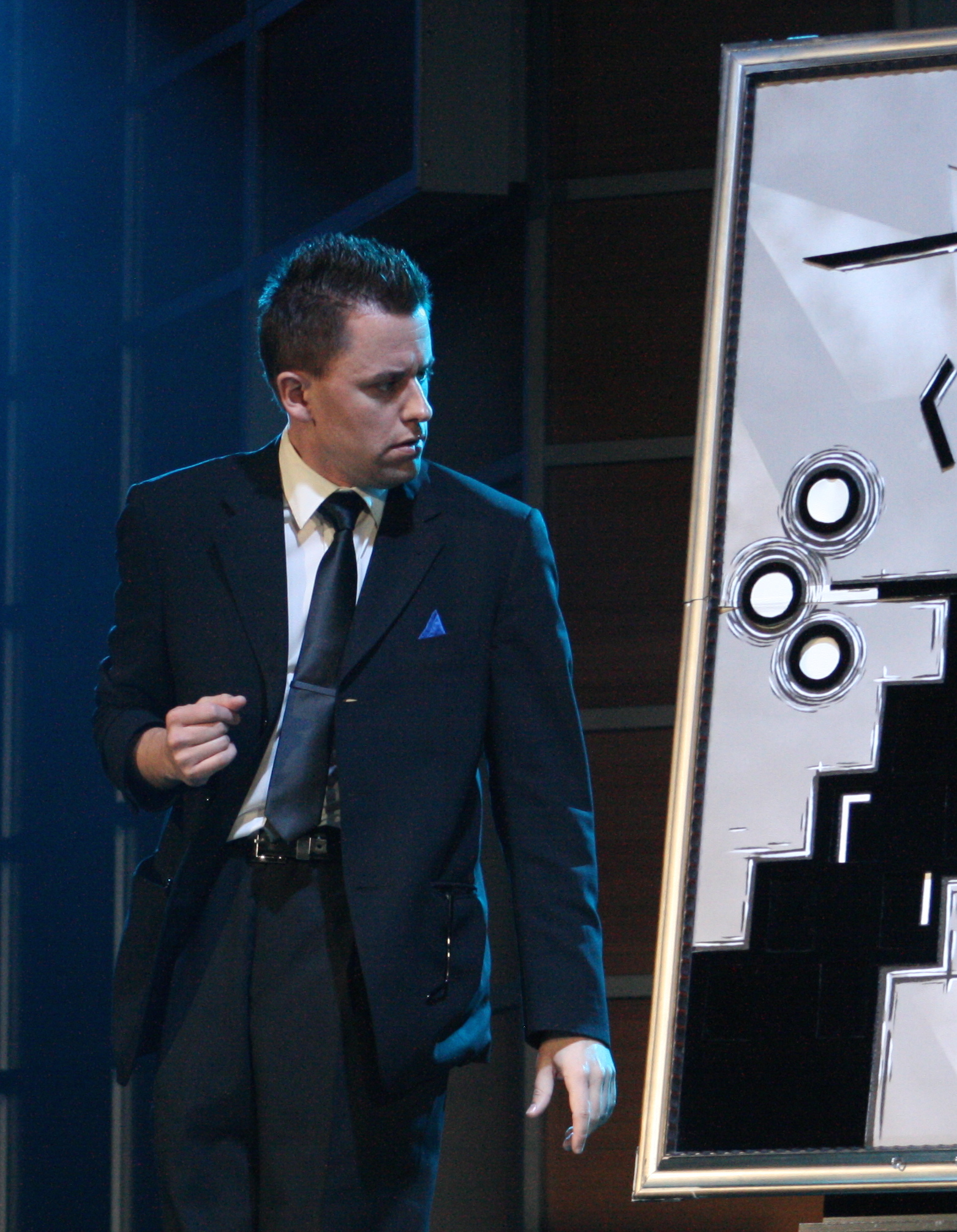
- Trace in 2011 performing "Postmodern Art"
- Born: Arthur Tracz; December 4, 1979 (age 45); Kraków, Poland
- Occupation: Magician

Arthur Trace (born Arthur Tracz December 4, 1979) is an American magician.

His career started to flourish in 2005 when the International Brotherhood of Magicians gave him their highest honor, The Gold Medal International Award of Excellence. The following year he became a FISM World Championship of Magic Award Winner and that led to many international performance opportunities, such as performing for Albert II, Prince of Monaco at The Princess Grace Theatre and appearing multiple times on the French television show Le Plus Grand Cabaret du Monde. Trace also appeared on The World Magic Awards television special and on Masters of Illusion. More recently, he was a featured act at the Wintergarten Theatre in Berlin and produced and starred in his own show onboard The Queen Mary. He currently tours with his show The Artful Deceiver, which is also his tagline.

In addition to being a performer, Trace is an inventor of magic. His effects are published in various magician periodicals. He is also known to occasionally lecture at magic conventions.

He lives in Los Angeles, California.

== Early life ==
Trace was born in Kraków, Poland. His parents immigrated to America in order to escape communism when he was two years old. He grew up in the Northwest Suburbs of Chicago, Illinois and later went on to study advertising at the University of Illinois where he graduated in 2001.

== Awards and nominations ==
- 2005 Gold Medal, International Brotherhood of Magicians (Award)
- 2005 First Place, International Brotherhood of Magicians (Award)
- 2005 People's Choice, International Brotherhood of Magicians (Award)
- 2006 FISM Winner - 3rd Place in Manipulation (Award)
- 2006 Prix Marc Klasser, Monte Carlo Magic Stars (Award)
- 2007 Neil Foster - Bill Baird Award for Excellence in Manipulation (Award)
- 2007 Best Male Cabaret Magic, World Magic Awards (Award)
- 2007 2nd Runner Up, The Genting International Magic Festival (Award)
- 2009 Bronze Lion Award, China Wuqiao International Circus Festival (Award)
- 2015 Stage Magician of The Year, Academy of Magical Arts (Nomination)
