= Roberto Giobbi =

Swiss stage magician

Roberto Giobbi (born May 1, 1959 in Basel) is a professional magician from Switzerland, noted for his many contributions in teaching card magic, such as his five-volume Card College series.

== Life and work ==
After studying literature and linguistics at the University of Basel, Roberto Giobbi first worked as an interpreter and translator, with a fluency in German, English, Italian, French and Spanish. After his success as Vice World Champion in Card Magic at Fédération Internationale des Sociétés Magiques (FISM) in 1988, he turned professional as a magician. He has since been working as an author and lecturer, and has developed an international reputation as a teacher.

Giobbi has written 18 books, and his works have appeared in eight languages. His best-selling five-volume Card College series is considered to be a standard modern textbook for card magic, and is the most widely translated series of books in the history of magic. He has also published articles and essays about magic in more than 50 magazines in Europe and overseas, including essays and columns for 14 consecutive years in Genii magazine. Since 2015, he has been one of the contributors for the Magic Circle of Austria's magazine Aladin.

Giobbi has been a guest of many TV and radio shows, including appearances in Switzerland, Italy, Spain, the USA, Japan and South America. He gives educational lectures in all five languages that he speaks. Since 1980, Giobbi has been a member of the Escuela Magica de Madrid, an exclusive magic think tank that has only 40 members worldwide.

In recognition of his skill at sleight of hand card magic, Giobbi has won several international awards in magic, notably Vice World Champion in Card Magic at FISM in 1988 and 1991. He was awarded the first-ever Grand Prix from the Swiss Magic Convention, in 1990, as the winner of all categories. In 2012, the Academy of Magical Arts awarded him their "Literary & Media Fellowship."

He lives and works as a freelance magician, seminar leader and specialist writer in Muttenz, Switzerland. He also gives interdisciplinary talks and workshops for industry managers on creativity, communication, and presentation, and is sought out by professional magicians worldwide for his expertise and lectures.

Giobbi is married and has two children.

== Notable awards ==
- 1987 Writer of the Year of the Magischer Zirkel von Deutschland
- 1988 Runner-up in the category of Card Magic at FISM (The Hague)
- 1990 Grand Prix at the Swiss Championships of Magic
- 1991 Runner-up in the category of Card Magic at FISM (Lausanne)
- 2011 Literary & Media Fellowship from Academy of Magical Arts
- 2014 John Nevil Maskelyne Award for Literature from the Magic Circle of London
- 2015 FISM Lifetime Achievement Award “Theory & Philosophy”

== Notable books ==
- Card College, Vol. 1 (1995)
- Card College, Vol. 2 (1996)
- Card College, Vol. 3 (1998)
- Card College, Vol. 4 (2000)
- Card College, Vol. 5 (2003)
- Card College Light (2006)
- Card College Lighter (2008)
- Card College Lightest (2010)
- Secret Agenda (2010)
- Confidences (2013)
- The Art of Switching Decks (2013)
- Standup Card Magic (2015)
- Sharing Secrets (2021)

== Film ==
In 2004, part of Giobbi's life was captured by Swiss TV in a 50-minute documentary entitled "Il giardino dei giochi segreti."
