= Juan Tamariz =

Spanish magician (1942–2026)

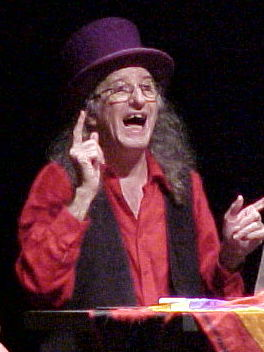
- Tamariz in 2001
- Born: Juan Tamariz-Martel Negrón; 18 October 1942; Madrid, Spain
- Died: 18 August 2026 (aged 83); Madrid, Spain
- Occupation: Magician
- Website: juantamariz.org

Juan Manuel Tamariz-Martel Negrón (18 October 1942 – 18 August 2026) was a Spanish magician.

Tamariz was considered to have pioneered close-up card magic. American stage magician Ricky Jay once said he considered him to be a magician people will remember, and he was referred to as "the greatest and most influential card magician alive" by David Blaine. Tamariz performed at FISM in 2006 in Stockholm, 2009 in Beijing, People's Republic of China, 2015 in Rimini, Italy, and 2018 in Busan, South Korea.

A celebrity of television and stage in Spain and South America, Tamariz has authored seven books translated into English: The Five Points in Magic, The Magic Way, Sonata, Mnemonica, Verbal Magic, The Magic Rainbow, and Flamenco.

Among magicians, Juan Tamariz was also famous for the school of thought in close-up magic, which he founded together with Arturo de Ascanio.

== Early years ==
Tamariz was born in Madrid on 18 October 1942. He pursued an interest in magic from childhood. As a teenager he was mentored by members of the Spanish Society of Illusionism. He studied physics at the Universidad Complutense de Madrid but did not complete a degree. Later he attended a film school that closed before he could graduate. He turned to magic full-time, performing at beach resorts.

== Television career ==
Tamariz received his big break in 1975 when he was hired to star in the show Magic Time on Televisión Española. He appeared regularly on Spanish television over the span of almost 2 decades.

In 1994, he appeared on the NBC special The World’s Greatest Magic.

Screening in theatres in 2024, the documentary Lost In The Shuffle visits magicians, including Tamariz, to explore their favourite card tricks.

== Death ==
Juan Tamariz died at San Carlos Hospital, Madrid, on 18 August 2026, aged 83.

== Books ==
- Monedas, monedas... (y monedas) (1969, CYMYS).
- Truki-cartomagia (1970, CYMYS). In collaboration with Ramón Varela
- Aprenda Usted Magia (1973, CYMYS).
- Magia en el Bar (1975, CYMYS).
- Magicolor: (la magia del cambio de color) (1977, CYMYS).
- Enciclopedia del forzaje (1980, Self Published — photocopy).
- Los Cinco Puntos Mágicos (1982, Editorial Frakson).
  - Revised (1988, Editorial Frakson).
  - Revised (2005, Editorial Frakson).
  - English Version: The Five Points in Magic (2007, Hermetic Press).
- Por arte de magia: Historia de los autómatas precedida de la historia de la prestidigitación y manipulación. (1982, Puntual).
- La Vía Mágica (1988, Editorial Frakson).
  - Second Edition, Spanish (2011, Editorial Frakson).
  - English Version: The Magic Way (2014, Hermetic Press).
- Sonata: Música Bruja Vol I (1989, Editorial Frakson).
  - English Version: Bewitched Music, Vol. 1: Sonata, translation: Donald Lehn, (1991, Editorial Frakson).
- Secretos de magia potagia. Volumen 2 de La biblioteca encantada de Juan Tamariz. (1990, Editorial Frakson).
- La sangre del turco. Volumen 3 de La biblioteca encantada de Juan Tamariz. (1990, Editorial Frakson).
- El Mundo mágico de Tamariz (1991, Ediciones del Prado).
- La magia del falso pulgar: (teoría, técnica y práctica) (1992, Producciones Mágicas Tamariz).
- Sinfonía en mnemónica mayor: la baraja mnemónica de Tamariz. Volumen 2 de Música bruja (2000, Producciones Mágicas Tamariz)
  - English Version: Mnemonica (2004, Hermetic Press).
- Por arte de verbimagia (2005, Producciones Mágicas Tamariz)
  - English Version: Verbal Magic (2008, Hermetic Press).
- El Arcoiris Mágico (2016, Gema Navarro).
  - English Version: The Magic Rainbow (2019).
- Flamenco (2024, Hermetic Press).

== Awards ==
=== Spain ===
- Second Prize for Comical Magic, in Congreso Mágico Nacional de Zaragoza, 1962.
- As de Cartomagia (Ace of card magic) in the first magical contest of Madrid, 1968.
- Great Prize in the IV Congreso Nacional de Magia de San Sebastián, April 1972.
- The Council of Ministers of Spain awarded him the Medalla de Oro al Mérito en las Bellas Artes (Gold Medal for Merit in Fine Arts), April 2011.
- The Madrid City Council awarded him the Gold Medal of the city, May 2019.

=== International ===
- 2° Prize on Micromagic, with Juan Antón (routine: Los Mancos), FISM Amsterdam XI, 1970.
- 1° Prize on Close-up Card, FISM Paris XII 1973.
- Mention as Magician of the Year, by the Academy of Magical Arts, 1992.
- Mention as Performing Fellowship, by the Academy of Magical Arts, 2000.
- Special Award on Theory & Philosophy, FISM Beijing XXIV 2009.
- Mention as Master Fellowship, by the Academy of Magical Arts, 2012.
- The John Nevil Maskelyne Prize (2013)

== See also ==
- List of magicians
