= Norbert Ferré =

French magician, stage director and artistic director

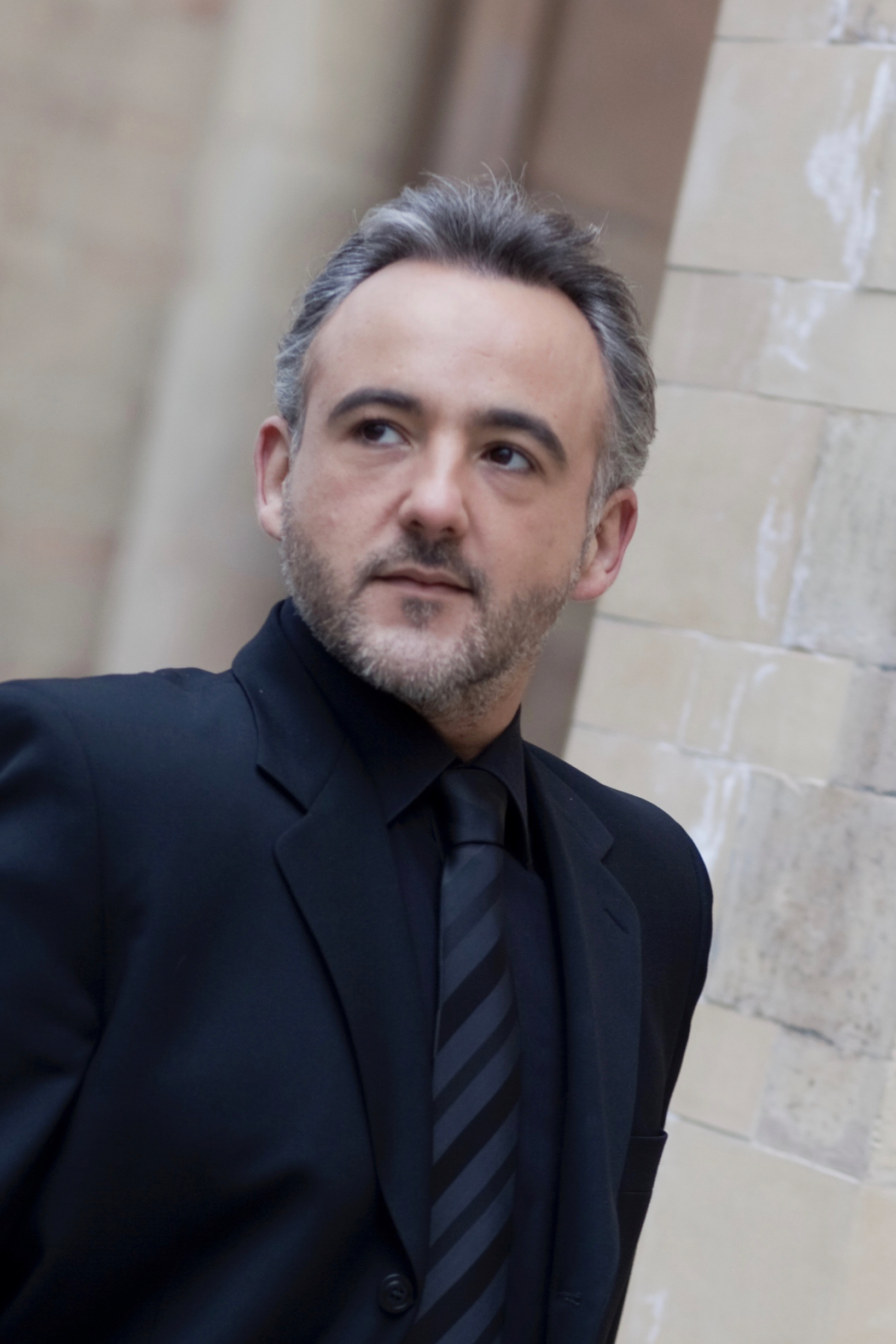
- Norbert Ferré (2017)
- Born: September 23, 1975 (age 51); Marseille, France
- Occupations: Magician; Stage director; Artistic director
- Notable work: One for Two, Two for One
- Style: Stage manipulation and comedy
- Awards: Member of the Inner Magic Circle with Gold Star (2001); Mandrake d'Or (2002); FISM First Prize in Manipulation and Grand Prix for Stage Magic (2003); Jean Eugène Robert-Houdin Gold Medal (2003); Medal of the City of Marseille (2005); Ocean of Laughter Award – International Best for Double (2026)
- Website: www.norbertferre.fr

Norbert Ferré (born 23 September 1975 in Marseille) is a French magician, stage director and artistic director. His signature act, One for Two, Two for One, combines stage manipulation with comedy and self-deprecation, as he alternates between two contrasting characters: a talkative, clumsy host and a serious, focused magician. In 2003, he won first prize in manipulation and the Grand Prix for stage magic at the FISM World Championship of Magic. Since 2012, he has served as president of MAGEV, a French nonprofit association that presents magic shows for children and adults facing illness, disability or other difficult circumstances. He also performs internationally, works as a master of ceremonies and directs magic productions.

== Early life ==
Ferré became interested in magic in 1986, at age 11, after attending a performance by magician Christian Preston in La Ciotat. He began learning magic and was admitted to the Magicians Club of Provence in Marseille at age 13. He initially performed under the stage name Maginor, which he abandoned in 1999 in favour of using his real name professionally.

In June 1998, at age 22, Ferré was elected president of the Magicians Club of Provence, becoming the youngest president of an FFAP-affiliated club in France. He held the position until March 2001. After completing university studies in sociology and psychology, he became a professional magician in 2000.

== Career ==
Ferré specialises in stage manipulation. In 1989, he began developing a manipulation act, which he first entered in competition in 1991 under the stage name Maginor. He won second prize at the inaugural Jean-Eugène Robert-Houdin magic competition in Blois, where he met Marseille magician Pierre Brahma. Brahma had won the FISM Grand Prix in 1964 and 1976.

In 2000, Ferré won second prize in manipulation at the 21st FISM World Championship of Magic in Lisbon. In September 2000, he was invited to the Tenyo International Magic Convention in Japan.

In 2001, Ferré received the Dennis Sowers Award for Creativity at the World Magic Seminar in Las Vegas. The same year, he was appointed a Member of the Inner Magic Circle with Gold Star, the highest membership distinction awarded by The Magic Circle. At the 22nd FISM World Championship of Magic in The Hague in 2003, he won first prize in manipulation and the Grand Prix for stage magic.

In 2007, Ferré was profiled as one of ten notable figures in French magic in the book La magie pour les nuls (Magic for Dummies).

Ferré later performed at the Crazy Horse in Paris. In 2011, he appeared at the inaugural White Magic international festival in Perm, Russia.

In March 2012, Ferré became president of MAGEV, a French nonprofit association founded in 2001 that provides magic shows to children facing illness or other difficult circumstances and to adults with intellectual disabilities. As of 19 August 2026, the association reported having presented 1,092 shows, visited 414 institutions and reached more than 58,000 spectators across France and Belgium.

Ferré has also worked as a presenter and master of ceremonies. He has hosted La Nuit de la Magie in Saint-Quentin-Fallavier since 2013.

Ferré has contributed articles to several specialist magic publications, including the Revue de la Prestidigitation, Idem and Magische Welt. Since 2021, he has co-written the recurring column “D’accord / Pas d’accord” with Patrick Dessi, a professor and ENT surgeon, for the Revue de la Prestidigitation.

In late 2024, Ferré joined the cast of Luís de Matos's Impossible sur scène, presented at the Folies Bergère in Paris for nearly a month through 1 December. He subsequently appeared in Impossible Live at Prague's O2 Universum from 23 to 25 May 2025, and in the 2025–2026 Portuguese season of Impossível Ao Vivo, which played in Figueira da Foz, Lisbon and Porto.

In August 2026, Ferré and Charlie Mag presented their production Double at the 14th Busan International Comedy Festival. The production received the Ocean of Laughter Award, the festival's prize for the best invited international performance.

=== Stage direction ===
At the 2018 FISM World Championship of Magic in Busan, Ferré staged Magic Circus, a gala combining magic and circus arts. In December 2019, he staged The Magician – Le Show, promoted under the subtitle The Magician & the World's Greatest Performers, at La Sucrerie in Wavre, Belgium. The production brought together 25 international artists, with Charlie Mag in the central role. Ferré is also the artistic director of S2A International.

=== Signature act ===
Since 1999, Ferré's signature act, One for Two, Two for One, has combined comedy, acting and stage manipulation. He alternates between two contrasting characters: a talkative and clumsy host who entertains the audience while awaiting the arrival of a magician, and the serious, concentrated magician himself, who performs ball and card manipulations. Ferré performs the act in nine languages: French, English, German, Italian, Spanish, Russian, Japanese, Korean and Portuguese.

== Filmography ==
- 2001: L'Origine du monde, directed by Jérôme Enrico

== Honours and awards ==
Year	Award	Granting body	Event	Ref(s)
2001	Membership of the Inner Magic Circle with a Gold Star	The Magic Circle		
2001	Dennis Sowers Award for Creativity	World Magic Seminar	World Magic Seminar, Las Vegas	
2002	Mandrake d’Or	French Academy of Illusionists	Mandrakes d’Or	
2003	First prize in manipulation	FISM	22nd FISM World Championship of Magic, The Hague	
2003	Grand Prix – Stage Magic (World Champion of Magic)	FISM	22nd FISM World Championship of Magic, The Hague	
2003	Jean Eugène Robert-Houdin Gold Medal	Fédération Française des Artistes Prestidigitateurs	Aix-les-Bains Congress	
2005	Médaille de la Ville de Marseille	City of Marseille		
2014	Commemorative plaque bearing his handprints and signature on the Paseo Mágico Florences Gili	Colectivo Pro-Tamarit	Encuentro Nacional de Magos “Florences Gili”, Tamarite de Litera	
2026	Ocean of Laughter Award (International Best), awarded to the production Double, performed with Charlie Mag	Busan International Comedy Festival	14th Busan International Comedy Festival	
