= Tommy Wonder (magician) =

Dutch magician

Tommy Wonder (November 29, 1953 – June 26, 2006) was the stage name of Jacobus Maria Bemelman, a Dutch magician who performed both close-up and stage magic. Wonder performed in Las Vegas, Monte Carlo and on Fox television.

Wonder developed an interest in conjuring at an early age. He studied acting, dancing and singing for three years at the Academie voor Podiumvorming (Performance Academy) in The Hague and subsequently toured for two years with De Haagsche Comedie.

He took second prize at the FISM World Championships of Magic in 1979 and again in 1988. In 1998 he also received the Performer Fellowship Award from the Academy of Magical Arts in Hollywood. In 1999, he was awarded Best Sleight of Hand Performer from the World Magic Awards. Because Wonder designed and developed all of his own repertoire, he was held in high esteem amongst his colleagues in magic. On 5 August 2006 he posthumously received the Theory & Philosophy Award at the FISM World Championships of Magic in Stockholm.

Wonder's 1996 two-volume The Books of Wonder is highly acclaimed.

He died in 2006, shortly after being diagnosed with lung cancer.

== Works ==
- Wonder, Tommy; Minch, Stephen (1996). The Books of Wonder. Seattle: Hermetic Press. ISBN 0-945296-16-9.
