= Arturo de Ascanio =

Spanish magician (1929–1997)

Arturo de Ascanio (22 March 1929 – 6 April 1997) is considered the father of Spanish card magic. He is referred to by Milbourne Christopher as "the Dai Vernon of Spain."

== Biography ==
Maestro Ascanio (as he was called by contemporary magician Juan Tamariz) was born Arturo de Ascanio y Navaz in the Canary Islands in 1929. He studied law and became a lawyer and an amateur magician. Notwithstanding the fame he achieved with his card tricks, he never became a professional magician and continued with his legal practice. He died in Madrid in 1997.

== Theories of magic ==
When preparing his card acts, Ascanio placed great importance on the idea of naturalness, nonchalance, and slowness of action. He believed that any hurried, or unnatural looking actions would destroy the magical atmosphere.

== Techniques ==
Ascanio is most famous for a technique called the "Ascanio Spread". This name was given by Fred Kaps; Ascanio himself gave the technique the more modest title of "The Wiggle". Along with this came several variations of the spread and several methods of laying cards onto a table from the spread in such a way as to hide their true quantity.

== Tricks ==
Ascanio improved several card tricks, but his signature pieces include "Aces with Love" and "Sleightless Oil and Water". His original tricks include "The Restless Lady" and "The Aces of My Exam". Ascanio went through many variations of these tricks.

== Bibliography ==
- Ascanio: A Biographical Interview, by Docampo, published in Ilusionismo #178, 1959
- The Magic of Ascanio: The Structural Conception of Magic, by Ascanio and Etcheverry
- The Magic of Ascanio: Studies of Card Magic, by Etcheverry

== Links ==
https://antoniovalero.com/index.php/cartomagia/grandes-cartomagos/138-arturo-de-ascanio
