= Magic Club of Vienna =

The Magic Club of Vienna, or the Magischer Klub Wien as it is referred to in local circles, is the oldest association of magicians in Austria. It was founded in 1908 and has become a welcome meeting point for amateur and professional magicians. During World War II the Magic Club of Vienna became a regional branch of the German Magic Circle.

In 1958 and 1976 the "International Federation of Magic Societies" (FISM) entrusted the club to organize the World Congress of Magic in Vienna. The Magic Club of Vienna is a founding member of FISM, and also initiated the Magischer Ring Austria (Magic Ring of Austria), but to which it no longer belongs.

In 1989 Magic Christian became president of the club. In the same year he founded the first Young Magician's Club in Austria.

Today the Magic Club of Vienna has more than 34 adult and around 20 junior members; the latter group are taught the art of magic in their Young Magicians Club.
