= Red de Magos Solidarios =

Argentinian nonprofit organization

Red de Magos Solidarios (Red Maso, Solidarity magicians Network) is and nonprofit organization based in Buenos Aires, Argentina where magicians of all country make solidarity with their favorite art, magic. The organization hosts a self-named "Twittermagia" conference every year, where magicians compete for "Best of" categories.

Red Maso is part of the American Federation of Magic Societies (FLASOMA) and Fédération Internationale des Sociétés Magiques (FISM ).

== Objectives ==
The main objective of Red Maso is to provide magical shows solidarity to people who otherwise would not have access to the cultural moment in question. It was declared of cultural interest by the Legislature of the City of Buenos Aires and received numerous awards from provincial and municipal governments in Argentina.

== Activities ==
Red de Magos Solidarios' performs the following activities:

- Shows at different places of public interest such as prisons, schools, hospitals and other places.

== Red Maso at championships ==
Different representatives Solidarity Network Wizards traveled to international competitions to compete in tournaments of magic. In World XXIV organized by the FISM magic in 2009 in Beijing, Tony Montana won third prize in the category of Mentalism.

== Links ==
- Federación Latinoamericana de Sociedades Mágicas
- Sitio oficial
- Red Maso en FISM
