= Fred Kaps =

Dutch magician (1926–1980)

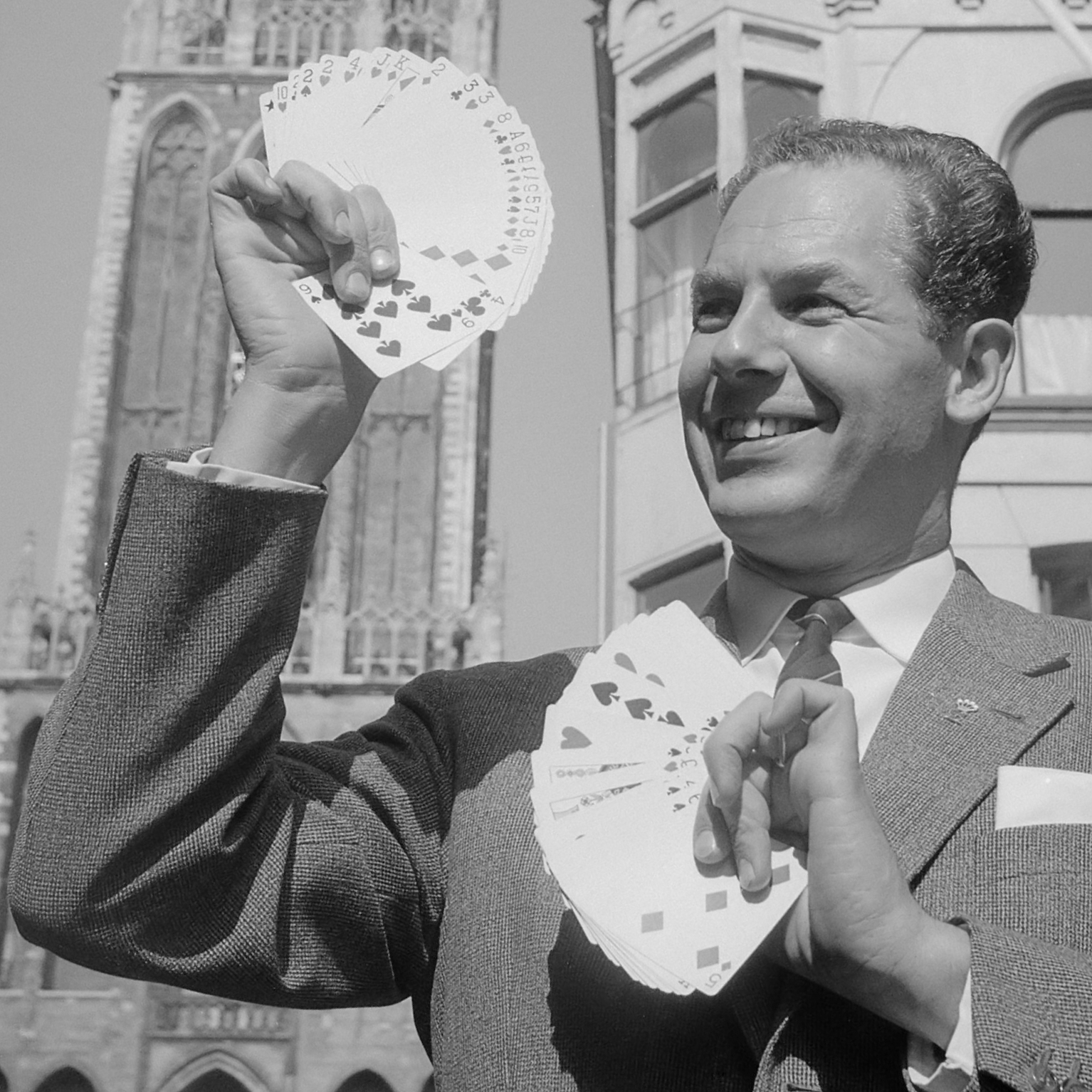
- Fred Kaps (1961)
- Born: Abraham Pieter Adrianus Bongers; 8 June 1926; Rotterdam
- Died: 23 July 1980 (aged 54); Utrecht
- Occupation: magician

Fred Kaps (official name Abraham Pieter Adrianus Bongers; 8 June 1926 – 23 July 1980) was a Dutch magician, famous for being the only magician to become FISM Grand Prix world champion three times. He was the creator of numerous original effects including his version of the color-changing silks. Another popular effect he often performed was the long-pour salt trick. Part of the act has Kaps exhibiting facial expressions of great surprise and disbelief, as he tries unsuccessfully to desperately stop the flow.

Another of Kaps' most renowned tricks throughout the world was the Dancing & Floating Cork, which he performed at extremely close quarters, allowing his audience to be really close-up to view the illusion. A small cufflink box was shown, then opened to find a wine bottle cork resting inside. With hands being held extremely steady, the cork starts to move and wriggle around inside the box. It is stated that this is a floating cork; well, all corks float on water. This one floats on air. With that, the cork floats outside the box with absolutely no visible means of support. A small four-inch diameter metal ring is then passed over the cork every which-way. The cork stays floating. The audience is so close they cannot see anything holding the cork afloat. At the conclusion Kaps would grab the cork and pass it to an audience member watching.

Fred Kaps collaborated with magician Ken Brooke at Ken Brooke's Magic Place to market the trick to magicians starting in the early 1970s. To purchase the Kaps Dancing & Floating Cork, buyers were required to sign a contract with Ken Brooke agreeing not to reveal or share the secret. Following this agreement, the trick could be purchased. Fred Kaps later performed the cork trick on the British television show Parkinson, hosted by Michael Parkinson.

== Biography ==
=== Haircut that became magic ===
Bram was born in Rotterdam and became interested in magic through performances by his barber, Piet Verschragen. Verschragen was not only good at cutting hair, but was also an amateur magician. He often tried magic effects on his customers. One of his favorites was the disappearance of two matchsticks. One of the customers that was more interested than most was young Bram. He had visited Verschragen's shop often. The barber said he would, if he'd got a hair cut first. Bram would go home and practice until he knew how to perform these effects himself. Then he would return for more. While there, Bram noticed Verschragen's daughter, Nel or Nelly. Piet too noticed this. After a while the barber asked him, "Bram, what are you really coming in for, my daughter or my magic tricks?" An embarrassed Bram answered, "Both." Bram practiced each new trick that the barber taught him as well as befriending his daughter Nel.

In secondary school Bram showed his classmates what he knew. This was usually at the wrong time. His teacher would confiscate the tricks and put them in his drawer. Bram's father was not pleased. He tried to tell his son repeatedly that, "Not a sliver of bread could be earned with this kind of jocularity."

At the age of nine, Bram collected coupons on oatmeal packages and sent away for a box of magic tricks. After finishing his high school education, Bram thought about becoming a cook like his brother. He was tested by the MULO (translated is expanded primary education). The MULO's results showed that Bram had a natural talent for design. His father wanted him to enroll into a drawing academy in Amsterdam so he could work as an artist in advertising. But Bram wanted to turn his hobby into a profession. His father would have had his way if WWII didn't intervene. There was no trains going to Amsterdam at the time and Bram had to stay in Rotterdam. That's when his interest in magic grew.

Using the name Valdini, he performed at weddings and parties. Then he changed his name to Mystica and performed for Dutch soldiers. Later, Bram too had to serve in the military. He was put into the "cabaret group" and performed magic. He went to Indonesia where he retained his passion for magic by performing. He greatly admired American magician Channing Pollock as well as Italian magician Chefalo and German magician Kalanag (born Helmut Ewald Schreiber), who toured the world as an illusionist. Bram worked with him for about one month. Kalanag wanted him to take over the show. It just didn't work out for him. It seemed that the big trunks, the crates, and large illusions just didn't suit him. Bram favored the smaller props.

World War II ended and normal life resumed. But, young Mystica found it difficult to get work. In 1946, Bram entered the competition at the first national Dutch convention for the International Congress of Magicians. About three hundred artists from the Netherlands, France, Great Britain, Belgium and Spain attended the convention. The event was put together by the magical magazine Triks.

On August 9 magic competitions where held at the Krasnapolski Hotel in Amsterdam, the Netherlands. The festivities would include a ball and a public show. The convention was attended by such masters in the field of magic as Jean Valton from France, John Ramsay from Scotland and Balsamo, Boeda and the Flezki's from the Netherlands.

Bram, under the stage name of Mystica, performed a gambling routine. Mystica didn't win a prize that day, but he made a good impression on columnist Alex Wins. He wrote, "In the opinion of your reporter, this young man presented the best performance of the convention. His Poker Deal was neatly done, technically outstanding and met high artistic standards. He also proved that mime and acting are of great value. Mystica is still young, but I'll dare to predict that he has a dazzling future ahead."

Bram was a protégé of Henk Vermeijden, who was the owner of a magic studio in Amsterdam. Henk trained several world champions. He became Mystica's agent, director, and coach. In 1950, Bram had a new act, the continuous production of canes, which he had rehearsed with Henk for about a year. He performed it at the Dutch national convention in Arnhem, and was a big hit. What impressed everyone was not only the personality that would soon gain him worldwide acclaim, but that cultivated look of the routine that was so technically polished.

=== First FISM win ===
Later that year, he revised the Cane act and went to Barcelona, Spain where he performed it at the FISM World Convention. With his perpetual appearance of canes, he charmed the 2,000 that attended. The applause that followed was thunderous. Within ten minutes he magically transformed himself from an unknown young man from Utrecht, to the success of the entire convention. He gained his first Grand Prix.

During the closing ceremonies, Bram was presented with an extra prize by the Swedish Magic Circle. They gave him a silver wand for being the most polished act of the convention. Then after FISM, Mystica was signed up for a two-week run in Barcelona at the El Cortijo nightclub. From then on he became a heavily booked magician.

There were other magicians that used similar sounding names to Mystica. Henk didn't like the sound of Mystica. He felt Bram needed a name that would, “…click in any language”, so they sat down to ponder an appropriate name. They went through the phone book until they found an advertisement for raincoats made by a company named Daks. From there they developed the word Kaps. But Bram Kaps would not do because people from other countries always mangled his first name. So in December 1950, Bongers, changed his stagename to Fred Kaps. In 1952, Kaps married his childhood sweetheart Nelly.

=== Kaps second and third Grand Prix wins ===
The next convention, Kaps sat out. He meant to defend his title but was developing a new act. He did attend the following convention in Amsterdam in 1955. A day before the competition some of Kaps' friends, who had seen a few of the competitors' acts, told him to withdraw because the others looked very promising. They suggested Kaps should feign some kind of injury or illness. “You must find any excuse to withdraw,” his friends said. Kaps was upset by all of this. Nelly heard this and got angry. “Are you crazy”, she said. She turned to Kaps and said, “If you do that I’ll expose you! We are here to enjoy ourselves.” The next morning she purchased some tranquilizers and got him to take a hot bath to relax him.

But his friends didn't realize Kaps’ new act had a lot of surprises in store. On the day of his performance, he wasn't going to let the public sense his anxiety. He entered the stage carrying a walking cane. They expected him to go into his continuous production of canes routine. Then, to the audience surprise, he produced a full size rabbit from the tip of the cane. From there, he did a series of silk manipulations. He did some unique one handed color changes, followed by the canary in microphone. He intermixed some card manipulations in between. One stunt was to spread the cards over his arm. Then he flipped the cards over with the same hand and caught the cards before they fell to the floor. He seemed to take great joy as the cards flowed through.

The finale was a version Roy Benson's Long Pour Salt. Both Benson and Kaps handling of the trick were superb. Benson used dialogue interspersed with a syncopated drum beat. Benson pretends to be bored as the salt just keeps pouring and pouring. He looks at his watch while the music acts like it's stuck as it plays one note waiting and waiting for the salt to finish. Finally it does. Benson shows his hands empty and runs off stage.

Kaps handling is different. He is silent throughout the trick using music in the background. He takes out the salt cellar and tries to shake the salt into his closed fist. Too impatient for that, he opens the cap and makes it disappear. Then he taste it as he mouths the word, “Salt”. He pours it into his fist and makes the salt disappear. He shows his hands empty and produces the salt from his closed fist.

He picks up the shaker and tries to catch the produced salt, but it starts to overflow. He panics as he doesn't know what to do with the over abundance of the white stuff. The music starts to end and Kaps poses as he hopes the salt will end with it. Silence. The music has stopped, but the salt has not. He looks over to the bandleader to play something. The band plays Stars and Stripes For Ever by John Philip Sousa and the salt keeps pouring. Frantically, Kaps puts some of the salt into his pants pocket to get rid of it. The march ends, but the salt keeps pouring. Kaps taps his foot for the bandleader to keep playing. It does and so does the salt. The music ends again and again the salt going. Kaps is laughing in embarrassment. He looks at the bandleader and utters “Da, da, da, da, da, da, da, da”, and the band plays the Sousa march again. Finally the salt runs out and Kaps brushes the remaining salt from his empty hands. He takes a bow to the thunderous roars of applause. Years later Kaps widow Nelly told Kaps biographer Freddie Jelsma that he worked on that closing bit for three years, "Salt was strewn constantly throughout the living room. If I needed some for cooking and couldn't find it in the kitchen, I knew Fred had been busy again”.

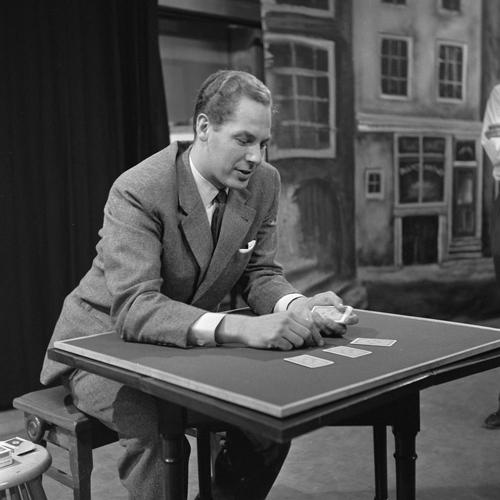
Fred Kaps (1959)

Once again Kaps waited six years before he defended his title. It was almost expected of him. Days before the convention, ever the perfectionist, he was a nervous wreck. The night before the World Congress, the Dutch newspaper Het Parool printed, “Yesterday, the world champion Fred Kaps from Rotterdam gave an example of the act he will use to defend his title.” The paper went on to say that when Kaps gave a sample performance for his colleagues, it “…nearly brought the house down.”

Kaps improved the salt pour trick and added other items to his act. And once again added a few more surprises. FISM was to take place in Liège, Belgium on 6 September 1961. About 560 magicians from twenty-three countries registered, from which some 120 competed. The actual competition went on and on from day after day. There was also a lot of dead spots in between. While there were many repetitive performances, some were bright spots. Former third-place winner in Vienna, Frenchman Pierre Brahma and Kaps, past champion. Brahma looked good and his act was spectacular. It was felt that he was the only competitor that would stand in the way of Kaps winning three grand championships. Brahma displayed silks empty and produced precious jewelry by the handful. As a finale, Brahma produced a chest that was overflowing with jewels.

This artistic performance made the tension even greater for Kaps. He started off with his usual opening of vanishing a cane in a newspaper. Then he started to read the paper, but cannot make out the print, so while folding the paper he produces a lit candle. He did a double take when he realized the impossibility of what he just did. All of this was taken from his previous act. Next he led to the new items.

He had preset a champagne bottle in a bucket next to him. From the bottle, bubbles came popping out. Kaps reached out and grabbed one of them. He proceeded to do manipulations with the bubble. After he was done with the bubbles, Fred moved on to the rest of his act. Instead of playing cards, Kaps manipulates banknotes, producing an endless amount of bills. Throughout all of this, he was interrupted by applause. He took these bills and boomeranged them into his top hat. The lit candles still continued to plague him appearing and disappearing. For the finale, Kaps produced a large candelabra.

When he was finished, the curtain fell and there a silence for a while. Then the audience awoke from their stupor and broke into an ovation. Twelve jurors from 12 different countries granted Kaps with the Grand Prix de'Honour. He became the first person to win three consecutive world championships.

== Life after FISM ==
Kaps used those wins to appear on The Ed Sullivan Show in the United States on 9 February 1964. Unfortunately for Kaps, his act directly followed the highly anticipated American debut of British Rock and Roll sensation The Beatles. Kaps did his version of Fred Braue's Homing Card, which he introduced as a new trick.

Along with his appearance (immaculate suit and white shirt), sleight of hand was Kaps' trademark. He would practice an effect for weeks before he dared to perform it live. He performed both stage illusions and close-up magic using a variety of props like playing cards, candles, coins, balls, dice and silks. Kaps didn't take to fame very well. He'd rather relax on his boat or camper than be stared at, “…like a monkey.” He preferred to stay at home and work on new effects or read his magic books. He enjoyed companionship and would talk all hours about his favorite subject, magic.

== Kaps' love of magic ==
Kaps was a perfectionist in his craft. He thought that reaching the top of magic did not depend on luck or chance. He felt that careful studying was (one of), “…the factors that brought the different magicians their individual successes.” According to Kaps' widow, Nelly Bongers, calling Bram (Fred Kaps) a perfectionist was, “…putting it mildly. You can't believe how thoroughly he would investigate a subject when he started something new.” She went on to talk about how this perfectionism was strong in everything he did in or outside magic. Kaps felt that magic was an art that should be studied. Loving originality, he admired anyone that did anything out of the ordinary even if it wasn't performed very well. He was interested in any amateur whose goal was originality.

== Death ==
Only Kaps' closest friends knew he had cancer. Fellow Dutchman and cabaret artist Wim Kan sent Kaps an audio cassette saying how he was shocked about finding out about the cancer. He consoled his ailing friend by telling him how much he and his wife Corrie cared for him. He ended by saying that he learned a lot from working with him. “I learned from you how, by making every effort, by working hard, by giving enormous concentration, and by coping with any difficulty that arises, one can reach the summit! It is said all the time, but I believe that's the way it is.”

He was doing much better and planned on working again. In March 1980, Kaps was honored with a Master Fellowship of the Academy of Magical Arts in Hollywood. Then he had a relapse. This time it was made public. On 23 July 1980, Kaps died. He was 54 years old. He was survived by his wife, mother and two daughters.

== Legacy ==
During a closed party on March 9, 2005, a memorial was revealed in front of the house in Utrecht where he used to live, to honor Kaps' contributions to magic.

He was called "World's Greatest Magician" in 1972 by George Anderson. In 1980 he received the AMA Masters Fellowship as well as being inducted in the SAM Hall of Fame.
