= Fédération Française des Artistes Prestidigitateurs =

French magic organization

French Federation of Conjurers
- Fédération Française des Artistes Prestidigitateurs
- Established: 1903 (123 years ago)
- Website: www.magie-ffap.com

The French Federation of Conjurers (FFAP) (Fédération Française des Artistes Prestidigitateurs) is a regional member organisation of FISM. As of 2013, Serge Odin is the president of the organisation.

== See also ==
- Fédération Internationale des Sociétés Magiques (FISM)
