= Swedish Magic Circle Society =

National organization for magic in Sweden

The Swedish Magic Circle Society (Swedish: Svensk Magisk Cirkel, SMC) is the national organization for magic in Sweden. SMC was founded in 1946, has its seat in Stockholm, and counts around 350 members. The magazine of SMC is called Trollkarlen ("The Magician"). In 2011 was the 65-year anniversary.

== See also ==
- Tom Stone (magician)
