= Johnny Ace Palmer =

American close-up magician

- Born: August 2, 1960 (age 65); Warren, Ohio
- Education: Lakeview (OH); Kent State University
- Occupation: close-up magician
- Awards: Grand Prix (1988 FISM) Close-up Magician of the Year (1986, 1987) Lecturer of the Year (1995, 1999) Parlour Magician of the Year (2013, 2017 The Magic Castle & the Academy of Magical Arts, Hollywood, California) Ben Chavez Memorial Award (1988) IBM Gold Cup Award of Excellence (1983) SAM Gold Medal Award of Honor (1986)
- Website: https://www.johnnyacepalmer.com/

Johnny Ace Palmer (born August 2, 1960) is an American close-up magician. Palmer has won numerous awards related to magic within his career, including become the first close-up magician in history to receive the Grand Prix award from the International Federation of Magic Societies.

== Personal life ==
Johnny Ace Palmer was born in Warren, Ohio. Palmer attended Lakeview High School. Palmer graduated from Kent State University, majoring in theater arts and psychology. Johnny married his first wife Susan in 1991; she was killed in a car accident in 2020. Johnny is now married to his wife Joyce, who he married in 2023.

== Magic career ==
Palmer became interested in magic when his grandfather hid a coin from him, before he turned a year old. He Learned his first card trick when he was four. He got his first gig at age twelve, when he performed at a church.

Palmer won the title of World Champion Magician in 1988. In so doing, he became the first close-up magician in history to receive the Grand Prix award from the International Federation of Magic Societies, and only the second American to win the award next to Lance Burton who was the first in 1982.

Palmer stopped performing large-scale illusions when his assistant, Peggy, his sister, got married. After that, he moved to Huntington Beach and focused on close-up sleight-of-hand magic tricks with cards, coins, and other ordinary objects. Palmer rarely performed for the public because he prefers special events.

Johnny appeared on the cover of The Linking Ring Magazine in 1998. Palmer was featured in an episode of the TV series Masters of Illusion aired March 2009.

== See also ==
- List of magicians
