= Shawn Farquhar =

Canadian magician (born 1962)

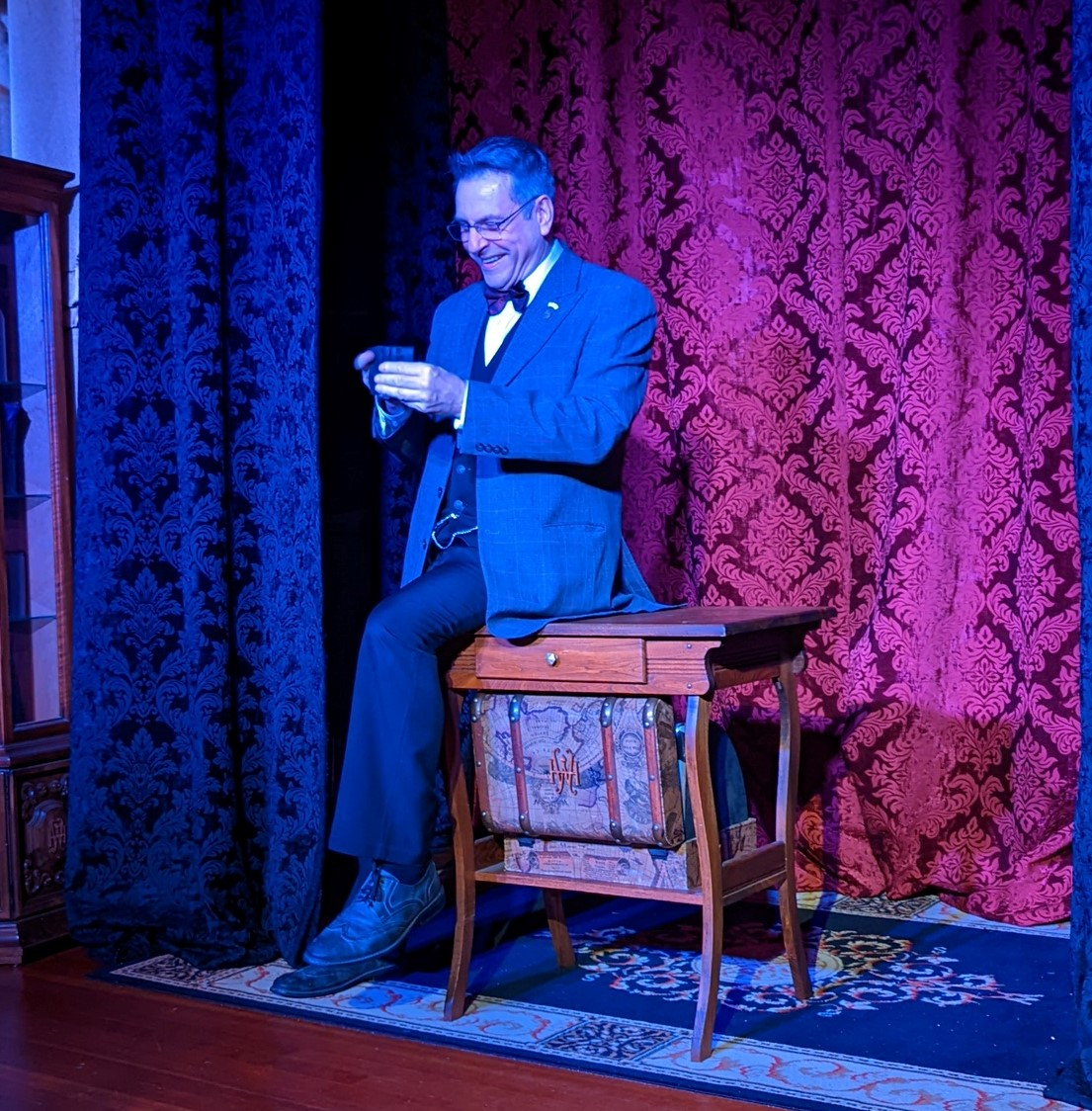
- Born: June 7, 1962 (age 64); Portage la Prairie, Manitoba
- Occupation: Magician

Shawn Farquhar (born June 7, 1962) is a Canadian magician and illusionist notable for his title as the "Grand Prix World Champion of Magic" from the International Federation of Magic Societies.

His awards include being the only magician in history to win First Place at the International Brotherhood of Magicians (IBM) for both Stage and Sleight of Hand, twice Canadian Association of Magicians Magician of the Year, First Place at the Society of American Magicians annual magic convention competition, three Silver (2nd Place) awards, and a First (World Championship) in Card Magic and the Grand Prix World Championship for Close Up at FISM, the "Olympics of Magic". In August 2009, he won his most prestigious prize at the FISM World Championship of Magic in Beijing. On May 1, 2010, the Canadian Association of Magicians once again named him Canadian Magician of the Year, making him the only two-time recipient of their most prestigious award. He is the second magician in the world to have won the "Triple Crown" of magic. This prestigious designation refers to taking first place at three of the industry's most esteemed competitions: the International Brotherhood of Magicians (IBM), the Society of American Magicians (SAM), and the Federation Internationale des Societes Magiques (FISM)

Living in British Columbia, Farquhar travels the world extensively performing and lecturing for magicians and consults for TV shows and motion pictures. He has appeared on the cover of the largest magic publications in Asia, Europe and North America. He has appeared on stages all over the world, including the Riveria, Las Vegas, Opera House, Blackpool and Orpheum, Vancouver. He performed for Elizabeth II on her visit to Charlottetown, PEI and traveled to Bermuda at the request of The Princess Royal.

He is a Past President of the International Brotherhood of Magicians, the Canadian Association of Magicians and Pacific Coast Association of Magicians.

== Original pieces ==
Farquhar is known for several original magic effects which include a signed card appearing in a sealed deck, a musical card routine titled "Shape of My Heart", MatriXpress, Torn 2 Pieces, Extended Stay, a specialized wallet trick named "C2W", a cups and balls routine that ends with solid cups and a recent effect to fool Penn & Teller entitled "Sheer Luck: the Comedy Book Test" (2018).

== Television appearances ==
Before going onto greater fame, Farquhar's appeared as a contestant on the Canadian-produced game show Talk About in 1989.

Farquhar appeared on The Ellen DeGeneres Show on January 13, 2010, where she referred to him as "the best sleight-of-hand magician in the world". He presented several effects, including his creation of a signed card in a sealed deck in Ellen DeGeneres' hands, and a torn and restored signed photograph.

In 2011, Farquhar was filmed for Season 1 on the UK show Penn & Teller: Fool Us, where hosts Penn and Teller view contesting magicians' tricks with the intention of working out their methods. Farquhar successfully fooled them by creating the illusion of a signed card appearing reversed inside a brand new (and shrink-wrapped) deck. Farquhar won the opportunity to perform at their Vegas show.

In 2012, Farquhar was a guest on the Canadian television talk show, Steven and Chris, where he presented several effects including a card trick with a golf ball retriever and a sand pail as well as his original prototype for a comedic book test. This would then be demonstrated on July 13, 2016, when he returned to Penn & Teller: Fool Us and asked the new host Alyson Hannigan to test him in recalling several random pages of the novel The Adventures of Sherlock Holmes in a segment called Sheer Luck. Farquhar was successful in fooling them, winning the opportunity to be at their Vegas show again. This made Shawn Farquhar the first magician to fool them twice.

Screening in theatres in 2024, the documentary Lost In The Shuffle sees Farquhar explore centuries old mysteries hidden in a deck of cards, while visiting fellow magicians to explore their favourite card tricks.
