= Greg Frewin =

- Born: May 21, 1967 (age 58); Hamilton, Ontario, Canada
- Occupation: Illusionist

Greg Frewin is a Canadian illusionist and "World Champion of Magic" by the International Federation of Magic Societies. His awards include first place at the International Brotherhood of Magicians (IBM); the Gold Medal of Excellence, also from the IBM; first place at the Society of American Magicians' annual magic convention competition; and first place at FISM, the "Olympics of Magic", which were held in Yokohama, Japan in 1994.

Frewin has been a command performance for Prince Rainier in Monte Carlo along with over 35 TV appearances worldwide.

Frewin has appeared on stages all over the world, including Caesars Palace, Tropicana and the Flamingo Hilton in Las Vegas. He is currently signed to a 20-year performance contract at the Greg Frewin Theatre in Niagara Falls, Ontario, Canada.

In 2009, Frewin won the World Magic Awards Magician of the Year.

Frogwater Media Inc, in association with CBC, produced a Holiday Special called "Greg Frewin Magic Man - Home for the Holidays" in 2009.

== Awards ==
- Niagara Falls Misty Award " Attraction of the Year - 2005
- Canadian Association of Magicians - Magician of the Year (first ever)
- 1st place Stage International Brotherhood of Magicians
- The Gold Medal of Excellence awarded by the International Brotherhood of Magicians
- 1st place Stage Society of American Magicians
- 1st place at FISM
- 2009 Magician of the Year - World Magic Awards
