= Lennart Green =

Swedish magician

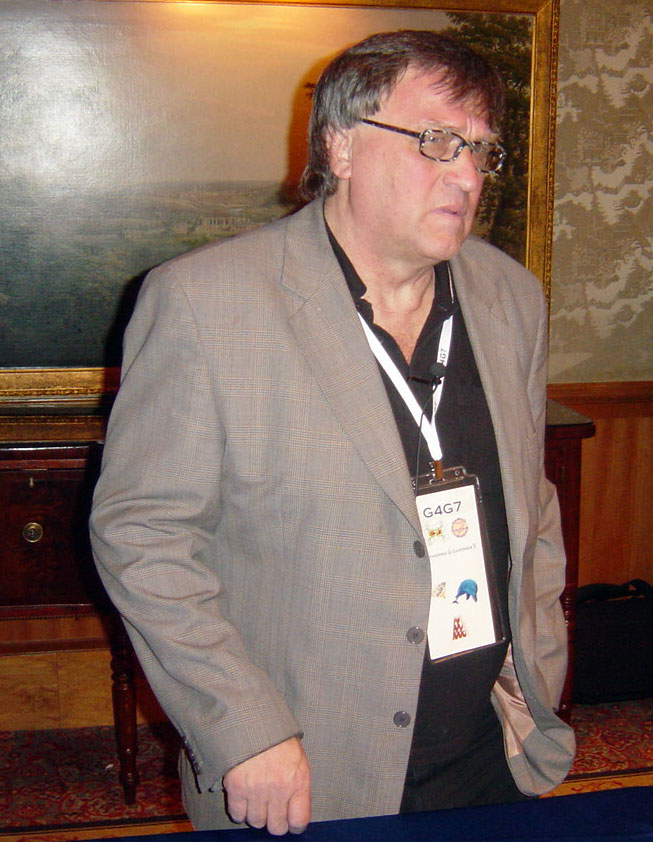
- Green in March, 2006
- Born: 25 December 1941 (age 84); Västervik, Sweden
- Occupation: Magician
- Known for: Magic tricks. Mainly card magic.
- Notable work: Masterfile, Greenlite

Sven Lennart Green (born 25 December 1941) is a Swedish world champion close-up/card magician, a title which he won in 1991 at the FISM convention in Lausanne, Switzerland. He is known for his seemingly chaotic routines which, in spite of first appearances, display great skill. His original techniques and presentation style form an unorthodox and innovative contribution to sleight of hand magic.

== Biography ==
Green started practicing magic at the age of 18. He competed at the 1988 FISM convention in The Hague, Netherlands, and was erroneously disqualified because the judges believed he had used Stooges in his act to shuffle the cards. In 1991, he performed the same act but insisted that the judges themselves shuffle the cards to prove that he wasn't using Stooges. The judges then awarded him first place.

Green has appeared on the fourth World's Greatest Magic television special. He lives in Gothenburg, Sweden, and lectures internationally.

He appeared at TED in February 2005, where he performed his signature card routine.

Privately, Green has worked 7 years as a doctor in Sweden. In 2014 Green suffered a stroke that prevented him from performing lectures in the following months, but has since fully recovered.

In late 2022, Swedish cardist Noel Heath released a deck of cards in collaboration with Lennart Green, Heath Backs Lennart Green ed. through his company Heath Cards.

== Works ==
- Green Magic – Classic Green, Volumes 1–6, DVD
- Green Magic – Green Lite, Volume 7, DVD
- Masterfile, Volumes 1–4, DVD
- The Stolen Cards, DVD
- The Figurine, DVD
- 1-2 Separation, booklet

== Sources ==
- Tibbs, Geoff, "Lennart Green and the Modern Drama of Sleight of Hand", Journal of Performance Magic, 1(1), October 2013.
