= MagicValongo =

Magic festival in Portugal

MagicValongo or Magic Valongo is an international magic festival and contest that has been held annually in Valongo, Portugal since 1992.

It is the oldest magical event in Portugal, and is held in September in the municipality of Valongo, particularly the city of Ermesinde. It attracts about two hundred participants and includes contests, galas with special guests, conferences, magic shows and street shows. In an official newsletter the Fédération Internationale des Sociétés Magiques (FISM) said that MagicValongo was a "wonderful small scale convention".

The festival is organised by an institution carrying the same name – MagicValongo – that is a full FISM member, and it is organized by an experienced expert commission headed by António Cardinal with Fernando Castro, Salazar Ribeiro and Manuel Alves, and the support of the Municipality of Valongo.

== External sources ==
- – official site
- http://www.docstoc.com/docs/6169215/FISM-NEWSLETTER-Nr-November-To-all-Presidents-of-the
- https://web.archive.org/web/20110519234324/http://www.cm-valongo.pt/maicvalongo-2010/
- https://web.archive.org/web/20110122004117/http://www.cm-valongo.pt/magicvalongo-2010-esta-prestes-a-comecar/
- http://iporto.amp.pt/eventos/magic-valongo-2009?theme=/tematicas/festivais
- https://magomarco-porartedemagia.blogspot.com/2007/10/magc-valongo.html
