= Fédération Internationale des Sociétés Magiques =

Organization

Fédération Internationale des Sociétés Magiques (FISM)
- Formation: 1948
- Headquarters: Lausanne, Switzerland
- International President: Andrea Baioni
- Website: www.fism.org

The International Federation of Magic Societies (FISM; French: Fédération Internationale des Sociétés Magiques) is an international federation of magic organizations. Founded in 1948, it brings together clubs and societies devoted to the art of magic. According to FISM, it comprises 114 societies representing more than 80,000 magicians from 51 countries. It organizes the World Championship of Magic, generally held every three years, and supervises the Continental Championships of Magic.

== History ==
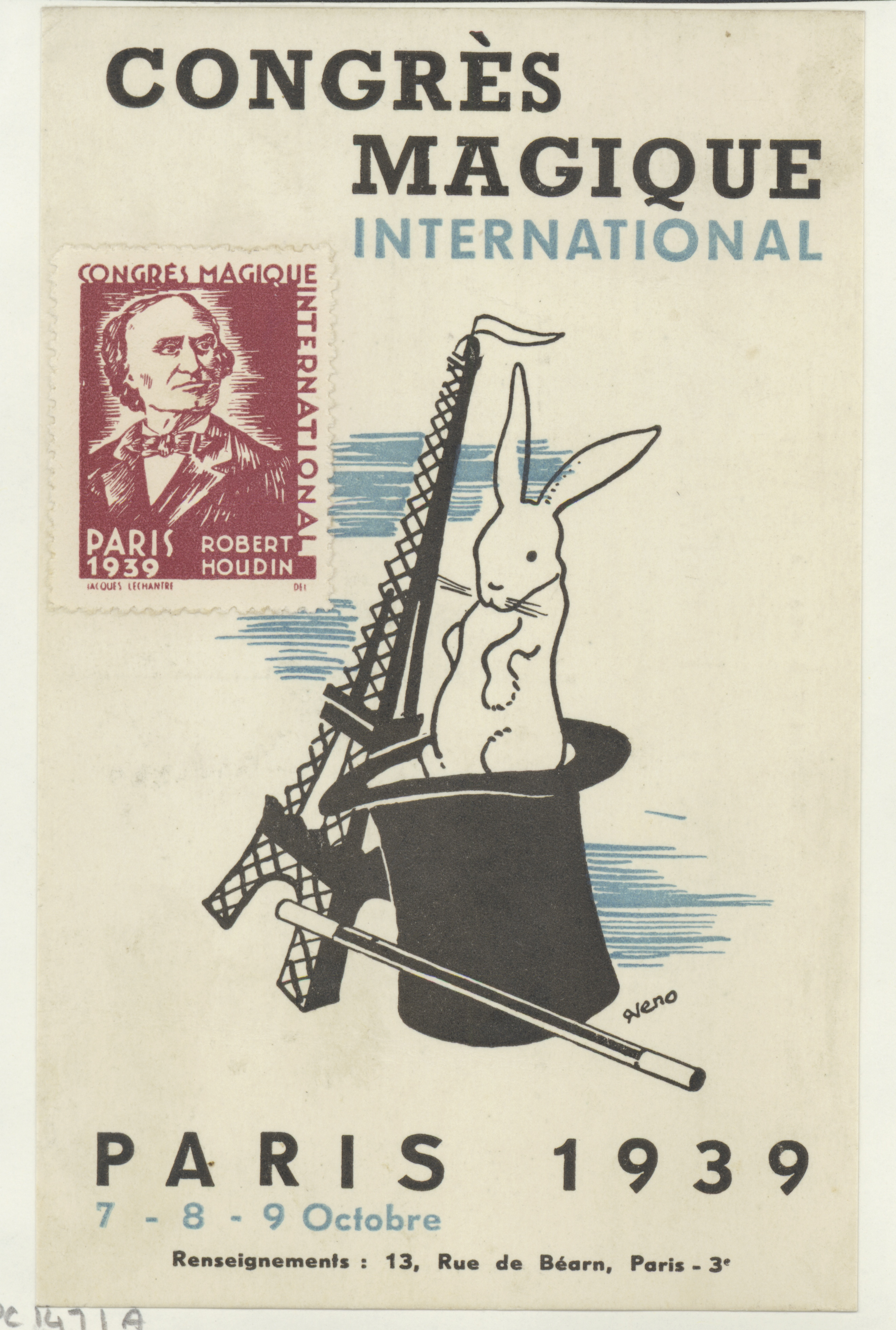
Postcard advertising the Congrès Magique International planned for Paris in 1939, which was cancelled following the outbreak of World War II.

The idea of organizing international magic congresses was proposed by Jules Dhotel in 1937. A congress planned for Paris in 1939 was cancelled following the outbreak of World War II. After international gatherings in Amsterdam in 1946 and Paris in 1947, representatives of magic societies met in Lausanne, Switzerland, in 1948 to establish FISM.

The first FISM World Congress was held in Lausanne in 1948. The early congresses were held annually; following the 1952 congress in Geneva, they were generally held every three years.

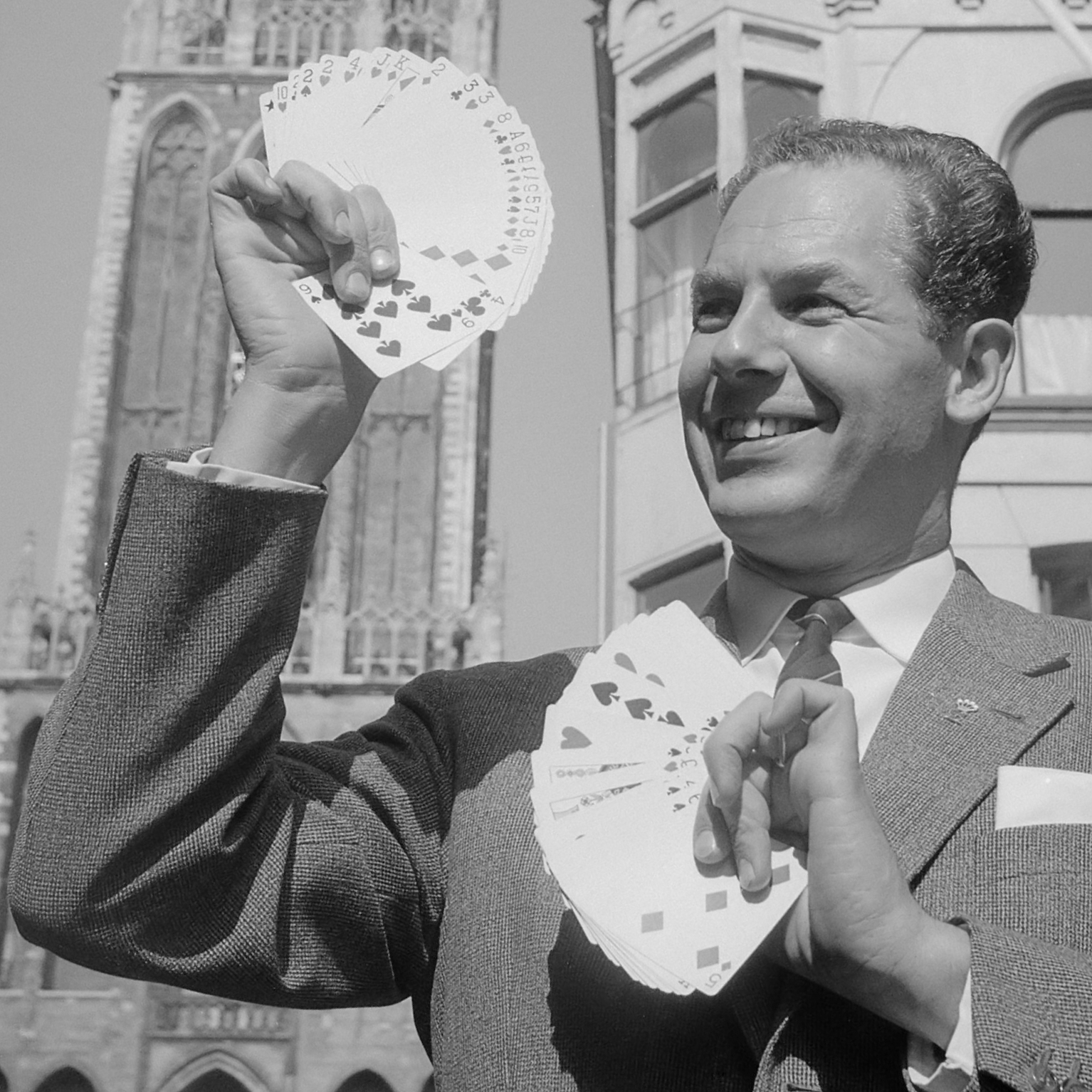
Fred Kaps in 1961, the year he won his third FISM Grand Prix.

Dutch magician Fred Kaps is the only magician to have won the FISM Grand Prix three times, winning in 1950, 1955 and 1961.

== Aims and organization ==
FISM's stated aims include promoting and developing magic as an art form, fostering cooperation among its member societies, preserving knowledge of the history of magic, and opposing the unauthorized exposure and copying of magic acts, effects, inventions and original routines.

The General Assembly is FISM's highest governing authority and consists of a representative from each member society and the presidents of the Continental Divisions. Member societies are organized into six continental divisions: Africa, Asia, Europe, Latin America, North America and Oceania.

== World Championship of Magic ==
The World Championship of Magic is held as part of FISM's world congresses. Competitions comprise stage and close-up disciplines, with prizes awarded in individual categories and Grand Prix awards.

At the 2025 championship in Turin, Italy, Francesco Della Bona received the Stage Grand Prix and Ibuki received the Close-up Grand Prix. The next World Championship of Magic is scheduled to take place in Busan, South Korea, from 9 to 14 July 2028.

=== World congresses and winners ===
The following table lists the World Championships and the first-, second- and third-place finishers, ties and special awards recorded by FISM. Category names reflect the terminology used by FISM for each edition.

Category	1st place	2nd place	3rd place	Other awards
29th — 2025 — Turin, Italy
Grand Prix — Stage	Francesco Della Bona (Italy)			
Grand Prix — Close-up	Ibuki (Japan)			
Comedy Magic	Not awarded	Artem Shchukin (Russia)	Juan Colas (Spain); Yannis Why (France)	—
General Magic	Léa Kyle (France)	Nikolai Striebel (Germany)	Calista (France)	—
Manipulation	Francesco Della Bona (Italy)	Hojung (South Korea)	Shifu Huang (Taiwan)	—
Mental Magic	MIND2MIND (United Kingdom)	Not awarded	Niccolò Fontana (Italy)	—
Stage Illusions	Not awarded	Alberto Giorgi & Laura (Italy)	Mag Edgard (Spain)	—
Card Magic	Not awarded	Tino Plaz (Switzerland); Francesco Fontanelli (Italy)	Kimoon Do (South Korea)	—
Micro Magic	Ibuki (Japan)	Duo (Spain)	Starman (Italy)	—
Parlour Magic	Mortenn Christiansen (Denmark)	Piero Venesia (Italy)	Jonio (Japan)	—
Invention	—	—	—	Alain Guerant (Belgium); Lucas Kaminski (Germany); Alberto Giorgi & Laura (Italy); Sergi Dolidze (Georgia); Tsiao Yang (Hong Kong); Nojima (Japan); Billy Hsueh (Canada)
28th — 2022 — Quebec City, Canada
Grand Prix — Stage	Laurent Piron (Belgium)			
Grand Prix — Close-up	Simon Coronel (United States)			
Card Magic	Markobi (France)	Pere Rafart (Spain)	Erik Tait (United States)	—
Comedy Magic	Mortenn Christiansen (Denmark)	Ramo & Alegria (Spain)	Marie Hélène (France)	—
General Magic	Laurent Piron (Belgium)	Ding Yang (China)	Zhu Mingzhu (China)	—
Invention	—	—	—	Ramo & Alegria (Spain); Daniel Mormina (Argentina); Zhu Mingzhu (China); HJ (Taiwan); Martin Eisele (Germany)
Manipulation	Artem (Russia); Junwoo Park (South Korea)	Eden (South Korea)	Francesco Della Bona (Italy)	—
Mental Magic	Anca & Lucca (Austria)	Rob & Emiel (Netherlands)	Mago Larry (Argentina); Andrea Rizzolini (Italy)	—
Micro Magic	Luis Olmedo (Spain); Simon Coronel (United States)	Jacob Schenström (Sweden)	Mr Triton (France)	—
Most Original Act	—	—	—	Stage: Ding Yan (China); Close-up: Gleb (Lithuania)
Parlour Magic	Shoot Ogawa (United States)	Vincent (Australia); Javi Rufo (Spain)	Jonio (Japan)	—
Stage Illusions	Yunke (Spain)	Doble Mandoble (Belgium)	Not awarded	—
Special Awards	—	—	—	Creativity & Artistic Vision: Topas (Germany); History Research Scholarship: Richard Kaufman (United States); Theory & Philosophy: Dani Daortiz (Spain); Special Award: Max Maven (United States)
27th — 2018 — Busan, South Korea
Grand Prix — Stage	Miguel Muñoz (Spain)			
Grand Prix — Close-up	Eric Chien (Taiwan)			
Card Magic	Bill Cheung (China)	Pere Rafart (Spain)	Javi Benitez (Spain); Alec Tsai (Taiwan)	—
Close-up	—	—	—	DK (South Korea)
Comedy Magic	—	Nathalie Romier (France)	Tutti li Family (Spain)	—
General Magic	Miguel Muñoz (Spain)	Read Chang (South Korea)	Han Manho (South Korea)	—
Invention	—	—	—	Manho (South Korea); Javier Botia (Spain)
Manipulation	An Ha Lim (South Korea); Florian Sainvet (France)	Nestor Hato (France)	Yukihiro Katayama (Japan); Yuki (Japan)	—
Mental Magic	Javier Botia (Spain)	Lucca & Anca (Romania); Yann Yuro (Germany)	Christopher Castellini (Italy)	—
Micro Magic	Eric Chien (Taiwan)	DK (South Korea)	Sergio Starman (Italy)	—
Most Original Act	—	—	—	Stage: Sang Soon Kim (South Korea); Close-up: DK (South Korea)
Parlour Magic	Marc Weide (Germany)	Axel Hecklau (Germany)	Sho Takashige (Japan)	—
Special Awards	—	—	—	Creativity & Artistic Vision: Derek del Gaudio (United States); History Research Scholarship: Steven Minch (United States); Theory & Philosophy: Jeff McBride (United States)
Stage Illusions	—	Yunke (Spain)	—	—
26th — 2015 — Rimini, Italy
Grand Prix — Stage	Hector Mancha (Spain)			
Grand Prix — Close-up	Pierric (Switzerland)			
Card Magic	Harred Wu (Taiwan); Shin Lim (Canada)	Hannes Freytag & Noguera (Germany)	Kelvin Chow (Hong Kong)	—
Comedy Magic	—	Chris Torrente (France)	Hakan Berg (Sweden)	—
General Magic	Young-Min Kim (South Korea)	Miguel Muñoz (Spain)	Hun Lee (South Korea)	—
Invention	—	—	—	Daniel Collado (Spain); Antonio Romero (Spain); Semba (Argentina)
Manipulation	Hector Mancha (Spain)	Lukas (South Korea)	Lee Chang Min (South Korea)	—
Mental Magic	Thommy Ten & Amelie (Germany)	Lucca & Anca (Austria)	Simon Thomas (Germany)	—
Micro Magic	—	Mario Lopez (Spain); David Pricking (Germany)	Seol Park (South Korea)	—
Most Original Act	—	—	—	Stage: Yann Frisch (France); Close-up: DK (South Korea)
Parlour Magic	Pierric (Switzerland)	Wolfang Moser (Austria); Henry Harrius (Hong Kong)	Magic Brothers (South Korea)	—
Special Awards	—	—	—	Creativity & Artistic Vision: Derren Brown (United Kingdom); History Research,Scholarship: Magic Christian (Austria); Theory & Philosophy: Roberto Giobbi (Switzerland)
Stage Illusions	—	Alexis Arts (Italy)	Jakob Mathias (Germany); Timothy Trust & Diamond (Germany)	—
25th — 2012 — Blackpool, United Kingdom
Grand Prix — Stage	Yu Ho Jin (South Korea)			
Grand Prix — Close-up	Yann Frisch (France)			
Card Magic	Jan Logemann (Germany)	Patrick Lehnen (Germany)	Zeki Yoo (South Korea)	—
Close-up	—	—	—	close-up: Yann Frisch (France)
Comedy Magic	Doble Mandoble (Belgium)	Mikael Szanyel (France)	Jean-Philippe Loupi (France)	—
General Magic	Marko Karvo (Finland)	Haon Gun (South Korea); Les Chapeaux Blancs (France)	Ta na manga (Portugal)	—
Invention	—	—	—	Tango (Argentina); Haon Gun (South Korea)
Manipulation	Yu Ho Jin (South Korea)	Lukas (South Korea)	Kim Hyun Joon (South Korea)	—
Mental Magic	—	Christoph Kuch (Germany)	Christian Bischof (Switzerland)	—
Micro Magic	Andost (United States)	Jaque (Spain)	Red Tsai (Taiwan); Vittorio Belloni (Italy)	—
Most Original Act	—	—	—	Stage: Ted Kim (South Korea); Close-up: Simon Coronel (Australia)
Parlour Magic	Yann Frisch (France)	Johan Stahl (Sweden); Matthew Wrigth (United Kingdom)	Pierric (Switzerland)	—
Special Awards	—	—	—	Creativity & Artistic Vision: Teller (United States); History, Research, Scholarship: Mike Caveney (United States); Theory & Philosophy: Eugene Burger (United States)
Stage Illusions	Prince of Illusions (Netherlands)	Cubic Act (France)	Guy Barrett (United Kingdom)	—
24th — 2009 — Beijing, China
Grand Prix — Stage	Soma (Hungary)			
Grand Prix — Close-up	Shawn Farquhar (Canada)			
Card Magic	Shawn Farquhar (Canada)	Kristian Nivala (Finland)	Olmac (France)	—
Comedy Magic	—	Brynolf & Ljung (Sweden)	Cheffmagic (Denmark)	—
General Magic	Soma (Hungary)	Ma Yanyan (China)	Siebensinn (Austria)	—
Invention	—	—	—	Jorge Luengo (Spain)
Manipulation	Yo Kato (Japan); Han-Seol Hui (South Korea)	Sebastian.Nicholas (Germany)	An Ha Lim (South Korea)	—
Mental Magic	—	Nicolai Friedrich (Germany); Rob & Emiel (Netherlands)	Toni Montana (Argentina)	—
Micro Magic	—	Vittorio Belloni (Italy)	Simon Coronel (Australia); Johan Stahl (Sweden)	—
Most Original Act	—	—	—	Stage: Charming Choi (South Korea); Close-up: Not awarded
Parlour Magic	Marc Oberon (United Kingdom)	Charlie Caper (Sweden)	Latko (Argentina)	—
Special Awards	—	—	—	Creativity & Artistic Vision : Jim Steinmeyer (United States); History Research Scholarship: Bill Kalush (United States); Theory & Philosophy: Juan Tamariz (Spain)
Stage Illusions	Julius Frack (Germany)	Magic Sky Group (China)	—	—
23rd — 2006 — Stockholm, Sweden
Grand Prix — Stage	Pilou (France)			
Grand Prix — Close-up	Rick Merrill (United States)			
Card Magic	Hélder Guimarães (Portugal)	Lodewijk de Widt (Netherlands)	Kiko (Spain)	—
Comedy Magic	—	—	—	Die Zauderer (Germany); Mikael Szaniel (France); Rick Merrill (United States); Stonkel (Germany)
General Magic	Eun Gyeol Lee (South Korea)	Die Zauderer (Germany)	Dion (Netherlands)	—
Invention	—	—	—	Mathieu Bich (France); Pierric (Switzerland); Mickael & Betty Ross (France); Cesaral Magic (Spain)
Manipulation	Dai Bin Chun (China)	David Sousa (Portugal)	Arthur Trace (United States)	—
Mental Magic	—	Timothy Trust & Julie (Germany); Juan Ordeix (Argentina)	Rob & Emiel (Netherlands); Jan Thomas Loewe (Germany)	—
Micro Magic	Martin Eisele (Germany)	Shawn Farquhar (Canada)	David Stone (France)	—
Most Original Act	—	—	—	Stage: Hugo Valenzuela (Argentina); Close-up: Rocco (United States)
Parlour Magic	Gaston (Germany)	Shawn Farquhar (Canada)	Guilhem Julia (France)	—
Special Awards	—	—	—	Creativity & Artistic Vision: Gaetan Bloom (France); History Research Scholarship: Eddie Dawes (United Kingdom); Theory & Philosophy: Tommy Wonder (Netherlands)
Stage Illusions	Sittah (Netherlands)	Hugo Valenzuela (Argentina)	Marc & Alex (Germany)	—
22nd — 2003 — The Hague, Netherlands
Grand Prix — Stage	Norbert Ferré (France)			
Grand Prix — Close-up	Jason Latimer (United States)			
Card Magic	Mago Migue (Spain)	Greg Wilson (United States); Iñaki (Argentina)	Etienne Pradier (United Kingdom)	—
Comedy Presentation	—	—	—	The Great Nardini (Scotland) (United Kingdom)
General Magic	Pat Perry & Archibald (Switzerland)	Simon Pierro (Germany)	Danny Cole (United States); Mirco Callaci (Argentina)	—
Invention	—	—	—	Jason Latimer (United States); Jan Ditgen (Germany); Arsene Lupin (Poland)
Manipulation	Norbert Ferré (France)	Eol Gyeol Lee (South Korea)	Kenji Minemura (Japan)	—
Mental Magic	—	Aaron (Belgium)	Chris Joker (Germany)	—
Micro Magic	Jason Latimer (United States)	Nicholas Einhorn (United Kingdom); Shawn Farquhar (Canada)	Ferenc Galambos (Hungary)	—
Most Original Act	—	—	—	Pat Perry & Archibald (Switzerland)
Parlour Magic	—	Ken Bardowicks (Germany); Chris Joker (Germany)	Robert Jägerhorn (Finland)	—
Stage Illusions	—	Prince of Illusions (Netherlands)	Dr. Marrax (Germany)	—
21st — 2000 — Lisbon, Portugal
Grand Prix	Scott & Muriel (Netherlands)			
Card Magic	Henry Evans (Argentina)	Mago Migue (Spain)	Thomas fraps & Gaston (Germany); Gregory Wilson (United States)	—
Comedy Magic	—	Die Zauderer (Germany)	The Maestro (United States)	—
General Magic	Mask (France)	Yumi (Japan)	Roxanne (Germany); George Saterial (United States)	—
Invention	Michael Ross (France)	Ariston (Argentina)	Kalle Hakkarainen (Finland)	—
Manipulation	Kenji Minemura (Japan)	Norbert Ferré (France)	Eduardo (Brazil)	—
Mental Magic	—	Luis Boyano & Isabella (Spain)	Nicolai Friedrich (Germany)	—
Micro Magic	Simo Aalto (Finland)	Manuel Muerte (Germany)	Gery (Austria)	—
Stage Illusions	Der "Hexer" (Germany)	Yunke (Spain)	Zauberteam Fick Flack (Germany)	—
20th — 1997 — Dresden, Germany
Grand Prix	Ivan Necheporenko (Russia)			
Card Magic	—	Boris Wild (France)	Jörg Alexander (Germany)	—
Comedy Magic	Tomoyuki Osaka (Germany)	Richard McDougall (United Kingdom)	Die Zauderer (Germany)	—
General Magic	Junge-Junge (Germany)	Koichi Sugaya (Japan)	Sonny Fontana (United States)	—
Invention	—	Juan Carlos Rodarte (Mexico); Michael Ross & Bethy (France)	—	—
Manipulation	Juliana Chen (Canada)	David (Hungary)	Roy Davenport (United Kingdom); Tel Smit (Netherlands)	—
Mental Magic	—	Fisselspecht (Germany)	Jörg Alexander (Germany)	—
Micro Magic	Thomas Meier (United States)	—	Simo Aalto (Finland); Manuel Muerte (Germany)	—
Stage Illusions	Carlos Barragán (Argentina)	Hans Klok & Sittah (Netherlands)	Sven Catello & Dario (Germany)	—
19th — 1994 — Yokohama, Japan
Grand Prix	Franklin (Germany)			
Card Magic	Ramblar (Argentina)	Pit (Germany)	Henry Evans (Argentina); Yuji Wada (Japan)	—
Comedy Magic	Die Plebsbuttel (Germany)	Funtasio (Fantasio) (United States)	Jean-Philippe Loupi (France); Dr. Marrax (Germany)	—
General Magic	Greg Frewin (Canada)	Victor Voitko (Ukraine)	Clemens Valentino (Germany)	—
Manipulation	—	Takamitsu Ushida (Japan)	Peter Marvey (Switzerland)	—
Mental Magic	—	Satori (Germany)	—	—
Micro Magic	Carl Cloutier (Canada)	Tim Ellis (Australia)	Rocco (United States)	—
Stage Illusions	—	Magic Cyril (United States)	Yuji Yasudax (Japan)	—
18th — 1991 — Lausanne, Switzerland
Grand Prix	Vladimir Danilin (Russia)			
Card Magic	Lennart Green (Sweden)	Roberto Giobbi (Switzerland)	Helge (Germany)	—
Comedy Magic	Gill & Dany (France); Mimosa (France); Enric Magoo (Spain)	—	—	—
General Magic	Juan Mayoral (Spain)	Alpha (France)	Vikj (Italy)	—
Invention	—	Timothy Wenk (United States)	Reginald (France)	—
Manipulation	Topas (Germany)	Arsene Lupin (Poland)	Cyril Harvey (France); Wladimir (Yugoslavia)	—
Micro Magic	Francis Tabary (France)	John Carney (United States)	Simo Aalto (Finland); Valarino (France)	—
Special Awards	—	—	—	Shankar Junior (India); Tim Ellis (Australia)
Stage Illusions	—	Tom Voss (Germany)	The Cantervilles (Germany)	—
17th — 1988 — The Hague, Netherlands
Grand Prix	Johnny Ace Palmer (United States)			
Card Magic	Jose Carroll (Spain)	Roberto Giobbi (Switzerland)	Gomez de la Torre (Spain)	—
Comedy Magic	Yann Brieuc (France)	Cha'Peau (Germany)	Tom Mullica (United States)	—
General Magic	Vic & Fabrini (Brazil)	Tommy Wonder (Netherlands)	Yuka (Japan)	—
Invention	—	—	Yogano Jr. (France)	—
Manipulation	—	Topas (Germany)	Markus Gabriel (Switzerland)	—
Mental Magic	—	—	Ronald Moray (Netherlands)	—
Micro Magic	Joe Given (United States); John Carney (United States)	Toyohisa Saikawa (Japan)	—	—
Stage Illusions	—	2nd Axel & Dirk (Germany)	The Napoleons (Japan)	—
16th — 1985 — Madrid, Spain
Grand Prix	Javier y Ana (Spain)			
Card Magic	John Cornelius (United States)	Gerd Winkler (Germany)	—	—
Comedy Magic	Sam Angelico (Australia)	Joel & Jill (France)	Robert baxt (United States)	—
General Magic	Davido (Norway)	Fukai & Kimika (Japan)	Scott Cervine (United States)	—
Manipulation	—	Mahka Tendo (Japan)	Peki (Germany)	—
Mental Magic	Santo & Monique (Germany)	—	—	—
Micro Magic	Paul Gertner (United States)	Johnny Ace Palmer (United States); Michael Weber (United States)	—	—
Stage Illusions	—	—	Turrini (Italy)	—
15th — 1982 — Lausanne, Switzerland
Grand Prix	Lance Burton (United States)			
Card Magic	Daryl (United States)	José Carroll (Spain)	Elisabeth Ravot (France)	—
Comedy Magic	Otto Wessely (France)	Topper Martyn (Sweden)	Terry Herbert (United Kingdom)	—
General Magic	Philippe Socrate (France)	Jay Scott Berry (United States)	Dominique Plessis (France)	—
Invention	Pavel (Switzerland)	—	—	—
Junior	Sylvia Diana (Netherlands)	—	—	—
Female	Brigitte Varga (Austria)	—	—	—
Manipulation	Davido (Norway)	Arsene Lupin (Poland)	Selim (Belgium); Rudolf Heuer (Austria)	—
Mental Magic	—	—	Toni Forster (Germany)	—
Micro Magic	Michael Ammar (United States); Aurelio Paviato (Italy)	Roland Gugganig (Austria)	—	—
Special Awards	—	—	—	Manipulation: Sanada (Japan); Fred Kaps: Lance Burton (United States)
Stage Illusions	Wayne Alan & Sandy (United States)	Tony Van Dyke (Germany); Orfi (Bulgaria)	Albe Fausto (Les 4 ensamble) (Italy)	—
14th — 1979 — Brussels, Belgium
Grand Prix	Ger Copper (Netherlands); Sultangali Shukurov & Sara (Russia)			
Card Magic	Jean-Jacques Sanvert (France)	Andre Robert (France)	—	—
Comedy Magic	Gili Frantzi (France)	Erino (Switzerland)	Ferry (Netherlands)	—
General Magic	Vito Lupo (United States)	The Fantasios (Switzerland)	Colin (France)	—
Invention (close-up)	Magic Christian (Austria)	—	—	—
Invention (palco)	Christian Fechner (France)	Mykog (France)	—	—
Junior	John Richard Hirokawa (United States)	Sylvia Diana (Netherlands)	Louis Gambino (Italy)	—
Female	Fee Eleisa (Germany)	Karin Noemi (Netherlands)	—	—
Manipulation	Magic Christian (Austria)	Peki (Germany); Sanada (Japan)	Pol (France)	—
Mental Magic	Hans Moretti (Germany)	Jo Patrick (France)	Alessandro de Luca (Switzerland)	—
Micro Magic	John Cornelius (United States); Tommy Wonder (Netherlands)	Wolff von Keyserling (Germany)	—	—
Special Awards	—	—	—	Sonny Fontana (Venezuela); Gambin (France)
Stage Illusions	Christian Fechner (France)	Die Agapis (Germany)	Many Thou (France)	—
13th — 1976 — Vienna, Austria
Grand Prix	Pierre Brahma (France)			
Card Magic	Trevor Lewis (Wales) (United Kingdom)	Tony Cachadiña (Spain)	Rainer Teschner (Germany)	—
Comedy Magic	Roy Gardner & Wittus Witt (Germany)	—	—	—
General Magic	Domi Nho (France)	Jan Torell (Germany)	The Asps (Finland)	—
Invention	—	—	—	Juliani (Switzerland)
Female	—	—	—	Aniko (Hungary)
Manipulation	Magic Christian (Austria)	Ger Copper (Netherlands)	Eberhard Baur (Germany)	—
Micro Magic	Heinz Freund (Austria)	Fabian (Aldo Colombini) (Italy)	Willi Seidl Jr (Austria)	—
Special Award	—	—	—	Kim Tag Song (North Korea)
Stage Illusions	The Morettis (Germany)	Valentin (Italy)	Katawu (Italy)	—
12th — 1973 — Paris, France
Grand Prix	Richard Ross (Netherlands)			
Card Magic	Juan Tamariz (Spain)	Andre Robert (France)	Tony Cachadiña (Spain)	—
Comedy Magic	Haraldini (Germany)	Topper Martyn (Sweden)	—	—
General Magic	Toreno (Norway)	Domi Nho (France)	Jan Torell (Germany)	—
Invention	—	—	—	Close-Up: Lipp (Germany); Stage: Mr Cox (Germany)
Manipulation	Christian (Austria)	Peter Gloviczki (Hungary)	Alexander (Italy)	—
Micro Magic	Camilo (Spain)	Jean Merlin (France)	Bill Zavis (United States)	—
Special Awards	—	—	—	Petr Krejcik (Petrick) (Czech Republic); Special Ladies: Aniko (Hungary)
Stage Illusions	Katawu (Italy)	Jo Patrick (France)	Hans Kazàn (Netherlands)	—
11th — 1970 — Amsterdam, Netherlands
Grand Prix	Richard Ross (Netherlands)			
Card Magic	Arturo de Ascanio (Spain)	Tony Binarelli (Italy)	Dick Koornwinder (Netherlands)	—
Comedy Magic	Armandi (Netherlands); Topper Martyn (Sweden)	—	—	—
General Magic	—	Valerie (United Kingdom)	Ad Klein (Netherlands)	—
Invention	—	—	—	Domi Nho (France)
Manipulation	Tel Smit (Netherlands)	Christian (Austria)	Horace (France)	—
Micro Magic	Rene Petrie (Belgium)	Los Mancos (Antón-Tamariz) (Spain)	Arturo de Ascanio (Spain)	—
Stage Illusions	—	Metro Magic Show (Netherlands)	—	—
10th — 1967 — Baden-Baden, Germany
Grand Prix	Di Sato (Harry Thiery) (Netherlands)			
Card Magic	Piet Forton (Switzerland)	Tony Binarelli (Italy)	Ulf Agdur (Sweden)	—
Comedy Magic	Jerry Bergman (United States)	Dr. Schramm (Germany)	Barón de Carlos (Spain)	—
General Magic	Joe Nex (Germany)	Zelpi (Italy)	Ted Lion (Netherlands)	—
Invention	Rigal (France)	Manfred Thumm (Germany)	—	—
Manipulation	Tel Smit (Austria)	Fred Sherry (Austria)	Björn Lönnqvist - Johnny Lonn (Sweden)	—
Micro Magic	Horace (France)	Franz Biemans (Netherlands); Dr. Schramm (Germany)	—	—
Stage Illusions	Manfred Thumm (Germany)	Rita & Arno Van Bolen (Germany)	Pan Zero (Germany)	—
9th — 1964 — Barcelona, Spain
Grand Prix	Mr Cox (Germany); Pierre Brahma (France)			
Allied Arts	—	—	—	Faquirism: Sager (Spain); Ventriloquism: Amigo Pelaez (Spain); Variety: Perico (Spain)
Card Magic	Piet Forton (Switzerland)	Guy Lammertyn (Belgium)	Rama (Netherlands)	—
Comedy Magic	The Maymó Brothers (Spain)	Karabias (Spain)	—	—
General Magic	Cornel & Monique (Netherlands); Al Preston & Valerie (Netherlands)	Finn Hauser (Finn Jon) (Norway); Claude Rix (France)	Maxel & Mary (Spain)	—
Invention	Rama (Netherlands)	Abbe Brehamet (France)	Rigal (France)	—
Manipulation	—	Harry Thiery (Netherlands)	Fred Sherry (Austria)	—
Micro Magic	Guy Lammertyn (Belgium)	Claude Rix (France)	—	—
Stage Illusions	Les Andreals (Switzerland)	Pikart & There (Spain)	—	—
8th — 1961 — Liège, Belgium
Grand Prix	Fred Kaps (Netherlands)			
Allied Arts	—	—	—	Pickpocketing: Dody Willtohn (France)
Card Magic	Piet Forton (Switzerland)	Ludow (France)	Eddy Taytelbaum (Netherlands)	—
Comedy Magic	—	—	—	The Maymo Brothers (Spain)
General Magic	Marconick (Netherlands)	Guy Lammertyn (Belgium)	Roberto & Hella (Netherlands)	—
Invention	The Maymo Brothers (Spain)	Jan Gall (Netherlands)	Ralpho (France)	—
Manipulation	Pierre Brahma (France)	Ron MacMillan (United Kingdom)	Claude Rix (France)	—
Mental Magic	—	—	—	John Todd & Jil (United Kingdom)
Micro Magic	Gus Southall (United Kingdom)	Kees Schoonenberg (Netherlands)	S. Martinez Muro (Spain)	—
Parlour Magic	—	—	—	Rama (Netherlands)
Stage Illusions	—	—	—	Les Andreals (Switzerland)
7th — 1958 — Vienna, Austria
Grand Prix	Tonny Van Dommelen (Netherlands)			
Card Magic	Eddy Taytelbaum (Netherlands)	—	—	—
Comedy Magic	P.Lodynski (Austria)	—	—	—
General Magic	Peter Pit (Netherlands)	Eduard Mazakian and Dagmar (Czechoslovakia)	Ronaldo (Netherlands)	—
Invention	Rama (Netherlands)	—	—	—
Manipulation	Maurice Rooklyn (Australia)	Claude Rix (France)	Pierre Brahma (France)	—
Micro Magic	Phoa Yan Tiong (Netherlands)	Gogia Pasha (India)	Fernando Maymo (Spain)	—
Special Awards	—	—	—	Lightning Calculation: Ernest Moingeon (France); Junior: Martine Schnaider (France); Female: Nicole Marteret (France); Special Award: John Ramsay (United Kingdom)
Stage Illusions	John Dee (Switzerland)	Willi Seidl (Austria)	—	—
6th — 1955 — Amsterdam, Netherlands
Grand Prix	Fred Kaps (Netherlands)			
Card Magic	Fred Kaps (Netherlands)	Jacque Courcelles (Belgium)	Eddy Taytelbaum (Netherlands)	—
Comedy Magic	El Wido (Sweden)	—	—	—
General Magic	Ad de Lunès (Netherlands)	Ritani-Richard Taniewski (Germany)	Stefani & Co. (Netherlands)	—
Manipulation	Marconick (Netherlands)	Jacque Courcelles (Belgium)	Jacky Fox (Belgium)	—
Micro Magic	Eddy Taytelbaum (Netherlands)	J.H. Van Rinkhuysen (Netherlands); John Ramsay (United Kingdom)	—	—
Originality	Mr. Jack (Netherlands)	—	—	—
Special Awards	—	—	—	Best assistant: Helga Horst-Muller (Germany); Special Award: Fred Kelly (Netherlands)
5th — 1952 — Geneva, Switzerland
Grand Prix	Denis Moroso (Italy)			
Allied Arts	—	—	—	Shadowgraphy : Carolus (France); Rag Pictures: Arline (France)
Female	Ann Hardy (Belgium)	—	—	—
Invention	—	—	—	Frank Cleaver (United Kingdom)
Manipulation	Juan B.Bernat (Spain)	Tomaneck (Czechoslovakia)	Andre'Bovet (Switzerland)	—
Mental Magic	Magdola & Carolus (France)	—	—	—
Micro Magic	Juan B.Bernat (Spain)	Dr. Weyeneth (Switzerland)	—	—
Originality	Peterson (Switzerland)	Magini (Sweden)	—	—
Presentation	Laquier (France)	Pedro (Sweden)	Magini (Sweden)	—
Stage	Edeling (Denmark)	Ralpho (France)	Mah Toh & Mah Jah (Germany)	—
Stage Illusions	Mireldo (France)	—	—	—
Ventriloquism	Jean de Merry (Switzerland)	Dany Mouse (Switzerland)	—	—
4th — 1951 — Paris, France
Grand Prix	Geoffrey Buckingham (United Kingdom)			
Allied Arts	—	—	—	Shadowgraphy: Geo Teros (France); Ventriloquism: Roger Perrin (France); Ventriloquism: Fred Roby (Switzerland); Juggling: Guillaume Clement (Belgium)
Comedy Magic	Jay Palmenr & Doreen (United States)	Thoki Yenn (Denmark)	—	—
Female	Hugette De Lysiolle (France)	Alice Maclay (United Kingdom)	Miss Elizabeth (United Kingdom)	Special mention: Yvette Domières (France)
Manipulation	Carlo Tornedo (Sweden)	Magicton (France); Salengros (France)	—	Special mention: Tonny Van Dommelen (Netherlands)
Mental Magic	The Salvins (United Kingdom)	—	—	—
Micro Magic	Sala (Switzerland)	Avara (Switzerland)	La More (Netherlands)	—
Originality	Monarque (Belgium)	Eddy Schuyer (Netherlands)	Leslie Barrie (United States)	—
Presentation	Albino & Tiny (Netherlands)	Odips (France)	Sala (Switzerland)	Special mention: Danilo and Wselden (country not specified)
Special mentions	—	—	—	Thoki Yen, Van Embden, Sam Rox (Denmark/Netherlands); Feller (France)
3rd — 1950 — Barcelona, Spain
Grand Prix	Mystica (Fred Kaps) (Netherlands)			
Invention	Jack Miltour (Switzerland)	Gay Bert (France)	—	—
Manipulation	Tomedo (Sweden)	Zano (Switzerland)	—	—
Micro Magic	John Ramsey (Scotland) (United Kingdom)	Lucson (France)	—	—
Presentation	Edeling (Denmark)	Nocha (Spain)	Dominique (France)	—
Special Awards	—	—	—	Comedy : Jay Palmer & Doreen (United States); Black Art: Macrodos Francisco (Netherlands); Hors-Concours: Jean Valton (France)
2nd — 1949 — Amsterdam, Netherlands
Grand Prix	Viggo Jahn (Denmark)			
Comedy Magic	Jerry Bergman (United States)	—	—	—
Invention	Maub van Embden (Netherlands)	—	—	—
Manipulation	Geoffrey Buckingham (United Kingdom)	John Ramsey (Scotland) (United Kingdom)	—	—
Micro Magic	Geoffrey Buckingham (United Kingdom)	Jacod van Moort (Netherlands); Ernst Mulhaupt (Switzerland)	—	—
Most Polished	—	—	—	Paul Baird (United Kingdom); Mrs. Flezki (Netherlands)
Presentation	Francisco & Moto (Netherlands)	De Flezkis (Netherlands)	Santos (Netherlands)	Special mention: Danilo and Wselden (country not specified)
1st — 1948 — Lausanne, Switzerland
Grand Prix	Willane (United Kingdom)			
Allied Arts	—	—	—	Prodigious Memory Rogello (France)
Invention	Burtini (United Kingdom)	—	—	Special Award: Gauthron (France)
Manipulation	Jean Valton (France)	Paul Baird (United Kingdom); Zano (Switzerland)	—	Special Award: Hans Trixer (Netherlands)
Presentation	Haakon Edeling (Denmark)	Henk Van Van Dijl (Netherlands)	Dominique (France)	—

== Member organizations ==
FISM member societies are organized into six Continental Divisions: Africa, Asia, Europe, Latin America, North America and Oceania.

Africa: College of Magic.

Asia: The Magicians Socirty of Bangladesh; BCM – Bangladesh Magicians Council; China Magic Art Society; SIMF – Shanghai International Magic Festival; Magician Association of Hong Kong, China; The Bangalore Ring; NMF / Nippon Magic Foundation; Japan Professional Magicians' Association; Society of Japanese Magicians; Magician's Network Japan (MNJ); The Magic Academy of Tokyo (MAT); Macao Magic Artist Society; Malaysia Magic Ring; Malaysian Magic Society; Korea Magic Association of DPRK; Inner Magic Club; Alexander Magic Club; BIMF Magic Club; Magic Union of Korea; The Great Wong Ring Singapore; 808 Magic Club; Black Hat Magic Association; Magicians' Association of Taiwan; TMA – Taiwan Magic Development Association; MATL – Magic Association; Siam Magic Club; TIMA – Thailand Magician Association; VMA – Vietnam Magicians Association.

Europe: Artistic Society “Hyjnoret”; Magischer Klub Wien; Magischer Cercle Wien; Magic Ring Austria; Belgian Magic Federation; Royale Cénacle Magique de Bruxelles; Cercle Magique Liégeois – Les 52; Magic Victoria; Magic Club Belgue; The Royal Club des Magiciens de Bruxelles; Koninklijke Vlaamse Goochelaars Van België; Union des Magiciens en Bulgarie; Quick Hands Project; Sark Magic Society; Český Magický Svaz, z.s.; MCS – Magisk Cirkel Sønderjylland; Magisk Club Aarhus; Suomen Taikapiiri Ry; The Association of Finnish Magicians; Fédération Française de Magie; Cercle Français de l'Illusion; Der Magische Zirkel von Deutschland; Academy of Magicians – Ακαδημία Ταχυδακτυλουργών Kristofer; Budapester Burese-Klub; The Israeli Society of Magicians; Circolo Amici della Magia – Torino; Club Magico Italiano; Club Magico Bartolomeo Bosco; Club Arte Magica (CLAM); Circolo degli Illusionisti Roma; Masters of Magic; Club Magico di Roma; La Corte dei Miracoli; Kyrgyz Magicians Federation; Association of Magicians of Baltic; Magica Club Lëtzebuerg; Nederlandse Magische Unie (NMU); Magiske Cirkel Norge; Magic Valongo Associação Cultural e Artística; Associação Portuguesa de Ilusionismo; Clube Ilusionistas Fenianos; Asociatia Magicienilor si Iluzionistilor din Romania; Teatrul de Magie; Magic Art Association; RAM – The Russian Association of Magicians; United Club of Magicians; Serbia Magic Ring; Sindicato de Magos Ilusionistas y Empresarios; Asociación de Magos Internacionales; Asociación de Magos Sevillanos Círculo Mágico; AMA – Asociación Mágica Aragonesa; AMIC – Asociación de Magos Ilusionistas de Cataluña; Circulo Ilusionista de Magos Alcarreños; CIP – Club de Ilusionistas Profesionales; FESMA – Federación Española de Sociedades Mágicas; GENI – Grup d'Estudi del Nou Il·lusionisme; SEI – Sociedad Española de Ilusionismo; Svensk Magisk Cirkel; Centre de Magie de La Côte; Club des Magiciens de Genève; CML – Club de Magiciens de Lausanne; Club des Magiciens de Neuchâtel; Magic Promotion Club Bern (MPC); MRS-CMS Magischer Ring der Schweiz; Society of Turkish Magicians; The Magic Circle; International Brotherhood of Magicians – British Ring.

North America: Canadian Association of Magicians; Academy of Magical Arts; Society of American Magicians; International Brotherhood of Magicians; Texas Associations of Magicians; The Chicago Magic Round Table; Magos Latino Americanos en Miami.

Latin America: Federacion Latino Americano de Sociedades Magicas (FLASOMA); Red Maso – Red de Magos Solidarios; Club Porteño de Ilusionismo; Entidad Magica Argentina; Círculo Mágico Argentino; Círculo Mágico de Chile; Círculo Mexicano De Ilusionistas.

Oceania: West Australian Society of Magicians (WASM).

== Bibliography ==
- Ghiurmino, Aldo (2015). FISM the Book. W. Meister & Company. ISBN 9788890607424.
- Maven, Max (April 1997). "A History of FISM". Genii: 28–63. ISSN 0016-6855.
