= Cardistry-Con =

Annual cardistry convention

- Status: Active
- Genre: Cardistry
- Locations: San Diego, California (2014); Brooklyn, New York (2015); Berlin, Germany (2016); Los Angeles, California (2017); Hong Kong (2018); Portland, Oregon (2019); San Diego, California (2022); London, England (2023); Tokyo, Japan (2024); New York state (2025); Copenhagen, Denmark (2026)
- Country: United States
- Inaugurated: 2014; 12 years ago
- Attendance: 1,000+
- Organizer: Dan & Dave Industries, Inc.
- Filing status: Non-profit
- Website: www.cardistry-con.org

Cardistry-Con is an annual three-day cardistry convention and interactive conference for cardists all over the world. Organized by American sleight of hand pioneers Dan and Dave Buck for the first time in 2014 to promote the art form of cardistry, its schedule includes interviews, panel discussions, live performances, exclusive video screenings, workshops, contests and giveaways.

== International ==
The first two conventions were held in the United States, but in recent years Cardistry-Con has been held in a different overseas location every second year.

The first to be held outside the United States was the 2016 convention, which took place in Berlin, Germany from July 8 to July 10. The 2018 Cardistry-Con was held in Hong Kong. The 2020 Cardistry-Con planned for Brussels, Belgium, was postponed in light of the coronavirus crisis. The 2023 Cardistry-Con was held in London where it was announced that the 2024 Cardistry-Con would be held in Tokyo, Japan

== See also ==
- History of cardistry
