= History of cardistry =

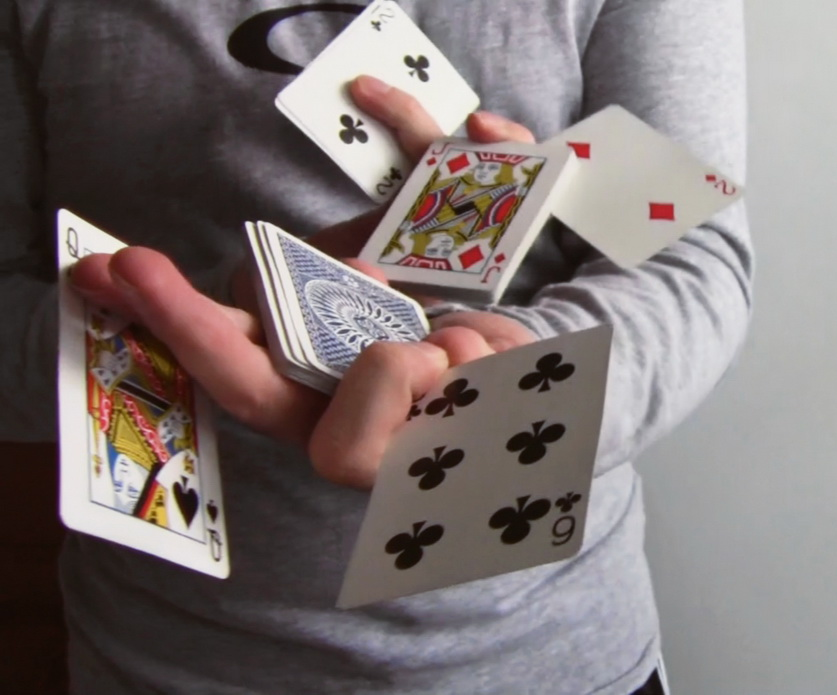
An advanced two-handed card flourish.

The art form of card flourishing, commonly referred to as cardistry (a portmanteau of card and artistry), grew out of simple flourishes used in close-up magic by magicians in the 1990s to early 2000s. Chris Kenner's notable two-handed Sybil cut from his 1992 publication Totally Out of Control has carried great influence and gave birth to a series of advanced flourishes which today represents the foundation of the performance art. Sleight of hand pioneers Dan and Dave Buck popularized cardistry on the world stage with their instructional DVD releases from 2004 and 2007. Journalist Kevin Pang of Vanity Fair characterized the art of card flourishing as, "It's yo-yo tricks performed by cardsharps with the street cred of a Parkour video. There's a name for it: cardistry."

== Roots in magic ==
When conjuring tricks with playing cards became popular around the 19th century, magicians would often include card flourishes in their performances to demonstrate their sleight of hand abilities. Unlike tricks, flourishes were intended to be visually impressive and appear difficult to perform. Some of the first flourishes to be documented include the Charlier Cut, Riffle Shuffle and Thumb Fan. Several sleight of hand bestsellers, such as S. W. Erdnase's The Expert at the Card Table from 1902 (which shared roots in gambling and cheating at cards), emphasized the importance of incorporating flourishes into tricks. Up until the 2000s, card flourishing was considered a mere subsection of close-up magic and not an independent performance art.

Cardistry is a portmanteau of "card" and "artistry." The term itself was published as early as December 19, 1899, on page 3 of The Portsmouth Herald, which reported a performance of Boston "magician and cardist" Bennett Springer. The short article spoke of Springer's "tricks in cardistry, sleights and flourishes with cards" and described them as "his manipulation of the wonderful" that "won him rounds of applause." Cardistry involves the use of hands to create cuts, displays, fans, patterns and sequences through the use of playing cards. Various armspreads, cuts, shuffles and springs can be used. The intent is to create a captivating motion and beautiful display. The effects are limited only by the types of card used, the imagination, and the degree of manual dexterity of the performer. The presentation is typically neither "illusionary" nor purportedly "magic". At least in part, the color and form of cards affect visual perceptions of the act. The visual style of the art form is often associated or compared to juggling, hackey-sack, mimes and even skateboarding.

== Five Faces of Sybil ==
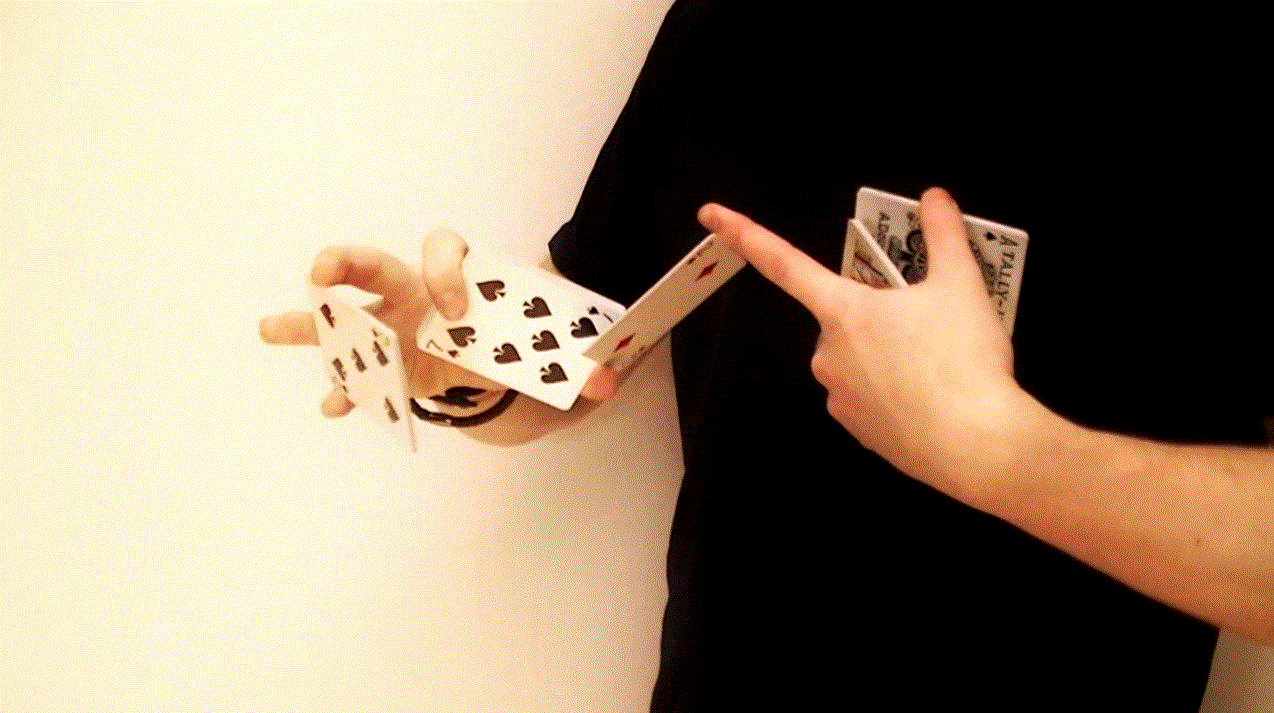
The ending face of Chris Kenner's Sybil flourish displaying five packets using all fingers.

In 1992, magic book publisher Richard J. Kaufman produced a book written by Chris Kenner called Totally Out of Control, a successful instructional book explaining magic effects with playing cards and other household objects. Among the many sleights featured was a two-handed card flourish on page 125 called "The Five Faces of Sybil". Using all fingers, Sybil ends with the deck divided into five distinct packets. Kenner himself describes Sybil in his book as "a quick cut flourish to demonstrate skill and dexterity". The flourish spawned a cycle of two-handed cut creations and formed the cornerstone of what is now known as cardistry. Journalist Kevin Pang of Vanity Fair magazine noted that "every cardist can deftly perform Sybil the way guitarists can run through a blues progression".

== An art form ==
Los Angeles–based magician Brian Tudor was one of many performers heavily influenced by Sybil. In 1997, he released a three-volume VHS tape dubbed Show Off, one of the first instructional products made by a known magician to only feature flourishes. Tudor's tape was well received, with some critics describing the flourishes and cuts taught as "eye-popping". The most notable invention from Show Off was the one-handed Revolution Cut, a variation of the common Charlier, where the top packet spins an additional 180 degrees.

In 2001, twin brothers and Sybil enthusiasts Daniel and David Buck (known as Dan and Dave) released Pasteboard Animations, another flourish-only instructional VHS tape. Although produced as a low-fi home video and relatively short compared to Show Off, it sold hundreds of copies at hotel lobbies and magic conventions at a cost of $25. In a Genii magazine review of the Magic Live convention in August 2001, the twins flourishes and Pasteboard Animations tape received mixed responses. Renowned magic historian Jamy Ian Swiss remarked:

It was an excellent show, though opinion was definitely mixed about the Buck boys, who sat and stared at their hands while oddly racing through flourishes. It serves no function except as eye candy. It's juggling, and juggling and magic are two separate things. Nevertheless, it's fucking cool to watch. Cool is cool is cool, capital C cool. And magic is traditionally uncool. It's always been the geeky kids.

In spite of the mixed responses from the traditional magic scene, Dan and Dave continued with their cardistry creations. In 2004, with the help of Kenner, the twins released an instructional DVD on cardistry named The Dan and Dave System. The System is perceived as having officially separated advanced card flourishing from card magic and defined the style of cardistry. Filmed with digital movie cameras at film studios and professional edited, the critically praised $30 DVD inspired thousands of sleight of hand artists all over the world to embark on cardistry. Four years later, the twins released a three-disc DVD set known as The Trilogy, showcasing some of the most comprehensive and difficult flourishes ever created. Retailing at $85 per copy, The Trilogy is the bestselling cardistry release of all time, having sold more than 25,000 units. Pang wrote that just about every cardist lists either the System or The Trilogy as the reason they got into card flourishing.

In a 2015 interview, Singaporean cardist Kevin Ho mentioned that cardistry grew in popularity during the 2000s because of promotion through social media and journalistic coverage. Another cardist from Singapore, Huron Low, explained:

A lot of new doors are opening. Earphone companies and watch companies want to see product placements [in our videos]. And there's a lot of focus now on cardistry as a lifestyle brand—caps, T-shirts.

== Cardistry convention ==
In response to the growing cardistry community, Dan and Dave organized the first cardistry convention and interactive conference to promote the performance art in 2014, called Cardistry-Con. The convention saw interviews, panel discussions, live performances, exclusive video screenings, workshops, contests and giveaways. The 2015 convention was attended by journalists from magazines such as Vanity Fair and Wired as well as television stations, all of which helped further popularize cardistry as an art. Its growth has been associated with its availability with the availability of videos, lessons and podcasts, which tend to make the art more transparent and available to all who are interested.

== Tools ==
Decks of playing cards are an essential part of the cardist's tools. Ordinary paper playing cards will do, but some cardists believe that the cards used should be particularly adapted to the task, and so qualities such as flexibility, stickiness, colors, and the artwork on the front and back of the cards can vary. Decks are now being created exclusively to be used for cardistry, and some of these can be relatively expensive. Some commonly known name brands in popular cardistry videos include The Virts, School Of Cardistry, Anyone Worldwide, and Fontaines. Other cardists prefer older, grimier cards, sometimes called "poop decks". (Note: At a recent convention, a presentation focused "on the qualities of older, grimier cards, colloquially known as poop decks—(1) cards stick together more easily, it turns out, and (2) you are correct, poop decks are playing cards kept by the commode.")

== List of notable practitioners or creators ==
- Lee Asher
- Dan and Dave Buck
- Lennart Green
- Paul Harris
- Bill Kalush
- René Lavand

== See also ==
- Card sharp
- History of juggling
- History of yo-yo
- History of hacky sack

== Sources ==
- Cestkowski, Jerry (2002). The Encyclopaedia of Playing Card flourishes. Printmeister Press. pp. 19–20. Archived from the original on 2018-02-28.
- Erdnase, S.W. (1995). The Expert at the Card Table: The Classic Treatise on Card Manipulation. New York: Dover Publications, Courier Corporation. ISBN 978-0486285979.
- Press, Symonds (2014). Simple but Mystifying Magic Tricks with Cards, Matches, Money and Glasses. Redditch, UK: Read Books, Ltd. ISBN 978-1473395190.
- Tarr, William; Ross, Barry (1976). Now You See It, Now You Don't! Lessons in Sleight of Hand. New York: Vintage Books. ISBN 0-394-72202-7.
- Wilson, Mark; Gibson, Walter B. (1988) [1975]. Mark Wilson's Complete Course In Magic. Philadelphia, Pennsylvania: Running Press, Courage Books. ISBN 0-89471-623-9.
