= Derek DelGaudio =

American interdisciplinary artist

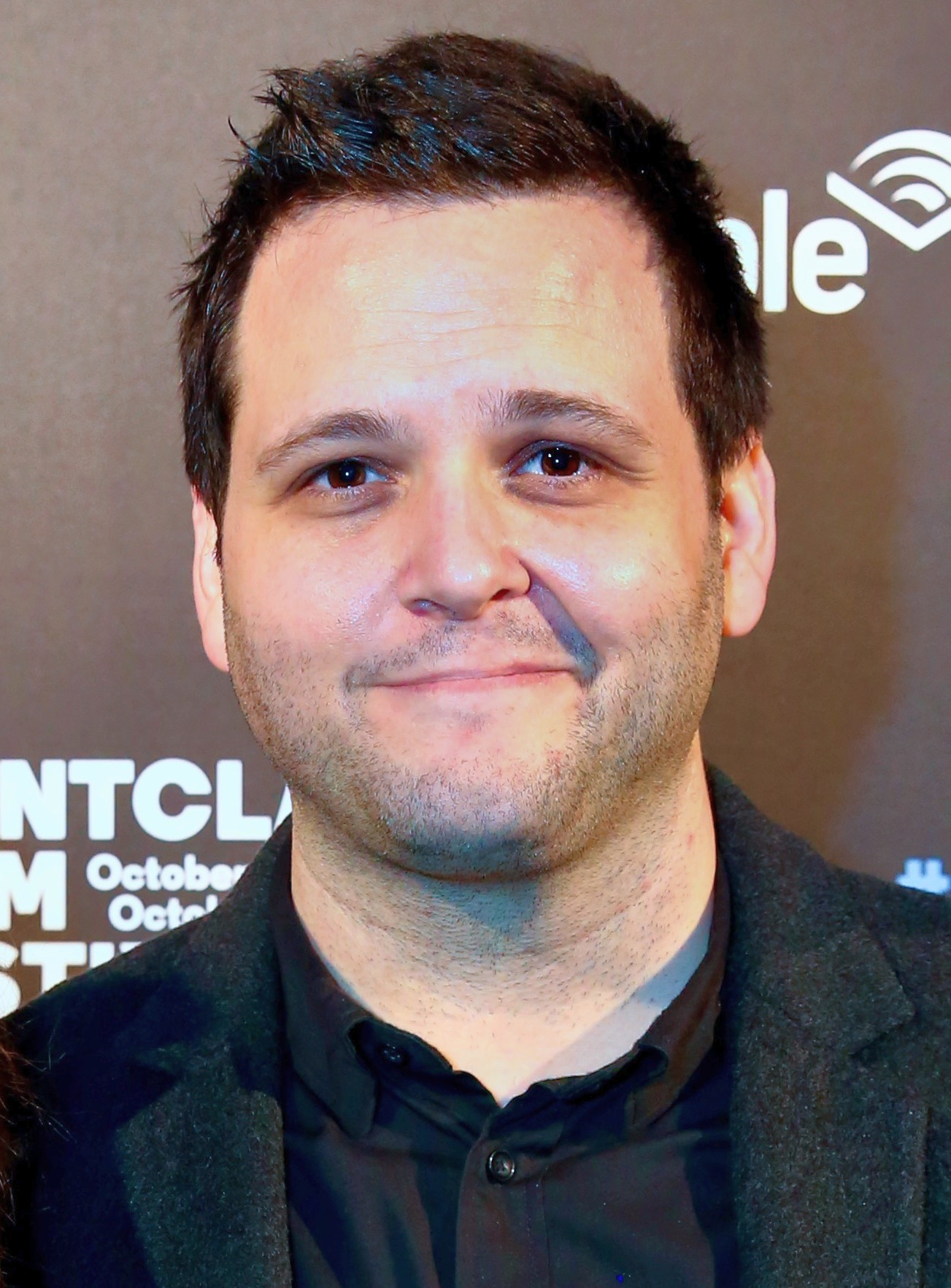
- DelGaudio in 2020
- Born: 1984 or 1985 (age 41–42); Huntington Beach, California, U.S.
- Occupations: Performance artist, writer, actor, magician
- Years active: 2010–present

Derek DelGaudio is an American interdisciplinary artist, primarily known as a writer, performer and magician.

== Career ==
DelGaudio created the theater show In & Of Itself, directed by Frank Oz, and co-founded, along with artist Glenn Kaino, the performance-art collective A.BANDIT, which has staged interventions at Art L.A. Contemporary in Santa Monica, The Ball of Artists, Art Basel Miami, LA><ART, and The Kitchen in New York. DelGaudio and Kaino also created The Mistake Room, a platform for situation-specific projects, as well as The [Space] Between, a "conceptual magic shop". They have also co-authored a book under the A.BANDIT name, A Secret Has Two Faces, containing interviews and stories from their careers in performance art and magic, as well as contributions from Marina Abramović, Ricky Jay, David Blaine and John Baldessari.

In 2014, DelGaudio was selected Artist in Residence for Walt Disney Imagineering. He has also consulted for television and cinema projects including The Carbonaro Effect and The Prestige. He wrote and co-starred (with Hélder Guimarães) in the show Nothing to Hide, which was directed by Neil Patrick Harris and opened off-Broadway at the Romulus Linney Courtyard Theatre at the Pershing Square Signature Center in New York City on October 23, 2013.

Frank Oz directed a film version of In & Of Itself which was released on Hulu on January 22, 2021.

DelGaudio's nonfiction book AMORALMAN: A True Story and Other Lies was released in March 2021.

In August 2021, Neal Brennan's one-man show, Unacceptable, debuted at New York City's Cherry Lane Theater, with DelGaudio as director.

In 2022, DelGaudio made his feature film acting debut in Steven Soderbergh's thriller Kimi.

== Reception ==
In the 2017 New York Times Magazine profile of DelGaudio, journalist Jonah Weiner wrote:

DelGaudio devises performances that combine sleight-of-hand with more theoretical preoccupations drawn from performance art, conceptual art and what's known as relational aesthetics: a tributary of the first two in which spectators become indispensable, unpredictable participants in creating an artwork's meaning.

== Awards and honors ==
- The Academy of Magical Arts Close-up Magician of the Year, 2011
- The Academy of Magical Arts Close-up Magician of the Year, 2012
- The Academy of Magical Arts Magician of the Year, 2016
- The Allan Slaight Award for "Sharing Wonder," 2017
- Fédération Internationale des Sociétés Magiques Award for Creative & Artistic Vision, 2018
- Grolla d'oro Award, Italy, 2019
- In 2011, the Conjuring Arts Research Center appointed DelGaudio their Director of Contemporary Conjuring.
