= John Mendoza (magician) =

American magician, author, and lecturer

- Born: John Frederick Mendoza; November 15, 1947
- Died: July 29, 2020 (aged 72); St. Louis, MO
- Occupations: Magician, author, lecturer
- Notable work: The Book of John (1978); Close-Up Presentation (1979); John Mendoza: My Best (2006)

John Frederick Mendoza (November 15, 1947 – July 29, 2020) was an American magician, author, and lecturer known for his contributions to close-up magic, particularly with playing cards, coins, and the cups and balls. A professional performer for more than five decades, he wrote many instructional books and manuscripts on sleight of hand and the presentation of magic. Among his best-known works were The Book of John (1978), Close-Up Presentation (1979), and the three-volume DVD series John Mendoza: My Best (2006), produced by L&L Publishing.

== Biography and career ==
Mendoza got interested in magic as a child after discovering a Svengali deck that his father had thrown away. In a 2016 interview, he recalled that an early visit to Ireland's Magic Shop in Chicago helped develop his interest in sleight of hand. He cited Bruce Elliott's The Classic Secrets of Magic as one of the books that most influenced him during his formative years.

Mendoza spent much of his career performing close-up magic for general audiences rather than on the magic convention circuit. His professional engagements took him throughout the United States and abroad, including Italy, Germany, Japan, and Saudi Arabia. He also performed for American military personnel overseas.

During the 1970s and 1980s, Mendoza traveled extensively as a magic lecturer, demonstrating and teaching material from his professional repertoire. He organized a series of gatherings known as Mendoza Magic Days, initially held in Moline, Illinois, and later in St. Louis, Missouri. The events attracted prominent close-up magicians, including Brother John Hamman and Ed Marlo. In 1986, Mendoza persuaded Marlo, who seldom lectured at conventions, to deliver a lecture at one of the gatherings.

Mendoza was also a teacher and mentor to other magicians. Among those who studied with him was Chris Korn, who later appeared in the television series Mondo Magic. A 2006 article in The Philippine Star identified Mendoza as one of Korn's early teachers in Missouri.

Although Mendoza made relatively few appearances at major magic conventions, his lectures and publications brought his work to the wider audience of magicians worldwide. Writing after his death, William Kalush of the Conjuring Arts Research Center described Mendoza's influence through his professional performances, conventions, and books.

Mendoza also lectured internationally in his later career. A feature published in the Italian magazine UMI/SMI Magic Magazine in 2016 reported on his return to Italy for a tour of magic clubs.

== Contributions to magic ==
Mendoza developed routines with cards, coins, cups and balls, and other traditional close-up magic apparatus. He was particularly know for his handling of the cups and balls, about which he published instructional manuscripts, including The Mendoza Cups and Balls Routine. His versions of the cups and balls and chop cup later appeared in instructional video collections alongside the work of other magicians.

His 1978 book The Book of John collected material from his professional repertoire, including card routines, coin magic, and his handling of the chop cup. It was followed by Close-Up Presentation (1979), a book concerned principally with the practical and theatrical aspects of magic performance rather than individual tricks. Subjects included the selection of material, practice, timing, misdirection, and routining. In a 2026 retrospective on Close-Up Presentation, magician Fredrick Turner discussed Mendoza's approach to practice, observing that nearly one-fifth of the book was devoted to the subject.

Mendoza also wrote books teaching the work of other magicians. These included Don't Stall, Stahl! (1978), featuring the magic of David Stahl; Don England's T.K.O.'s (1981); The Excellence of Dan Fleshman (1983); and The Right Stuff: The Magic of Chris Kenner (1985).

His work as an author was discussed by magic critic Jamy Ian Swiss. Reviewing Don England's later book Don England's Paradox in Genii in 2002, Swiss noted that Mendoza's earlier book Don England's T.K.O.'s had made a lasting impression in some circles of card magic. Swiss singled out England's routine "Phase 51", which helped popularize a version of the disappearing-deck climax to a card-to-pocket routine. Swiss also examined Mendoza's book in a 1994 review of Allan Ackerman's Las Vegas Kardma, discussing an earlier publication of one of Ackerman's card routines and questions of proper attribution.

== Instructional videos ==
Mendoza's work was also presented and taught in numerous instructional videos and DVDs.

In 2006, L&L Publishing released John Mendoza: My Best, a three-volume DVD collection featuring 33 routines from his professional repertoire. The series included card magic, coin routines, dice stacking, the chop cup, and several versions of the cups and balls. Among the effects demonstrated were "Routined Poker Mental", "The Ultimate Torn & Restored Card", and Mendoza's adaptation of Dai Vernon's cups and balls routine.

The series received a four-star review in the May 2007 issue of Magicseen. The reviewer praised the variety of material and the explanations accompanying each performance, observing that Mendoza's routines combined familiar classics with his own variations. The review also noted his dry sense of humor and the accessibility of much of the material to working magicians.

Mendoza appeared in Live & Personal: John Mendoza, an instructional recording featuring a complete close-up card performance followed by explanations of the routines. He was also represented in L&L Publishing's World's Greatest Magic collections, including a volume devoted to the chop cup, which featured his routine alongside those of Larry Jennings, David Regal, Gary Ouellet, and other performers.

== Death ==
Mendoza died on July 29, 2020, in St. Louis, Missouri, at the age of 72.

Following his death, Bill Kalush announced that the Conjuring Arts Research Center had acquired the exclusive copyrights to Mendoza's personal publications, with plans to preserve and republish his work.
