= History of juggling =

The art of juggling has existed in various cultures throughout history. The first depictions were found in ancient Egypt, China, Greece, and Rome, as well as medieval and modern societies.

== Ancient Egypt ==
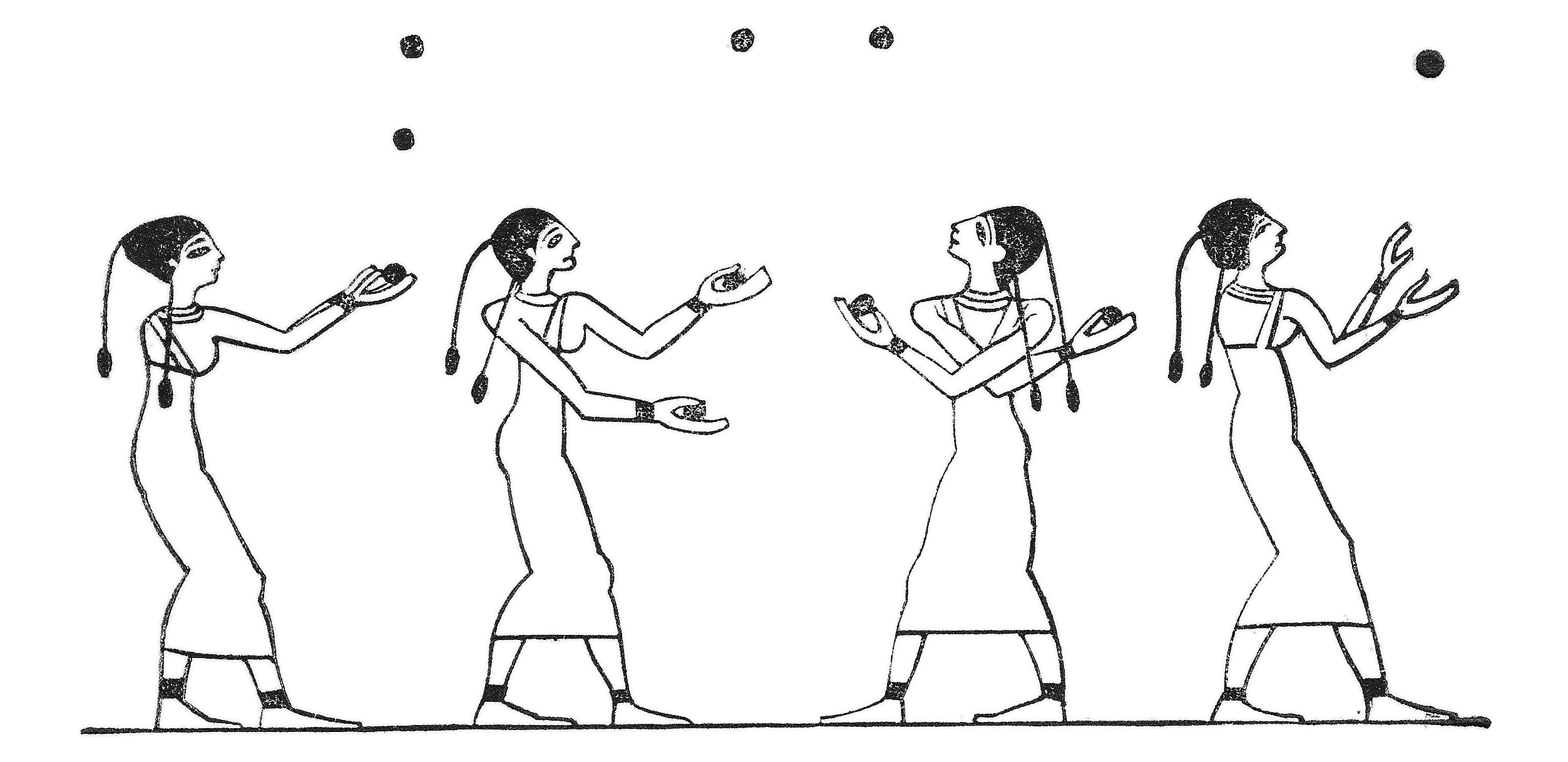
This Egyptian wall painting from the wall of Tomb 15 at Beni Hasan appears to depict toss jugglers.

The earliest record of toss juggling is a painting dated between 1994–1781 BC, during the Middle Kingdom period of Ancient Egypt, on the wall of Tomb 15 in Egypt's Beni Hasan cemetery complex. This tomb belonged to Baqet III, a provincial governor of Menat-Khufu (present day Minya) during the later years of the Eleventh Dynasty of Egypt. It depicts female dancers and acrobats juggling up to three balls, and one of the girls juggling with her arms crossed.

In another Beni Hasan painting, four girls are playing a juggling game in which two girls throw and catch a ball while being carried on the backs of the others. Arthur Watson, in his 1907 article for The Reliquary and Illustrated Archaeologist, suggests that if a player dropped the ball in this game, it became that player's turn to become the bearer.

Brooklyn Museum associate curator Dr. Robert Bianchi suggests that the appearance of jugglers in the Beni Hassan tomb may be "an analogy between balls and circular mirrors, as round things were used to represent solar objects, birth and death."

== Ancient China ==
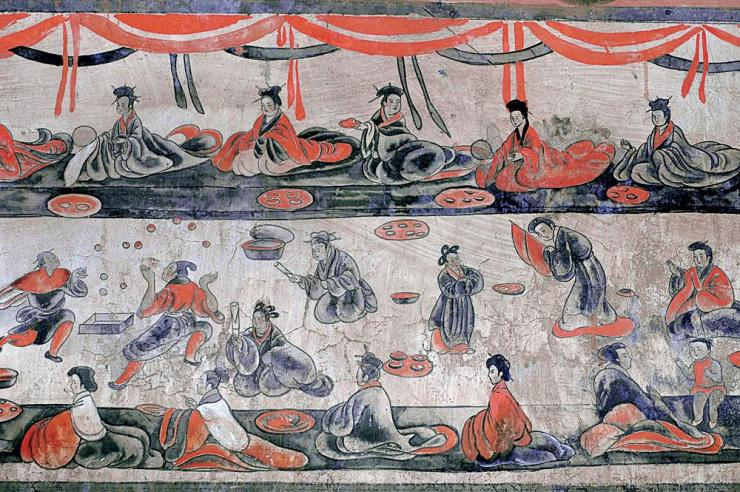
Jugglers from a mural section of the Dahuting Tomb (Chinese: 打虎亭汉墓; pinyin: Dahuting Han mu ) of the late Eastern Han Dynasty (25–220 AD), Zhengzhou, Henan province, China

Lanzi juggling seven swords, from a collection of Ming Dynasty (1368 to 1644 AD) woodcuts

References to jugglers in Chinese literature from the Spring and Autumn period indicate that toss juggling was a well-developed form of ancient Chinese art.

Xiong Yiliao (Chinese: 熊宜僚; pinyin: Xióng Yiliáo), was a Chu warrior who fought under King Zhuang of Chu (ruled 613–591 BC) during the Spring and Autumn period of Chinese history. Ancient Chinese annals state that he practiced nòngwán, "throwing multiple objects up and down without dropping". During a battle in about 603 BC between the states of Chu and Song, Xiong Yiliao stepped out between the armies and juggled nine balls, which so amazed the Song troops that all five hundred of them turned and fled, allowing the Chu army to win a complete victory. As Xu Wugui recounts in Chapter 24 of the Zhuangzi, "Yiliao of Shinan juggled balls, and the conflict between the two states was ended."

Lanzi (Chinese: 蘭子; pinyin: Lánzi), another juggler from the Spring and Autumn period who is mentioned in the Chinese annals, lived during the reign of Duke Yuan of Song (531–517 BC). Roughly translated, Chapter 8 of the Liezi, an ancient collection of Daoist sayings, reads as follows:

In the State of Song there lived a man named Lanzi, who sought favor from Lord Yuan of Song for his skills. Lord Yuan of Song summoned him, and he performed on stilts that were twice as long as his body and attached to his legs. He walked and ran on them, and he also juggled seven swords, alternately throwing them and always keeping five swords in the air. Lord Yuan was amazed, and at once he granted Lanzi gold and silk.

The passage states that Lanzi juggled the jian, a straight, double-edged sword which was used during the Spring and Autumn period. According to Jian Zhao in The Early Warrior and the Birth of the Xia, Lanzi was a general term for itinerant entertainers in pre-Qin and Han times.

== Ancient Greece ==
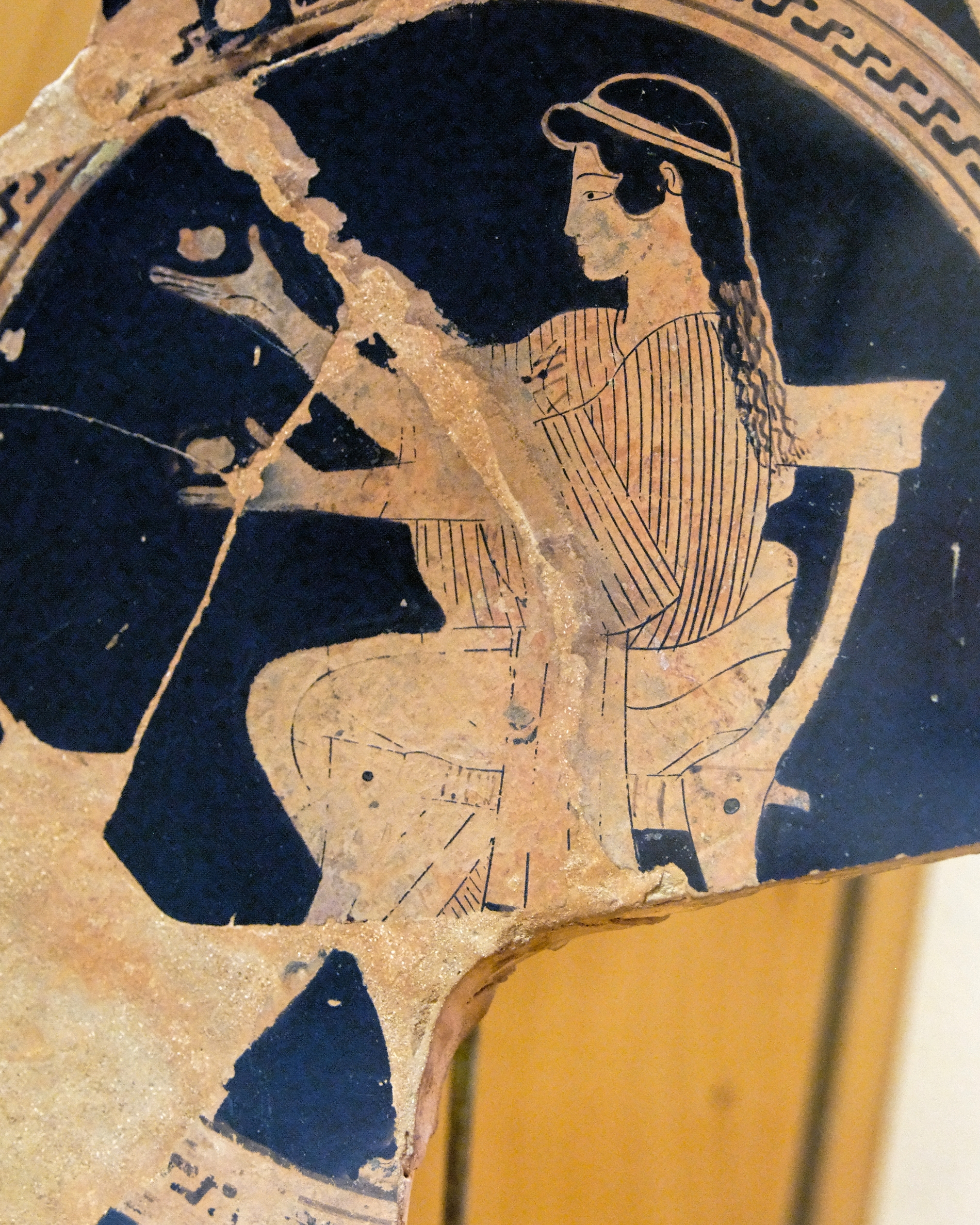
Seated girl juggling. Fragmented tondo of an Attic red-figure kylix, 470–460 BC, Regional Archaeological Museum "Antonio Salinas", Palermo, 3d floor, Greek ceramics

Guhl and Koner, in The Life of the Greeks and Romans, describe the jugglers of ancient Greece:

Jugglers of both sexes, either single or in gangs, were common all over Greece, putting up their booths, as Xenophon says, wherever money and silly people could be found. These frequently amused the guests at drinking-feasts with their tricks. The reputation of this class of people was anything but above suspicion, as is proved by the verse of Manetho ("Apotheles," iv., 276), in which they are described as the "birds of the country, the foulest brood of the city." Male and female jugglers jumped forward and backward over swords or tables; girls threw up and caught again a number of balls or hoops to the accompaniment of a musical instrument; others displayed an astounding skill with their feet and toes while standing on their hands.

Juggling, acrobatics, and other games of skill appear frequently in Greek and Etruscan tomb reliefs, coins, and vases. A terracotta statuette from Hellenistic Thebes shows a man balancing balls on his knee and head. Another example, a vase from Nola in the British Museum dating to 430 BC, shows a seated woman juggling two balls.

In his Symposium, set in 421 BC, the Greek historian Xenophon describes the appearance of a dancing girl at a dinner presided over by Socrates. Xenophon writes:

And at the instant her fellow with the flute commenced a tune to keep her company, whilst someone posted at her side kept handing her the hoops till she had twelve in all. With these in her hands she fell to dancing, and the while she danced she flung the hoops into the air—overhead she sent them twirling—judging the height they must be thrown to catch them as they fell in perfect time.

== Roman Empire ==
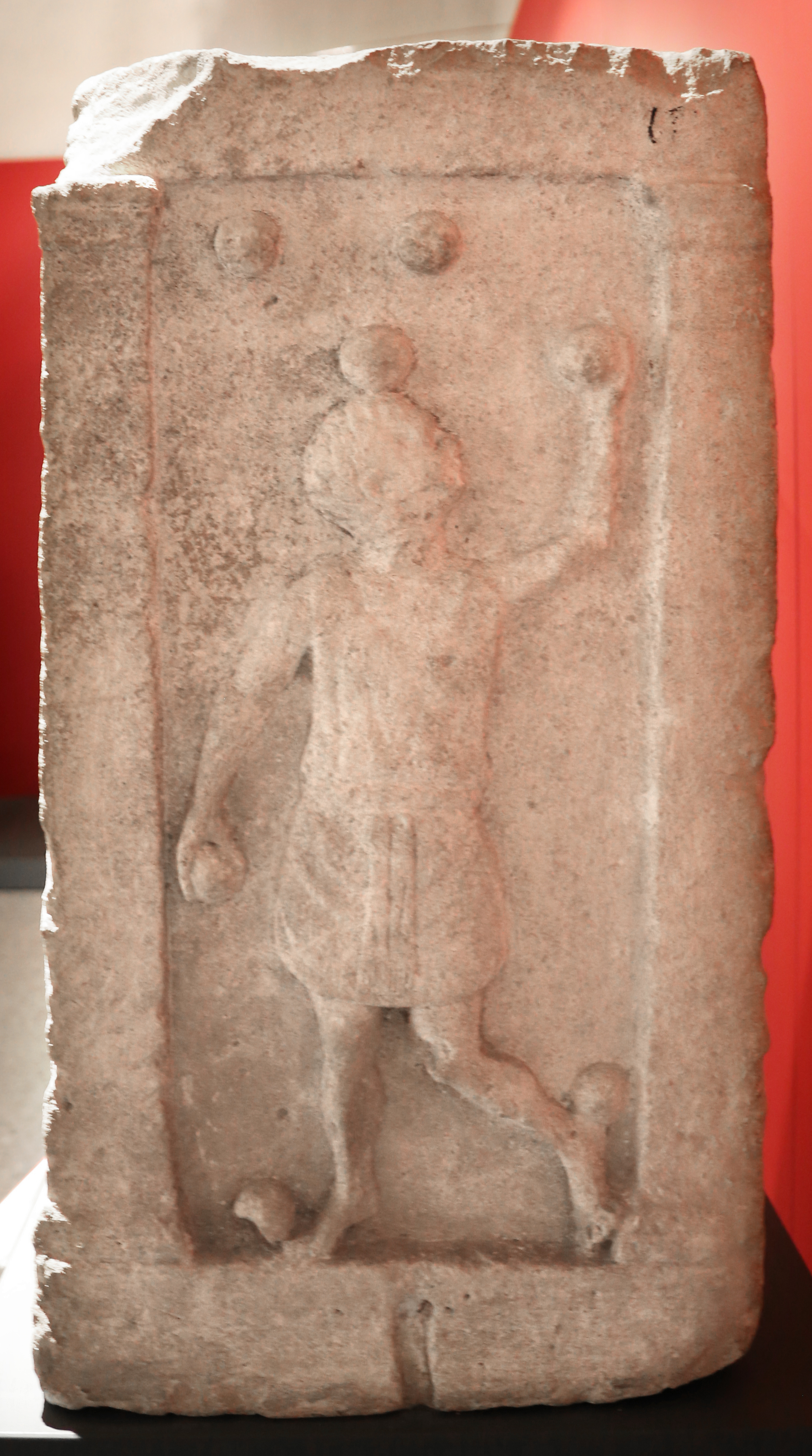
Juggler on the funerary stele of the child Septumia Spica

Many archaeological depictions of juggling in ancient Rome have been discovered. A monument with an inscription to Septumia Spica in the collection of the Museum of Roman Civilization depicts two relief carvings of a man toss juggling five balls while manipulating two more with his feet. A similar relief carving in Maffei's Museum Veronense of a consul giving the signal for the circus games to begin includes a detail showing a boy toss juggling five balls.

In addition to images depicting juggling, several Roman writers mention jugglers. For example, Marcus Manilius described jugglers in an astrological calendar, writing that a juggler's "quick hands supplied a constant stream of balls to his feet with which he played and ball after ball poured over the limbs of his body."

A second century AD epitaph honors a juggler named Ursus. (Note: Although many juggling history sources refer to this man as Ursus Togatus, the word togatus in this case merely indicates that Ursus was a Roman citizen who could wear a toga.) As opposed to the "pilarii" (toss jugglers), Ursus was a "pilecrepus," apparently performing body bounces and catches with a single ball. His inscription reads:

Ursus, the first Roman citizen to play properly with a glass ball with my players, to the great clamoring of the approving crowd in the baths of Trojan, Agrippa and Titus and especially in the baths of Nero.

Archaeologist Murray McClellan describes a millefiori glass ball on display at the Penn Museum which was probably used in a juggling game called trigon, and it may have been the same game described in the Ursus inscription. Although the rules of trigon are not fully understood, it appears to have involved three players posted at the corners of a triangle throwing multiple balls back and forth as fast as possible, catching them with one hand and tossing them back with the other.

Quintilian, in his Institutes of Oratory, draws a parallel between the skill of an orator who scans ahead in his reading to that of a juggler, writing:

Hence the possibility of those wonderful tricks of performers on the stage with balls and of other jugglers, whose dexterity is such that one might suppose the things which they throw from them to return into their hands of their own accord, and to fly whithersoever they are commanded to go.

Sidonius Apollinaris, a Roman officer leading a legion in the French province of Niemen, wrote in his letters that he enjoyed juggling three or four balls as a hobby for his own satisfaction and to entertain his companions in the legions.

The Roman poet Martial describes a juggler named Agathinus who performed a unique shield manipulation routine:

The skill of Agathinus, the master juggler, is overwhelming. With swift limbs he hurls the shield up in the air and catches it on his foot, on his back, on his head and on his fingertips, although the stage is slippery from sprinkles of perfume and the wind blows hard; it seems as though he is trying to avoid the shield, which is seeking his body of its own accord. To keep the shield in constant motion is child's play for Agathinus; to drop it would take practice.

The Tractate Sukkah of the Talmud says that Rabbi Shimon ben Gamliel (10 BC to 70 AD) could "take eight fire torches and throw them in the air and catch one and throw one and they did not touch one another." Another mention of torch juggling from around the third century AD appears in the letters of Alciphron, where an incident is described involving a woman whose husband "was attached to the Ionian lass who tosses balls and juggles torches."

An ancient mention of knife juggling comes from the early Church father Chrysostom, who in Antioch around 450 AD witnessed jugglers "tossing up knives in rapid succession into the air and catching them by the handle."

== Medieval Europe ==
In the Middle Ages juggling was one of many skills performed by entertainers and buffoons. Representations of juggling in the Middle Ages may be found in illuminated manuscripts in the British Museum. One manuscript (Cotton MS. Tib. C. vi, folio 30 v.), from an eleventh-century book on the life of Christ, shows an attendant of King David juggling three balls with his right hand and three knives with his left. William the Conqueror's minstrel Taillefer is recorded as performing a simple juggling trick with his sword at the Battle of Hastings in 1066, throwing and catching it, and then killing an English soldier.

The Boke of Saint Albans, published in England in 1486, mentions a "Neverthriving of Jugglers" as part of a list of collective nouns.

Legends and epic sagas from medieval folklore mention juggling. The Irish hero Cuchulainn is described "keeping nine apples, and his shield, and his sword in the air, that none of them fell to the ground." Similarly, in The Destruction of Da Derga's Hostel, a juggler named Tulchinne is described with "nine swords in his hand, and nine silvern shields, and nine apples of gold."

== Other cultures ==
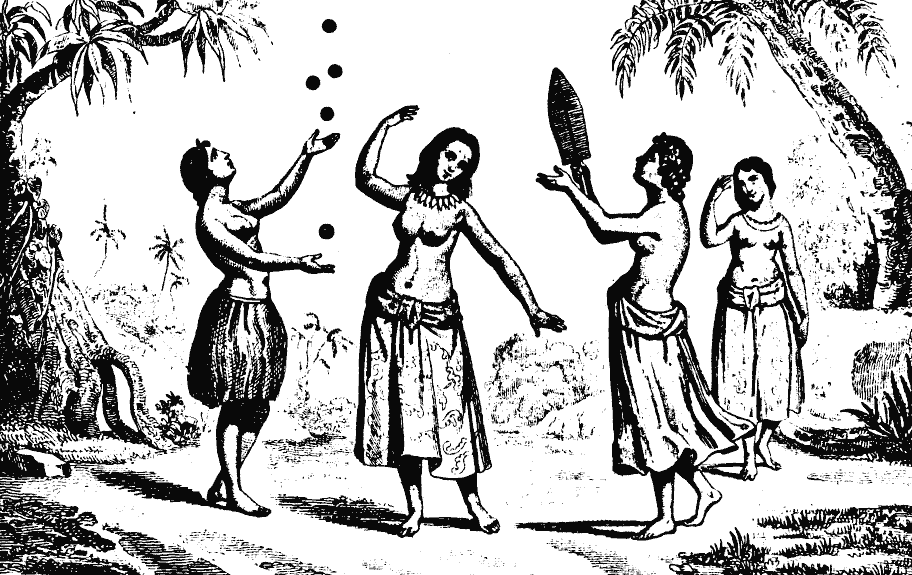
Girls (perhaps portraited on Malaspina's visit to Vavaʻu in 1793), performing different dances. From left to right: hiko (juggling), ula, meʻetuʻupaki (or a female equivalent), ʻūpē or fisipā (clicking the fingers).

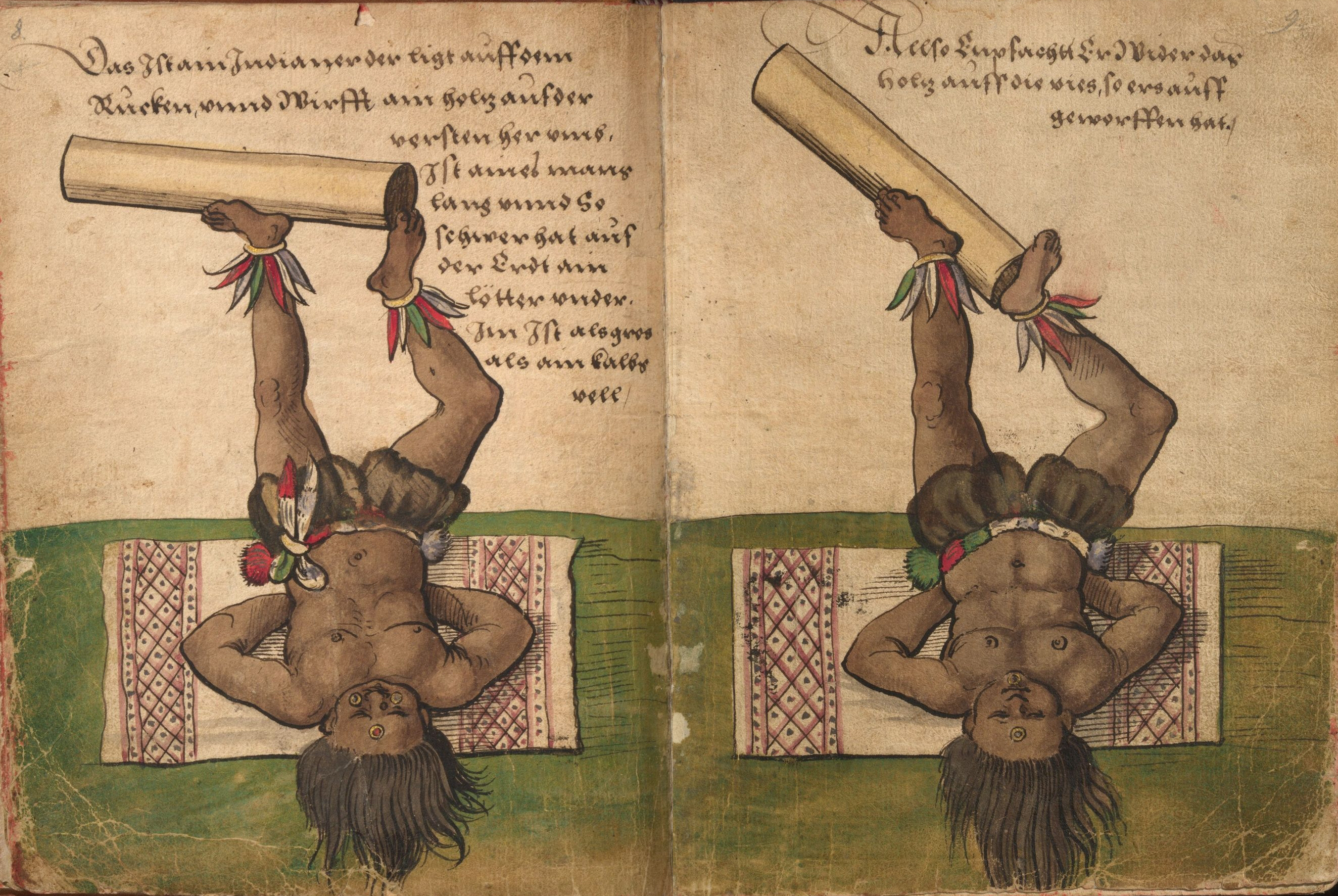
Aztec antipodist (Christoph Weiditz, 1528)

In 1528, Emperor Babur of Hindustan described in his memoir a group of jugglers simultaneously spinning seven rings on their forehead, thighs, fingers, and toes. In the same year, Aztec antipodist jugglers were brought to Europe by Hernán Cortés and painted by Christoph Weiditz.

Stewart Culin in Games of the North American Indians lists examples of juggling among the Naskapi, Eskimo, Achomawi, Bannock, Shoshone, Ute, and Zuni tribes of North America. One example, quoted from George Dorsey, describes a game played by Shoshone women who juggled up to four balls made of mud, cut gypsum, or rounded water-worn stones. Dorsey describes betting contests in which the women raced toward an objective such as a tree or tipi while juggling. This may be an early example of joggling.

Otedama is a traditional Japanese juggling game practiced by women throwing up to five balls in a shower pattern, often while singing rhymes. A similar game called hiko, involving throwing limes, gourds, or tuitui nuts in the shower pattern has been played by young girls in Tonga for centuries. The earliest record of juggling in Tonga is from Johann Reinhold Forster in 1773, who describes a girl of 10–12 years juggling five fruits on the beach. Incredibly, Polynesian women have been verified showering 7 tuitui nuts, and there are reliable reports of women showering up to 10 nuts.

== Animals ==
The history of juggling might precede humans as juggling-like behaviors, defined as the rhythmic, non-functional intentional aerial tossing and recapturing of objects have been observed as a form of play in nonhuman animals. Captive Asian small-clawed otters (Aonyx cinereus) while lying on their backs have been seen tossing pebbles between their paws. Male adult Hainan gibbons (Nomascus hainanus) have been observed repeatedly throwing and catching sticks while they move through the canopy. Long-tailed macaques (Macaca fascicularis), engage in stone-handling including them tossing and retrieving stones. A black-horned capuchin monkey (Sapajus nigritus cucullatus) was observed to have "picked up a coconut and performed a sequence of seven successive throws and recoveries, each executed with precision, rhythm, and apparent intentionality."

== Timeline of modern juggling ==
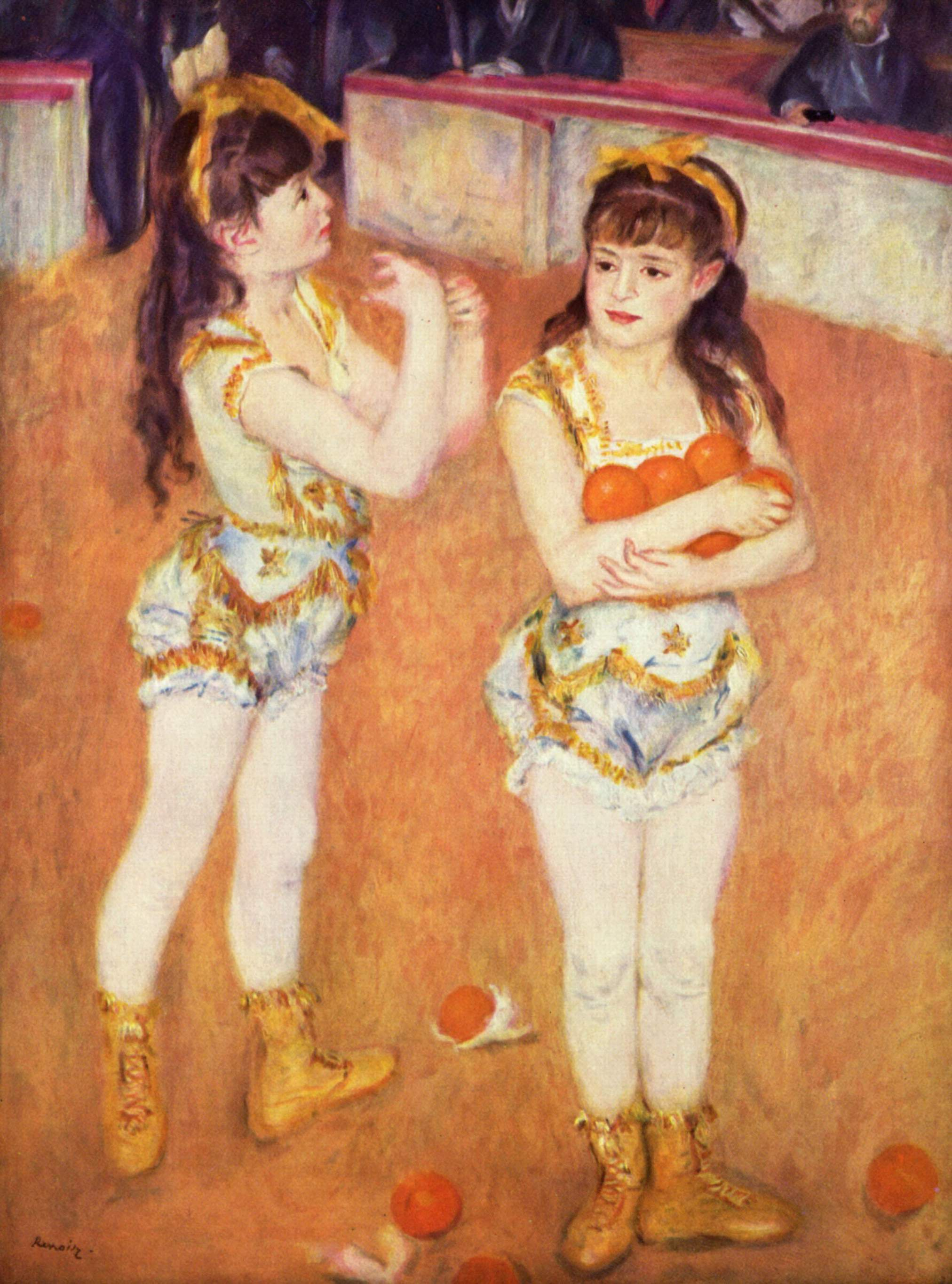
Pierre-Auguste Renoir, Acrobats at the Cirque Fernando (Francisca and Angelina Wartenberg) (1879)

1680 – Germany
Town Council of Nuremberg hires a "ball-master" who juggled and taught others juggling and other skills.

1768 – England
Philip Astley opens the first modern circus. A few years later he employs jugglers to perform acts along with the horse and clown acts. From then until the modern day, jugglers have found work and have commonly been associated with circuses.

1792 – North America
John Bill Ricketts opens the first American circus in Philadelphia. Later he opens shows in New York City and Boston, one of which was attended by George Washington, who had sold a horse to the circus.

1821 – England
William Hazlitt writes an essay called "The Indian Juggler" where he describes a juggler who he was very impressed by, which is assumed to be based on a performance by Ramo Samee, who is considered to be the first modern professional juggler. Ramo Samee was well-known in his field during this era.

Mid-late 19th century – Europe and North America
Variety and music hall theatres become more popular, and jugglers are in demand to fill time between music acts, performing in front of the curtain while sets are changed.

- Performers start specializing in juggling, separating it from other kinds of performance such as sword swallowing and magic.
- The Gentleman Juggler style is established by German jugglers such as Salerno and Kara.
- Rubber processing is developed and jugglers start using rubber balls. Previously juggling balls were made from balls of twine, stuffed leather bags, wooden spheres or various metals. Solid rubber balls meant that bounce juggling was possible. Inflated rubber balls lead to ball spinning.

1883 – North America
In Boston a new style of variety show is born. The format is a continuous show, the same 8-10 acts repeated over and over, the audience coming and going when they had seen all the acts. This was later known as Vaudeville.

1885 – England
Paul Cinquevalli (1859 –1918) made his debut at a circus in Covent Garden, London. Cinquevalli was the first juggling super-star, and was referred to by the British press as the world's greatest juggler.

Late 19th century – Early 20th century – North America
In the US the popularity of variety shows and vaudeville shows created great demand for professional jugglers. To distinguish them from other entertainers, jugglers were constantly developing new tricks, props, styles and characters, many of which survive to this day.

1896 – Siberia
Enrico Rastelli is born. Rastelli (1896–1931) is considered to be one of the greatest jugglers who ever lived. He is recorded as juggling 10 balls (though never 9), 8 sticks (small clubs) and 8 plates. He was also one of the first jugglers to use footballs (soccer balls) and other large rubber balls.

1912 – North America
Glow-props are invented. Adolf Behrend, the German Gentleman juggler Salerno builds a set of clubs with electric lights inside which changed colors as he juggles them.

1930-1950 – Europe and North America
Variety and Vaudeville shows start to decline in popularity due to competition from motion picture theatres, radio and television.

1947 – North America
The International Jugglers' Association is formed.

1984 – England
The world's oldest juggling shop opens in London.

=== American juggling firsts ===
- Jim Harrigan was the first tramp juggler, using cigar boxes and balls. He was also one of the first talking comedy jugglers, putting jokes into his routine.
- DeWitt Cook was the first to perform with "juggling clubs". Previously jugglers had only used sticks, torches or knives. Instead Cook juggled 3 Indian Clubs, normally used for arm-swinging exercises. Indian Clubs were made from wood, were very heavy and were shaped like a modern bowling pin. This design is still recognizable in today's specially manufactured, light, plastic juggling clubs.
- Charles Hoey was the first to juggle 4 clubs, though he could not stop juggling without dropping. When performing on stage the curtain had to be closed while he was still juggling so the audience wouldn't see him drop.
- Ben Mowatt was the first to juggle 5 clubs.
- Pat McBann was the first to juggle six clubs. He did 4 in one hand and 2 in the other, but died before he had it ready to perform in public.
- John Breen juggled 7 clubs for 35 right-handed throws. Breen also managed other very technical tricks such as a 5 club shower, as well as 5 club cascade with a head balance. He performed 6 clubs on stage. He died aged only 21 in 1912.
- The first record of two-person club passing is in 1885 by the juggling team "The Murdock Bros". They passed four clubs side-by-side them while standing on pedestals.
- The Devine Bros perform 6 club passing, facing each other, for the first time.
- The Three Mowatts were the first three-person club passing act, first performing in 1895. John Whitfield left the Mowatts to set up his own troupe called the Juggling Johnsons and created the first 4 and 5 person juggling.
- Jack Greene and Joe Piche were the first to pass 8 clubs.

== See also ==
- History of cardistry
- History of yo-yo
- History of hacky sack
