= Kimi (film) =

2022 American film by Steven Soderbergh

- Official release poster
- Directed by: Steven Soderbergh
- Written by: David Koepp
- Produced by: Michael Polaire; David Koepp
- Starring: Zoë Kravitz; Rita Wilson
- Cinematography: Peter Andrews (Note: Pseudonym for Steven Soderbergh)
- Edited by: Mary Ann Bernard
- Music by: Cliff Martinez
- Production companies: New Line Cinema; Extension 765
- Distributed by: Warner Bros. Pictures
- Release date: February 10, 2022
- Running time: 89 minutes
- Country: United States
- Language: English
- Budget: $3.5 million

Kimi is a 2022 American thriller film directed by Steven Soderbergh and written and produced by David Koepp. The film stars Zoë Kravitz. It was released on HBO Max on February 10, 2022, to generally positive reviews.

== Plot ==
Bradley Hasling, CEO of a tech corporation called Amygdala, gives an interview about the company's newest product, Kimi. Kimi is a smart speaker which controversially makes use of human monitoring to improve the device's search algorithm. Amygdala plans to soon hold an initial public offering, which stands to earn Hasling a fortune.

Angela Childs is an employee of Amygdala in Seattle who works from home monitoring incoming data streams from Kimi devices and making corrections to the software. She has anxiety and agoraphobia due to a previous assault, which has been exacerbated by the COVID-19 pandemic. Her primary human contact is with her romantic partner Terry, her neighbor from across the street who visits her in her apartment. One day while working, Angela receives a recording that appears to capture a violent sexual assault by a man named Brad. With the help of her coworker Darius, she accesses the information of the account holder, a woman named Samantha. Angela uncovers more of Samantha's recording, including one that sounds like her murder. It is revealed that "Brad" is in fact Bradley Hasling himself and that Samantha was his mistress. Bradley had ordered the murder from a hitman named Rivas. Angela transfers the recordings to a flash drive.

She reports the incident to her superior, who refers her to Natalie Chowdhury, an executive at Amygdala. Angela attempts to reach Chowdhury over the phone multiple times, but is eventually convinced to come to her office in person, with the promise that the FBI will be informed about the case. At the office, Angela is disturbed when Chowdhury seems reluctant to contact the authorities and makes reference to Angela's prior mental health leave. While waiting for the FBI to be contacted, she receives word from Darius that someone has deleted Samantha's voice recordings from the Amygdala servers and shortly after sees two unknown men enter the office. She flees and travels on foot towards the nearby FBI field office, while being tracked by Rivas and his accomplices through her cell phone.

The men catch up with Angela and attempt to force her into a van, but a group of nearby protestors prevent her from being abducted. However, one of Rivas's men, a hacker named Yuri, is able to deduce where she is headed from her search history. Angela is drugged and taken back to her apartment by her kidnappers, who plan to stage a home invasion to cover up her murder. On their way inside, they are interrupted by Kevin, a neighbor who also spends all of his time inside and became concerned after seeing Angela leave the house. Kevin is stabbed, distracting the assailants, but Rivas is already waiting inside her apartment. He confiscates the flash drive and begins to delete the recordings from Angela's laptop, but she uses her Kimi device to again distract Rivas and his men, escaping to a higher floor. She cobbles together a weapon using a nail gun left by a construction project in the apartment above her, using it to kill the intruders, with an assisting stab from Kevin. Terry, whom she had planned to meet up with, arrives just as she instructs Kimi to call 9-1-1.

An epilogue shows that Bradley Hasling has been arrested for Samantha's murder. Angela, sporting a new hairstyle, gets breakfast with Terry outside of her apartment.

== Cast ==
- Zoë Kravitz as Angela Childs
- Byron Bowers as Terry Hughes
- Jaime Camil as Antonio Rivas
- Erika Christensen as Samantha Gerrity
- Derek DelGaudio as Bradley Hasling
- Robin Givens as Angela's Mother
- India de Beaufort as Sharon
- Charles Halford as Tall Thug
- Devin Ratray as Kevin
- Jacob Vargas as Glasses Thug
- Rita Wilson as Natalie Chowdhury
- Betsy Brantley as Kimi (voice)
- Alex Dobrenko as Darius Popescu
- David Wain as Angela's Dentist
- Andy Daly as Christian Holloway
- Emily Kuroda as Dr. Sarah Burns

== Production ==
On February 25, 2021, it was announced that Steven Soderbergh would direct the New Line Cinema feature Kimi with Zoë Kravitz on board to star. In March 2021, Byron Bowers, Jaime Camil, Jacob Vargas and Derek DelGaudio joined the cast. In April 2021, Erika Christensen and Devin Ratray joined the cast. Principal photography began in April 2021 in Los Angeles, where the majority of interior scenes were filmed. In May, the production moved to Seattle to film exterior scenes.

== Release ==
Kimi was released on HBO Max on February 10, 2022. The film was released on DVD and digital on April 12, 2022.

== Reception ==
On the review aggregator website Rotten Tomatoes, 92% of 130 critics' reviews are positive, with an average rating of 7.5/10. The website's consensus reads: "A housebound thriller with a 21st century spin, Kimi finds director Steven Soderbergh in crowd-pleasing form – thanks in no small part to an outstanding performance from Zoë Kravitz." Metacritic, which uses a weighted average, assigned the film a score of 79 out of 100, based on 27 critics, indicating "generally favorable" reviews.

A number of critics have pointed out that many elements in Kimi pay homage to the work of Alfred Hitchcock and particularly his film Rear Window.
