= Yann Frisch =

French magician

Yann Frisch is a French magician. His signature magic trick is a cup and ball trick called "Baltass." A video of his sleight of hand Baltass performance was viewed 1.3 million times on YouTube in just over one week in 2012. His work has been featured on Laughing Squid, Boing Boing, MSN, Gawker, and The Blaze. Frisch won the Grand Prix in close-up magic at FISM 2012. He was also named Champion du Monde at the 2012 Beijing International Magic Convention.

In 2020, he plays a character in the movie Les 2 Alfred, which was selected for the Cannes Film Festival.
