= Dan and Dave (magicians) =

American sleight of hand practitioners

- Born: Daniel and David Buck
- Occupations: Cardists and magicians
- Years active: 2001–present
- Website: danandave.com

Daniel and David Buck (known by their stage name Dan and Dave) are American sleight of hand practitioners known for their contributions to the art of cardistry.

== Background ==
Growing up in Sonora, California, Daniel and David Buck wanted to become illusionists at the age of 12 after watching David Copperfield perform on television. After watching one of David Blaine's popular street magic specials, the twins switched to doing close-up magic and eventually just card magic. This interest grew when the brothers met magician Ricky Smith at a convention who lent them VHS tapes on card tricks by Lee Asher and Aaron Fisher. After learning the five faces of Chris Kenner's famous Sybil cut, Dan and Dave became fascinated with card flourishing and spent the next years practicing nothing but flourishes. At this point there was extremely limited information on what is now known as cardistry.

== Early work ==
Dan and Dave became mesmerized by a VHS instructional tape made by American magician Brian Tudor known as Show Off. The three-volume tape introduced new card flourishes such as the "Revolution Cut", a variation of the common "Charlier Cut". Inspired, the twins released their own Show Off-like tape in 2001. Dubbed Pasteboard Animations, it was filmed as a low-fi home video with a tripod-held camcorder, edited on a dual VHS tape deck. Pasteboard Animations was printed by a local production company and sold for $25 per unit. With several hundred copies sold throughout the brothers time in high school, it was purchasable at magic conventions, hotel lobbies or online. The VHS tape is no longer in production, but was featured as bonus material on Dan and Dave's System DVD from 2004.

== DVD releases ==
By 2004, Dan and Dave had created and mastered over 18 of their own flourishes. This was released as an instructional DVD called The Dan and Dave System (commonly referred to as simply the System) which was met with critical acclaim and commercial success. The DVD is believed to have spawned, or massively expanded, the art form of cardistry and inspired thousands of magicians to embark on card flourishing. Following this success, the twins released a three-box set entitled The Trilogy in 2007 which, unlike the System, also features card tricks, card productions, shuffles, table work, classic flourishes and finger exercises. The Trilogy was met with even bigger acclaim and success than the System, having sold 25,000 copies worldwide at a cost of $85.

== Other projects ==
In the 2013 caper thriller film Now You See Me, directed by Louis Leterrier, Dan and Dave performed many of their most notable card flourishes which was then edited to make it look like the main character and magician could do them. Dave had previously performed hand doubles for Jeremy Piven in the 2006 movie Smokin' Aces.

Dan and Dave, along with a group of other cardists from around the world, played a key role in organizing the first Cardistry-Con in 2014, held in San Diego, California during the month of April. The popularity of the event resulted in it becoming an annual three-day event.

Dan and Dave also performed the "Super Moves" card tricks on LazyTown Extra.

In 2013 they founded Art of Play as a subsidiary of their lifestyle brand Dan and Dave Industries, Inc. Art of Play features a carefully curated collection of designer playing cards, some of which were created by Dan and Dave under their own Art of Play label. In addition it features unique puzzles and amusements sourced from around the world. The Art of Play brand has developed into one of the world's leading sources for designer playing card, puzzles and magical home goods.

== See also ==
- Ricky Jay
- S. W. Erdnase
- Dai Vernon
- Adam Rubin
