= Nothing to Hide (magic show) =

Nothing to Hide is a theatrical magic show created and performed by Derek DelGaudio and Hélder Guimarães.

The show, written by DelGaudio, with magic choreography by Helder Guimarães and directed by Neil Patrick Harris, debuted at The Geffen Playhouse in Los Angeles on November 27, 2012, and opened in New York City, off-Broadway, at The Romulus Linney Courtyard Theatre at the Pershing Square Signature Center on October 23, 2013.
