= Sleight of hand =

Fine motor skills used to entertain or manipulate

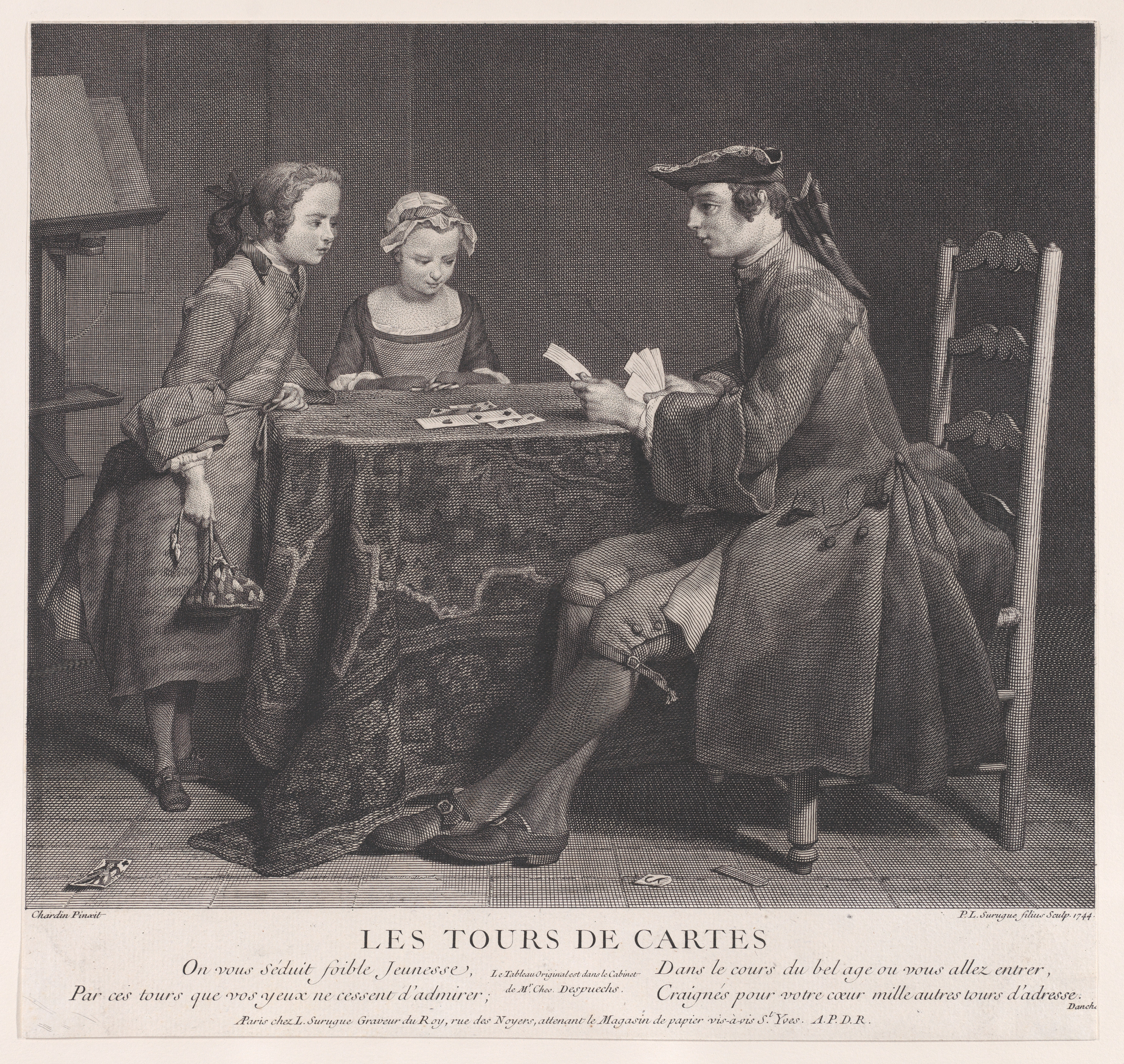
Illustration of man performing a sleight of hand card trick, circa 1744

Sleight of hand (also known as prestidigitation or legerdemain (/ˌlɛdʒərdəˈmeɪn/) comprises fine motor skills used by performing artists in different art forms to entertain or manipulate. It is closely associated with close-up magic, card magic, card flourishing and stealing. Because of its heavy use and practice by magicians, sleight of hand is often confused as a branch of magic; however, it is a separate genre of entertainment and many artists practice sleight of hand as an independent skill. Sleight of hand pioneers with worldwide acclaim include Richard Turner, Dan and Dave, Ricky Jay, Derek DelGaudio, David Copperfield, Yann Frisch, Norbert Ferré, Dai Vernon, Jerry Sadowitz, Cardini, Tony Slydini, Helder Guimarães, Tom Mullica, and Jason Ladanye.

== Etymology and history ==
The word sleight, meaning 'the use of dexterity or cunning, especially so as to deceive', comes from the Old Norse. The phrase sleight of hand means 'quick fingers' or 'trickster fingers'. Common synonyms of Latin and French include prestidigitation and legerdemain respectively. Seneca the Younger, philosopher of the Silver Age of Latin literature, famously compared rhetorical techniques and illusionist techniques.

=== Association with close-up magic ===
Sleight of hand is often used in close-up magic, where the sleights are performed with the audience close to the magician, usually in physical contact or within 3 to 4 m (10 to 13 ft). This close contact eliminates theories of fake audience members and the use of gimmicks. It makes use of everyday items as props, such as cards, coins, rubber bands, paper, phones and even saltshakers. A well-performed sleight looks like an ordinary, natural and completely innocent gesture, change in hand position or body posture. In addition to manual dexterity, sleight of hand in close-up magic depends on the use of psychology, timing, misdirection, and natural choreography in accomplishing a magical effect.

=== Association with stage magic ===
Sleight of hand during stage magic performances is not common, as most magic events and stunts are performed with objects visible to a much larger audience, but is nevertheless done occasionally by many stage performers. The most common magic tricks performed with sleight of hand on stage are rope manipulations and card tricks, with the first typically being done with a member of the audience to rule out the possibility of stooges and the latter primarily being done on a table while a camera is live-recording, allowing the rest of the audience to see the performance on a big screen. Worldwide acclaimed stage magician David Copperfield often includes illusions featuring sleight of hand in his stage shows.

=== Association with card cheating ===
Although being mostly used for entertainment and comedy purposes, sleight of hand is also used to cheat at casinos and gambling facilities throughout the world. Common ways to cheat at card games using sleight of hand include palming, switching, ditching, and stealing cards from the table. Such techniques involve extreme misdirection and years of practice. For these reasons, the term sleight of hand frequently carries negative associations of dishonesty and deceit at many gambling halls, and many magicians known around the world are publicly banned from casinos, such as British mentalist and close-up magician Derren Brown, who is banned from every casino in Britain.

=== Association with cardistry ===
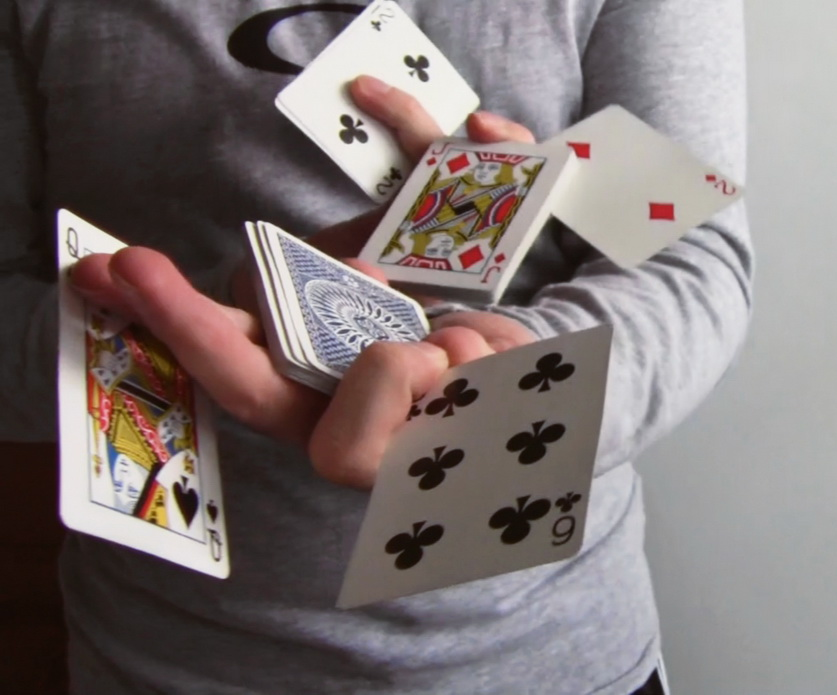
Cardistry is closely related to sleight of hand

Unlike card tricks done on the streets or on stage and card cheating, cardistry is solely about impressing without illusions, deceit, misdirection and other elements commonly used in card tricks and card cheating. Cardistry is the art of card flourishing, and is intended to be visually impressive and to give the appearance of being difficult to perform. Card flourishing is often associated with card tricks, but many sleight of hand artists perform flourishing without considering themselves magicians or having any real interest in card tricks.

=== Association with card throwing ===
The art of card throwing generally consists of throwing standard playing cards with excessively high speed and accuracy, powerful enough to slice fruits like carrots and even melons. Like flourishing, throwing cards is meant to be visibly impressive and does not include magic elements. Magician Ricky Jay popularized throwing cards within the sleight of hand industry with the release of his 1977 book Cards as Weapons, which was met with large sales and critical acclaim. Some magic tricks, both close-up and on stage, are heavily connected to throwing cards.

== See also ==
- Cups and balls
- Tenkai palm
