= Hélder Guimarães =

Portuguese magician and illusionist

Helder Guimarães
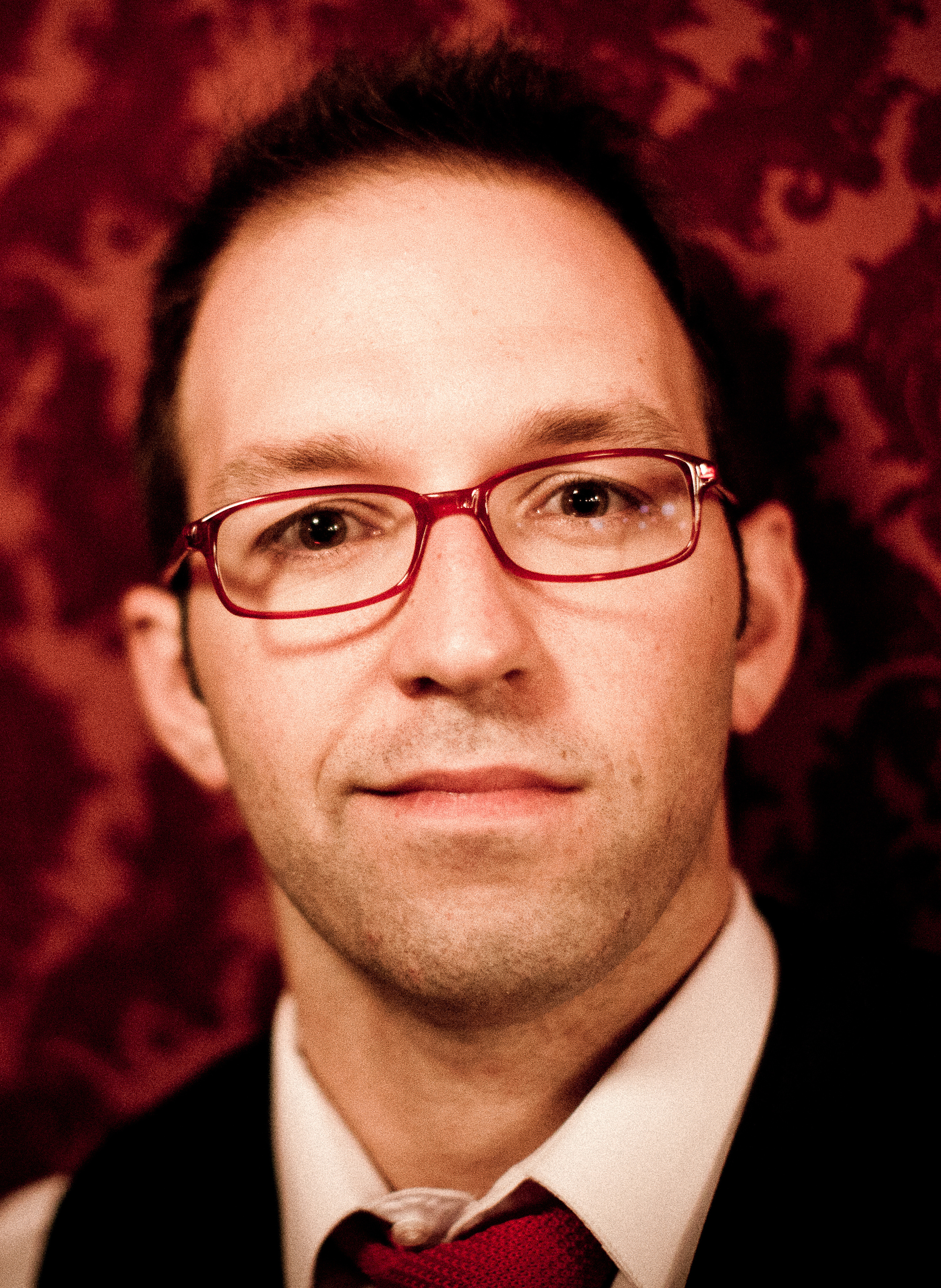
- Guimarães in 2013
- Born: November 16, 1982 (age 43); Porto, Portugal
- Occupations: Performer, magician, storyteller

Helder Guimarães (born November 16, 1982) is a Portuguese performer, magician, and storyteller. Known for his unique approach of sleight-of-hand magic, storytelling and performance, Helder's work has been featured at the Kennedy Center, TED Talks, Talks at Google and Off-Broadway productions.

His previous creations include Nothing to Hide, directed by Neil Patrick Harris, the Borrowed Time experience, the immersive experience Borrowed Time and the theatrical Verso, directed by Rodrigo Santos. The Los Angeles Times stated "he seems remarkably sincere and trustworthy for a man committed to deception," and The New York Times recognized him as "a Master of Illusions".

In 2019, he premiered his show Invisible Tango at the Geffen Playhouse, directed by Frank Marshall. The show received rave reviews by the LA Times, BroadwayWorld and Hollywood Reporter.

In 2020, during the COVID-19 pandemic, Helder broke new ground in the streaming performance world by creating The Present. Joining forces again with Frank Marshall and the Geffen Playhouse, the show received accolades from LA Times, Washington Post and New York Times. The show was considered by the LA Times and the Washington Post one of the 2020 Best Theatrical Productions.

In 2022 Helder returned in front of the live audience with his secret show Back to Wonder

Guimarães has consulted for entertainment entities like NBC, Disney, and Warner. He personally trained actresses Sandra Bullock and Cate Blanchett for their roles in the movie Ocean's 8.
