= Cardistry =

Performance art

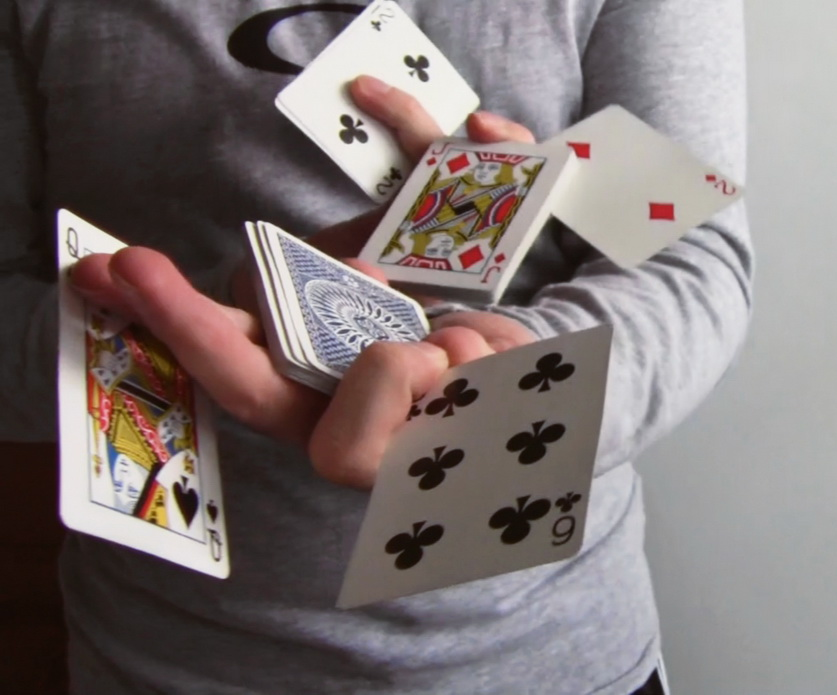
An advanced two-handed flourish

Cardistry is the performance art of card flourishing. Unlike card magic, cardistry is meant to be visually impressive and appear very hard to execute.

The term cardistry is a portmanteau of card and artistry. People who engage in cardistry are colloquially known as cardists.

Cardistry involves the use of hands to create cuts, displays, fans, patterns, and sequences through the use of playing cards. Various arm-spreads, cuts, shuffles, and springs can be used. The intent is to create a captivating motion and beautiful display. The effects are limited only by the types of cards used, the imagination, and the degree of manual dexterity of the performer. The presentation is typically neither "illusionary" nor purportedly "magic"; rather, it is more like juggling, mime, or similar entertaining activities.

== History ==
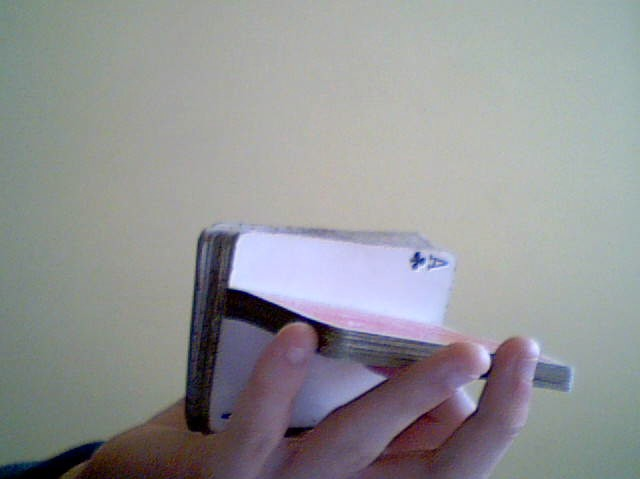
A Charlier one-handed cut

Conjuring tricks with playing cards became popular around the 19th century. At that time, simple card flourishes—such as the Charlier cut, riffle shuffle, and thumb fan—were often performed by magicians as a way of demonstrating sleight of hand.

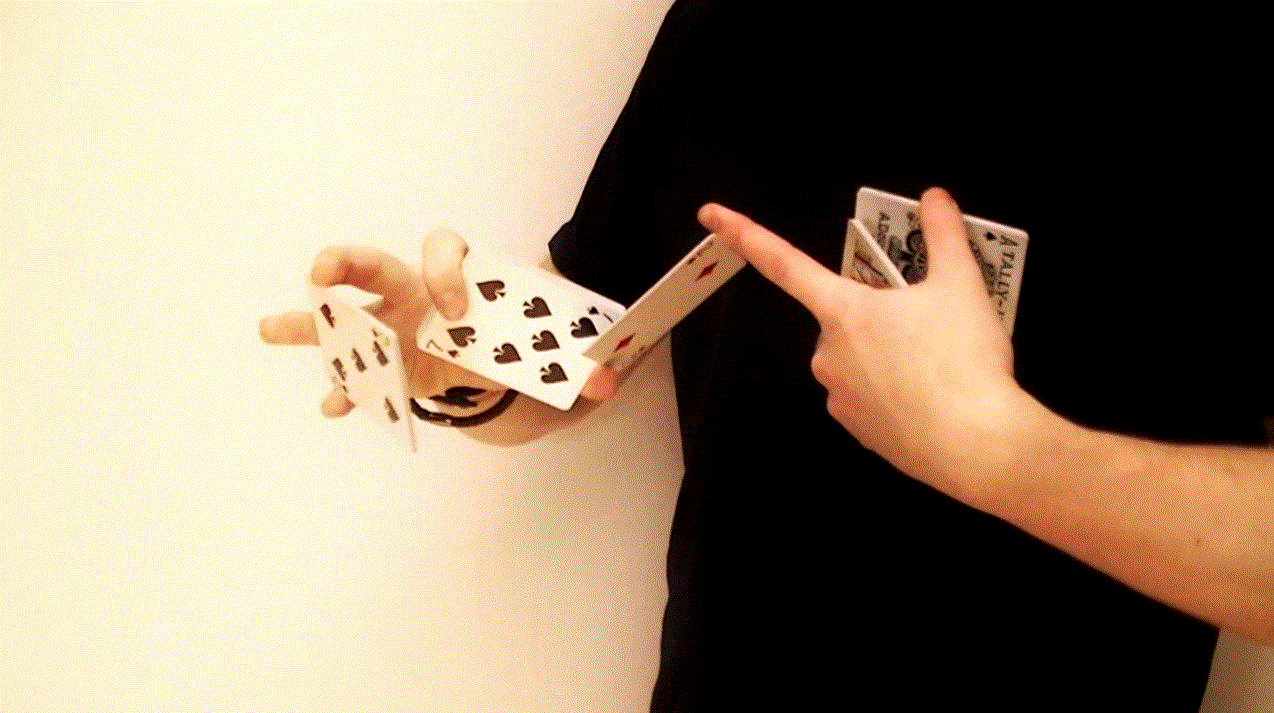
Chris Kenner's Sybil flourish

American magician Chris Kenner published Totally Out of Control in 1992, an instructional book concerning magic tricks with household objects. On page 125 was a two-handed flourish he called "The Five Faces of Sybil". Making use of all fingers, Sybil ends with a display of the deck in five distinct packets. Kenner referred to Sybil in his book as "a quick cut flourish to demonstrate skill and dexterity". The cut became the most notable creation from Totally Out of Control and would eventually form the nucleus of what is now known as cardistry. Kevin Pang of Vanity Fair magazine remarked that "every cardist can deftly perform Sybil the way guitarists can run through a blues progression".

Los Angeles-based magician Brian Tudor released an instructional VHS tape in 1997 dubbed Show Off which featured only flourishes, including numerous variations of Sybil. The tape was well received by critics and resulted in growing attention to card flourishing as a performance art.

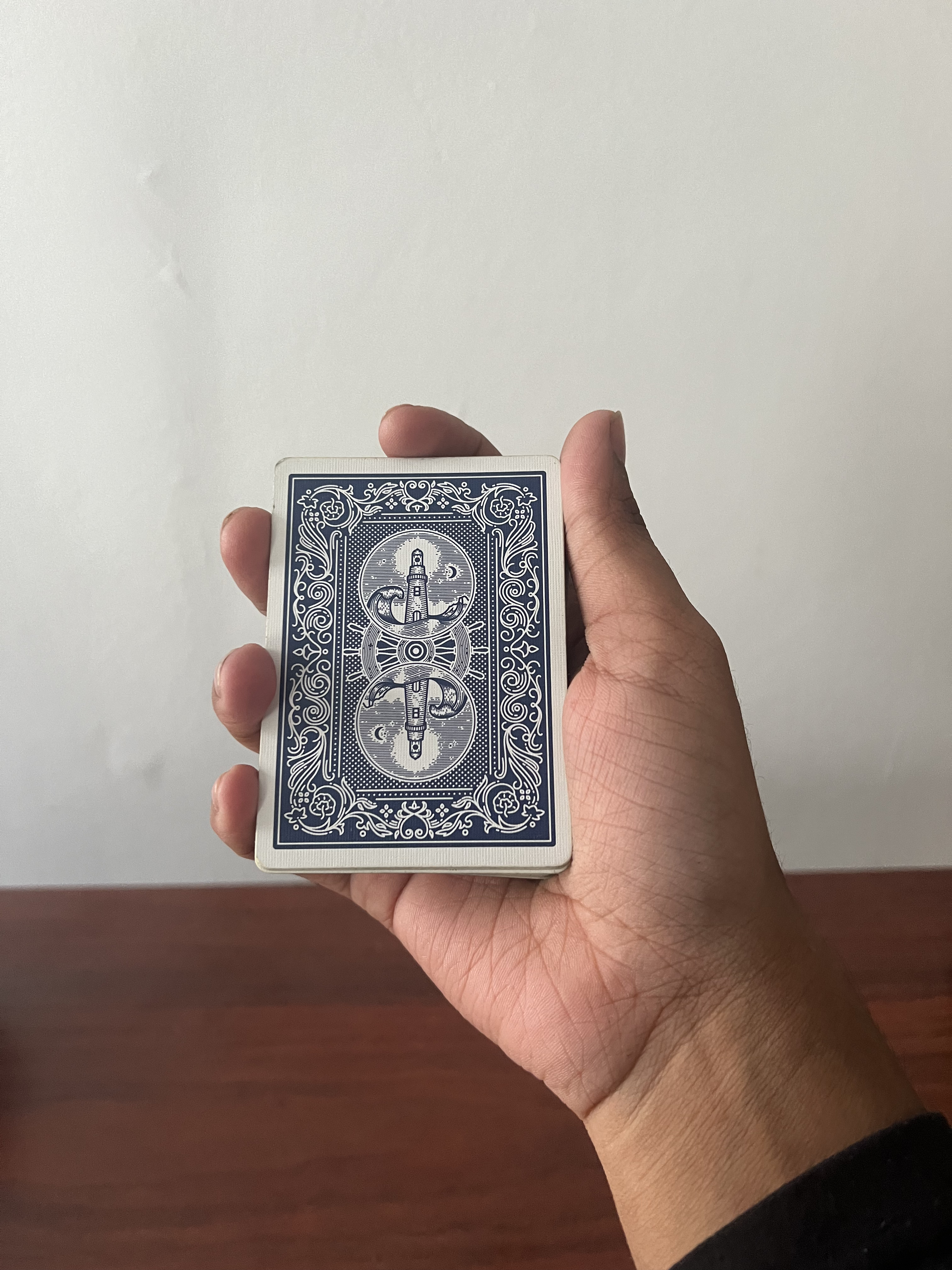
Mechanic's grip

In 2001 Sybil enthusiasts and twin brothers Dan and Dave Buck released Pasteboard Animations, another VHS tape explaining advanced cuts and flourishes. It sold hundreds of copies and was critically praised in a Genii magazine review that same year. In 2004, the twins released the instructional DVD The Dan and Dave System, which officially separated advanced card flourishing from magic. In 2007, Dan and Dave released The Trilogy, a three-disc DVD set. Retailing at $85 per unit, The Trilogy is the best-selling cardistry release of all time, having sold more than 25,000 copies. Virtually every cardist mentions either the System or The Trilogy as the source of their inspiration.

The term "cardistry" was first presented and popularized for this art form by "Richard Z." on the decknique.net forums in March 2006. Until then, these tricks were known by other names such as card flourishes, card manipulation, card stunts, and xtreme card manipulation.

== Types of cardistry moves ==
=== Grips ===
Styles of grips include:

- Biddle grip: Biddle grip is when a deck is stationary on a table and is lifted by taking the thumb and middle and pointer fingers to apply pressure to either side of the deck, and lifting the deck into air.
- Mechanic's grip (dealer's grip): Mechanic's grip is a grip where the deck of cards is placed in the center of the palm of the individual's chosen hand. This grip is also commonly known as dealer's grip.
- Straddle grip: The straddle grip is a variation of the Mechanic's grip with a couple of key differences. In the straddle grip the pinkie finger moves from the right edge to the bottom of the deck, and the thumb points upwards (instead of resting flat as in the mechanic's grip). The deck rests on the distal or intermediate phalanges, creating more space between the deck and the palm, thus the deck is lifted slightly.

=== One-handed cuts ===
These moves require only one hand to perform. The Charlier cut is the most familiar one-handed cut; other famous one-handed cuts include Jerry Cestkowski's L-cuts, the revolution cut, and Nikolaj Pedersen's trigger and its variations.

Charlier cut: This is the classic one-handed cut, where the individual must hold their deck in straddle grip, then release pressure on their thumb to drop half a packet of cards, and follow up by using the ring finger to push the bottom packet through and complete the cut.

Revolution cut: This cut builds on top of the Charlier cut, with a small variation added to it. After the individual uses their ring finger to push the packet of cards to clear the top half of the deck, instead of dropping the packet, the ring, middle and index fingers are used to rotate the top packet 180 degrees and then finish the cut.

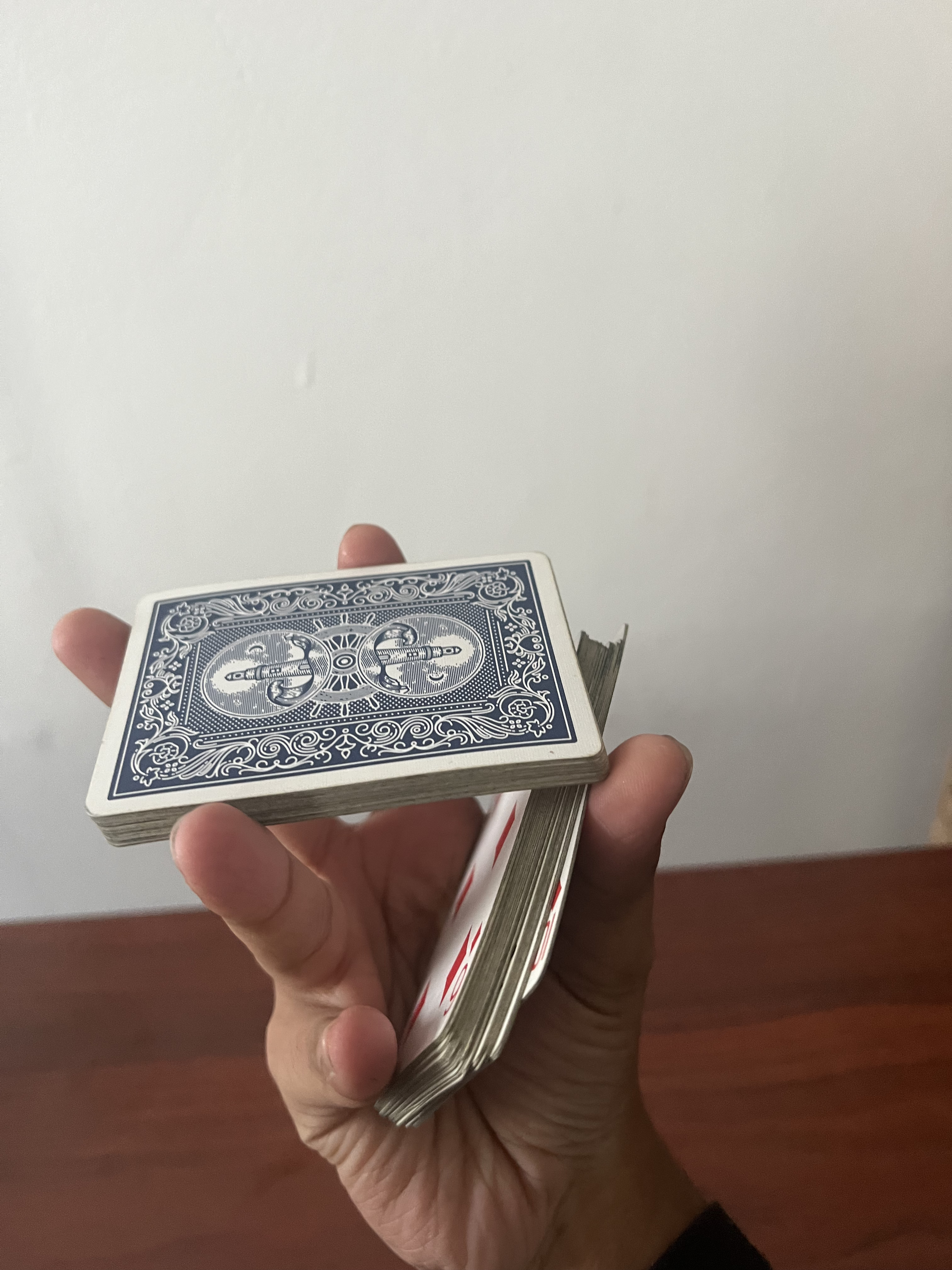
Revolution cut

Scissor cut: This is a cut that begins with the deck in straddle grip, with the thumb peeling off a packet of cards by lifting the thumb on the bottom edge of the deck. After this step, the thumb rotates the cards off the pointer finger until the top packet of cards clears the bottom packet. At this point the thumb brings back the (now) bottom packet back in to complete the cut.

=== Two-handed cuts ===
These moves are performed using both hands to grip/hold packets of cards; they often utilize one-handed cuts as a part of the move. These represent the bulk of all cardistry moves, ranging from beginner moves like the "Five Faces of Sybil", to highly complex and difficult cuts that require months to master. Dan and Dave greatly popularized this category with cuts like 'Pandora'. Other cardists like Daren Yeow, Oliver Sogard, Nikolaj Pedersen, Tobias Levin, Patrick Varnavas, Brian Tudor, and Noel Heath have greatly influenced and reformed two-handed cuts.

Swing cut: This is a flourish where the deck should be held in biddle grip in the dominant hand to start, followed by using the index finger to lift a small packet of cards. The index finger is then extended outwards, the card packet pivoted on the thumb, and the packet dropped onto the other hand. This process should be repeated until the deck is transferred from the dominant hand to the non-dominant hand.

Swivel cut: This is a cut that starts out in biddle grip, where the individual's second hand comes in from behind. and with the thumb finger, a small packet of cards is lifted from the thumb sided edge of the deck, pivoted around the index finger and dropped in the center palm of the second hand.

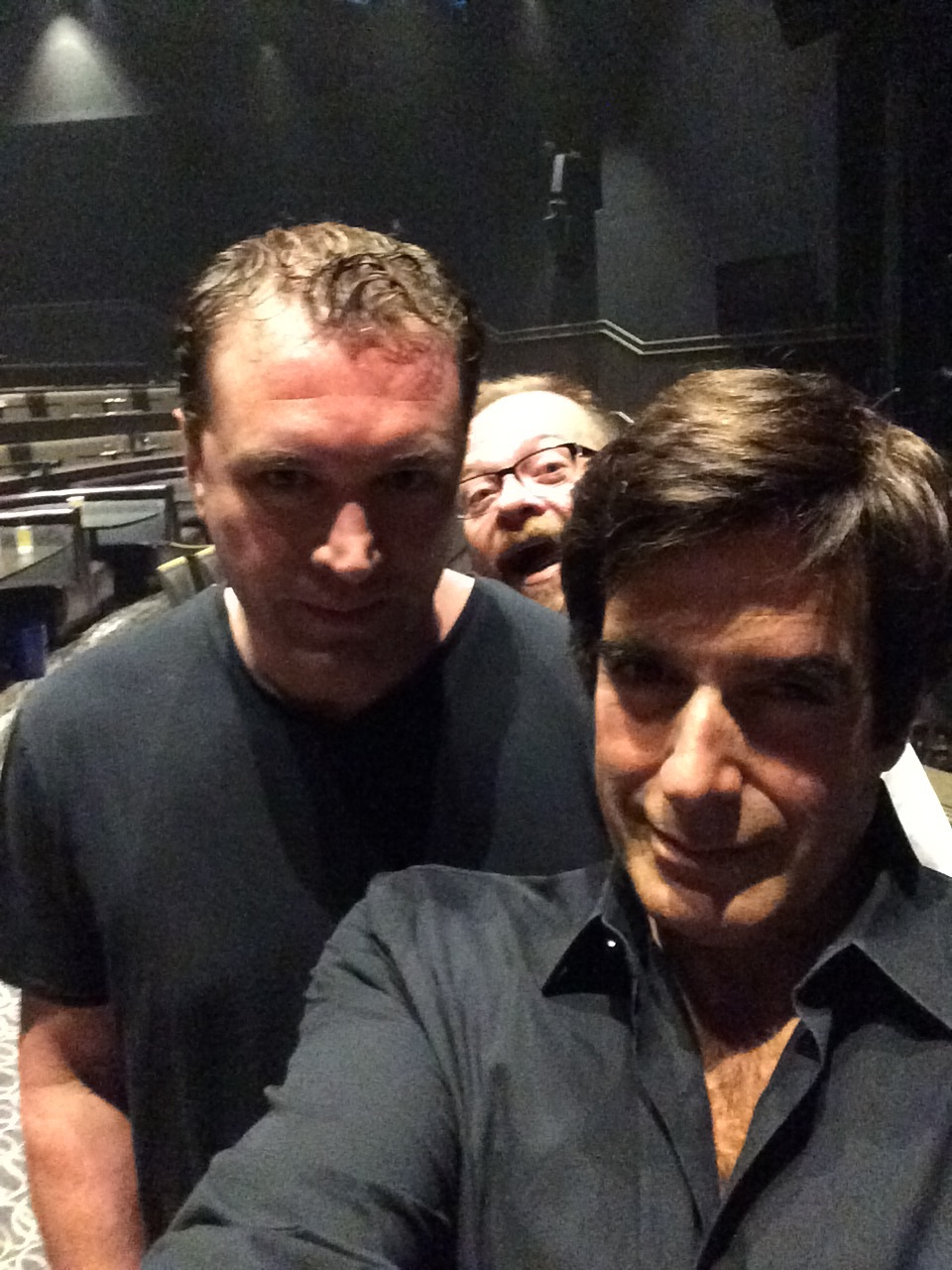
David Copperfield poses with his Cardistry collaborators Chris Kenner and Brian Tudor, 2015 MGM David Copperfield Theater

Sybil cut: This is a flourish which raises the stakes and requires an immense amount of practice. The cut begins with the deck in Z grip, after which the top packet of the Z grip is split into two packets, after which the bottom packet of Z grip is dropped onto the palm of the hand, while the second hand moves forward in a downward direction (making the side of the card packets parallel with the ground), then the top packets are rotated towards the bottom packet. The open second hand grabs the packet of cards for a moment before the first hand grabs a small packet of cards from the cleared packet and displays the packets.

=== Displays ===
These moves are either done in a two-dimensional or three-dimensional manner. Types of displays may include 3-D structures; ex: a card house, or a 3-D aspect; ex: Zach Mueller's "bloom," or 2-D displays that showcase repeating motifs or a symmetrical shape; ex: Dave Buck's "The Werm."

Ribbon spread (with turnover): This begins with the deck having a bevel towards the individual and held in biddle grip. The index finger is then taken to spread the deck onto a high friction (card mat) flat surface. With the cards spread out in front, the individual grabs one end of the deck, lifts it and places their pointer finger on top and trace across the whole deck to see each individual card turnover.

Five faces of Sybil: This is a flourish that is more advanced and will take rigorous practice to get right. The deck is held in Z grip on the left hand to start, with the top packet of the Z grip being split into two with the index finger, followed by the right wrist rotating downwards with the top two packet of cards while holding the third packet between the thumb and index finger. After rotating downward enough, the middle packet of Z grip is taken by the left hand with the thumb and middle finger. And lastly the right hand thumb and middle finger break off a small part of the middle packet, to display the five faces of sybil.

The Werm: This cardistry move begins by holding the deck in Z grip, and pivoting the three packets of cards on the pointer and thumb finger to face the ground, with the cards making a reverse U shape, then using the index and middle finger rotate a card from the top packet to touch the packet in front, forming a square shape. Lastly, take the thumb to pull a card from the top packet and let the friction between the pinky finger and the second thumb hold the card in place - and ending with the reveal of 5 packets of cards in a lengthwise display.

=== Fans and spreads ===
These moves involve spreading a deck of cards in various ways, typically in a circle. The 'index/thumb fan' is the most fundamental move in this category; other common moves in this category include the 'riffle fan' by Dimitri Arleri, the 'LePaul spread', and the 'pressure fan'.

=== Aerials ===
These moves involve cards (or packets of cards) continuously moving in a same direction, typically being caught by the other hand. Some of the most famous moves in this category include the 'Spring' and the 'Anaconda Dribble'. Aerials are moves that are completely independent and cannot be blended with other flourishes.

=== Isolations and twirls ===
These moves are mostly done with only a small number of cards. The performer usually fixes the card's center and rotates the card without changing its position. Belonging in this category are 'palm shift isolations', which were showcased by Jaspas Deck in his 2010 video Starry Eyed. Duy and Zach invented many unusual ways to do isolation.

== Cardistry-Con ==
Cardistry-Con is an interactive conference centered around the art of cardistry, where cardists from all over the world can gather and explore the potential of an ordinary deck of playing cards. The event aims to promote cardistry, including interviews, panel discussions, live performances, exclusive video screenings, workshops, contests and giveaways.

One of the highlights of the annual event is the Cardistry-Con Awards, which includes categories for deck design as well as technical achievement.

The "beta" Cardistry-Con occurred in 2014 as a subsection of Dan & Dave's Magic Con. In 2015, Magic Con was discontinued and an official Cardistry Con took its place. Since then, Cardistry-Con has been held in Brooklyn (2015), Berlin (2016), Los Angeles (2017), Hong Kong (2018), and Portland (2019). The next Cardistry-Con was originally scheduled for mid-2020 in Brussels, Belgium, but was postponed as a result of the coronavirus pandemic.

== See also ==
- Close-up magic
