= Ramo Samee =

Indian juggler

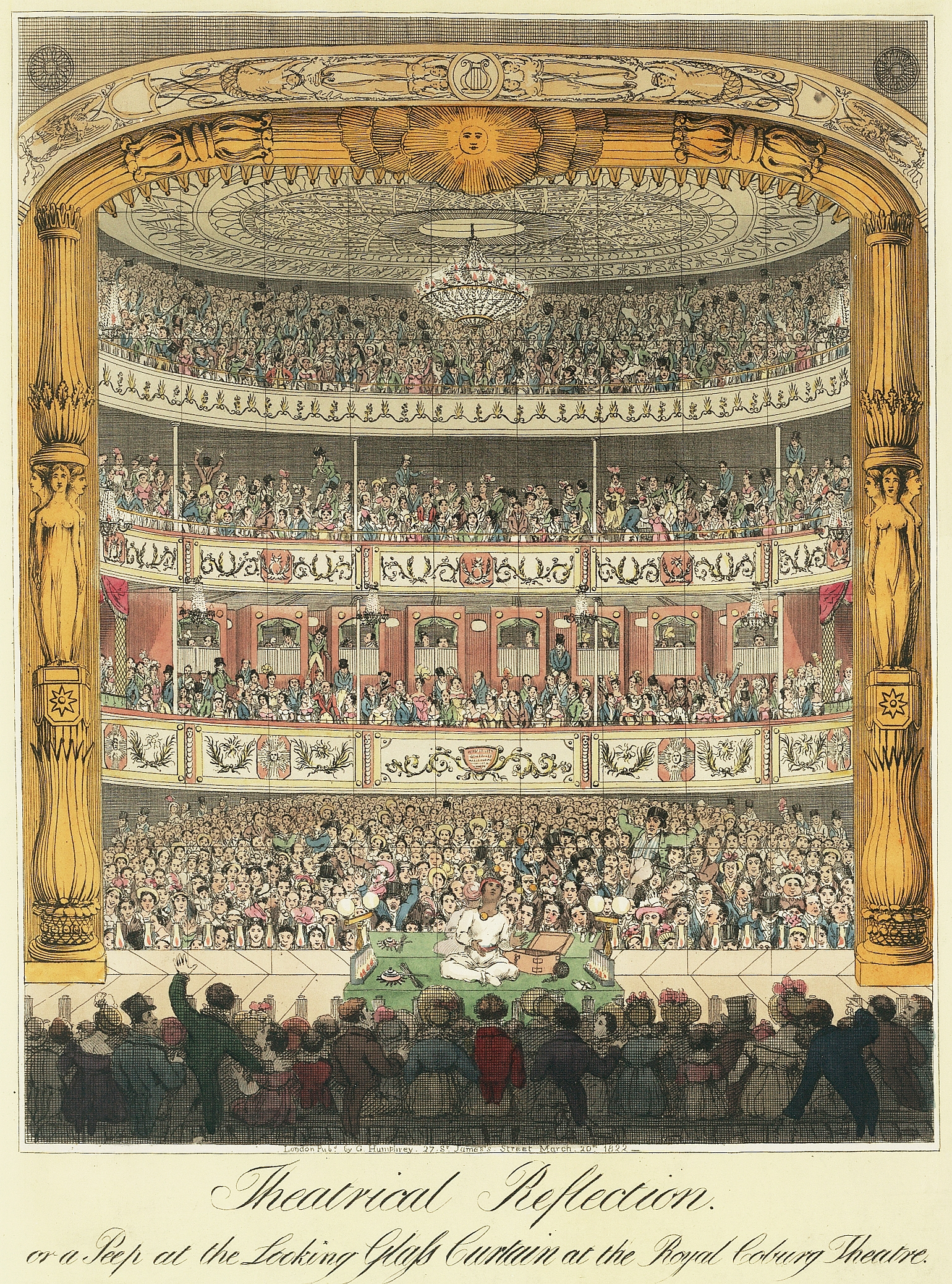
- 'Theatrical Reflection', A depiction of Ramo Samee juggling at the Royal Coburg Theatre in 1822.
- Born: East India Company
- Died: August 21, 1850; London
- Other names: The Indian Juggler, Sena Sama, Ramaswamy
- Occupation: Juggler

Ramo Samee was an Indian juggler, sword swallower, and magician, who performed throughout Europe in the 1800s. He is considered by some to be the first modern professional juggler.

== Career ==
Samee traveled to England between 1809 and 1814 where he gained recognition as a juggler and for his sword swallowing skills. Samee toured the United States from 1817 to 1819, performing in New York City and Boston. In 1822, Ramo was the "chief attraction" at the Royal Gardens Vauxhall Theatre in Kensington, where he was noted for his sword swallowing. He was a frequent performer at the Royal Coburg Theatre (now the Old Vic Theatre), where an image of him titled "Theatrical Reflection" still hangs backstage to this day. He performed until the 1840's.

One of Samee's tricks involved swallowing a handful of beads and a string, and then pulling the beads, now tied to the string, out of his mouth.

Samee was the inspiration for essayist William Hazlitt's essay 'The Indian Jugglers', in which Hazlitt describes how impressed he was by the performance, saying:

"To catch four balls in succession in less than a second of time, and deliver them back so as to return with seeming consciousness to the hand again, to make them revolve round him at certain intervals, like the planets in their spheres, to make them chase one another like sparkles of fire, or shoot up like flowers or meteors, to throw them behind his back and twine them round his neck like ribbons or like serpents, to do what appears an impossibility, and to do it with all the ease, the grace, the carelessness imaginable...there is something in all this which he who does not admire may be quite sure he never really admired any thing in the whole course of his life"

== Personal life ==
Samee was married to Helen Samee. They had at least one child.

Ramo died August 21, 1850 in London, England. Although Ramo had notoriety and money during his performing career, he died poor. His wife advertised for financial assistance to help with his burial.
