= Conjuring Arts Research Center =

The Conjuring Arts Research Center is a not-for-profit organization founded in 2003. The organization is based in Manhattan, New York City and is dedicated to the preservation and interpretation of magic and similar arts. The center is largely self-funded but they rely on donations, commissions for custom card decks, and subscription fees to help raise money. They maintain a library of books, posters, and other texts related to magic and other similar things, with texts from as far back as the 1500s. The center is not open to the public and requires an appointment to visit.
