= List of card manipulation techniques =

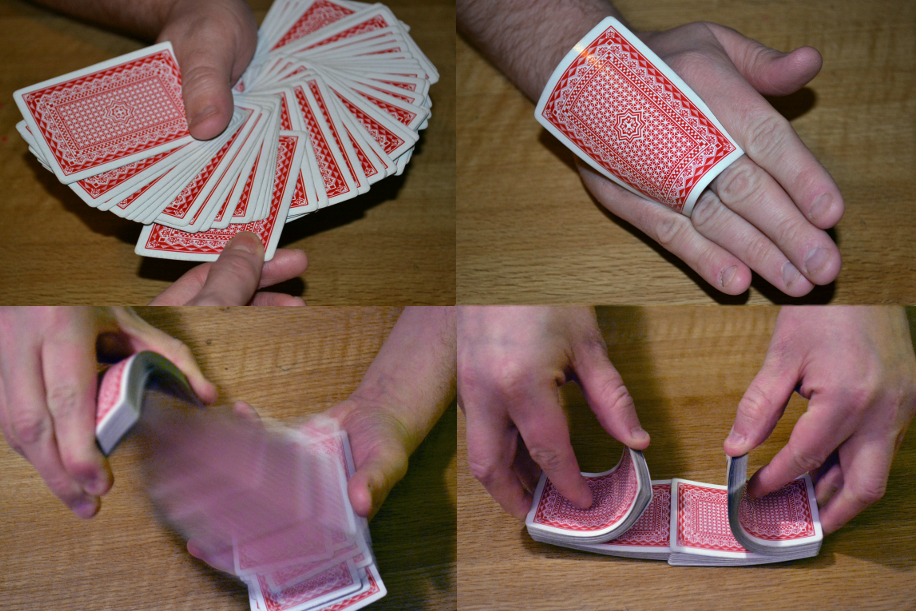
Card trick. Upper left: "Pick a card, any card". Upper right: Palming a card. Bottom left: A "spring" flourish. Bottom right: Mixing the cards allows for card trick preparation.

Card manipulation is the branch of magical illusion that deals with creating effects using sleight of hand techniques involving playing cards. Card manipulation is often used to perform card tricks in magical performances, especially in close-up, parlor, and street magic. A person who practices card manipulation may be called a card sharp, card shark, or card mechanic.

== Card manipulation techniques ==
- Dealing
  - Bottom dealing
  - Second dealing
- Shuffling
  - Faro shuffle
- False shuffling
  - Zarrow shuffle
- Palming
  - Back palm
  - Gambler's palm
  - Magician's palm
  - Tenkai palm
- Other techniques
  - Card marking
  - Double lift
  - Classic pass
  - Herrmann pass
  - Mechanic's grip
  - Si Stebbins stack
  - Trick decks

== Named card tricks ==
- ACAAN
- The Acme of Control
- Ambitious Card
- Blackstone's Card Trick Without Cards
- The Circus Card Trick
- The Four Burglars
- Out of This World
- Spelling Bee
- Twenty-One Card Trick

== Other related concepts ==
- Card throwing
- Cardistry
