= Roy Benson =

- Born: Edward Emerson Ford McQuaid; 17 January 1914; Courbevoie, Seine, France
- Died: 6 December 1977 (aged 63); Forest Hills, New York USA
- Occupation: Magician
- Parent(s): Dora Ford; Edward Emerson McQuaid

Roy Benson (17 January 1914 – 6 December 1977) was a stage magician born in Courbevoie in France. He was an accomplished musician. He is credited for Special Effects, having created the monster for the film The Flesh Eaters (1964) directed by his first cousin, Jack Curtis. He died of emphysema.

== Magic career ==
He studied with Nate Leipzig, creating the bell and bowl routine and elaborating the Chinese Sticks routine which is published in "Benson by Starlight". This also describes Benson's Bizarre Bag (an egg bag variant), The Dice Box, Bell and Bowl (rice bowls), The Wines of Beelzebub and Hydrostatic Cravis (where a drinking glass is inverted without the contents spilling).

Benson performed with his wife, Connie, who was a dancer and contortionist.

A photograph of Benson, signed and dedicated "To Dai [Vernon], Jeanne, Neepie in admiration and affection, Roy. 1946." was auctioned in January 2010.

== Publications ==
- Benson by Starlight. Published by Miracle Factory 2006 (Levent, Todd Carr). ISBN 0-9710405-4-0. ISBN 978-0-9710405-4-0)
- The Second Oldest Profession (republished within "Starlight")
- Benson on Magic (republished within "Starlight")

== Chinese Sticks ==
(Also called Mora Wands after Silent Mora - Louis McCord). The method for the Chinese Sticks as well as a number of routines by magicians including Howard Hale, Aldo Colomini, Pete Biro, Joe Stevens and Charlie Miller is presented in the DVD "Chinese Sticks" published by Greater Magic Video Library.

Benson elaborated his Chinese Sticks in "Starlight" on The Pillars of Soloman and the Magic Bradawl, published in Hoffman's Modern Magic.

== Benson Bowl ==
The Benson Bowl is a Cups and Ball routine popularised by Benson. The method and routine is published in "Starlight" and "Classic Secrets of Magic" by Bruce Elliott. The routine is included in the DVDs "Pat Page Spongeballs", "WGM Spongeballs", "John Mendoza Vol 2", "Steve Dacri Volume 3".
