= Tony Slydini =

Italian-born magician (1900–1991)

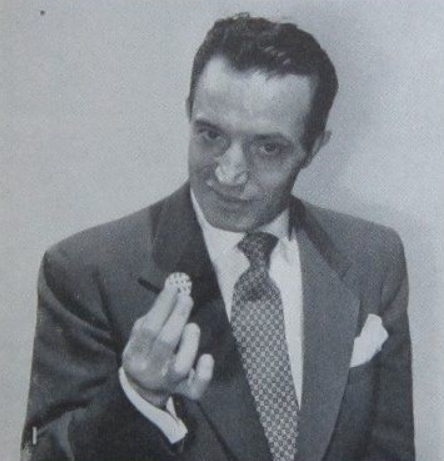
- Slydini in a 1951 publication
- Born: Quintino Marucci; September 1, 1900; Foggia, Italy
- Died: January 15, 1991 (aged 90); Orange, New Jersey, United States
- Resting place: Argentinian
- Occupation: Magician
- Known for: Originality, Skill, and Misdirection

Tony Slydini (September 1, 1900, Foggia, Italy – January 15, 1991), known as Slydini, was a magician known for close-up artistry magic. His public performances and lectures to other magicians inspired Doug Henning, Dick Cavett, Bill Bixby, Ricky Jay, and David Copperfield. He also produced books, films and publications on magic. He received the Masters Fellowship Award and Performing Fellowship Award from the Academy of Magical Arts. During his lifetime Slydini was inducted into the Society of American Magicians Hall of Fame as a Living Legend.

== Early life ==
Tony Slydini was born as Quintino Marucci in Foggia, Italy. He was the son of an amateur magician, who encouraged him to pursue sleight of hand at an early age. While still young, Slydini and his uncle left Italy to live in Buenos Aires, Argentina. It was there that he began to experiment more seriously with magic. He had no access to books on magic, nor personal instruction or magical performing apparatus of any kind. Without help or guidance, he reinvented much of the popular magic of the time, along with developing many new effects and illusions.

Early on, Slydini was attracted to the psychological aspects of his art, which would continually show itself in his magic in the form of precise and expert use of timing and misdirection. He was inspired by the relationship between a magician and his audience, which fueled his desire to be a close-up artist who would work intimately with the spectators. He became so good at it that he continually fooled the magicians for whom he performed, so much so that the famous dean of magicians, Dai Vernon, once remarked, "Slydini is the only magician who could ever fool me."

As a young man, Slydini had worked in South America's version of vaudeville for a time. But soon, the Great Depression struck that continent and work became scarce. In 1930, he moved to New York City, finding a job in at Hubert's Dime museum on 42nd Street. The Dime museum was designed as a center for entertainment for the working class, and in New York City, where many immigrants settled, they provided popular and inexpensive entertainment. Hubert's provided the young magician with a grand platform, on which he could experiment and continue to enhance and develop his already sharpened skills. From there, Slydini found work in carnivals and sideshows throughout the country. He was entertaining everyday workers and their families, but gaining valuable experience, knowledge and psychological expertise, while traveling and meeting people from coast to coast.

=== Name change and move to New York ===
In 1935, while Slydini was playing a museum in Paterson, New Jersey, the manager billed him as "Tony Foolem", in the absence of any better suggestion by Marucci (as Slydini was still known). The other acts on the bill became friendly with the magician and told him that they thought the name Tony Foolem was a poor choice and between them, they worked out the "Tony Slydini" stage name – the "sly" for being slick, and the "Dini" to follow the vogue for having something akin to the well known name of the successful Houdini. Tony was a shortened name for his given name Quintino and so, thus was "Tony Slydini" born.

== Career ==
On a visit to his sister in Boston during the 1930s, Slydini attracted the attention of an agent, landing a job for $15 a day for a three-day-a-week show. The agent recognized his skills and flawless sleight of hand which he performed with playing cards, coins and two ordinary white silks. Slydini was an expert in timing and misdirection and it showed. Unlike the performing magicians of the time, it was audience reactions that guided his performances. He remained in Boston for nearly seven years before moving back to New York. It was there, in 1947, that Slydini opened his magic studio located at 341 West 45th Street. Magicians from around the world came to that location for more than fifty years seeking instruction and guidance.

=== Traveling years ===
Slydini continued to gain popularity through his public performances, including many private club and party dates, and would travel the United States from New York to California, playing scattered engagements in museums, carnivals, side shows, etc., while remaining practically unknown to the world of magicians. It was finally through magician Herman Hanson, a close associate of Howard Thurston, that Slydini was brought before the local magic fans, eventually going on their public shows and more, in New York, Boston and Hartford. From there, he was quickly grabbed to appear on the well known Barbizon Plaza show in New York City where he made an instant hit with his different style of magic. His fame spread and soon other well-known magicians from around the world sought out his company and expertise including the legendary Cardini, Dai Vernon, Okito, The Great Virgil, Bert Allerton, Al Flosso and Jack Gwynne. Eventually, he appeared in Atlantic City before a national conclave of magicians and from there, his reputation as a "Magician’s Magician" was cemented.

Throughout the war, Slydini entertained thousands of soldiers in camps, hospitals and recreation centers. Between 1949 and 1950, he toured the United States under the direction of Ralph W. Read, who booked him to give his famous "Lecture Demonstrations" before over 30 magical organizations. Private lessons were also given on this tour, and many club dates as well, in the large cities on the route. Along the way, the performances and demonstrations at magic gatherings captured even more attention from his fellow magicians. Eventually, Europe and Asia requested his presence and he complied. While there he performed publicly, made televised appearances and gave numerous lectures and private instruction to inquiring magicians wanting to learn his new form of close-up magic and misdirection. In 1958, he headlined the International Brotherhood of Magicians British Ring's magic convention. Frank Joglar, reporting for Jean Hugard’s Magic Monthly, wrote, "There is no doubt who was the star of the Convention. It was Slydini, whose close-up work, lecture and Gala Show act were in every detail flawless. Reports from up, down and around the British Isles praised the lecture Tony gave on the tour." Thereafter, Slydini would focus almost exclusively on teaching and lecturing, illustrating to others his original performing techniques and unique methods of misdirection.

=== Magic's teacher and the media ===
Slydini was largely unknown to the public but became a legend to those in the magic profession. He was constantly featured in the magic magazines and publications. The Linking Ring, a publication of the International Brotherhood of Magicians, highlighted him in their 1951 February issue. Talk show host Dick Cavett wrote about his first meeting with Slydini in a New York Times column, "Doug Henning said to me, 'Tony's doing a special demonstration for some magicians tomorrow night at Vesuvio restaurant. Come.' Tomorrow night finally came. For the magicians, sitting for nearly two hours at that table, sudden gasps and intakes of breath abounded. It was like seeing a man walk up a wall. Nothing prepared you for it. Right at the start, a solid, heavy silver dollar, held before my eyes, vanished into thinnest air. And by no method I knew of. Certainly no sleeves. The two hours flew too quickly."

Cavett and Slydini became friends and soon afterwards the talk show host featured the magician in a televised special, which was so well received that a second broadcast followed.

Slydini would go on to appear on The Tonight Show with Johnny Carson and other popular broadcast venues of his time, but this was not his forte. It had become teaching, training and an increased research and development of the art of misdirection. He was willing to teach and the magicians he served were willing to learn.

=== Seminars, publications, and the closing years ===
Slydini's influence spread across the magic spectrum such that by 1975, his fame led to a major event in the field of magic. Joe Stevens, of Stevens Magic Emporium, organized a gathering of magicians in Las Vegas in March 1978. The event, attended mostly by professional magicians was a first and it was called The Slydini Seminar. The annual event grew in popularity and size, becoming known as the Desert Magic Seminar and later the World Magic Summit. Tony Slydini presented three solid hours of shows and lectures, plus additional semi-private lessons available to the 90 magicians in attendance and began a tradition of educational offerings to magicians, expanding the number and nature of lectures with an emphasis on variety and versatility. Slydini attended and lectured at the event originally named for him until his health no longer permitted travel.

Over his lifetime, many books were written about Slydini, his sleight-of-hand techniques, the psychology behind his performance and his clever methods of misdirection. In 1976, Slydini wrote a personal authorization letter to all magic societies and associations in North America, sponsoring his protégé, Bill Wisch, to represent him and take his place introducing, demonstrating and marketing his long awaited, two-volume, book sets, The Best of Slydini and More and The Magical World of Slydini, both written by Karl Fulves. These two book sets are considered to be must-read standard classics in magical literature. Wisch lectured on Slydini's methods and techniques, as well as his own, to thousands of magicians in 74 cities across the United States and Canada in 1976 and 1978.

There were also films, videos and countless articles on his methods and philosophies. The scientific professions also took an interest and more than ten feature articles were written about his psychological methods for distraction and in particular, willful misdirection. Scientific American published a 2015 research article entitled "The Neuroscience of Slydini's Paper Balls-to-Hat Magic Trick".

The magician who taught himself continued to teach others well into his eighties.

== Death ==
Slydini died of heart failure on January 15, 1991, after several years in a New Jersey nursing home.

== Style ==
When performing, Slydini never enunciated a magic word, e.g. "abracadabra" or "hocus pocus". His subtle magical gestures made it clear that he knew something not known, and probably unknowable, to his audience. Audiences saw an elfin quality in him that was unlikely to be duplicated. He created an ambiguous persona which allowed one to believe that maybe he was an elf and that maybe he really did have magical powers. As a close-up performer, he was considered nonpareil by his peers. His almost casual manner of performing made the magical effects he offered those of true magic. His style of close-up was something that had never been seen before. He was one of the first to show close-up magic as an art in itself, rather than as a lead-in to bigger and grander illusions. Slydini's magic was impromptu and rather than follow a set sequence of tricks as most magicians did, he allowed his audience and the situation to dictate his show.

== Awards and honors ==
Over his lifetime, Slydini received countless awards and honors from around the world including the Masters Fellowship from the Academy of Magical Arts in 1974. The Society of American Magicians made him a Hall of Fame – Living Legend inductee. He also was awarded the Academy of Magical Arts’ Performing Fellowship. In 1952, he became the recipient of the first Star of Magic award given by New York's Magic Ring and was an inducted member of the International Brotherhood of Magicians’ Order of Merlin.

== Publications, video and film ==
- The Stars of Magic by Lou Tannen
- As I Recall by Tony Slydini (DVD Set)
- The Magic of Slydini by Lewis Ganson
- Annotated Magic of Slydini by Lewis Ganson and Tony Slydini
- The Best of Slydini (books 1 and 2) by Karl Fulves
- The Magical World of Slydini (books 1 and 2) by Karl Fulves
- The Magic of Slydini by Lewis Ganson
- The Annotated Magic of Slydini by Gene Matsuura, 2011
- The Best of Slydini and More by Lou Tannen
- Magician Mentors and Inspirations by Ricky Jay (American Masters PBS series)
- "Bill Wisch Talks About Slydini and More" (podcast)

== Legacy ==
In writing of Slydini's life, magician-author Karl Fulves remarked, "There is no question that Slydini is the most influential figure in Close-Up Magic in the 20th Century. His theories and concepts, his ingenious use of psychology and misdirection, combine to produce natural magic of the highest order. To see him work is to see the nearest thing yet, to real magic." "That sentiment," said former television talk show host Dick Cavett, "is the one most commonly expressed by anyone having the opportunity to actually see this great magician perform."

Slydini was known for his showmanship, misdirection and close-up magic, and influenced many subsequent magicians.He is considered by many magicians to be one of the two finest 20th-century performers, teachers, lecturers and creators of artistic sleight-of-hand magic; Dai Vernon is the other.
