= The War Against the Assholes =

2015 science fiction and fantasy novel

- First edition
- Author: Sam Munson
- Language: English
- Publisher: Saga Press
- Publication date: 2015
- Publication place: United States
- Media type: Print
- Pages: 272
- ISBN: 9781481427746

The War Against the Assholes is a 2015 science fiction and fantasy novel, by the author Sam Munson. Munson also penned The November Criminals, the novel whose 2016 film adaptation starred Ansel Elgort and Chloë Grace Moretz.

== Summary ==
Mike Wood, a mediocre Catholic school student in Manhattan, gets drawn into a war between rival factions of magicians by his enigmatic classmate Hob.

== Inspiration ==
The inspiration behind The War Against the Assholes stems from a vademecum written by the elusive S.W. Erdnase, the author behind The Expert at the Card Table. While loyal fans have traced the book's publication to Chicago in 1902, the details behind the story are shrouded in mystery. Furthermore, similar to William Shakespeare, Erdnase's identity is heavily debated to this day.

== Reception and reviews ==
The Library Journal calls the novel “an imaginative, choppily constructed fantasy/mystery” while the Barnes & Noble blog says it's for “fans of The Magicians, fans of distinctive characters, fans of well-used profanity—there’s a little something for everyone.” The Maggie Linton Show says The War Against the Assholes is “A really quirky and unique premise…Very visual, I couldn’t put it down. The unique quirkiness of The War Against the Assholes really captured me.”
