= Trick deck =

Altered decks of cards used by magicians

A trick deck is a deck of playing cards that has been altered in some way to allow magicians to perform certain card tricks where sleight of hand would be too difficult or impractical.

== Trick decks ==
=== Brainwave deck ===
The Brainwave deck is a lesser-known deck which is gaining in popularity, it operates on a principle similar to that of the Invisible Deck, but has vastly improved on it. With the cards still in their box, the magician asks a spectator to name a card. The magician pulls the deck out and fans the cards face down, then spreads through the deck until a single face-up card is discovered, which turns out to be the spectator's card. For the grand finale the magician explains that they actually knew ahead of time which card the spectator would select, rather than having secretly turned it over during the performance. They then proceed to prove this by turning the spectator's card over and revealing that the card in question features a different backing pattern than every other card in the deck, suggesting to the audience that the magician may possess powers of extrasensory perception.

An inverse handling of the Brainwave deck is the X Deck, originally invented by Jay Sankey and identical to the Invisible Deck, but with the odd cards having an X on them. Both decks are meant to convey the idea that the magician did not perform the intended effect through the use of sleight of hand.

=== Forcing decks ===
These decks are used to force a spectator to select a particular card, which the magician already knows in advance. Such a feat can be accomplished using a regular deck and sleight of hand but with the aid of a forcing deck the trick is made self-working.

One of the simplest forcing decks is the "one-way forcing deck", where all cards are identical (with the possible exception of one or two at the top and bottom of the deck). When using this deck, the magician must be careful to prevent the spectator from seeing the faces of the cards. The below-mentioned Svengali Deck can also be easily used as a force deck, by forcing the choice of one of the twenty-six identical short cards.

A variant of the one-way forcing deck is the Monte Cristo deck invented by Henry Hardin, more recently published under the name Mastermind Deck by Chris Kenworthey. All the cards are the identical force card, but misindexed on the top left corner, so that the cards all appear to be different when fanned or spread. Any card can be selected, and rotating the deck before revealing the selection will always reveal the force card.

It is worth noting that such decks have fallen out of favor amongst professional magicians because of an increased suspicion amongst audiences regarding the use of gimmick props. Thus, they are rarely employed.

=== Invisible deck ===
The invisible deck is one of the best known card tricks. Joe Berg created the Invisible Deck in the 1930s, originally calling it the Ultra Mental Deck. Often mistakenly credited to Dai Vernon, Don Alan or Eddie Fields, the most-used presentation of an "invisible" deck of cards was invented by J.B. Bobo.

The trick's title stems from the classic presentation of this effect, in which the magician hands the spectator an imaginary, or "invisible" deck. On being handed the deck, the spectator is asked to mime the acts of removing the cards from their case, shuffling them, spreading them face-up on the table, freely selecting a card, replacing it face-down among the other face-up cards, and returning the deck to its box.

At this point, either the spectator keeps the imaginary deck while the magician removes the real deck from their pocket, or the spectator hands the imaginary deck to the magician, which suddenly becomes real in the magician's hands. Michael Close also uses a handling in which the invisible deck is tossed back into a paper bag, whereupon it becomes real and visible. The magician then asks the spectator to name the card they selected, removes the deck, face-up, from its box and spreads the cards to show one face-down card. The spectator removes the card to find it is the one they named moments earlier.

In the more comedic version of the routine, more focus will be drawn to the part of the effect where the spectator is handling the cards. Often, the magician might criticize the spectator's card-handling abilities, or remind them to take the cards out of the case before trying to shuffle them.

A more serious routine can be performed, which focuses more on the magician's mindreading abilities and the fact that the spectator had a completely free choice of card. The magician could hand the spectator a box of cards to hold, ask them to think of, and concentrate on, any card in the deck, and then to name it. The spectator then hands the box back to the magician and the trick completed as before.

The invisible deck is prepared by arranging a normal deck so that all the even cards face one way and the odd cards the other. Cards are then slightly glued or stuck together into even-odd pairs, face out. When the spectator names their card, the deck is extracted from the box with the chosen parity, even or odd, facing the magician. The magician then fans out the cards until they see the spectator's, which will be facing the magician. Applying a small amount of pressure, the card is split from its opposite member, revealing the back of the card for the spectator to see and choose.

The deck can be bought from magic dealers. It is also possible to construct the deck using a regular deck and additional materials from department stores.

=== Marked deck ===
A marked deck uses a marking system on the back of the cards to indicate their suit and value, so that a magician can identify a card without seeing its face. The two main methods used for creating a marked deck are reader systems, which hide the suit and value in the back design, or coded systems, where the suit and value is indicated by a code, e.g. a mark might be placed in a certain position to indicate the number of the card, with the color or shape of the mark indicating suit. Many marked decks are produced commercially, while some are created using card marking techniques similar to those used to cheat at gambling, e.g. by adding tiny punctures or dots. Some magicians may even mark a card during a performance, either with a sharpened finger nail or a tool (often a ring known as a "poker ring") made specifically for that purpose.

=== Rising card deck ===
With a rising card deck, the spectator chooses a card and puts it back in the deck of cards. Then, the chosen card magically rises, whether it is in the box, in the hands, on a surface, or even in a wine glass.

The construction of these decks varies. The simplest of these, often described in amateur magic books, involves cutting a hole in the back of the carton so that the performer can surreptitiously push up the top card with their finger. More complex arrangements include a pair of cards gimmicked with an elastic band onto which the target card can be pushed (between the gimmicked pair), or a deck with a fine black thread passed across the top onto which the target card can be pressed down. There are without a doubt more complex and clever arrangements in use.

=== Stripper deck ===
A stripper deck (also known as a tapered deck, wizard deck, or biseauté deck) allows the magician to control the main location of a card or group of cards easily within the pack. Even after being shuffled into the deck by a spectator, the magician can cut to a selected card. Similarly, even after being lost in different parts of the deck, the magician can move multiple cards to specific locations using basic shuffles.

Unlike the invisible or svengali deck, the stripper deck can be handled by an audience member unfamiliar with the concept and can withstand a modest amount of scrutiny without exposing the secret; however, this deck is found in a number of beginners' magic kits, so the secret is well-known, even among non-magicians.

The cards of a stripper deck are slightly tapered, so that the sides no longer form a perfect rectangle. The change is slight enough to be undetected by visual inspection or even casual handling. However, if a single card is withdrawn and turned end-for-end before being reinserted, or if the remainder of the deck is thus turned, the broad end of the card can easily be detected by feel or sight at the narrow end of the deck. The magician can then control the card through sleight of hand.

Many of the effects achieved with a stripper deck can also be accomplished with sleight of hand.

=== Svengali deck ===
Operation of a Svengali deck Upper figure: Riffling the deck from front (top) to back (bottom) exposes the normal cards (black) Lower figure: Riffling the deck from back to front exposes the shorter cards (red)

The svengali, or long-and-short deck, alternates between normal cards and shortened cards, with the shortened cards all of the same rank and suit. When the deck is riffled front to back, only the normal cards are visible; when it is riffled back to front, only the shortened cards are visible. It was created by Burling Hull and marketed by WD LeRoy in 1909.

The deck can be dribbled or riffled to create the illusion that the deck is completely ordinary. It can even be shuffled. One basic trick involves a spectator choosing a card from the deck and returning it; the card can then appear practically anywhere in the deck, making tricks like the Ambitious Card incredibly simple. The final and most stunning trick is when all the cards are suddenly presented as being all the same as the initially chosen card.

Joe Stuthard's Trilby and Bi-Co Trilby Decks are variations on this deck. In the 1960s and 1970s, Marshall Brodien sold 17 million Svengali decks under the name TV Magic Cards.

While the Svengali Deck allows for the easy performance of seemingly complex tricks, the conjurer cannot allow an audience member to examine the deck. The use of a Svengali Deck can also be detected by its characteristic faster riffle and sound. Finally, because the deck is widely sold in joke and novelty shops, many laypeople are familiar with it.

Writing pads or books using the same principle have also been created, to force the spectator to choose the content of a seemingly random page.

== Non-standard decks ==
The following are not trick decks per se, but the cards they contain may be combined with a normal deck (or a packet of cards from a regular deck) in order to perform specific tricks.

=== Gaff deck ===
A gaff deck is a deck that contains cards used in conjunction with a normal deck. For the most part gaffed cards have the same back pattern as a standard deck of cards, but the faces are changed in various unique ways; for example, there may be two "3½ of clubs" cards, which might be used to split a 7 of clubs into two cards if called for. Gaff cards are sometimes included as bonus cards with a regular deck.

=== Blank deck ===
The cards in a blank deck have the same identical backs as in a standard deck, but the faces are entirely blank.

=== Double blank deck ===
All cards are completely blank on both sides.

=== Double faced deck ===
All cards have faces on both sides.

=== Double back deck ===
All cards have the standard backs on both sides.

== Standard deck setups ==
There are many ways to order a deck so that the magician can perform special tricks. It is possible to use a stack, or ordered deck, to determine what card the spectator cut to. A popular stack to use for this is a Si Stebbins stack. To make one, all a magician needs to do is order the cards so that each card is three values greater than the previous card, and so that the suits cycle consistently. For example: A♣, 4♥, 7♠, 10♦, K♣, 3♥, etc. The simplest way to use a Si Stebbins Stack is to let the spectator cut and replace the cards and look at the top card. They then replace the card on top and the magician takes the deck and peeks at the bottom card. Now, using the sequence of the Si Stebbins Stack, the magician adds three to the card value they peeked, and cycles one suit. Now they can continue the trick as usual. The Si Stebbins Stack also allows for more complex mind reading techniques using additional mathematical principles.

== See also ==
- Card marking
- One-way deck
