= Stewart Judah =

- Born: Joshua Stewart; February 16, 1893; Cincinnati, Ohio
- Died: June 11, 1966 (aged 73)
- Occupation: magician
- Known for: sleight of Hand, card magic

Stewart Judah (February 16, 1893 – June 11, 1966) began a career in magic in 1920. By 1938 he was selected as one of the 10 best living card magicians.

Named one of the "Card Stars" in Hilliard's Greater Magic and featured in Pallbearer's Review. He contributed effects to many magazines including Jinx, Phoenix, New Phoenix, Talisman and Linking Ring.

One of his marketed effects was the "Keys of Judah".

Each year, International Brotherhood of Magicians Ring 71 holds a yearly picnic combined with the local Society of American Magicians, featuring the time-honored John Braun/Stewart Judah contest.

== Published works ==
- Subtle Problems You Will Do (1937) with John Braun
- The Magic World of Stewart Judah (1966) edited by John Braun

== Tributes to Stewart Judah ==
- A Tribute To The Card Tricks Of Stewart Judah by Ryan Swigert (2007)

== See also ==
- List of magicians
