= Classic pass =

Sleight of hand move

The classic pass (also known as the classic shift) is considered to be an intermediate or advanced sleight of hand move, first published by Henri Descremp in his 1786 volume Testament de Jérôme Sharp. The book The Expert at the Card Table by S. W. Erdnase brought this move to many influential magicians, including Dai Vernon. Now, this move is now used by almost all professional magicians.

== How it works ==
The classic pass is one of many passes, all of which aim to invisibly cut a deck of cards. Unlike the Herrmann pass, this pass brings the top half of the deck below the bottom in one quick motion, covered by the hand holding the deck and the bottom half of the deck. When paired with misdirection, this move can successfully be used to invisibly cut a deck of cards.

== Uses ==
The classic pass is a strong foundation in card magic, used by many magicians as a method of secretly getting a card from the middle of the deck to the top. Along with being used as a card control, this move can be used as a false cut, either by undoing a visible cut, or to have a visible cut undo the pass. The classic pass can also be used as a way to visually change a playing card by doing it rapidly with the cards face up.

One common trick this move is used in is the ambitious card trick, a magic trick where the spectators selected card "magically" comes to the top of the deck in a seemingly impossible manner.

== Variations ==
There are multiple variations on the classic pass that change how the move is concealed, hidden, or how the move is misdirected.

- Jiggle pass - The classic pass gets hidden by a shake, or a jiggle, hence the name
- Dribble pass - The classic pass gets hidden by the magician dribbling cards (a way of dropping cards in a fashionable way)
- Riffle pass - The classic pass gets hidden by a riffle. This is the most common variation, often by magicians without realizing
- Cover pass - A more extreme variation of the classic pass. It is just like the classic pass, but the top card doesn't ever move, letting you do the move with less to no misdirection
