= Paul Currie =

Paul Currie may refer to:

- Paul Currie (director) (born 1968), Australian film director
- Paul Currie (footballer) (born 1985), Scottish footballer

== See also ==
- Paul Curry (magician) (1917–1986), businessman and amateur magician
- Paul Curry (golfer) (born 1961), English golfer
