= Mathemagician =

Mathematician and magician

A mathemagician is a mathematician who is also a magician. The term "mathemagic" is believed to have been introduced by Royal Vale Heath with his 1933 book "Mathemagic".

The name "mathemagician" was probably first applied to Martin Gardner, but has since been used to describe many mathematician/magicians, including Arthur T. Benjamin, Persi Diaconis, and Colm Mulcahy. Diaconis has suggested that the reason so many mathematicians are magicians is that "inventing a magic trick and inventing a theorem are very similar activities."

Mathemagician is a neologism, specifically a portmanteau, that combines mathematician and magician. A great number of self-working mentalism tricks rely on mathematical principles, such as Gilbreath's principle. Max Maven often utilized this type of magic in his performance.

The Mathemagician is the name of a character in the 1961 children's book The Phantom Tollbooth. He is the ruler of Digitopolis, the kingdom of mathematics.

== Notable mathemagicians ==
- Jin Akiyama
- Arthur T. Benjamin
- Persi Diaconis
- Alex Elmsley
- Richard Feynman
- Karl Fulves
- Martin Gardner
- Norman Gilbreath
- Ronald Graham
- Vi Hart
- Royal Vale Heath
- Colm Mulcahy
- W. W. Rouse Ball
- Raymond Smullyan
