= Hugard's Magic Monthly =

Magazine (1943–1965)

- Cover of Vol VII reproduction
- Frequency: Monthly
- Founder: Jean Hugard
- First issue: June 1943
- Final issue Number: April 1965; 245
- Based in: New York City

Hugard's Magic Monthly was a magic periodical published June 1943 – April 1965. The magazine was created and edited by Jean Hugard until his death in 1959, when Fred Braue took over as editor. After Braue's death, the magazine continued to be published by Blanca López until its final issue, number 245. A significant portion of Martin Gardner's Encyclopedia of Impromptu Magic Tricks was originally published in Hugard's Magic Monthly.
