= One-way deck =

Playing card deck type

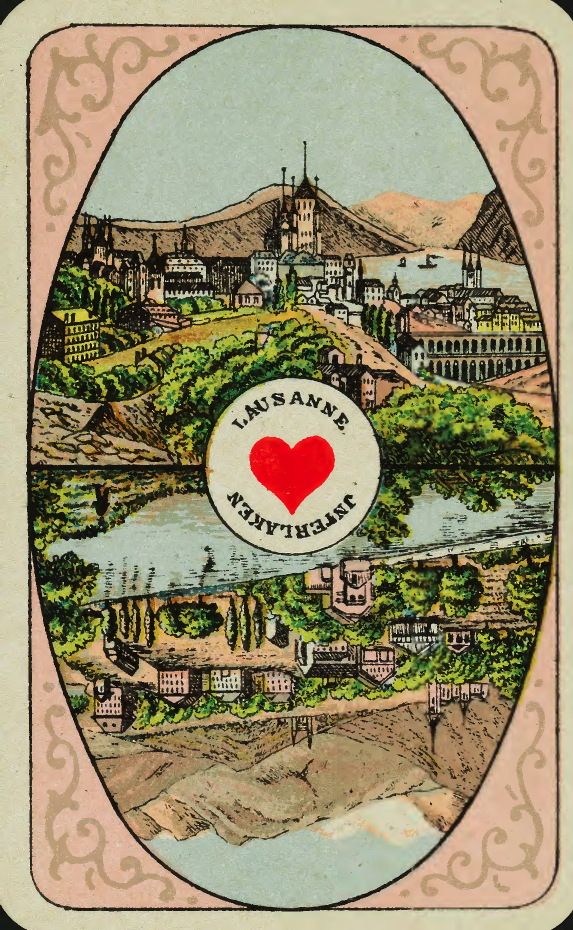
An example of a non-symmetrical playing card back design.

A one-way deck is a deck of playing cards where the back of the cards has a pattern that can be oriented to have a "top" and "bottom". Magicians and card sharps can use the orientations of cards in one-way decks to encode information that allows them to perform card tricks.

A certain number of the faces of playing cards are not symmetrical, and therefore can also be used as "pointer cards" (the seven of any suit, for instance, whose odd pip is off-center on most modern decks). When all aligned, these cards allow an otherwise ordinary deck (where the backs are all identical and symmetrical) to be used as a partial one-way deck.

== See also ==
- Trick deck
- Edge sorting
- Card marking
