= Royal Vale Heath =

Royal Vale Heath (5 January 1883 – 25 July 1960) was a wealthy New York stockbroker and writer who became widely known as a magician and puzzle enthusiast. His magic tricks were often based on mathematics and he introduced the term "mathemagic" to describe them in a 1933 book titled Mathemagic. He was a frequent contributor to Scripta Mathematica, Hugard's Magic Monthly, and The Jinx.

He specialized in tricks involving dice, serial numbers and magic squares. He once constructed a magic square that remained a magic square even when it was turned upside-down.

In 1988 his work was exhibited at the David Winton Bell Gallery at Brown University.

Heath played a crucial role in the career of popular mathematics writer Martin Gardner. At a magic show in 1956 he introduced Gardner to flexagons and these folded paper shapes became the subject of Gardner's December 1956 column in Scientific American which launched his quarter century tenure there. Several of Heath's tricks have been collected in Gardner book Mathematics, Magic and Mystery.
