= Crimping =

Crimping may refer to:

- a synonym for Shanghaiing, kidnapping men to serve as sailors
- Hair crimping, a method of styling straight hair
- Grain crimping, an organic way to preserve feed grain

== See also ==
- Crimping pliers, tools for squeezing things together
- Crimp (disambiguation)
