= The Acme of Control =

Magic card trick

The Acme of Control is a card trick in which the magician shows two cards, inserts them into the deck, allows the spectator to shuffle the deck, takes the deck back, and is then able to produce the two cards in any way he pleases, such as from his pocket.

== Method ==
Assuming that the magician wishes to produce the cards from his pocket at the end, he starts with the five of diamonds and the four of hearts in his pocket before presenting the trick. He then removes the five of hearts and the four of diamonds that are in the deck, and shows them together to the audience. These cards are re-inserted into the deck, which is then shuffled by the spectator. At the end, the magician produces the similar pair of cards that have been in his pocket all along, apparently the same cards which were shuffled into the deck.

== Sources ==
- Erdnase, S. W. The Expert At The Card Table. ISBN 0-486-28597-9
