= Paul Curry =

Paul Curry may refer to:

- Paul Curry (magician) magician and businessman
- Paul Curry (golfer) professional golfer
