= Crimp =

Crimp may refer to:

- Crimp (climbing), a small hold with little surface area
- Crimp (electrical), a type of solderless connection
- Crimp (gambling), a bent corner of a card to facilitate cheating
- Crimp (joining), a deformity in metal or food dough used to make a joint
- Crimp (wool), the number of bends per unit of length
- A style of song in the British comedy series The Mighty Boosh
- Crimp, Cornwall, a hamlet in England, United Kingdom
- Douglas Crimp (1944-2019), American writer, curator, and art historian
- Martin Crimp (born 1956), British playwright

== See also ==
- Crimping (disambiguation)
- Staple remover, also known as a "crimper"
