= ACAAN =

ACAAN is currently one of the most performed card tricks. It is an acronym that stands for Any Card At Any Number, describing the effect of the trick. In this trick, a spectator's card is found at the position of the deck that they name. There are many variations that change different aspects of the trick. One of those variations is the CAAN trick (Card At Any Number), where one card, decided by the magician, is found at any named position.

== History ==
The first known person to publish an ACAAN was Louis Nikola in the book Thought Anticipated in 1927. Slowly, this trick developed over time, but the largest contribution was from David Berglas. He started working on the ACAAN sometime in the 1940s, and since then, his version has become known as the "Holy Grail" of card tricks. Now, just about every magician has at least one ACAAN variation in their repertoire, and almost every magic store has countless ACAAN products.

== Criteria ==
David Berglas' ACAAN was seemingly impossible to most people, even magicians. People have spent years trying to figure out a method that acts like Berglas' trick. Magicians have developed four requirements for something to be considered a "perfect" ACAAN, though no trick has been known to meet all four requirements:

- the deck of cards must be in view before the trick even starts
- a spectator must be given a completely free choice on what card is selected. No forces or stooges may be used
- a different spectator must be given a completely free choice on what number is selected. Once again, no forces or stooges may be used
- another spectator must be the one to deal the cards. The magician is not allowed to touch the deck at any point
