= Bruce Cervon =

American magician (1941–2007)

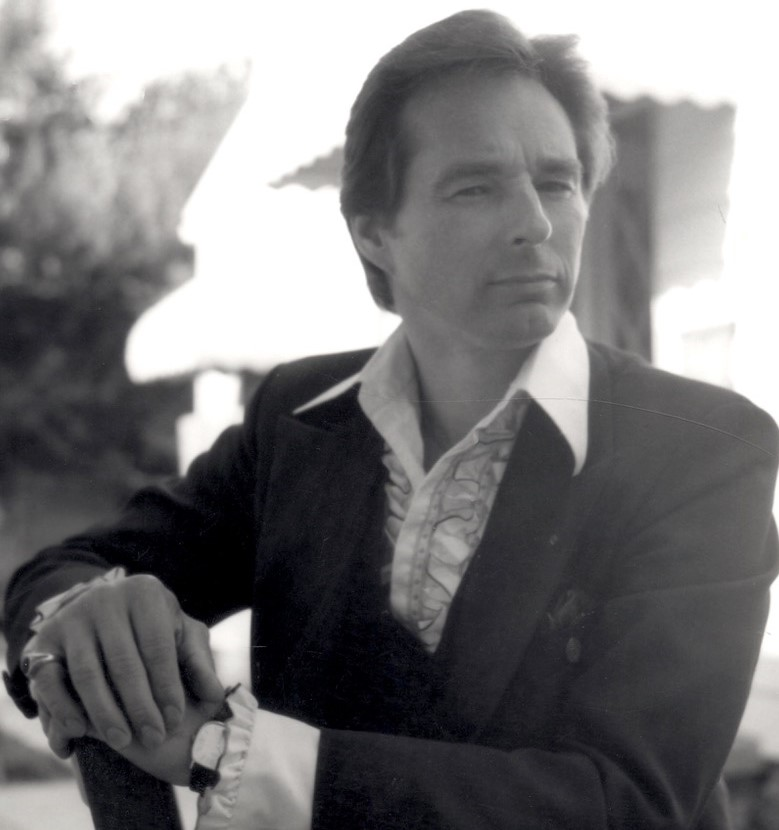
- Cervon c.1987
- Born: Andrew Bruce Cernava; June 20, 1941; Akron, Ohio
- Died: May 24, 2007 (aged 65); Ventura, California
- Occupation: Magician
- Known for: Close-up magic
- Spouse(s): Margaret (Peggi) Balkus (m. 1965; div. 1975) Linda Lipps (m. 1976–2007)
- Children: Two daughters, Kellie Cernava and Marcella Cervon
- Awards: 4 Academy of Magical Arts Awards 21 Nominations from the Academy of Magical Arts

Bruce Cervon (June 20, 1941 – May 24, 2007) was an American magician who was best known for his close-up magic, both through performance and invention. He published a series of books and helped to create a permanent record of the magic of Dai Vernon through The Vernon Chronicles, and Bruce Cervon's Castle Notebooks.

== Biography ==
=== Early years ===
Bruce Cervon was born Andrew Bruce Cernava (a Croatian surname) to Helen Rauzon Cernava and George Cernava in 1941. He changed the surname to Cervon (pronounced 'SIR-von'). Raised in Akron, Ohio, his introduction to magic came aged seven, through reading his father's copy of Professor Hoffman's Tricks with Cards, and through being given a Gilbert Mysto Magic set. He later found The Akron Novelty Company, which was the only magic store in the area. From an early age he performed for his classmates as The Amazing Andrews. He subsequently joined the Akron Magic Club. As he grew older, he began performing professionally at fairs and outdoor shows throughout Ohio and for various civic clubs throughout the Midwest. His wife Peggi, billed as "Crystal", was his assistant.

As a teen, Bruce also played guitar and sang in a few doo-wop groups, including Jordan and the Fascinations and The Caps. He played locally and recorded a few records.

Don Tanner brought Cervon to the 1958 Columbus MagiFest. In 1959 he was asked to perform close-up magic officially there. At the 1960 MagiFest he met Larry Jennings and the two became friends through a shared love of close-up sleight-of-hand magic.

=== Magic career ===
At the Columbus MagiFest in February 1964, Cervon and Jennings discussed The Magic Castle in Hollywood, California, where Dai Vernon had recently taken up residence. Cervon had not yet met Vernon, but both he and Jennings were admirers of Vernon's magic.

Jennings was the first to move to the Castle and wrote to Cervon praising Vernon and the newly-formed Magic Castle. Cervon followed him with his first wife Peggi, sleeping for a while on Jennings's floor. Cervon described the move as "The greatest thing I ever did in my life." Jennings introduced Cervon to Dai Vernon, which led to them discussing and practicing magic almost ceaselessly. To pay the bills, Cervon got a job as a garment cutter in the Los Angeles Garment District, where he worked for nearly five years. The Magic Castle became the epicenter for the development of close-up magic in the 1960s and 1970s, with magicians such as Dai Vernon, Ricky Jay, Persi Diaconis, Doug Henning, Larry Jennings, Bruce Cervon, Michael Ammar and John Carney at its heart. The period has been described as the "Golden Age of Close-up Magic".

Friction began to develop between Cervon and Jennings in the early 1970s as Vernon pitted the men against each other, separately challenging them to devise methods for effects, and suggesting the other had developed a better handling. However, in the 1980s their relationship improved, and they worked together on some of The Vernon Chronicles series. Cervon also spent much time discussing magic and developing close friendships with Dai Vernon, Jim Patton, and Mike Perovich.

Cervon understood the importance of audience management as well as technical skills, and his performances were often praised by his peers. He was nominated seven times for "Best Close-up Performer" and won it twice. In 1970 he did a cross-country lecture tour (accompanied on the first leg by Dai Vernon) for which he won "Best Lecturer"; and in 2000 he was honored with the "Performing Fellowship", the highest Academy of Magical Arts award a performer can receive. Dai Vernon himself praised Cervon, saying, "I would place him right at the top with the other 'greats' in magic."

While best known for his close-up magic, his stage magic was also notable, garnering comments such as: "Bruce was a superb stand-up performer. Not only did he perform a couple of illusions, but he also floored me with one of the most commercial comedic stand-up routines I had ever seen."

Cervon was well known for his admiration for Dai Vernon, saying on one occasion "I've been the number one Vernon fan since I was a young boy", and for his careful recording of everything he learned with Dai Vernon at The Magic Castle. His notes grew to fill thirteen binders, and became known as the legendary "Castle Notebooks." Later with Dai Vernon's permission the "Castle Notebooks" aided in the creation of "The Vernon Chronicles." The Notebooks themselves were posthumously published in five volumes. Cervon was also instrumental in the production of the Ultimate Secrets of Card Magic (1967), and of its reprint in 1995. It is through his efforts that many of Vernon's accomplishments have been preserved. Vernon described him as "my long time good friend."

Cervon was appreciated for his willingness to discuss details of the art with other magicians: as one writer expressed it after Cervon's death, "These magical enthusiasts and hobbyists spoke of times when Bruce had taken the time to share his time and knowledge with them. To their amazement this legitimate superstar of magic had gone out of his way to make himself available to them. Each story was a little different. Sometimes it was when Bruce would sit down and take the time to really teach them a routine or a move. Some people had stories that touched on the other facets of Bruce such as his love of music. Each person had been lifted to a new height by the way Bruce had generously shared his time."

He was a member of The Academy of Magical Arts at The Magic Castle and served on its board of directors. He was a member of the Screen Actor's Guild, The American Federation of Television and Radio Artists, and the American Guild of Variety Artists. He was also a member of The Magic Circle in Britain and of the Honorable Order of Kentucky Colonels. He was a court appointed expert witness on gambling for the California Superior Court and served as an expert consultant in the Los Angeles "Chinatown Bribery Case."

On his death, he was described as "one of our finest and most influential performer/thinkers," "One of the world's most respected practitioners of sleight-of-hand card magic" and "He was one of the supreme players in our Magic Game".

When asked to summarize what a performance of magic should do for the person watching it, Cervon replied, "It should blow them away. It should fool them. They should just go away from there going 'What happened? How did he do that?' They should be absolutely nonplussed. You want them to go away saying, 'This is the greatest thing I ever saw in my life.' The performance of magic should be an adult fairy tale."

=== Performances ===
Cervon was an in-demand entertainer for corporations such as the Creative Artists Agency, Baskin-Robbins, Nesbitt, ELP Communications, Crown Zellerbach, ARCO, Centinela Hospital Medical Center, Press-Telegram, Lockheed, Santa Monica Hospital, Bristol Corporation, UCLA, Gibraltar Savings and Loan, Century 21 Realty, UCSD, Orange County Register, American Legion, Haggar Co., Southern California Gas Company, Co. Salvation Army, Bekins, Allstate Savings & Loan, Blue Cross, Searle, Valvoline Oil Company, The Daily News, Schick, Macmillan Oil Company, Borg-Warner Chemicals, General Electric, 3M, Citizens Savings and Trust Company, The Tonight Show, Chempar, Downey Medical Center, KIIS-FM, and Sunkist.

He developed a relationship with Continental Airlines, with whom he introduced a long-running plan of featuring high-profile magicians on flights back and forth from Los Angeles to Chicago.

Cervon appeared on TV shows between the 1970s and 1990s, including The Mike Douglas Show, The Merv Griffin Show, That's Incredible!, The Jeffersons, Family Ties, Magic Palace and others. He also consulted or performed in many commercials, including for Pontiac, Bank of America, Continental Airlines, Pepsi-Cola, Shell Oil, and Rolf's Wallets.

He also performed at high-profile celebrity parties. He performed frequently for such notables as Cary Grant, Orson Welles, Jack Benny, Bette Davis, Rosalind Russell, Gregory Peck, Jimmy Stewart and Elvis Presley. He became known as the "Beverly Hills Magician" performing for the Glitterati. He was Johnny Carson's personal selection for the annual Tonight Show party.

=== Personal life ===
Cervon met his second wife, Linda Lipps Cervon, in the Close-up Gallery in The Magic Castle, where, during his performance, he spilled a glass of wine on her. Afterwards she approached him saying, "I didn't want to ruin your show, but my purse and shoes were absolutely filled with wine. The least you could do is buy me another glass!" He apologized and spent the rest of the evening talking with her.

They were married at the courthouse in San Francisco. They lived in Hollywood near the Magic Castle and the Farmers Market until 1992, when they moved to San Buenaventura, California just far enough to be away from the heat and smog of LA, but close enough for Bruce to continue his deep connection and love for the Magic Castle. They had a daughter, Marcella Alice, born in 1976, and a granddaughter, Eloise Eve, born in 2000. Bruce also had a daughter from his first marriage, Kellie Marie, born in 1969.

Cervon was a collector; not just of magic books and memorabilia, but Golden Age comics, rockabilly and doo-wop and records, hard-boiled mystery books, vintage paperbacks, pulp magazines, radio show premiums, vintage cereal boxes, paper toys, and anything Disney from 1928 to 1955.

=== Death ===
He died aged 65 from throat and lung cancer.

== Published works ==
=== Books ===
- Card Secrets of Bruce Cervon (1976) (ASIN B00UGGU0GC)
- The Cervon File (1988) (ISBN 0915181177)
- Ultra Cervon (1990) (ASIN B000J465TW)
- The Vernon Chronicles, Vol. 4: He Fooled Houdini - Dai Vernon a Magical Life (1992) with Keith Burns (ASIN B00FM0EL2Q)
- Bruce Cervon Hard-Boiled Mysteries (1998) (ASIN B0006R16IC)
- Bruce Cervon's Castle Notebooks (posthumously) Volumes 1 – 5 (2007 – 2009) (ASIN B01JM2DSS2)

=== Lecture notes ===
- Perpetual Motion Poker Routine (1969)
- Tricks of Conjuring (1985)
- Lecture Notes (1995)

=== Publication contributions ===
- Cardiste Magazine
- Epilogue Magazine
- Expert Card Chicanery
- Expert Card Conjuring
- Genii Magazine
- Hierophant Magazine
- Ibidem Magazine
- The Linking Ring
- M-U-M
- Magic & Spells Magazine
- Magick Magazine
- Pallbearers Review Magazine
- The Penumbra
- Richard's Almanac Magazine
- Society of American Magicians Magazine
- Talisman Magazine
- The Vernon Chronicles Volumes 1, 2 and 3
- Ultimate Secrets of Card Magic

=== Videos ===
- The Vernon Chronicles Volumes 1, 2 & 3 (1993)
- Ultra Cervon Volumes 1 and 2 (1994)
- Dai Vernon Secrets of Magic (1994)

=== Audio ===
- Bruce Cervon Magicasette (1986)

=== Marketed effects ===
- Back Up (N.D.)
- Jokers' Delight (N.D.)
- Perfect Match (1970)
- Dirty Deal (1970)
- The Cervon Monte (1984)
- The Giant Cervon Monte
- Bruce Cervon's The Black & White Trick (1989)
- The Colonel's Infernal Queen (1990)

== Awards ==
- 4 Academy of Magical Arts Awards
  - Best Close-up Magician of the Year (Twice; 1972 and 1975)
  - Best Lecturer of the Year (1970)
  - Performing Fellowship (1999)
- 21 Nominations from the Academy of Magical Arts
  - Best Close-up Magician of the Year
  - Best Lecturer of the Year
  - Best Magician of the Year
  - Best Parlour Magician of the Year

== See also ==
- The Magic Castle
