= Twenty-One Card Trick =

Mathematical explanation of the Twenty-one card trick with 21 cards: In each step, the cards are dealt into three piles. The piles are accumulated with the pile containing the target card (shaded yellow and labelled with the step number) put in the middle. After three steps, the middle card (*) is the one in all chosen piles.

The Twenty-One Card Trick, also known as the 11th card trick or three column trick, is a simple self-working card trick that uses basic mathematics to reveal the user's selected card.

The game uses a selection of 21 cards out of a standard deck. These are shuffled and the player selects one at random. The cards are then dealt out face up in three columns of 7 cards each. The player points to the column containing their card. The cards are picked up and the process is repeated three times, at which point the magician reveals the selected card.

== Variations ==
Minor aspects of the presentation are adjustable, for example the cards can be dealt either face-up or face-down. If they are dealt face-down then the spectator must look through each of the piles until finding which one contains the selected card, whereas if they are dealt face-up then an attentive spectator can immediately answer the question of which pile contains the selected card. Some performers deal the cards into face-up rows or columns instead of piles, which saves more time as all cards are partly visible.

When the same method is applied to three piles of nine cards each, it is called the 27 card trick. It is identical in principle.

== Method ==
The magician begins by handing the spectator the 21-card packet and asking them to look through it and select any one card to remember.

The cards are then dealt into three piles one at a time, like when dealing out hands in a card game. Each time they are dealt out, after the spectator indicates which pile contains the thought-of card, the magician places that pile between the other two. After the first time, the card will be one of the ones in position 8-14.

Animation demonstrating how the method excludes incorrect cards each time a pile is selected, leaving the selected card in position 11.

When the cards are dealt out the second time, the selection will be the third, fourth, or fifth card in the pile it ends up in. In picking up the piles, the magician places this pile between the other two again. This ensures that the selection will now be one of the ones in position 10-12.

The third time the cards are dealt out, the selection will be the fourth card in whichever pile it ends up in. On the third deal, as soon as the spectator indicates which pile contains the selection, the magician knows that it is the fourth, or middle, card in that pile. If the magician gathers up the piles again, as before with the pile containing the selection in the middle, the selection will be the eleventh card in the 21 card packet.

If 27 cards are used, the procedure is the same but the selection will be the fourteenth card in the packet.

== Literature ==
- Professor Hoffmann, Modern Magic ISBN 0-486-23623-4
