= Double lift =

Skill used for card tricks

A double lift is a sleight of hand maneuver used by magicians in card magic. It is a method by which the identity of the top card may be kept secret by lifting the top two cards as one, making it seem as if only the top card is picked up, often used as a switch. Similar techniques may be applied to more than two cards to perform a triple or even quadruple lift. The term was coined by Theo Annemann.

When the card is shown to the audience, the audience is tricked into believing that they are shown the top card in the deck where in fact they are shown the second card. When the cards are displayed, the maneuver is sometimes called the "double turnover".

Some versions of the Ambitious Card routine rely almost entirely upon this sleight. In combination with a few other mechanics and good showmanship, entire routines can be made out of this single move.

== Origins ==
The first recorded publishing of the double lift is in Richard Neve's book The Merry Companion in 1776. It can be seen on page 141, item XXV under "to seem to change the top card of the pack into another". The double lift was next seen in print in the 19th century in Jean Nicholas Ponsin's Nouvelle Magie Blanche Dévoilée. The earliest reference to the double lift in the 20th century is in John Northern Hilliard's book Greater Magic.

Many confuse the creation of the double lift with the Dai Vernon double turnover, which is an extension of the double lift where two cards are flipped to hide the identity of the top card. Still, many magicians and magic historians debate that Vernon was the creator, though he never has claimed to be the creator. In an interview in the 1982 small-time film The Wonder of Magic, Dai Vernon said that he "may be the creator" of the double turnover, but was not certain.
