= Spelling Bee (card trick) =

Card trick

Spelling Bee may refer to one of several card tricks that revolve around the spelling of card types, audience member names, or words suggested by the audience. Many make use of decks prepared in advance in order to provide the illusion of spelling card names in a particular sequence. Jean Hugard's Encyclopedia of Card Tricks lists a number of such spelling-based tricks, many of which are considered to be self-working.

== Pre-arranged deck ==
An ace, one of the cards whose names are spelled during this trick

In the first style of Spelling Bee trick, the magician shuffles a deck of playing cards and removes a stack of thirteen cards from the top. Holding these cards face down, they state they will be able to spell the name of each card using only that stack. They will draw cards one at a time from the stack. For each card drawn, they spell one letter from the intended card's name, then place the card on the bottom of the deck. After the card's whole name is spelled, the next card drawn will be the intended card. For example, if the magician wishes to spell out "ace", they will draw three cards, saying the letters "a", "c", and "e" as they go. Then they will draw a fourth card, which will be an ace. The ace is removed from the deck. The magician can then continue through the deck, repeating the process for "two", "three", and so on, up to "queen", until the magician is holding only one card, which will be a king. John Scarne's variation on the trick includes some intentional misspellings as a performance element.

This trick requires some preparation on the part of the magician, who arranges the cards in order before beginning the performance. When spelling from ace to king, the order is 3-8-7-A-Q-6-4-2-J-K-10-9-5. A mnemonic is as follows:

387 years ago, a queen, 64 years old, had 2 sons, Jack and King. Jack worked until 10, but King worked a 9 to 5.

For two to ace, the deck is arranged J-4-9-2-K-8-A-5-7-3-Q-10-6. At the beginning of the trick, the magician performs a false shuffle that does not disturb the arrangement of the top stack. The trick can also be performed without the false shuffle, making it accessible to the unskilled performer.

The Encyclopedia of Card Tricks presents a more complex variation of this trick, called the Shuffled Spelling Bee. This version uses the entire deck, with the black suits, the spades and clubs, arranged in advance. An audience participant is given a magician's choice that results in the unwanted red suits, the hearts and diamonds, being removed. The spades are provided to the audience member, and the magician then spells out card names using the clubs. A further variation on this trick by Stuart Lee uses all four suits.

== Audience-selected cards ==
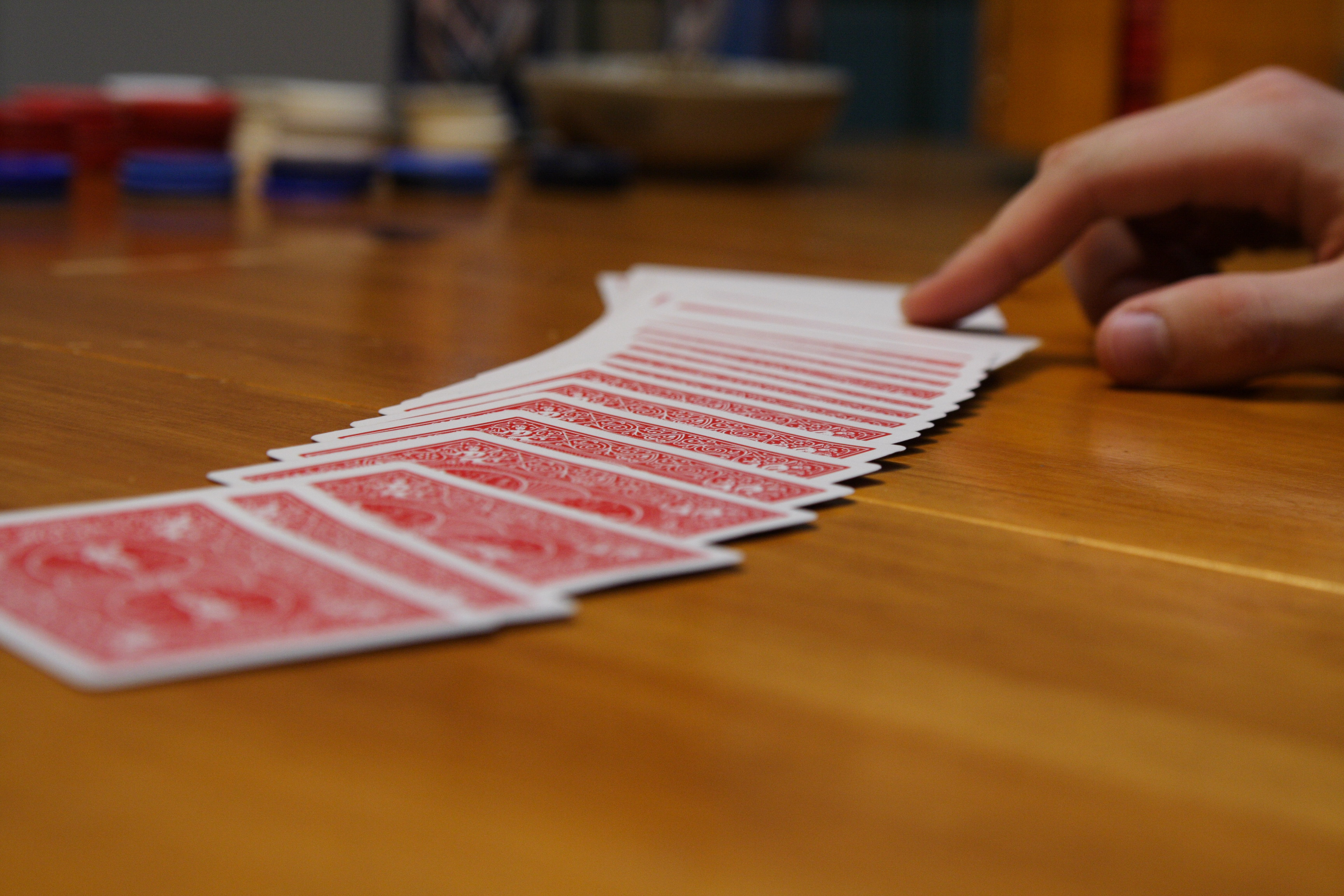
A person selecting a card

The second style of "Spelling Bee" tricks involves one or more audience members selecting and memorizing a card. It is replaced it in the deck, which is then apparently shuffled. The magician reveals the selected card after drawing cards to spell out a word provided by audience members, often the name of the selected card. The magician either controls the placement of the selected card in the deck, knows its location with the help of a key card, or uses sleight of hand to force it out at the appropriate time. In either case, this creates the illusion that the magician was able to predict the appearance of the card with magic. For example, the magician may force the selected card to be the fifth from the top of the deck, then select a volunteer with a four-letter name to deal one card for each letter in their name - four in total. The magician then instructs the volunteer to deal the next card, which will be the selected card.

== Nine cards in three piles ==
A third variation uses nine cards, selected at random. They are divided into three piles of three cards. A participant looks at the bottom card of one pile and memorizes it. That pile is then placed on top of the other two piles, such that the memorized card will be the third card from the top. The magician then begins dealing cards onto the table one at a time from the nine-card stack, one for each letter in a set of words according to a formula. At the end of every step except the last, the remaining cards are placed on top of the dealt cards; this becomes the stack for the next step.

The formula is specific and must be followed exactly for the trick to work. In order, the magician spells out the face value of the selected card, the word "of", the suit of the card (always in the plural form), and any five-letter word of their choice. The top card on the final stack of five dealt cards will always be the original selected card.
