= The Circus Card Trick =

Magic card trick

The Circus Card Trick is a self-working card trick where the performer uses verbal misdirection to prompt the participant into betting that the performer has failed to execute the trick correctly. The performer exploits the ambiguous wording of their patter to win the bet in a manner unexpected by the audience. It is often recommended for beginning magicians due to its entertaining and self-working nature.

The trick has its origins as a short con. It has been described as an "old, old trick...used by circus grifters against the gullible and the greedy." When performing for amusement, the performer will usually decline to collect on the bet.

== Performance ==
The performer claims that they will be able to find a spectator's card in the deck by some means such as touch alone. They allow the spectator to select a card, memorize it, and return it to the deck. They then deal through the deck, turning cards face up onto the table. When the spectator's card is reached, the performer continues past it, ensuring that the participant notices that their card has been seemingly ignored by the apparently incompetent performer. After dealing several more cards, the performer announces that "The next card I turn over will be yours!" The spectator, having seen the magician pass the selected card, assumes that the performer refers to the next card on top of the deck and believes that the magician will fail the trick.

The performer will at this point offer to wager a sum of money that the next card they turn over will indeed be the spectator's. Knowing that their card has been passed over, the spectator will usually feel this is a safe bet.

Once the bet is accepted, the performer reaches over to the line of dealt cards and turns the spectator's card face down, thus technically winning the bet in an unexpected manner.

== Method ==
The magician will have forced the spectator's card in some manner, ensuring they knew its position in advance or could spot it later. One method is for the performer to note the bottom card of the deck prior to starting the trick. When the selection is returned to the deck, the magician has it placed on top and gives the deck a cut, placing the card they noted above the selection. While dealing through the deck, the magician knows that the card after the one they noted (the original bottom card of the deck) is the selection.
