= Frederick Braue =

American journalist

- Born: March 9, 1906; Alameda, California
- Died: July 3, 1962 (aged 56)
- Occupations: Close up Magician, Journalist
- Known for: Sleight of hand, Card magic

Frederick Braue (pronounced BROW-ee; March 9, 1906 – July 3, 1962) was an American journalist notable for his contribution to the field of card magic. He was a semi-professional magician, specializing in card magic, of which he was a master.

== Career ==
In the 1940s, Frederick Braue edited a children's page, called Aunt Elsie's Page, for the Oakland Tribune newspaper.

=== Magic ===
Braue co-authored several books with Jean Hugard, including Expert Card Technique and Royal Road to Card Magic. As Braue and Hugard lived on opposite sides of the America, they wrote their books via correspondence.

Frederick Braue contributed to many magazines including a column in Hugard's Magic Monthly, which he edited from 1959 to 1962. He also invented numerous card sleights and effects including:

- Braue Reversal
- Braue Addition
- Rear Palm (in 1935)
- Homing Card

== Published works ==
In collaboration with Jean Hugard:

- Expert Card Technique (1940)
- Miracle Methods N° 1 : Stripper Deck (1941)
- Miracle methods N° 2 : Gambling (1942)
- Miracle Methods N° 3 : Prepared Cards (1942)
- Miracle Methods N° 4 : Tricks and Sleights (1943)
- The Invisible Pass (1946)
- Showtoppers with Cards (1948)
- Royal Road to Card Magic (1949)
- Fred Braue On False Deals (1978)
