= Edge sorting =

Advantage gambling technique

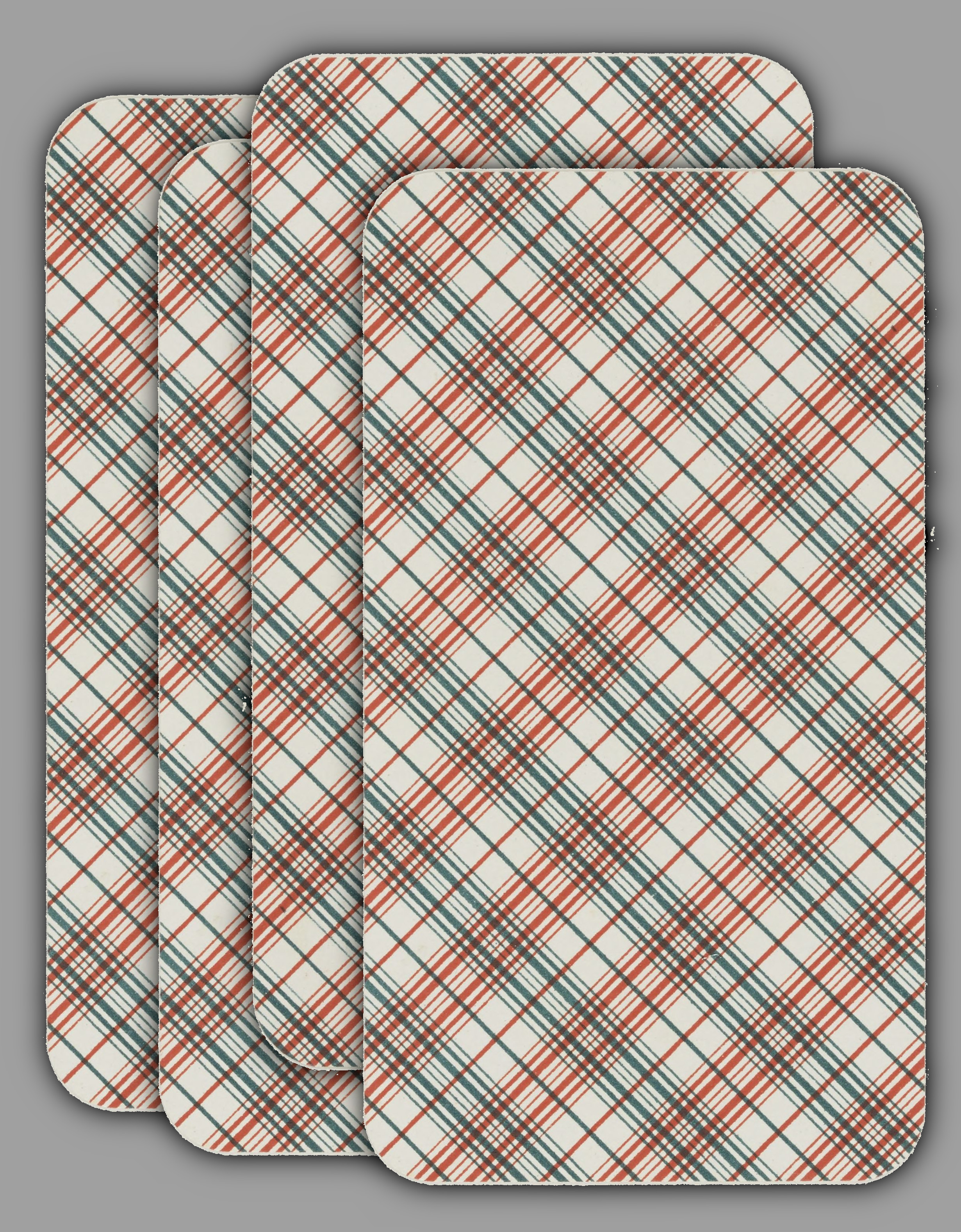
A deck of cards with an asymmetrical back pattern may be susceptible to edge sorting, if the pattern is the same on every card. A card which has been rotated 180 degrees (here, the third card from the left) will become visibly distinct from one which has not.

Edge sorting is a technique used in advantage gambling where a player determines whether a face-down playing card is likely to be low or high at casino table games by observing, learning, and exploiting subtle unintentional differences on the backs of the cards being dealt. The technique requires the player to trick the dealer into rotating specific, high-value cards so that they are distinguishable from lower-value ones after shuffling.

Applied by poker player Phil Ivey and subsequently challenged in court by the casino in which he did so, the England and Wales High Court and Court of Appeal and the UK Supreme Court ruled the technique to be cheating in civil law, and that a casino was justified in refusing payment of winnings. This ruling would not be applicable if the player simply took advantage of an observed error or anomaly in the deck for which they were not responsible.

== Technique ==
Many packs of cards produced by manufacturers have unintentional, almost indistinguishable edge irregularities. Typically the backs of every card in such a pack are identical, but the two long edges of each card are distinguishable from one another: the back pattern of one card is not symmetrical to another that has been rotated 180° (half a full turn).

During the course of a game, the player asks the dealer to rotate high-value face-up cards, saying for example that they feel it will bring them luck. The dealer, indulging superstition, does not realize they are unwittingly orienting the cards such that valuable high cards are oriented one way in the deck and low cards the other way round. The unintentional card edge irregularity thus makes the high or low value of face-down cards apparent to an observer aware of how the dealer has been tricked into orienting them. This orientation will remain so long as the cards are not "washed", shuffled in a way that rotates them. Thus, the player must also request that the dealer shuffle the cards with an automatic shuffler, which does not change the orientation as a manual shuffle might. The dealer is not obliged to comply with any of these requests, but will usually do so if thought to be the result of gambler superstition or mistrust.

Over the course of a game being played this way, low cards will tend to be oriented one way, high cards the other. Once a significant proportion of cards have been rotated, any player who knows this can gain a statistical edge more than outweighing house edge by using the knowledge whether the card to be turned is likely to be low or high.

== Legality ==
In 2012, poker player Phil Ivey and partner Cheung Yin Sun won US$9.6 million playing baccarat at the Borgata casino in Atlantic City, New Jersey. In April 2014, the Borgata filed a lawsuit against Ivey and Cheung for their winnings. In 2016, a Federal Judge ruled that Ivey and Cheung Yin Sun were required to repay US$10 million to the Borgata. U.S. District Judge Noel Hillman ruled that while Ivey and Sun did not commit fraud, they did breach their contract with the casino by not abiding by a New Jersey Casino Controls Act provision that prohibited marking cards. Although they did not mark the cards, using the tiny imperfections in the cards to gain an advantage qualified as an illegal advantage.

Later in 2012, the Huffington Post reported that Ivey had won £7.7 million (roughly US$17 million today) playing punto banco, a version of baccarat, at Crockfords casino in London. Crockfords refunded his £1 million stake (US$2.2 million today) and agreed to send him his winnings but ultimately refused payment. Ivey sued them for payment but lost in the High Court of England and Wales; it was judged that the edge sorting was "cheating for the purpose of civil law." It was accepted that Ivey and others genuinely considered that edge sorting was not cheating and deemed immaterial that the casino could easily have protected itself. The judgment observed that Ivey had gained an advantage by actively using a croupier as his innocent agent rather than taking advantage of an error or anomaly on the casino's part. Ivey appealed against the judgment, but was unsuccessful.

He further appealed to the UK Supreme Court (see Ivey v Genting Casinos) which also decided in favour of the casino. All five justices upheld the decision of the court of appeal, "which dismissed his case on the basis that dishonesty was not a necessary element of 'cheating'."

== See also ==
- Card counting
- One-way deck
