= Ed Marlo =

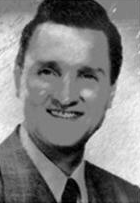
- Born: Edward Malkowski; October 10, 1913
- Died: November 7, 1991 (aged 78)
- Occupation: Magician

Ed Marlo (also known as Edward Marlo) (born in Chicago, Illinois, October 10, 1913 – November 7, 1991) was a magician who specialized in card magic. He referred to himself and others of his specialty as 'cardicians'.

== Career ==
One of the most notable names in card magic, Marlo himself coined the term cardician, a term which has since been used for performers who do card magic exclusively. His first publication in 1938, Pasteboard Presto, merely hinted at the bulk of work which was to follow.

The many sleights he created have changed the face of card magic. One notable example is his snap change, used in David Blaine´s Street Magic Special. Marlo was a prolific publisher of card magic, but he was not without controversy. Many of his students found success as creators and performers of magic such as the world-famous Bill Malone. Ed Marlo was also noted for his ever present toupee.

Marlo wrote over sixty books and manuscripts, and contributed over 2000 tricks in the field of card magic. He did not limit himself to cards as he also authored works on coin magic and dice magic. His most famous works are The Cardician and Revolutionary Card Technique, the latter of which was originally published as a series but later compiled into one weighty tome.

He also wrote a series of private manuscripts that were circulated only among the top card magicians of the era. Titles included Riffle Shuffle Systems, Patented False Shuffle, Faro Controlled Miracles and others. They are extremely rare and highly sought after.

Marlo also authored a number of magazines titled, Marlo Magazines. These items are more like books as each one is more than two hundred pages. They are extremely rare and costly, when they come up for sale.

Marlo gave lectures and performed rarely, and only a few times outside of Chicago.

Professionally, Marlo was a machinist. He made modifications and configurations to the machines in the shop so that they could produce eight hours of work in less than one hour. Ed kept this information to himself. His boss would believe that progress at the end of each work day was that of eight hours, when in reality it only took one. The other seven hours Marlo was getting paid to play with his cards.

His favourite card was the seven of diamonds. His wife would always make sure a certain amount of sevens of diamonds were in his jacket.

== See also ==
- List of magicians
