= Gambler's palm =

Card magic technique

The gambler's palm is a card magic technique used to "palm" a card (to temporarily hide it during a magic trick).

In the gambler's palm the playing card is placed in the hand lengthwise as in the magician's palm, but is retained by pressure between the little finger and the right side of the thumb, which lies flat against the left side of the hand. The advantages of this palm is that the card is not bent while palming, and the hand may be laid flat on the card table.
