= Paul Curry (magician) =

American magician and businessman

Paul Curry (August 19, 1917 – February 19, 1986) was the vice-president of the Blue Cross Insurance Company of New York, and a famous amateur magician who became well known in the magic community for inventing highly-original card magic.

Many magicians have performed illusions and effects created by Curry. Doug Henning used Curry's "The Sliding Knot" in one of his TV specials. Curry's most famous creation is Out of This World, a self-working card trick that he created in 1942, at the age of 25. Curry is the author of a number of books and manuscripts dealing with his many original magical creations.

He has also been credited with inventing the missing square puzzle.

On 12 March 1977, the Academy of Magical Arts at The Magic Castle awarded Paul Curry a "Creative Fellowship" award.

== Selected books ==
- Paul Curry's Worlds Beyond (2002) ISBN 0-945296-36-3
- Magician's Magic (1965) ISBN 0-486-43176-2
