= Marshall Brodien =

American magician (1934–2019)

- Born: July 10, 1934; Chicago, Illinois, U.S.
- Died: March 8, 2019 (aged 84); Geneva, Illinois, U.S.
- Occupation: magician
- Years active: 1962-2007
- Spouse: Mary
- Children: 6

Marshall Brodien (July 10, 1934 – March 8, 2019) was an American professional magician who played Wizzo the Wizard, a wizard clown character which appeared on WGN-TV's Bozo's Circus and The Bozo Show from 1968 to 1994.

== Early life ==
Brodien was born and raised in Chicago, Illinois. At age eight, he took an interest in magic after a magician came to perform at his school. He never graduated high school and began working at age 14, selling and demonstrating magic tricks and novelties at the Magic Center in downtown Chicago.

At age 16, Brodien worked at Chicago's Riverview Park, performing magic tricks.

Brodien served in the Army during the 1950s at Fort Carson in Colorado and performed more than 700 shows while in the Army at hospitals, non-commissioned officers clubs and private parties.

== Career ==
Brodien, who had been making semi-regular guest appearances performing magic tricks as himself on Bozo's Circus since 1962, began appearing as a wizard character in an Arabian Nights-inspired costume in 1968 and evolved into Wizzo the Wizard by the early 1970s. He was billed as being from "Arobia" and possessed the magical Stone of Zanzabar. According to Brodien, the first time he touched Bozo (Bob Bell) with the stone, Bozo quipped: "I remember when you got stoned at the Zanzabar."

Oliver O. Oliver (Ray Rayner) left Bozo's Circus in 1971 and was briefly replaced by Pat Tobin as Oliver's cousin Elrod T. Potter, and then by magician John Thompson (an acquaintance of Brodien's) as Clod Hopper. By 1973, WGN gave up on Thompson and increased Brodien's appearances as Wizzo. Brodien left the program in 1994.

In 1970, Brodien was the creator and spokesperson for a trick deck of cards called TV Magic Cards, a renamed Svengali deck that was heavily advertised on television and as black and white ads in comicbooks. TV Magic Cards resembled an ordinary deck of playing cards, except that the cards could be shown as all the same card. Many other card tricks could be performed with the deck. Brodien demonstrated the cards in a well-known TV commercial which ran for several years. Over 17 million decks of the cards were sold. Brodien sold his company in 1992.

Brodien had a car with vanity license plates reading "WIZ" and custom pin-striping which contained a tiny "WIZ" within the striping.

== Personal life ==
Brodien designed magic trick sets for children through a company called Cadaco Toys. He occasionally made public appearances in the Chicago area, and a biography, The Magical Life Of Marshall Brodien, was published in 2007. One of his Wizzo costumes is in the WGN-TV Bozo's Circus exhibit at the Museum of Broadcast Communications.

Brodien was diagnosed with Alzheimer's disease in 2007.

In 2018, the mayor of Geneva, Illinois, announced that July 10 would be known as “Marshall Brodien Day” in the city of Geneva.

Brodien and his wife Mary had six children and stepchildren. Brodien died on March 8, 2019, from Alzheimer's disease in Geneva, Illinois at the age of 84.
