= Crockfords (casino) =

Casino

Coordinates: 51.5064°N 0.1491°W

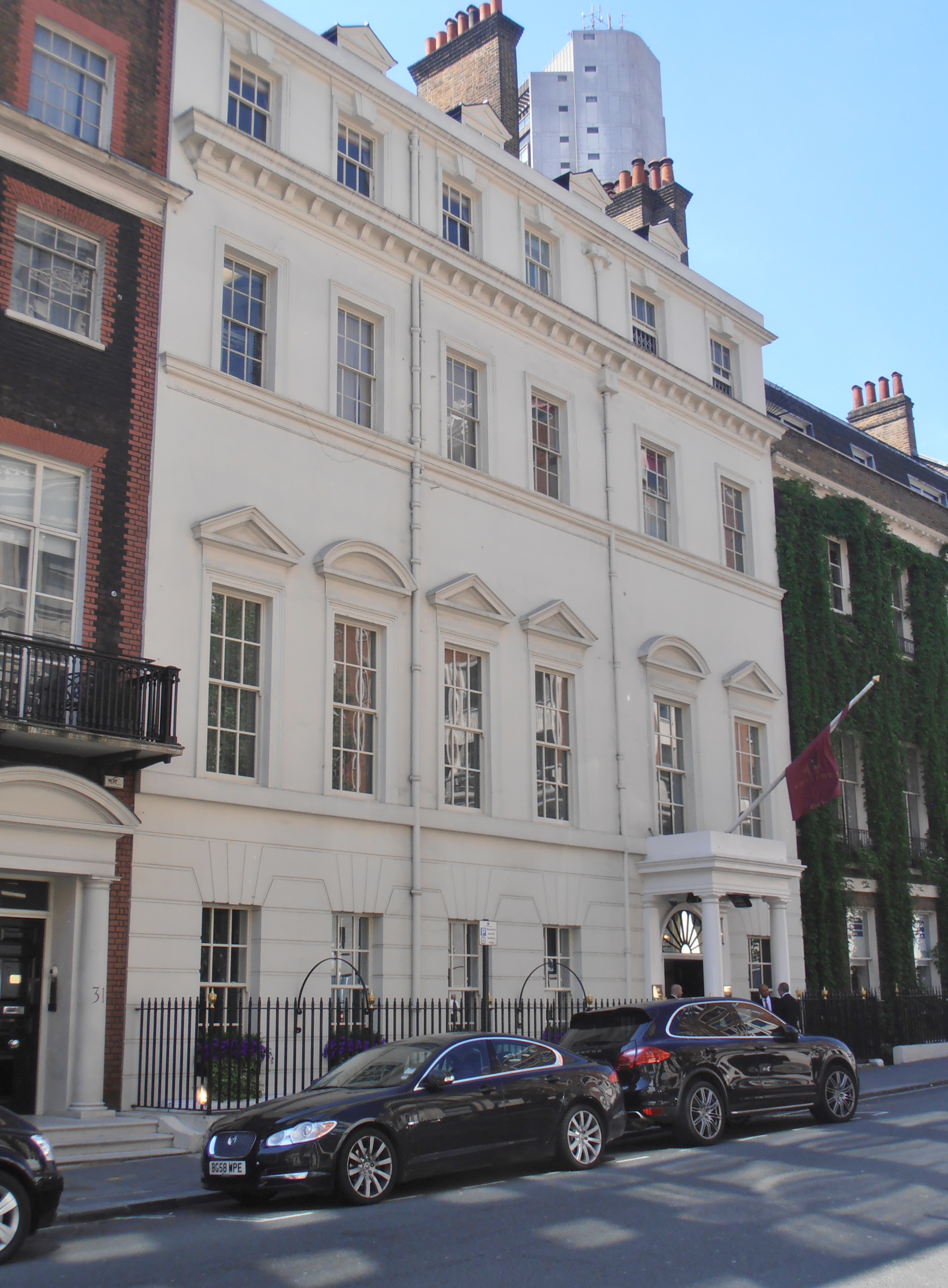
- Interactive map of Crockfords
- Location: London, W1
- Closed: October 2023
- Casino type: Land-based
- Owner: Genting Group
- Website: www.crockfords.com

Crockfords (also known as Crockfords Club or Crockfords Casino) was a casino in London located at Curzon Street. The casino took its name from the former gentlemen's club in London called Crockford's. It closed permanently in October 2023.

== History ==
The modern incarnation of Crockford's was founded in 1928 or 1929 as a bridge club, located at 21 Hertford Street. It was founded by dissatisfied members of the Almack's bridge club, led by Colonel Henry Beasley and a Mrs. Bates. The name was chosen after one of the founders read a news item about the original Crockford's club having been established 100 years earlier.

The club moved to 16 Carlton House Terrace in 1934.

UK gambling laws were loosened by the Betting and Gaming Act 1960, leading to Crockford's evolution into a casino, one of over 300 that opened in London in the following years. Businessman Tim Holland, raised £48,000 to buy Crockford's operating company in 1961 and introduced chemin-de-fer (a variety of baccarat) to the club. By 1963, Crockford's claimed to be the biggest chemin-de-fer parlor in the world, with an annual handle of £25 million.

In 1966, Crockford's was sold to Pakistani businessman Aziz Fancy. Fancy then sold the club in 1968 to Gilbert Benaim and Joseph Khaida for $2.4 million. Authorities denied the renewal of Crockford's gaming license due to undisclosed concerns about Benaim and Khaida, leading to the club's closure in 1970. Maxwell Joseph then bought the shuttered club for £175,000 through his casino company, Curzon House Investments, with plans to reopen it. Crockford's reopened in October 1972, by which time Curzon House Investments had been acquired by Coral. At the time, the casino had seats for 400 gamblers, with games including roulette, blackjack, kaluki, craps, punto banco baccarat, stud poker, and backgammon.

In 1981, Coral was facing possible cancellation of its gaming licenses, and sold Crockfords, along with other casinos, to Lonrho.

Crockfords moved to its final location, 30 Curzon Street, in 1983. The building was a Grade I listed historic town home built in 1771 for the Marquess of Bath. Ladbrokes had renovated the building to serve as a casino, but the company's gaming licenses were revoked before it could open, so the leasehold was sold to Lonrho.

Lonrho sold its casino division, including Crockfords, to leisure company Brent Walker in 1987. Brent Walker bought the freehold interest in the building from Daejan Holdings in 1988 for £17.5 million.

Brent Walker then sold the club for £50 million to a management buy-in team financed by Montagu Private Equity in 1989. In 1993, Crockfords became publicly listed through a reverse merger with TV-am plc, a defunct TV production company, which became Crockfords PLC. The company changed its name to Capital Corporation in 1995. Capital Corporation was then acquired by Stanley Leisure in May 1999.

In September 1999, Kerry Packer reportedly lost £11 million ($16.5 million) at Crockfords, overtaking the previous British record loss at the time of £8 million by Greek millionaire Frank Saracakis, which also occurred at Crockfords.

Genting Group acquired Stanley Leisure, including Crockfords, in 2006.

In 2012, poker player Phil Ivey, won £7.7 million after beating the casino in a session of punto banco baccarat, but was refused payment due to allegations of edge sorting. Ivey admitted to edge sorting, considering it a legitimate strategy and later sued the casino, but the court ruled in favor of Crockfords, stating Ivey was "cheating under civil law". Ivey appealed this ruling, but lost his appeal in October 2017 in the UK Supreme Court.

In October 2023, Crockfords closed permanently. Genting Group stated that "there are a combination of factors which have put high-end London casinos at a competitive disadvantage to other global market places and this has led to an unsustainable future for Crockfords in Mayfair". Beginning in 2017, the Crockfords brand name was reused for a luxury hotel located at Genting Highlands, with another property in Las Vegas subsequently opening in 2023.

== See also ==
- Gambling in the United Kingdom
- List of casinos
