= Out of This World (card trick) =

Card trick created by Paul Curry

The Out of This World card trick with a prepared deck of 10 cards (solid cards are face-up; hatched cards are of the hatch colour, face-down): 1. The top and bottom cards are extracted as marker cards.; 2. The audience member freely deals cards onto either marker; the piles may be of unequal size. The illusionist stops them when only one black card is left on the deck.; 3. The illusionist reveals and puts the next two cards onto opposing piles.; 4. After the audience member freely deals the remaining cards, the illusionist sneakily moves the bottom card of the incorrect pile to the top.; 5. The illusionist splits the piles and shows that their colours match.

Out of This World is a card trick created by magician Paul Curry in 1942, in which an audience member is asked to sort a deck into piles of red and black cards, without looking at the faces. Many performers have devised their own variations of this trick. It is often billed as "the trick that fooled Winston Churchill" due to a story describing how it was performed for him during World War II. The method behind the trick is simple and essentially self-working, and can be enhanced by the presentation of the performer and the use of other principles of magic.

== Effect ==
1. The performer takes a deck of cards, and places on the table two face-up "marker" cards, one black and one red; the black on the left and the red on the right. The performer tells the spectator that he or she is going to deal cards face-down from the deck and the object of the exercise is for the subject to use their intuition to identify whether each card in the deck is black or red.
2. The performer takes one card at a time from the deck, face down, and asks the subject to attempt to divine whether it is black or red. The subject states their choice, and the performer then places the card in line with the appropriately coloured marker card, overlapping it at the bottom.
3. About halfway through the deck, the performer stops and announces that it is necessary to switch sides, in order to prevent a possible preference for one side over another from confusing the results. The performer deals two new marker cards onto the existing lines: a red one on the left, and a black one on the right.
4. The performer then continues as before, dealing cards face-down from the deck onto the subject's choice of the black or red line.
5. When the deck is exhausted, the performer instructs the subject to gather up and somehow reveal the left-hand line of cards; the performer does the same for the right-hand line.
6. The exposed lines reveal that every one of the subject's guesses was correct, and the black and red cards have been exactly sorted by colour.

== Method ==
The deck in use is either stacked or partially stacked prior to performance, or manipulated in the course of performance to form a partial or full stack, in which there is a separation between the red and black cards, with a run of each colour comprising either half the deck or a substantial portion of the stack near the top.

In the first round of dealing face-down cards, all of the cards dealt will be of one colour. The switching of sides occurs at the halfway point through the deck because that is the point at which the first colour cards will be exhausted and the second colour of cards will begin to be dealt.

To understand why this enables the trick to work, think about what will be in the two lines of cards at the end of the trick. The left-hand line will begin with (for example) a black marker card (placed at the start), followed by the face-down black cards from the top of the deck, then the red marker card (placed at the side switch), then the face-down red cards from the bottom of the deck. That's (black marker) (black cards) (red marker) (red cards). In other words, this line is exactly right, and is given to the subject to gather up.

The right-hand line will begin with the red marker card (placed at the start), followed by the face-down black cards from the top of the deck, then the black marker card (placed at the side switch), then the face-down red cards from the bottom of the deck. That's (red marker) (black cards) (black marker) (red cards). Although incorrect, this can be instantly made to appear correct by moving the red marker card from one end of the line to the other, or by reversing the order of all other cards in the line. This must be performed by the magician during the act of gathering up the right-hand line of cards, while the subject is distracted by gathering up their own line.

== Link with Winston Churchill ==
Chapter 13 of the book Magician's Magic by Paul Curry describes a dinner party during World War II at which a magician named Harry Green performed the trick for Winston Churchill. According to the book, Churchill insisted that the trick be performed for him half a dozen times, and was "repeatedly baffled".
