= Nate Leipzig =

American vaudeville magician (1873–1939)

Nate Leipzig (born Nathan Leipziger; May 31, 1873 – October 13, 1939) was an American vaudeville magician who performed in Europe and the United States.

== Early years ==
Leipzig was born the third youngest of eight children—seven boys and one girl—in Stockholm, Sweden.

He grew up in Detroit, Michigan, and at 12 years old started work as a lens-maker for L. Black & Co. He then joined Max Rudelsheimer's optical business, and worked there 17 years, but continued to accept performance engagements.

== Magician career ==
In May 1938, Leipzig was elected president of the Society of American Magicians (SAM). Previous presidents of SAM include Howard Thurston and Harry Houdini.

His innovations of sleight of hand, particularly with card tricks and close-up magic, earned him respect among fellow magicians. Leipzig was the first magician to perform a stage act using playing cards and thimbles, and is credited with inventing the side steal—a technique for secretly removing a playing card from the middle of a deck of cards.

== See also ==
- List of magicians
- List of people from Detroit
