= Self-working magic =

Magic that works by a fixed procedure

The illusionist sums the first number on each card on which the target number appears. In the SVG file, click a card to toggle it.

Self-working magic is a commonly used term in magic to refer to tricks that work simply from following a fixed procedure, rather than relying on trickery, sleight-of-hand, or other hidden moves.

== Description ==
The term "self-working" has come into common usage in the world of magic as a reference to tricks that do not require sleight of hand or secret moves. For example, Glenn Gravatt compiled numerous such tricks in his book Encyclopedia of Self-working Card Tricks (1936), which was later compiled with Second Encyclopedia of Card Tricks (1936) to create Jean Hugard's classic text Encyclopedia of Card Tricks in 1937. Strictly speaking no magic is "self-working", since tricks still need to be performed and presented correctly, and so some writers prefer the term "auto-magic", which was popularized by Michael Breggar in his monthly "Auto-Magic" column in The Linking Ring.

Many self-working card tricks rely on mathematical principles, and can be replicated by following the steps correctly. A simple example is the trick "Magical 13", where a deck of playing cards is secretly set up with all the suits in order. Because cards of the same value are exactly 13 away from each other in this prearranged order, the spectator can cut the deck as often as they like, but when they deal the deck into 13 piles, each pile will consist of four cards with exactly the same value.

Some consider optical illusions and some science demonstrations, where the wonder comes from unexpectedness of a natural phenomenon, to fall into the category of self-working magic as well.

== Examples ==
Explanation of the Piano Trick: 1. Cards are put in pairs, except for the last card, between the spectator's fingers and thumbs.; 2. The cards are gathered into two piles.; 3. The illusionist pretends to magically move the single card to the smaller pile.; 4. The smaller pile is shown to have three pairs and a single card.

Some card tricks are self-working, one of the most notable examples being Out Of This World (1942) by Paul Curry.

Many people are first introduced to performing magic via self-working card tricks. Some of the most widely known self-working card tricks include the Twenty-One Card Trick, The Four Robbers, The Piano Trick, Spectator Cuts To The Aces, The Spelling Bee, The Circus Card Trick, and Do As I Do.

== Resources ==
Classic texts on self-working tricks include Scarne on Card Tricks (1950) by John Scarne, Self-Working Card Tricks (1976) and similar books by Karl Fulves published by Dover Publications, and the Card College Light trilogy by Roberto Giobbi.
