= Magician's palm =

Magic card trick

In magic, magician's palm is a method for hiding a playing card in a seemingly-empty hand, in which the card is placed lengthwise against the palm and retained in the hand. The thumb sticking out as if "hitchhiking" is a "tell" or sign that a card is being palmed.
