= Blackstone's Card Trick Without Cards =

Magic trick

Blackstone's Card Trick Without Cards is a magic trick. As the trick requires only that a card is thought of, it does not require the use of a deck of cards.

== Method ==
A spectator is instructed to think of any card (other than the joker). The magician then gives the following instructions:

- Take the card's face value (with aces counting as 1 and royal cards counting as 11, 12 and 13 respectively)
- Double it.
- Add 3.
- Multiply by 5.
- If the card the spectator is thinking of is a spade, subtract 1.
- If the card the spectator is thinking of is a heart, subtract 2.
- If the card the spectator is thinking of is a club, subtract 3.
- If the card the spectator is thinking of is a diamond, subtract 4.

The spectator then tells the magician the number the spectator is now thinking of. The magician then names the card.

== Secret ==
The series of mathematical manipulations results in any given card producing a unique number. The multiplication by 2 and 5 means that the final number is ten times the card's value, plus a fixed 15 (for the addition of 3 and the multiplication by 5) and an additional suit-dependent figure. Thus both suit and value are readily identifiable.

To find their card, you take the first digit of their number and subtract 1 to get the number on the card. The suit is based on the second digit of their number. 4 for Spades, 3 for Hearts, 2 for Clubs, and 1 for Diamonds. For example, if their number is 64, then their card would be the 5 of Spades.

== Literature ==
- Harry Blackstone, Blackstone's Tricks Anyone Can Do ISBN 0-8065-0862-0
- John Scarne, Scarne on Card Tricks ISBN 0-486-42735-8
