= Crimp, Cornwall =

Hamlet in Cornwall, England

Coordinates: 50.9116°N 4.4836°W

Crimp: Cornish: Krympa
- Location within Cornwall
- OS grid reference: SS255154
- Civil parish: Morwenstow
- Unitary authority: Cornwall
- Ceremonial county: Cornwall
- Region: South West
- Country: England
- Sovereign state: United Kingdom
- Post town: Bude
- Postcode district: EX23 9
- Police: Devon and Cornwall
- Fire: Cornwall
- Ambulance: South Western

Crimp (Cornish: Krympa, of unknown meaning) is a hamlet in the parish of Morwenstow, Cornwall, England.
