= Jean Hugard =

Australian magician

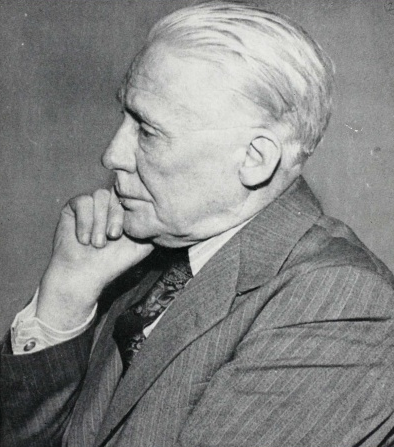
- Born: Jean Hugard; 4 December 1871; Toowoomba, Queensland, Australia
- Died: 14 August 1959 (aged 87)
- Occupation: Professional magician
- Known for: Card magic, sleight of hand

Jean Hugard (4 December 1871 – 14 August 1959) was an Australian professional magician and author, often co-writing with Frederick Braue. Among his better known works are the books The Royal Road to Card Magic, Encyclopedia of Card Tricks, and Expert Card Technique.

== History ==
Hugard was born John Gerard Rodney Boyce in Toowoomba, Queensland, Australia, the third son of John Alexander Boyce and Anne Brown. Educated at Toowoomba Grammar School, later he joined the staff of the Queensland National bank. After a late start and from a completely non-theatrical background he rose to become one of the world's great stage magicians, often dubbed the Dean of Magicians, and the last of a trio (Robert-Houdin, Hoffman, Hugard) of famed authors on the art of legerdemain.

Over the course of his life, he performed as Oscar Kellmann, Chin Sun Loo, Ching Ling Foo, and Jean Hugarde. He was inspired in 1880 by seeing a Haselmayer show. He eventually began his professional career in 1896.

In 1898, Gerard left the bank, and with several partners founded Burketown's Endeavour Meatworks (producing tinned beef) to solve the problem of getting Gulf Country cattle to market. The venture was a roaring success for several years, however drought, economic recession and some lack of expertise in the art of tinning ruined the meatworks venture, and Gerard returned to Toowoomba to a series of temporary jobs, including a stint as secretary of the Toowoomba General Hospital. In that capacity he organised entertainments to raise funds, including himself on the bill as an increasingly expert conjurer.

He left his wife, Margaret Annie Griffiths, and at least two sons, Leslie and Colin, to move to the U.S. in 1916. He worked in vaudeville from 1916 until 1918. One of his feature attractions then was "Birth of the Sea Nymph."

One of his full evening shows presented on tour in Australia and New Zealand was a silent Chinese act. He also was known for his bullet catch routine he called "The Great Rifle Feat". He was the first to present it with modern-day guns at the time.

He owned and performed in a magic theater in Luna Park (at Coney Island) from 1919–1929. He also appeared in a Broadway Show in 1928 at the Forrest Theater called "The Squealer."

When he retired from performing, he moved to Brooklyn to write and edit magic publications. He wrote more than 30 books on magic. Upon the death of John Northern Hilliard, who had written about 50 percent of his book Greater Magic, a lot of manuscript was left to be completed. Carl Waring Jones, who had contracted for its publication, hired Jean Hugard in 1938 to complete and enlarge the text to over 1,000 pages. The book went on to become a standard textbook of magic, which author Henry Hay called "one of the best and largest books ever written about magic."

He was editor of Hugard's Magic Monthly starting in 1943. He was also named the fourth ever Society of American Magicians, Dean of Magicians in 1951. Near the end of his life, Hugard was blind, having lost the sight of both eyes following operations for the removal of cataracts. In spite of this handicap he continued to work in the magic field at his home in Brooklyn, NY.

He died in the United States in 1959 at the age of 87 and was known far and wide as The Great Hugard. The New York Herald Tribune published a double-column obituary with photograph – the sort of space usually reserved for statesman or movie stars.

== Publications ==
- Card Manipulations N° 1 & 2 (1933)
- Card Manipulations N° 3 (1934)
- Card Manipulations N° 4 (1935)
- Mental Magic with Cards (1935)
- Coin Magic (1935)
- Card Manipulations N° 5 (1936)
- Thimble Magic (1936)
- Encyclopedia of Card Tricks (1937) (editor; with J. J. Crimmins)
- Money Magic (1937)
- Silken Sorcery (1937)
- Close-up Magic (1938)
- More Card Manipulations N° 1 (1938)
- More Card Manipulations N° 2 (1939)
- Modern Magic Manual (1939) (introduction by Julien Proskauer)
- More Card Manipulations N° 3 (1940)
- More Card Manipulations N° 4 (1941)
- Sealed Mysteries of Pocket Magic (1943)
- Expert Card Technique (1940) (with Frederick Braue)
- The Stripper Deck - Miracle Methods No. 1 (1941) (with Frederick Braue)
- Miracle Shuffles and Tricks - Miracle Methods No. 2 (1942) (with Frederick Braue)
- Prepared Cards and Accessories - Miracle Methods No. 3 (1942) (with Frederick Braue)
- Tricks and Sleights - Miracle Methods No. 4 (1943) (with Frederick Braue)
- The Invisible Pass (1946) (with Frederick Braue)
- Show Stoppers with Cards (1948) (with Frederick Braue)
- Royal Road to Card Magic (1948) (with Frederick Braue)
- Houdini's "Unmasking": Fact Vs. Fiction (1957)

Biographies

- Alfredson, James (1997). Jean Hugard. David Meyer Magic Books. ISBN 0-916638-84-7. (1997) - Looks at the life and career of an accomplished magician who worked during the 1930s and 1940s, and his influence on the performance of magic during his day.

== Awards and honors ==
- Selected to the Society of American Magicians Hall of Fame.
- Magic Circle's highest award, the Silver Wand
- "Milbourne Christopher Award," a plaque that Walt Rollins gave each year in the memory of his son Chipper, to the magician who has done most in the advancement of "brotherly love."
- International Brotherhood of Magicians Ring 136 (Brisbane, Australia) is named in his honor.
- International Brotherhood of Magicians honorary life member

== See also ==
- List of magicians
