= Herrmann pass =

A visual Herrmann pass

The Herrmann pass (or Herrmann shift) is a sleight of hand move used to either get a chosen card to the top of the deck, or to nullify a cut. This style of the move is different from the classic pass.

The sleight is named after Alexander Herrmann or his brother Compars (Carl) Herrmann. The Herrmann pass was first published in Hermann's book New Era Card Tricks.

The Herrmann pass differs from the classic pass in that the bottom packet is shifted to the top. There are numerous variations of this pass, including the invisible turnover pass (also known as the midnight shift), published in 1940 by Jean Hugard, and the spread pass, published in 1967 by Lewis Ganson.

According to Austrian magician Magic Christian, author of Non Plus Ulta — Hofzinser's Card Artistry, the Herrmann pass was in fact invented by Johann Nepomuk Hofzinser: "It is hoped that, after the publication of this book, the Herrmann pass will come to be correctly known as the Hofzinser pass."
