= Karl Fulves =

American magician

- Born: Carl Anthony Fulves; 27 July 1938; New Rochelle, NY, U.S.
- Died: 16 February 2023 (aged 83); Hackensack, NJ, U.S.
- Occupations: magician, author, publisher
- Known for: Card magic, self-working tricks

Carl Anthony Fulves (pronounced FUL-ves), known as Karl Fulves (27 July 1938 – 16 February 2023) was an American magician and author and editor of publications on magic, including the Pallbearers Review, a series of books on sleight of hand and close-up magic.

== Early life ==
Fulves was born in New Rochelle, NY on July 27, 1938. He graduated from New Rochelle High School in 1956 and attended Rensselaer Polytechnic Institute in Troy, NY where he studied electrical engineering.

== Career ==
Fulves worked as an electrical engineer for several years starting around 1960 while simultaneously publishing in the field of magic. From 1982 until nearly the end of his life he worked as an administrative assistant in the medical services field in New Jersey.

Although his innovations in the field of magic and his prolific writing were initially almost entirely self-published, he achieved mainstream success starting in 1976 with the first of a long series of books published by Dover Books, and followed in 1977 by The Magic Book from Random house. The publicity program for The Magic Book featured appearances on the Merv Griffin, Mike Douglas, and Dick Cavett television shows – among his few known public performances.

=== Self-working magic series ===
Fulves is most well known for a series of ten short books about self-working magic published from 1976 to 1995 by Dover Publications and illustrated with line art by Joseph K. Schmidt. The first, Self-Working Card Tricks, detailed 72 magic tricks using standard playing cards and intended for amateur magicians without the need to perform sleight of hand. Most of the tricks involve the mathematical properties of a standard deck or glimpsing a "Key Card" at the start of a trick that follows the spectator's card throughout the deck's manipulation.

The first follow-up was published in 1979 as Self-Working Mental Magic, featuring 67 mind-reading tricks. Volumes on table magic and number magic were published in 1981 and 1982. A direct continuation of the series’ first entry was published in 1984 under the title More Self-Working Card Tricks. An entry on paper magic followed in 1985.

== Periodicals ==
Fulves published many periodicals over the years including Charlatan, Underworld accompanied by Fine Print, Interlocutor, and Midnight Magic Monthly.

List of periodicals published by Karl Fulves:

Alfredson/Daily - Fernandes numbers, titles, year of publication and number of issues in a complete file:

- 5510...Pallbearers Review, original series, ?–1965, 22 issues
- 5515...Pallbearers Review, 1965–1975, 120 issues
- 58955..Rigmarole, 1993–1994, 10 issues
- 6055...S-C, 1985, 7 issues
- 65703..Swindle Sheet, 1990–1992, 10 issues
- 69206..Underworld, 1995–1999, 10 issues
- 69800..Verbatim, 1993–1994, 10 issues

Karl Fulves' current publications, started in 1999, are Discoverie, Charlatan and Latter Day Secrets.

== Published works ==
Title	Year	Pages
M	1994	?
Binary Count Notes	1969	?
Blocking Off	?	?
Bob Hummer's Collected Secrets	1980	106
Bob Ostin's New Submarine Card	1983	40
Calculator Tricks	1998	130
Card Counting	1982	48
Card Under Glass	1979	24
Cards #1 Four-card Brainwave	1978	20
Cards #2 51 Faces North	1978	24
Cards #3 Interlock	1980	72
Cards #4 Side Steal	1981	60
Cards #5 The Multiple Shift	1989	48
C	1998	55
Combo II	?	?
Command Colors	1997	22
Contemporary Handkerchief Magic, part 1	1987	30
Contemporary Handkerchief Magic, part 2	1987	28
Contemporary Rope Magic, part 1	1986	28
Contemporary Rope Magic, part 2	1986	28
Contemporary Rope Magic, part 3	1986	28
Covenant	1987	29
Crooked Tales	1994	129
Cryptology	1979	24
Curioser	1980	61
Deceptive Practices	1992	83
Deceptive Practices, Supplement	1992	28
Downs on Malini	?	11
NSOM : Dr Ken Krenzel's Incredible Card Tunnel	1975	6
Easy to do card tricks for children	1989	47
Easy to do magic tricks for children	1974	90
Epilogue	1993	312
Faro and riffle technique	1976	90
Faro and riffle techniques	1969	46
Faro and riffle technique; Supplement 1	1970	10
Faro and riffle technique; Supplement 2	1970	?
Faro and riffle technique; Supplement 3	1970	?
Faro possibilities	1967	?
Faro possibilities	1979	36
Four color problems	1979	24
Fourcast	1981	36
Fr Cyprian's TV card rise	1982	40
Gambler's third lesson	1979	16
Gene Finnell's card magic	1973	76
Hardcore aces	1983	12
History of the brainwave principle	1983	100
Hocus Poker Fulves	1982	
Hofzinser's Card Tricks	?	?
Hofzinser Notebook	2003	87
Impromptu holdouts	1977	50
Impromptu Opener	1979	8
Inner sanctum	1979	48
Jack in the Box	1979	24
Jacob Daley's Notebooks (transcr. Csuri)	1975	194
Kaleidoscope Rope	1989	50
Kannibal Kards	1975	8
NSOM : Karl Fulves Technicolor Cards	1974	6
Magic Book	1977	195
Methods with Cards, part 1	1975	80
Methods with Cards, part 2	1975	80
Methods with Cards, part 3	1975	80
Mexican Monte	1972	32
Millennium Aces	1981	92
Money Moves	1989	34
More Self-working Card Tricks	1984	136
Mutus Nomen	1988	?
Neale's Trapdoor Card	1983	12
New Card Rises	1996	62
Notes from the Underground	1973	61
Nyria Effect	1979	24
Octet	1981	76
Origins	1981	56
Packet Switches (part I)	1976	56
Packet Switches (part II)	1973	56
Packet Switches (part III, Harvey Rosenthal)	1977	76
Packet Switches (part IV Gene Maze)	1977	72
Packet Switches (part V Gene Maze)	1977	70
Pallbearers Review volume 1-4	1993	290
Pallbearers Review volume 5-8	1993	390
Pallbearers Review volume 9-12	1993	380
Parallel Lines	1980	40
Principles of Riffle Shuffle Set-ups	1968	30
Prolix		
Prototype	1989	50
Punch out Puzzle Kit	1982	24
Quick Card Tricks	1989	50
Riffle Shuffle Control	1979	23
Riffle Shuffle Methods	1987	49
Riffle Shuffle Set-ups	1973	98
Riffle Shuffle Set-ups	1976	98
Riffle Shuffle Technique Preliminaries, Notes, Problems	1971	22
Riffle Shuffle Technique Preliminary Notes, part 1	1972	22
Riffle Shuffle Technique, part 1	1975	12
Riffle Shuffle Technique Preliminary Notes, part 2	1973	60
Riffle Shuffle Technique, part 2	1975	10
Riffle Shuffle Technique, part 3	1984	92
S-C contemporary money magic no 1, Robert E Neale's short change wallet	1985	21
S-C contemporary money magic no 2, Max Londono's After max	1985	16
S-C contemporary money magic no 3, Harvey Rosenthal's two and two	1985	16
S-C contemporary money magic no 4, Howard Wurst's paper money	1985	16
S-C contemporary money magic no 5, Robert E. Neale's bill tube	1985	16
S-C contemporary money magic no 6, Howard Wurst's simplex switch	1985	16
S-C contemporary money magic no 7, Nick van Selter's one hand turnover	1985	16
Secret Session, part one	1987	29
Secret Session, part two	1987	28
Secret Session, part three	1987	28
Self-working Card Tricks	1976	113
Self-working Close-up Card Magic	1995	120
Self-working Coin Magic	1989	136
Self-working Handkerchief Magic	1989	184
Self-working Mental Magic	1979	121
Self-working Number Magic	1982	145
Self-working Paper Magic	1985	147
Self-working Rope Magic	1990	148
Self-working Table Magic	1981	122
Setting up Exercises	1995	111
Shape Changers	1979	44
Shuffle off	1983	12
Six Impromptu Card Tricks	1982	48
Swindle & Cheat - a collection of nontransitive games	1991	71
Teleportation Notes	1969	8
Teleportation Notes	1979	24
The Best of Slydini and More, vol 1 (text)	1976	108
The Best of Slydini and More, vol 2 (photos)	1976	126
The Book of Numbers	1971	47
The Book of Numbers, Supplementary Notes	1971	19
The Children's Magic Kit	1980	16+16
The Magic of Slydini and More, vol 1 (text)	1976	108
The Magic of Slydini and More, vol 2 (photos)	1976	126
The Magical World of Slydini, vol 1 (text)	1979	101
The Magical World of Slydini, vol 2 (photos)	1979	176
The Return Trip	1986	39
The Shamrock Code & the Parallel Principle	1979	48
Topological False Count	1979	18
Transpo Trix	1978	80
Trick with Dice	1970	?
Vampire Chronicles	1997	92
Vampire Papers	1997	45
When Psychics Play Poker	?	?
Wireless II	1982	48
Word Play	?	?
Worknotes on Brainwave	1983	20

Fulves wrote the text for a number of the Stars of Magic manuscripts, including Chris Capehart's 3-Ring Routine, Joe de Stefano's Chinatown Poker, Max Londono's Eternal String, Metalogic (Fred Baumann) and David Roth Okito Box routine.

== Death ==
On November 3, 2023, Fulves's son Ben posted on Genii Forum that his father had died on 16 February 2023.

== See also ==
- List of magicians
- Card magic
- Coin magic
- sleight of hand
