= The Expert at the Card Table =

Book by S. W. Erdnase

The Expert at the Card Table: The Classic Treatise on Card Manipulation
- Cover of the 1995 edition.
- Author: S. W. Erdnase
- Illustrator: Smith, M. D.
- Cover artist: Ed Smith Design
- Language: English
- Subject: Sleight of hand
- Genre: Non-Fiction
- Publisher: Original Unknown
- Publication date: 1902 (first edition)
- Publication place: USA
- ISBN: 978-0-486-28597-9

The Expert at the Card Table, is an extensive book on the art of sleight of hand published in 1902 by S. W. Erdnase, a pseudonymous author whose identity has remained a mystery for over a century. As a detailed manual of card sharps, the book is considered to be one of the most influential works on magic or conjuring with cards.

== Description of the book ==
The Expert at the Card Table covers the art of card manipulation and sleight of hand at gambling tables. It was written, according to its author, because "if it sells it will accomplish the primary motive of the author, as he needs the money". Martin Gardner described the book as "the most famous, the most carefully studied book ever published on the art of manipulating cards at gaming tables". Similarly, David Copperfield described it as "a detailed description of the sleight of hand used by crooked gamblers and card magicians. With discussion of everything from false shuffles to fake cuts, dodgy dealing to secret palming, it was the ultimate instructional manual on how to cheat".

Despite his widespread influence on the magician community, the author's identity remains an unsolved mystery. The book may have been published under an assumed name given that it was illegal to distribute books on crooked gambling in the early 1900s. It was noted early on that S.W. Erdnase spelled backwards is E.S. Andrews. (See Gardner's Foreword, pp. vii-ix.) This led to speculation that Andrews was the author's surname. Martin Gardner, Burt Whaley and Jeff Busby tracked down the original illustrator and used information provided to conclude that Erdnase was Milton Franklin Andrews, a gambler who had died in murder-suicide in 1905, which explained the copyright not being renewed. Another theory is that the author is Wilbur E. Sanders, son of Senator Wilbur F. Sanders. W.E. Sanders is an anagram of S. W. Erdnase, and Sanders had the education, knowledge of magic, and familiarity with gambling necessary to write the book. According to David Copperfield, "[t]he pursuit of Erdnase has dominated the lives of many magicians and has led them to spend thousands of hours searching public records, newspaper articles, genealogical archives, bankruptcy files, image banks, magic books, yearbooks, census documents, and local libraries".

Originally the author started selling the book for $2.00 in 1902 and the next year it dropped to $1.00. Although the author did not renew the copyright, the book has remained in print since 1902, albeit small private printings on occasion. First editions are "highly sought after by collectors", and David Copperfield has a copy in his private museum.

== Legacy ==
Dai Vernon is credited with popularizing this influential text in the community of professional magicians. Well past ninety years of age, Vernon was fond of quoting from it, with page numbers, when discussing card techniques with his colleagues at the Magic Castle. In Expert Card Technique, Jean Hugard said of it, "... perhaps no other book in all the list of conjuring books has been so avidly read, so affectionately regarded." Erdnase's glossary of terms was in itself extremely influential, and has been reproduced more or less directly by numerous authors, including Hugard, and Henry Hay.

The influence of this book is such that it has been issued in annotated form; translated into Japanese, German, Spanish, French, Italian, Russian, and Korean; and issued as a series of DVDs by a professional magician, demonstrating and explaining Erdnase's techniques and methods. A featured show of the story of Expert of the Card Table is also performed regularly by UK magician Guy Hollingworth.

== Adaptations ==
In 2008, a one-man play inspired by The Expert at the Card Table, starring Guy Hollingworth and directed by Neil Patrick Harris, was performed at the Edinburgh Fringe Festival. The play was successful and in subsequent years was performed in London and the United States.
