= Ambitious Card =

Magic effect

The Ambitious Card, or Elevator Card, is a magic effect in which a playing card seems to return to the top of the deck after being placed elsewhere in the middle of the deck. This is a classic effect in card magic and serves as a study subject for students of magic. It is also known as the "Trick that Fooled Houdini", as Harry Houdini was unable to determine how a variation of the trick was done when it was performed for him, multiple times, by Dai Vernon. Most performing card magicians will have developed their own personal Ambitious Card routine.

The effect is often credited to French magician Gustav Alberti, in the mid-19th century. However, there is a related idea in Jean Nicholas Ponsin's Nouvelle Magie Blanche Devoilée, published in 1854, that might precede that. Many magicians base their routine on Darryl Martinez's version, as he issued a comprehensive VHS tape on many variations of accomplishing this effect.

== Effect ==
The magician usually gets a card signed by an audience member and inserts it into the middle of the deck, after which it reappears at the top. This is repeated under more and more improbable conditions, sometimes to humorous effect.

== Methods ==
There are many methods for accomplishing the basic effect. These are often based on sleight of hand methods such as the double lift; however, gimmicks can also be used, such as a stripper deck. More detailed descriptions can be found in books such as The Royal Road to Card Magic, The Expert at the Card Table and Card College. Many magicians have come up with their own methods and routines. Dai Vernon's Ambitious Card routine, for example, can be found in the book Stars of Magic.

== Variations ==
Variations to this trick can be linked together to create routines. Many magicians perform the same routine every time, though the trick is structured such that one is able to combine variations in different ways for each performance. This is one factor which has earned the Ambitious Card the status of a classic effect.

Variations of this effect include:

- The magician has the spectator sign the card to prove there is no duplicate.
- The spectator is handed the "ambitious card" and asked to put it in the middle, then asked to hold the deck and do some type of magic move, essentially calling the card to the top of the deck himself.
- The spectator marks an X on the back of an indifferent card at the top of the deck, only to see the same X appear on the back of the "ambitious card" after it has risen to the top.
- The "ambitious card" is bent so that it is seen to be physically different from all the other cards, making it clear that it is placed into the middle of the deck, and increasing the amazement of the spectator as it is seen to rise to the top.
- It is told that the "ambitious card" has a connection with the spectator and is shown to come to the top only when spectator commands.

Some variations include an ending to the ambitious card routine, such as a card to shoe, or a card to wallet.
