= Si Stebbins stack =

Cyclic card stack used in magic tricks

The Si Stebbins stack is a cyclic mathematical card stack. It was popularized by the magician Si Stebbins, and can be constructed from a standard 52-card deck. Frequently used in card magic, its properties allow the position and value of each card in a deck to be determined.

== Order of stack ==
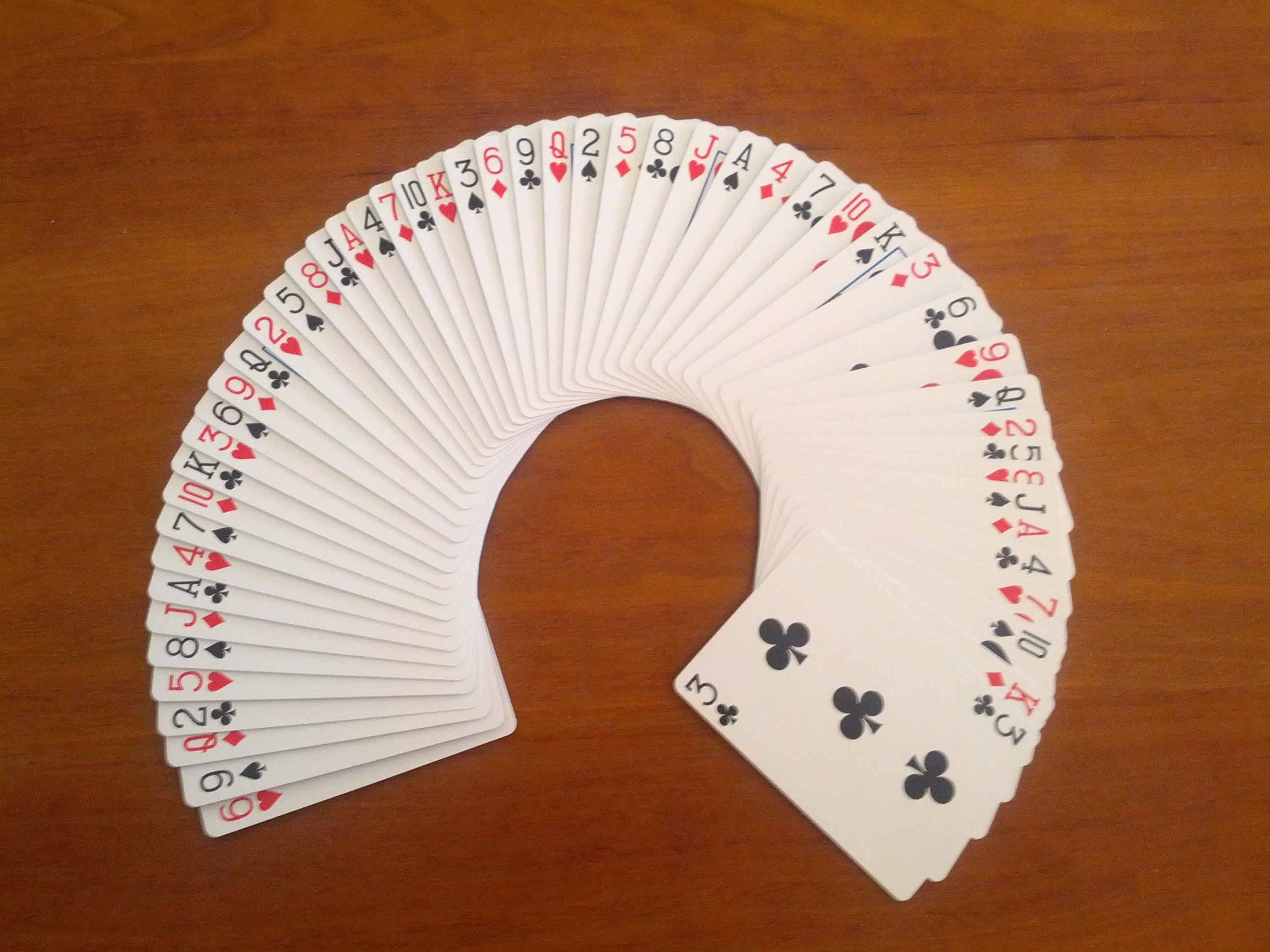
A deck of cards arranged in Si Stebbins order

Each card in a Si Stebbins stack alternates suit in the CHaSeD order (Clubs Hearts Spades Diamonds), and has a numerical value three greater than the preceding card. The Aces are given the numerical value of 1 and the Jack, Queen, and King of each suit are given the values 11, 12, and 13 respectively.

For instance, in a deck in Si Stebbins order, A♣ is followed by the 4♥, 7♠, 10♦, and K♣.

The deck stack is considered cyclic as any card in the deck can be used to determine the value and position of any other card in the deck. The bottom card of the deck is in order with the top card of the deck making the order of cards an endlessly repeating cycle. A deck in Si Stebbins order can be cut any number of times without disturbing the order.

== Arranging a deck in Si Stebbins order ==
The arrangement can be started at any card. In the pamphlet Card Tricks And The Way They Are Performed Stebbins recommends starting with the 6♥. But here we start with A♣ and arrange the deck in the following order reading from top left to bottom right:

Clubs	Hearts	Spades	Diamonds
Ace	4	7	10
King	3	6	9
Queen	2	5	8
Jack	Ace	4	7
10	King	3	6
9	Queen	2	5
8	Jack	Ace	4
7	10	King	3
6	9	Queen	2
5	8	Jack	Ace
4	7	10	King
3	6	9	Queen
2	5	8	Jack

== Using the stack to determine a selected card ==
The value of a card selected from a deck in Si Stebbins order can be determined by the card immediately preceding or following it.

In Card Tricks And The Way They Are Performed Stebbins instructs the performer to have a card selected and cut the cards above the selection to the bottom of the deck. Then, by looking at the bottom card, the spectator's selection can be revealed.

For instance, if the card on the bottom is the 9♦, the performer will add three to the numeric value making 12 (Queen) and move to the next suit in the order (Clubs). The selected card is the Q♣.

== History ==
Mathematical card stacks in which each card's value progresses by 3, 4, or 5 are detailed in magic literature as early as the 16th Century.

The system was originally published in the United States in Boston or New York City around 1898 by Si Stebbins (real name William Coffrin), in a pamphlet titled Si Stebbins' Card Tricks And The Way He Performs Them and a later edition Card Tricks And The Way They Are Performed.

Despite contrary claims, Stebbins maintained that the stack was his invention:

...I am the ORIGINATOR of this system for doing these tricks, and the first Vaudeville Artist to present them in the better class theaters of the United States.

In fact, the first time they were ever presented to an American vaudeville audience was by myself, at the Columbia Theater, St. Louis, Mo., during the season of 1898-9, and on the Keith and Orpheum Circuits the season of 1900.

I am printing this statement to refute the claims of a few would-be imitators.

— Si Stebbins, Card Tricks And The Way They Are Performed. p.9

Howard Thurston claimed to have invented the system in his 1903 book Howard Thurston's Card Tricks referring to it as "The 'Thurston' System of Expert Card Manipulation" and thanking Stebbins "...for many valuable suggestions and ideas with regard to its conception."

The card stack is generally known as Si Stebbins today, and is referred to as such in many card magic books including The Encyclopedia of Card Tricks and Expert Card Technique.
