= Crimp (gambling) =

Card bend to facilitate cheating

In gambling terminology a crimp is a bend that has been intentionally made on the corner(s) of a playing card to facilitate identification.

A card cheat will typically bend some of the important cards during the game. Below are just several of the most popular examples.

In poker, for instance, a cheat may crimp one of the cards to mark off the exact location where he wishes his secret conspirator to cut the deck. Similarly, if the card cheat is not working with a confederate, he may bend one or more cards to force a cut upon an unsuspecting victim. In either case the deck will most likely be cut at the exact predetermined spot in the same way an old book always tends to open at the same page.

Another poker scenario (also popular in numerous other games) is to crimp some of the high-value cards during the early rounds. On subsequent rounds the cheat will be able to identify some of those cards during the deal. This enables the cheat to employ a second deal and deal some of those cards to the desired hand, or simply to identify some of the cards held by other players. In any event, the cheat has a mathematical edge over the other players.

In casino blackjack a crossroader may crimp all the 10-value cards. this will enable the cheat to sometimes identify the dealer's hole card (the dealer has one card face up, called the up card, and one card face down, called the hole card). In those instances the cheat(s) will know the dealer's total and play their hand(s) accordingly. Professional card counters and cheaters know that security is on the lookout for “cheating tells” - special behaviors which casinos train security to spot.
