= S. W. Erdnase =

American magician and writer

S. W. Erdnase is a pseudonym used by the author of The Expert at the Card Table, a book detailing sleight of hand, cheating and legerdemain using playing cards. Still considered essential reading for any card magician, the book (usually known as just Erdnase, Expert, EATCT, or sometimes the Bible) has been in publication since 1902. Erdnase's true identity is one of the enduring mysteries of the magic community.

When spelled backwards the pseudonym reads "E. S. Andrews", misleading many early investigators to search for people named Andrews as possible candidates.

== Possible identities ==
=== Milton Franklin Andrews ===
Martin Gardner has proposed that a small-time con man named Milton Franklin Andrews was the author. Another proponent who researched this theory was Barton Whaley, in his book The Man Who Was Erdnase, which contains eyewitness interviews from the 1940s. Andrews was wanted by police for questioning in relation to a murder inquiry. When the police found Andrews he shot himself dead after fatally shooting his female companion. Andrews was only 33, as stated in The Man Who was Erdnase.

Others argue against Andrews being Erdnase because the known examples of his writing are very much inferior to the exceptional writing of The Expert at the Card Table.

There has been newer evidence since the year 2000 that puts to rest the assumption that Milton Franklin Andrews was Erdnase. It is obvious that Andrews was a card cheat but that is as far as his connection goes. Other historians have also found other men that could have indeed been S.W. Erdnase.

=== Wilbur Edgerton Sanders ===
Some argue that Erdnase was probably a well-educated, locally prominent individual, hiding behind an alias to protect his social standing. The late David Alexander, a magician and private detective, did quite a bit of work to find a better and more possible candidate than Milton Franklin Andrews, and he proposed that Erdnase was a prominent mining engineer named Wilbur Edgerton Sanders; "S. W. Erdnase" is an anagram of "W. E. Sanders".

Since Alexander's death, others have researched Wilbur Edgerton Sanders. Genii Magazine devoted a large portion of its September 2011 issue to an exploration of Alexander's theory, providing substantial circumstantial evidence that links Sanders to Erdnase.

=== Edward Gallaway ===
Chris Wasshuber has identified the printer and circus performer (door talker, Punch and Judy, magic) Edward Gallaway as an extraordinary good match for Erdnase. Edward Gallaway worked at the time at the printer, James McKinney, the book was printed at. Later Gallaway published other books in remarkable similar fashion (self-published, copyright registered, contact address given as place of work, and price printed on the title page). A forensic linguistic analysis by Dr. John Olsson confirmed that the writing style of Gallaway and Erdnase are a very good match, and in particular a much better match than other possible candidates such as Wilbur Edgerton Sanders. Gallaway also matches the physical description provided by the illustrator M. D. Smith (identified and interviewed by Martin Gardner in 1947).

=== E. S. Andrews ===
Todd Karr has identified a Midwestern-based con artist and business swindler named E. S. Andrews who was active around the turn of the century and whose biography and range of known locations seems to fit Erdnase's. Also, E.S. Andrews spelled backwards is S.W. Erdnase.

=== L'Homme Masqué ===
Juan Tamariz has the hypothesis that Erdnase was written by the 19th century Peruvian magician "L'Homme Masqué" (The Masked Man), who lived in Europe and is considered one of the greatest magicians in history, even Dai Vernon himself considers him among the three greatest. During the 9th Congress of the Latin American Federation of Magic Societies (FLASOMA 2009) held in Peru, he explained the reasons and grounds for which the author of Erdnase has to be L'Homme Masqué. During the explanation of this theory Gaetan Bloom was present, supporting this hypothesis.

=== Others ===
Many other people have also been proposed, including James Andrews, James DeWitt Andrews, Robert Frederick Foster and Herbert Lee Andrews, which have been discussed and debated on the Erdnase topic on the Genii magazine forum since 2003. Edwin Sumner Andrews was explored by Richard Hatch.

== Bibliography ==
- Erdnase, S. W. (1995) [1902]. The Expert at the Card Table: The Classic Treatise on Card Manipulation. Dover Publications. ISBN 0-486-28597-9. "Newly typeset edition with an historical introduction by Martin Gardner"
- McDermott, Hurt (2012). Artifice, Ruse & Erdnase: The Search for One Who May Not Want to Be Found. Vol. 1. Somerville, MA.
- Madison, Daniel (2012). The Expert At The Card Table Madison Edition, Daniel Madison & Erdnase: The 2018 Madison Edition of The Expert At The Card Table. Vol. 1. UK, MA.
