= Dai Vernon =

Canadian magician (1894–1992)

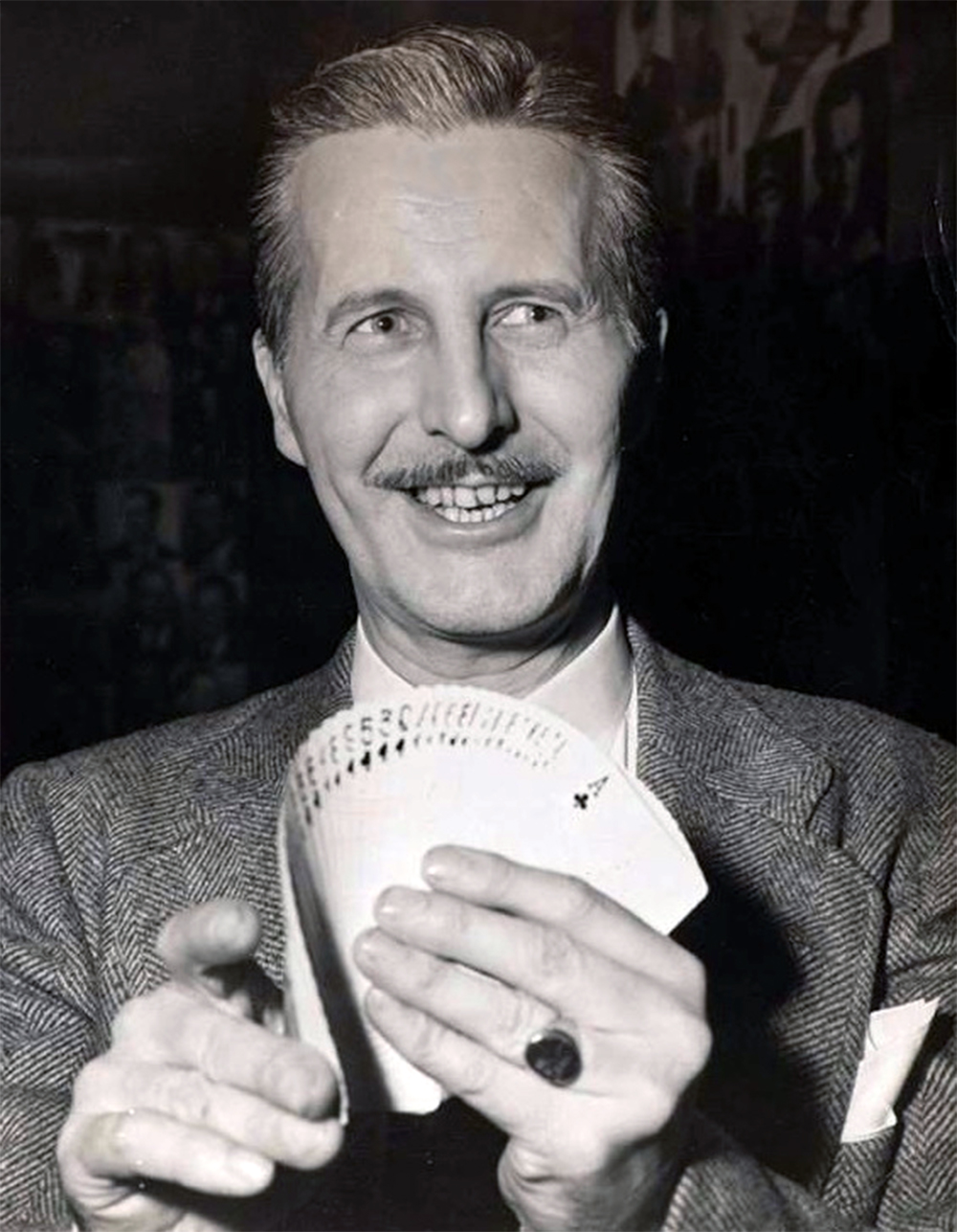
- Vernon using the pressure fan
- Born: David Frederick Wingfield Verner; June 11, 1894; Ottawa, Ontario, Canada
- Died: August 21, 1992 (aged 98); Ramona, California, U.S.
- Other name: The Professor
- Education: Royal Military College of Canada
- Occupations: Magician, author, silhouettist
- Employer: Magic Castle
- Spouse: Eugenie "Jeanne" Hayes (m. 1924)
- Children: 2

David Frederick Wingfield Verner (June 11, 1894 – August 21, 1992), better known by his stage names Dai Vernon (Note: His stage name "Dai" was pronounced as "die" or alternatively as "day" (as in David).) or The Professor, was a Canadian magician.

Vernon's sleight of hand technique and knowledge, particularly with card tricks and close-up magic, garnered him respect among fellow magicians, and he was a mentor to them.

From 1963, he worked at and lived out his last decades at the Magic Castle, an exclusive specialty nightclub in Hollywood, Los Angeles, California. Vernon retired officially from performing in 1990 at the age of 96.

== Early life ==
Vernon was born in Ottawa, Canada, as David Frederick Wingfield Verner. While performing, he often mentioned that he had learned his first trick from his father at age seven, adding wryly that he had "wasted the first six years" of his life. His father was a government worker and an amateur magician.

Vernon studied mechanical engineering at the Royal Military College of Canada in Kingston, Ontario, but by World War I he had moved to New York City.

Vernon first fell in love with magic when he was seven years old after his father took him to see a magic show. The first real magic book Vernon owned was an early edition of The Expert at the Card Table, by S. W. Erdnase. By the time he was 13, Vernon had memorized the contents of the book. He also had an encounter with another up-and-coming young magician from his town, Cliff Green, who asked Vernon, "What kind of magic do you do?" Vernon responded by asking Green to name a card. Upon pulling a pack of cards from his pocket, Vernon turned over the top card of the deck to reveal the named card and replied to Green "That's the kind of magic I do. What kind of magic do you do?"

As a young man, Vernon moved to New York City where, in the back room of Clyde Powers's magic shop, he found favor among other magicians of the era, including Dr. James William Elliott, Nate Leipzig, and Harry Kellar.

He began to use the first name "Dai" after a newspaper used the abbreviation in place of "David"; the paper was using the Welsh nickname for David. When Verner first moved to the United States, the male member of a popular ice-skating pair had the surname Vernon; Americans continually mistook Verner's last name to be the same as the popular ice skater, and eventually, the magician became fed up with correcting people and simply adopted "Vernon" as well.

== Career ==
Owing to his knowledge of, and skill at, sleight of hand, Vernon has long been affectionately known as The Professor. Harry Houdini (who in his early years billed himself as "The King of Kards") often boasted that if he saw a card trick performed three times in a row he would be able to figure it out. Vernon then showed Houdini a trick (later known as the Ambitious Card) where he removed the top card of the deck and placed it second from the top, then turned over the top card to again reveal the original card. Houdini watched Vernon do the trick seven times (some versions of the story say five times), each time insisting that Vernon "do it again." Finally, Houdini's wife and Vernon's friends said, "Face it, Houdini, you're fooled." For years afterward, Vernon used the title The Man Who Fooled Houdini in his advertisements.

Vernon sought out crooked gamblers and card cheaters for close-up magic ideas.

Though respected by professional magicians nationwide due in part to publicity via the magazine The Sphinx, Vernon was essentially a gifted amateur until his 40s. Before the Magic Castle, Vernon never held a steady full-time job for more than a few months. He occasionally performed magic at nightclubs or on cruise ships to South America and back, and also toured the Philippines as an entertainer during World War II with the United Service Organizations (USO). His engineering degree was put to use as a sometime blueprint reader.

Vernon's main source of income was cutting custom silhouette portraits, a talent that paid 25 to 50 cents per silhouette for about two minutes of work during the 1920s and the 1930s—compare with the first U.S. minimum wage of 25 cents per hour in 1938 ($5.72 in 2025). He had a friendly relationship with fellow Coney Island silhouettist E. J. Perry. A few hours a week cutting silhouettes was generally enough to support his family and finance his sleight of hand hobby. Vernon spent most of his early life traveling all over the United States looking for card cheats, and anyone who might know anything about sleight-of-hand with cards. He was famously under-credited for much of the work published in Jean Hugard and Frederick Braue's Expert Card Technique, though a later edition included an extra chapter that acknowledges Vernon's contributions. A huge portion of the sleight-of-hand had been discovered by Vernon over years of searching.

== Later years ==
Vernon spent the last 30 years of his life as Magician-in-Residence and the star attraction at the Magic Castle in Los Angeles, California. There, he mentored magicians including Ricky Jay, Persi Diaconis, Doug Henning, Larry Jennings, Bruce Cervon, Michael Ammar, John Carney and Richard Turner.

== Death ==
Vernon died on August 21, 1992, in Ramona, County of San Diego, California. According to biographer Karl Johnson, he was cremated and a box with his ashes was brought back to the Castle.

== Family ==
In 1924, Vernon married Eugenie "Jeanne" Hayes, a magician's assistant. They had two sons, Theodore and Derek. The two lived separately by the 1950s, though they never formally divorced.

== Books ==
Most books were edited by Lewis Ganson; some were written by Ganson.

- Dai Vernon's Book of Magic (1957)
- The Symphony of the Rings (1958)
- Inner Secrets of Card Magic (1959)
- More Inner Secrets of Card Magic (1960)
- Further Inner Secrets of Card Magic (1961)
- Malini & His Magic (1962)
- Early Vernon (1962)
- Dai Vernon's Tribute to Nate Leipzig (1963)
- Ultimate Secrets of Card Magic (1967)
- Dai Vernon's Expanded Lecture Notes (1970)
- Dai Vernon's Revelations (1984)
- Vernon Touch (2006)
- The Essential Dai Vernon (2009, collected work)

== Legacy ==
Among magicians, Vernon is credited with inventing or improving many standard close-up effects with cards, coins, and other small items. The "standard" cups and balls routine is his, and his 6-ring "Symphony of the Rings" remains one of the most popular Chinese linking rings routines in use to this day.

In June 2006, the first in-depth biography of Vernon was released by Squash Publishing entitled Dai Vernon: A Biography, *Artist * Magician * Muse (Vol. 1: 1894-1941) (first of planned two volumes) written by Canadian magician David Ben.

A 1999 documentary was released entitled Dai Vernon: The Spirit Of Magic.

The character of "The Professor" (played by Hal Holbrook) from the 2003 movie Shade was based on Dai Vernon, and the character Vernon (Stuart Townsend) was named after him.
