= Card manipulation =

Branch of magical illusion that deals with sleight of hand involving playing cards

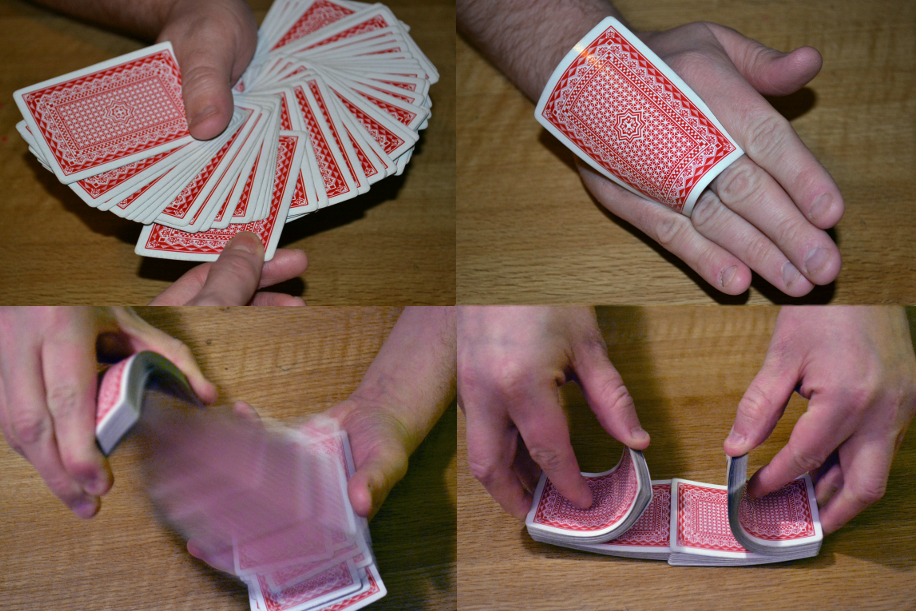
Card trick. Upper left: "Pick a card, any card". Upper right: Back-palming a card. Bottom left: A "spring" flourish. Bottom right: Mixing the cards (shuffling) allows for card trick preparation.

Card manipulation, commonly known as card magic, is the branch of magic that deals with creating effects using sleight of hand techniques involving playing cards. Card manipulation is often used in magical performances, especially in close-up, parlor, and street magic. Some of the most recognized names in this field include Dai Vernon, Tony Slydini, Juan Tamariz, Ed Marlo, S.W. Erdnase, Richard Turner, John Scarne, Ricky Jay and René Lavand. Before becoming world-famous for his escapes, Houdini billed himself as "The King of Cards". Among the more well-known card tricks relying on card manipulation are Ambitious Card, and Three-card Monte, a common street hustle also known as Find the Lady.

== History ==
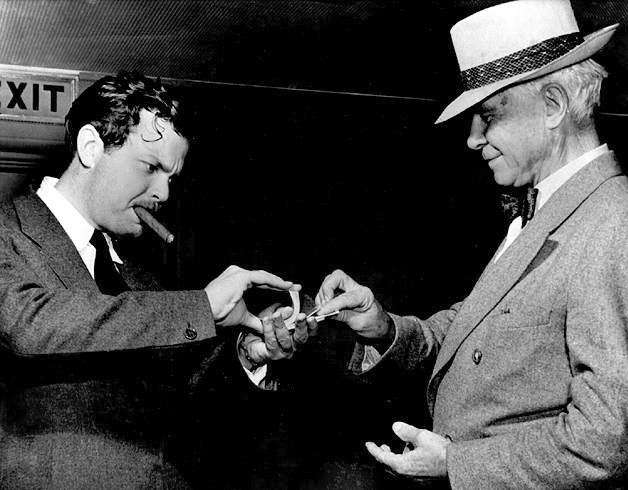
Orson Welles performs a card trick for Carl Sandburg (August 1942)

Playing cards became popular with magicians in the 15th century as they were props which were inexpensive, versatile, and easily accessible, plus sleight of hand with cards was already developed by card cheats. Card magic has bloomed into one of the most popular branches of magic, accumulating thousands of techniques and ideas. These range from complex mathematics like those used by Persi Diaconis, the use of psychological techniques like those taught by Banachek, to extremely difficult sleight of hand like that of Ed Marlo and Dai Vernon.

Card magic, in one form or another, likely dates from the time playing cards became commonly known, towards the second half of the fourteenth century, but its history in this period is largely undocumented. Compared to sleight of hand magic in general and to cups and balls, it is a new form of magic. However, due to its versatility as a prop it has become popular amongst modern magicians.

Martin Gardner called S.W. Erdnase's 1902 treatise on card manipulation Artifice, Ruse and Subterfuge at the Card Table: A Treatise on the Science and Art of Manipulating Cards "the most famous, the most carefully studied book ever published on the art of manipulating cards at gaming tables". This book influenced Dai Vernon to become a magician, who is considered to be the pioneer of modern day card magic.

== Technique ==
Illusions performed with playing cards are constructed using basic card manipulation techniques (or sleights). It is the intention of the performer that such sleights are performed in a manner which is undetectable to the audience—however, that result takes practice and a thorough understanding of method. Manipulation techniques include:

=== Lifts ===
Lifts are techniques which extract one or more cards from a deck. The produced card(s) are normally known to the audience, for example having previously been selected or identified as part of the illusion. In sleight of hand, a "double lift" can be made to extract two cards from the deck, but held together to appear as one card.

=== False deals ===
Dealing cards (for example at the start of a traditional card game) is considered a fair means of distributing cards. False deals are techniques which appear to deliver cards fairly, when actually the cards delivered are predetermined or known to the performer. False dealing techniques include: second dealing, bottom dealing, Greek dealing (a variation of the bottom deal), center dealing (rarely used), and double dealing (the top and bottom cards of a small packet are dealt together).

=== Side steal ===
A technique invented by magician F. W. Conradi. It is used to control a predetermined card to the top of a deck (most of the time) by utilizing the classic palm. There is also the diagonal palm shift, first published by S. W. Erdnase. Like the side steal, the diagonal palm shift utilizes the classic palm, but it is intended to control cards to the bottom of the deck, but it is commonly used to "teleport" a card to your pocket.

=== Passes ===
The effect of the card pass is that an identified card is inserted somewhere into a deck. However, following rapid and concealed manipulation by the performer, it is secretly moved or displaced - usually to the top (or bottom) of the deck. A pass is achieved by swapping the portion of the deck from the identified card downwards, with the portion of the deck above the identified card (cutting the deck secretly to control a certain card). Pass techniques include: the classic pass, the Zingone Perfect Table pass, the flesh grip pass, the jog pass, the Braue pass, the Charlier pass, the finger palm pass, the bluff pass and the Herrmann pass. Simply, a card pass is a secret cut of the deck (not to be confused with a coin pass which is a false transfer of a coin from one hand to the other).

=== Palming ===
Palming is a technique for holding or concealing one or more cards in the palm of the hand. Cards palmed from a deck are typically held in reserve (unseen by the audience) until production is required for the illusion being performed. Palming techniques include: the Braue diagonal tip-up, the swing, the thumb-count, face card palm, the crosswise, new vertical, the gamblers' squaring, the gamblers' flat, the Hugard top palm, the flip-over, the Hofzinser bottom, the Braue bottom, the Tenkai palm, the lateral palm, and the Zingone bottom.

=== False shuffles ===
Shuffling cards is considered a fair means to randomize the cards contained in a deck. False shuffles are techniques which appear to fairly shuffle a deck, when actually the cards in the deck are maintained in an order appropriate to the illusion being performed. False shuffles can be performed that permit one or more cards to be positioned in a deck, or even for the entire deck to remain in an unshuffled state (for example the state the deck was in before the shuffle). False shuffle techniques include: the perfect riffle (also known as the faro shuffle), the strip-out, the Hindu shuffle, the gamblers', the Zarrow shuffle, the push through riffle shuffle, and various stock shuffling techniques (where the locations of one or more cards are controlled during the false shuffle).

=== False cuts ===
Cutting a deck of cards is a technique whereby the deck is split into two portions (the split point being randomly determined – often by a member of the audience), which are then swapped – the effect being to make sure that no one is sure of which card is on the top of the deck. False cuts are techniques whereby the performer appears to organize a fair cut, when actually a predetermined card (or cards) is organized to be located on the top of the deck. False cutting techniques include: the false running cut, and the gambler's false cut.

=== Color change ===
A color change is the effect of changing one card to another in front of the spectator's eyes. Usually the cards changed are of different colors, or a face card into a number card, in order to make the change more apparent. There are many different techniques to accomplish this effect, but among the most common are the classic color change and the snap change, as they are easier to master than others. Professional magicians usually perform other color changes such as the Cardini or Erdnase change. Occasionally passes are used for color changes as well, mainly the classic pass.

=== Crimps ===
Crimps are techniques whereby part of a card is intentionally physically marked, creased, or bent to facilitate identification during an illusion. Crimp techniques include: the regular crimp, the gamblers' crimp, the breather crimp and the peek crimp.

=== Jogs ===
A jog is one or more cards which protrude slightly from somewhere within a deck or stack of cards. The protrusion, although not noticeable to the audience, permits the performer to retain knowledge about the location of the card during other manipulations, like the overhand shuffle. While jogs are not always hidden from the audience, they are most often. Some varieties include "in jogs", "side jogs", and "out jogs".

=== Reverses ===
Card reverses are techniques whereby one or more cards in a deck are made to change their orientation, for example from face up to face down. One common reverse is the half pass, which can reverse one or many cards hidden by the top of the deck.

=== Forces ===
Card forces are the sleight which involves forcing a spectator to choose a card that has been predetermined by the performer, while maintaining supposed free choice. Some forces include; the classic force, the riffle force, the dribble force, the slip force, and various forces incorporating card switches.

=== Switches ===
Card switches are used to switch out one or many cards. Switches are commonly used in teleporting card tricks. Switches include double lifts, the top change, and various forms of card mucking.

=== False counts ===
False counts are often used in magic tricks with a small amount of cards, most commonly 4 cards. False counts let you count a packet of cards while hiding cards, pretending there are more cards, or pretending there are less cards. The best known use of a false count is in Dai Vernon's twisting the aces, which uses Alex Elmsley's Elmsley count, also known as the ghost count. Another common false count is the Jordan count, which is very similar to the Elmsley count.

=== Misdirection ===
Misdirection, though not entirely specific to card magic, is indeed very prominent in most card performances. In many cases, the ‘skill’ of a card illusionist is determined by how well they can switch the audiences attention from one part of the performance to the next, which becomes more difficult when dealing with hecklers. Magicians can use card techniques like flourishing, verbal misdirection and by cracking jokes, in order to mislead the audience, making concealment of important sleight of hand easier in the process.

== Important figures ==
=== Modern day ===
Jason Ladanye is one of the most popular magicians performing the gambling subcategory of card magic and has published multiple works teaching card tricks using advanced card manipulation.

Roberto Giobbi has had one the largest impacts on modern card manipulation with his book series Card College, an encyclopedic work taking magicians through all the fundamentals for card magic, from easy manipulations to difficult manipulations in 5 volumes.

Dai Vernon, along with Ed Marlo, pioneered modern card manipulation in the context of magic.

S. W. Erdnase created one of the most influential books for card manipulation, and inspired other manipulation books, popularizing knowledge about card manipulation.

=== Early card manipulation ===
Giovanni Giuseppi Pinetti is often accredited with the title of first card magician, performing to notable figures such as King Louis XVII, and, from what records we have, started the trend of card magic. He, however, was not the first to perform or publish card magic or manipulation.

== See also ==
- List of card manipulation techniques
- Card flourish
- Card marking
- Card sharp
- Card throwing
- Sleight of hand
- Trick deck
