= List of Academy of Magical Arts Award Winners =

The Academy of Magical Arts gives out awards annually at its Academy of the Magical Arts Awards event. Nominess for the performance awards are chosen from those that have performed at The Magic Castle in the previous year. Other awards are given to individuals who have made significant contributions to the field of magic.

== Magician of the Year ==
Year	Winner(s)
1968	Dai Vernon
1970	Albert Goshman
1971	Ron Wilson
1972	Mark Wilson
1973	Shimada
1974	Mark Wilson
1975	Siegfried & Roy
1976	Doug Henning
1977	Norm Nielsen
1978	Harry Blackstone Jr.
1979	David Copperfield
1980	Cesareo Pelaez (Marco the Magi)
1981	Richiardi Jr.
1982	Paul Daniels
1983	Siegfried & Roy
1984	Harry Blackstone Jr.
1985	Lance Burton
1986	David Copperfield
1987	The Pendragons
1988	Walaa (Wello)
1989	Princess Tenko
1990	Silvan
1991	Lance Burton
1992	Juan Tamariz
1993	Jeff McBride
1994	The Pendragons
1995	Penn & Teller
1996	Ricky Jay
1997	Mark Kalin & Jinger
1998	Luis de Matos
1999	Silvan
2000	Joaquin Ayala
2001	Rick Thomas
2002	David Blaine
2003	Mac King
2004	Darren Romeo
2005	Criss Angel
2006	Cyril Takayama
2007	Derren Brown
2008	Guy Hollingworth
2009	Ed Alonzo
2010	Topas
2011	Lu Chen
2012	Penn & Teller
2013	Yo Ho-Jin
2014	Michael Carbonaro
2015	Dynamo
2016	Derek DelGaudio
2017	David Williamson
2018	David Blaine (Declined)
2019	Derren Brown

== Close-up Magician of the Year ==
Year	Winner(s)
1968	Albert Goshman
1969	Johnny Platt
1970	Mike Skinner
1971	Ron Wilson
1972	Bruce Cervon
1973	Mike Skinner
1974	Albert Goshman
1975	Bruce Cervon
1976	Jules Lenier
1977	David Roth
1978	Earl Nelson
1979	Daryl
1980	Daryl
1981	Michael Ammar
1982	Bob Jardine
1983	Michael Ammar
1984	John Carney
1985	Earl Nelson
1986	Johnny Ace Palmer
1987	Johnny Ace Palmer
1988	John Carney
1989	David Williamson
1990	David Williamson
1991	Martin Nash
1992	Tony Giorgio
1993	René Lavand
1994	Paul Gertner
1995	Paul Gertner
1996	Martin Nash
1997	Eugene Burger
1998	Eugene Burger
1999	Steve Valentine
2000	Lennart Green
2001	Steve Valentine
2002	Shoot Ogawa
2003	Whit Haydn
2004	Whit Haydn
2005	Shoot Ogawa
2006	Jon Armstrong
2007	Paul Green
2008	Doc Eason
2009	Doc Eason
2010	Suzanne
2011	Derek DelGaudio
2012	Derek DelGaudio
2013	Bill Goodwin
2014	Richard Turner
2015	Mike Pisciotta
2016	Mike Pisciotta
2017	Richard Turner
2018	Brian Gilils
2019	Asi Wind

== Stage Magician of the Year ==
Year	Winner(s)
1968	John Daniel
1969	Jim Carazini; Eric Lewis; Norm Nielsen
1970	Don Lawton
1971	Glenn Falkenstein
1972	Shimada
1973	Shimada
1974	Eric Lewis
1975	Shimada
1976	Johnny Thompson
1977	Peter Pit
1978	Goldfinger & Dove
1979	Whit Haydn
1980	Harry and Leslie Anderson
1981	Tomsoni and Company
1982	Goldfinger & Dove
1983	Lance Burton
1984	Jonathan Neal Brown
1985	The Pendragons
1986	The Pendragons
1987	Jonathan Neal Brown & Liane
1988	James Dimmare & Lisa
1989	Amos Levkovitch
1990	Amos Levkovitch
1991	Christopher Hart
1992	Falkenstein & Willard
1993	Christopher Hart
1994	Tina Lenert
1995	Falkenstein & Willard
1996	Jason Byrne
1997	Jason Byrne
1998	John Carney
1999	Ed Alonzo
2000	Ed Alonzo
2001	John Carney
2002	James Dimmare
2003	Kevin James
2004	Danny Cole
2005	Danny Cole
2006	Mike Caveney
2007	Dana Daniels
2008	Kevin James
2009	Jeff Hobson
2010	Dana Daniels
2011	Rob Zabrecky
2012	Rob Zabrecky
2013	Mike Caveney
2014	Pop Haydn
2015	Shoot Ogawa
2016	Tommy Ten and Amilie van Tass
2017	Shoot Ogawa
2018	Steve Valentine
2019	Lucy Darling

== Visiting Magician of the Year ==
Year	Winner(s)
1969	The Niberco Brothers
1970	Geoffrey Buckingham
1971	Shimada & Deanna
1972	Topper Martyn
1973	Francis Carlyle
1974	David Roth
1975	Martin Lewis
1976	Billy McComb
1977	Ger Copper
1978	Frances Willard
1979	Petrick & Mia
1980	Terry Seabrooke
1981	Lance Burton
1982	Ger Copper

== Lecturer of the Year ==
Year	Winner(s)
1968	Dick Zimmerman
1969	Clarke Crandall
1970	Bruce Cervon
1971	Bob Eads
1972	Lou Derman
1973	Clarke Crandall
1974	Ali Bongo
1975	Milbourne Christopher
1976	Sid Lorraine
1977	Pat Culliton
1978	Jerry Andrus
1979	Max Maven
1980	Karrell Fox
1981	Albert Goshman
1982	Michael Ammar
1983	Michael Ammar
1984	Eugen Burger
1985	Eugene Burger
1986	Gaëtan Bloom
1987	Chuck Fayne
1988	Daryl
1989	Dale Salwak
1990	David Williamson
1991	John Carney
1992	Daryl
1993	David Williamson
1994	Paul Gertner
1995	Johnny Ace Palmer
1996	David Roth
1997	Tom Mullica
1998	Peter Pit
1999	Johnny Ace Palmer
2000	Aldo Colombini
2001	David Regal
2002	Paul Green
2003	Aldo Colombini
2004	Bob Sheets
2005	Martin Lewis
2006	The Flicking Fingers
2007	Martin Lewis
2008	Jeff McBride
2009	Doc Eason
2010	David Regal
2011	Howard Hamburg
2012	Harry Anderson
2013	Steve Valentine
2014	Steve Valentine
2015	Doc Eason
2016	Rob Zabrecky
2017	John Carney
2018	Rob Zabrecky
2019	Dani DaOrtiz

== Parlour Magician of the Year ==
Year	Winner(s)
1983	Tom Ogden
1984	Tom Ogden
1985	Michael Ammar
1986	Daryl
1987	Daryl
1988	Kevin James
1989	John Carney
1990	Michael Ammar
1991	John Carney
1992	Chuck Fayne
1993	Chuck Fayne
1994	David Williamson
1995	Whit Haydn
1996	TC Tahoe
1997	TC Tahoe
1998	Aldo Colombini
1999	Aldo Colombini
2000	Martin Lewis
2001	Martin Lewis
2002	Whit Haydn
2003	Dana Daniels
2004	Dana Daniels
2005	Michael Finney
2006	Jason Alexander
2007	Shoot Ogawa
2008	Shoot Ogawa
2009	Andrew Goldenhersh
2010	Andrew Goldenhersh
2011	Hélder Guimarães
2012	Hélder Guimarães
2013	Johnny Ace Palmer
2014	Rob Zabrecky
2015	Rob Zabrecky
2016	Handsome Jack
2017	Johnny Ace Palmer
2018	Mike Pisciotta
2019	Chris Capehart

== Comedy Magician of the Year ==
Year	Winner(s)
2003	Dana Daniels
2004	Michael Finney
2005	Ed Alonzo
2006	Ed Alonzo

== Bar Magician of the Year ==
Year	Winner(s)
2004	Doc Eason
2005	Whit Haydn

== Masters Fellowship ==
Year	Winner(s)
1968	Dai Vernon
1969	Richard Cardini
1970	Virgil & Julie
1971	Jose Frakson
1972	Charlie Miller
1973	Slydini
1974	Dunninger
1975	Robert Harbin
1976	Les Levante
1977	Werner Dornfield
1978	Walter B. Gibson
1979	MacDonald & Mabel Birch Fred Kaps
1980	Gene Gordon
1981	Jay Marshall
1982	Joe Berg
1983	Maurice Rooklyn
1984	Eric Lewis
1985	Murray
1986	Tihany
1987	Mark Wilson
1988	Johnny Calvert
1989	Peter Warlock
1990	Channing Pollock
1991	Siegfried & Roy
1992	Ali Bongo
1993	Harry Blackstone Jr.
1994	Lee Grabel
1995	Borra
1996	Karrell Fox
1997	The Morettis
1998	Marvyn Roy
1999	Johnny Thompson
2000	John Booth
2001	Billy McComb
2002	Cesareo Pelaez
2003	Terry Seabrooke
2004	David Berglas
2005	Paul Daniels
2006	Paul Potassy
2007	Patrick Page
2008	Dominique
2009	Norm Nielsen
2010	Lance Burton
2011	René Lavand
2012	Juan Tamariz
2013	Fantasio
2014	Silvan
2015	John Gaughan
2016	Ger Copper
2017	David Copperfield
2022	Max Maven

== Performing Fellowship ==
Year	Winner(s)
1968	Richard Cardini, Harry Willard
1969	Jose Frakson, Slydini
1970	Kuda Bux
1971	Richiardi Jr.
1972	Les Levante
1973	Maurice Rooklyn
1974	Marvyn & Carol Roy
1975	Channing Pollock
1976	Roy Benson, Neil Foster
1977	Leon Mandrake, Tihany
1978	Johnny Platt, Russell Swann
1979	Jimmy Grippo
1980	Suzy Wandas Bennett
1981	Andre Kole
1982	John Calvert
1983	Billy McComb, The Morettis
1984	Carl Ballantine, Bert Easley
1985	Mardoni & Louise, Johnny Thompson
1986	Will Rock, Tom & Liz Tucker, Eddie Tullock
1987	Milo & Roger
1988	Shimada
1989	Topper Martyn
1990	Del Ray
1991	Don Alan
1992	Harry Blackstone Jr., Terry Seabrooke
1993	Norm Neilson
1994	Chuck & Jan Jones
1995	Doug Henning, Jack Kodell
1996	Michael Skinner, Tommy Wonder
1997	René Lavand, Peter Reveen
1998	Goldfinger & Dove, Martin Nash
1999	Bruce Cervon, Ed & Nancy Keener
2000	Richard Ross, Juan Tamariz
2001	Earl Nelson, The Pendragons
2002	Harry Lorayne, Alan Shaxon
2003	Walter "Zaney" Blaney
2004	Magic Christian
2005	Bobby Baxter, Flip Hallema
2006	Eugene Burger, Chen Kai
2007	Penn & Teller, Dr. Sawa
2008	Celeste Evans, Howie Schwarzman
2009	Pat Thompson, J.C. Wagner
2010	Franz Harary, Bob White
2011	Finn Jon
2012	David Williamson
2013	David Kaye
2014	John Carney
2015	Greg Frewin
2016	Luis Piedrahita, Fielding West
2017	Ray Anderson
2018	Bill Malone
2019	Raymond Crowe
2022	Charlie & Sherry Frye

== Creative Fellowship ==
Year	Winner(s)
1975	Alan Wakeling U.F. Grant
1976	Paul Curry
1977	Charles Reynolds
1978	Edmund Spreer Robert Stull
1979	Ali Bongo
1980	Ken Brooke Brother John Hamman
1981	Stewart James
1982	Ross Bertram Jack Chanin
1983	John Gaughan
1984	Karrell Fox
1985	Sam Berland
1986	Gil Leaney
1987	Jerry Andrus
1988	Tenyo
1989	Dick Zimmerman
1990	Jim Steinmeyer
1991	Don Wayne
1992	Herb Zarrow
1993	Patrick Page
1994	Larry Jennings
1995	Finn Jon
1996	John Kennedy
1997	Max Maven
1998	David Roth
1999	Gaëtan Bloom
2000	Ted Lasley
2001	Pavel
2002	Nick Trost
2003	Georges Proust
2004	Kevin James
2005	Eberhard Riese
2006	Paul Harris
2007	Steve Dushek
2008	Pierre Mayer
2009	Michael Weber
2010	Dean Dill
2011	Lubor Fiedler
2012	Paul Kieve
2013	David Regal
2014	Mark Setteducati
2015	Tom Stone
2016	Sebastien Clergue
2017	Chris Kenner
2018	Lennart Green
2019	Angelo Carbone
2022	Martin Lewis

== Literary & Media Fellowship ==
Year	Winner(s)
1968	Lewis Ganson Jack Potter
1969	Peter Warlock
1970	Walter B. Gibson
1971	Milbourne Christopher
1972	Frances Marshall
1973	Eric Lewis
1974	Martin Gardner
1975	Ed Marlo
1976	John Booth
1977	J. B. Bobo
1978	John Braun
1979	Glenn Gravatt
1980	Harry Lorayne
1981	Gerald Kosky
1982	Sam H. Sharpe
1983	Sid Lorraine
1984	Edwin A. Dawes
1985	Karl Fulves
1986	Bill Larsen Irene Larsen
1987	Robert Lund
1988	Robert Albo Ken de Courcy
1989	David Price
1990	Micky Hades
1991	Bascom Jones Jr.
1992	Karrell Fox
1993	Jon Racherbaumer
1994	Donald Bevan
1995	Robert Orben
1996	Stephen Minch
1997	Richard Kaufman
1998	Mike Caveney
1999	Val Andrews
2000	Richard Buffum
2001	Jim Steinmeyer
2002	Sid Fleischman
2003	Jim Reilly
2004	Bart Whaley
2005	David Britland
2006	David Goodsell Phil Willmarth
2007	William Kalush
2008	Louis Falanga
2009	Todd Karr
2010	Stan Allen
2011	Roberto Giobbi
2012	David Charvet
2013	Steve Beam (magician)
2014	Dan & Dave Buck
2015	Will Houstoun
2016	Dr Lori Pieper
2017	David Ginn
2018	Magicana
2019	Laura Avilés Ruda

== Special Fellowship ==
Year	Winner(s)
1968	Carl Owen
1969	Goodliffe Charlie Miller Ed Sullivan
1970	Tenkai
1971	Faucett Ross
1972	Carl Ballantine Marion Chavez Dunninger
1973	Johnny Giordmaine
1977	Loring Campbell
1978	Lloyd E. Jones
1979	Burling Hull Len Vintus
1980	Geraldine Larsen Jaffe Jane Thurston Shepard
1981	Moi-Yo Miller
1982	Leon & Teddy Leon
1983	Robert Albo Irving Desfor
1984	Marie Marshall Shigeo Takagi Orson Welles
1986	Stan Kramien James Randi Harry Stanley
1987	Bob Barker Jim Ravel
1988	Tom Bradley Homer Hudson
1989	John Fisher
1990	Charles Schulz
1991	Marshall Brodien
1992	Irene Larsen
1994	Ton Onosaka
1995	Lynette Chappell Litzka Raymond Gibson John Salisse
1996	Joe Stevens
1997	Roy Walton Señor Wences
1998	Jules Lenier
1999	Martin Breese
2000	David Berglas Diana Zimmerman
2001	John Kasnetsis
2002	Rick Heath Louis St. Pierre Jr.
2003	Manfred Thumm
2004	Mark Nelson
2005	Rich Bloch Dale Hindman Lew Horwitz
2006	Leo Behnke
2007	The Amazing Johnathan
2008	Eric Eswin
2009	Steve Forte
2010	Jules Fisher
2012	EMC Producers (Luis de Matos, David Britland, Marco Tempest) Carl Williams
2013	Robert Neale Joanie Spina
2014	Avner Eisenberg
2016	Edwin A. Dawes Franz Harary
2017	Ken Klosterman Tony DeLap Peter Lane
2019	Lisa Menna Alan Zagorsky
2021	Connie Boyd
2022	Tannen's Magic Camp Gary Beutler Gloria Dea David Sandy & Lance Rich

== Lifetime Achievement Fellowship ==
Year	Winner(s)
1985	William W. Larsen Jr.
1986	Don Lawton
1987	Milt Larsen
1988	Frances Ireland Marshall
1989	John Booth
1990	Jack McMillan
1991	Edwin Hooper
1992	Ron Wilson
1993	Charles Reynolds
1994	John Fisher
1995	Alan Wakeling
1996	Billy McComb
1997	Alex Elmsley
1998	Bev Bereron
1999	John Gaughan
2000	Stan Kramien
2001	Tihany
2002	Les Smith
2003	Al Cohen Christian Fechner
2004	Irene Larsen
2005	Martin Gardner
2006	Carl Ballantine
2007	Al Cohen
2008	Bob Fitch
2009	Chuck Jones
2010	John Daniel
2011	James Randi
2012	Alan Shaxon
2013	Ray Goulet
2014	Walter Blaney
2015	Ton Onosaka
2016	George Schindler
2017	Shimada
2018	Harry Lorayne
2019	

== Award of Merit ==
Year	Winner(s)
1970	Lou Derman John Gaughan Bill Groom Mattel Corporation Peter Pitt John Shrum Eleanor St. Germain
1971	George Boston Siegfried & Roy
1972	Bob McAllister
1973	Bob Barker Bill Bixby
1974	Ken Brooke The Magic Circle Henk Vermeyden James G. Williams
1975	Shirley Carroll Johnny Carson Danny Dew Doug Henning
1976	Jerry Blount Century III Programs, Inc. (Jack Rhodes, Wendell Wilks, Stanley Dorfman) David Copperfield Lewis P. Horwitz
1977	Ralph Edwards Pat Hennessy Jr. Peter Kersten
1978	Dick Cavett Dick Clark Armand Grant Ted Salter
1979	Robert Albo Ernie Evans Ken & Roberta Griffin Dale Harney Don Wayne
1980	The John Davidson Show Christian Fechner Sammy McKay Diana Zimmerman
1981	Paul Daniels Liberace
1982	Robert & Elaine Lund Peter Pit Jamal Rofeh
1983	Fred Anderson Eric Elkaim John Fisher
1984	Bill Cosko Ton Onosaka Joe Stevens Manfred Thumm
1985	Mark Nelson Jim Steinmeyer Dick Zimmerman
1986	Lynette Chappell John Kasnetsis Jeff Semel Richard M. Sherman
1987	Robert Dorian Benjamin Garth Ray Pierce
1988	Mike Elkan Margaret Hennessy Hugh Rappaport
1989	James Starr
1990	Dale Salwak
1992	Stan Allen Sandy Edberg
1993	Dick Foster
1994	Egil Berg Luis de Matos Merv Griffin
1995	The Dream Team (Gary Ouellet, Gary Pudney, Bob Jaffe)
1996	Bill Bowers Arnold Brema Mindy Edberg Triny Peller John Zweers
1997	Bob Busch Joan Lawton Rick Marcelli
1998	Gordon Beam Donna Chapman Mike Elkan Michael Flint Joe Hoffman Ron Jackson Mike Lacey Robert Parker
1999	George Juarez Mystina James G. Williams Fred & Wanda Wood
2000	Jean Boyle Ray Forgette Clark James Carol Marie Mark Nelson Scott Tokar John Zweers
2001	The Amazing Johnathan Gary Frank Terry Hill Francis B. Martineau David Thorsen
2002	Scott Smith
2003	Aldo Colombini
2004	David McKenzie
2006	Alan Rosson
2007	Rich Cowley Paul Gross
2010	William Scott Anderson
2011	Ira Goldstein Los Angeles Fire Department Skirball Cultural Center
2012	Najee Williams
2013	Neil Patrick Harris
2014	Randy Pitchford Alan Watson
2015	Erika Larsen
2016	Bill Smith Milt Larsen
2018	Dal Sanders Brian Tolman
2022	Shoot Ogawa & Simon Coronel
2022	Michael Fogiel Theron Trowbridge Warren Davis Clouse

== Junior Achievement Award ==
Year	Winner(s)
1976	Dirk Arthur
1977	Robbie Millman
1978	Geoffrey Williams
1979	Mark Kalin
1980	The Magic Company - Jim Heckel, Bob Pickens, Yvonne Pickens, Rita Messett. Mark Van Buren
1981	Scott Cervine Michael Weber
1982	Ed Alonzo Lorenzo Clark Bill Goodwin
1984	Ray Kosby Danny Scott
1985	Scott Tokar
1986	David Doyle
1989	Jason Alexander Mark Matsumoto
1990	Steve Barnes
1992	Michael J. Battistoni
1995	Chris Gongora
1996	Matt Marcy
1997	Wesley Edberg
1998	Danny Cole Thomas Meier Bryan Stoops
1999	James Holguin
2000	Joseph Tran
2001	Jason Latimer
2002	David Stryker
2003	Jonathon Dabach M. Sidney Beckman Joel Ward
2004	Tony Elias
2005	Jessica Phillips
2006	Nathan Gibson
2007	Edsel Chiu Michael Jacobson
2008	Farrah Siegel
2009	Rmax Goodwin Aaron Rabkin
2010	Jeff Black
2011	Krystyn Lambert Tricky Devil Sean Trinh
2013	John Accardo Kyle Eschen Akinobu Mitsui Hyuma Miyahara
2014	Mark A. Gibson
2015	Jesus (Nexxus) Flores Frankie Foti Paul Robaia
2016	Collins Key
2017	Griffin Barry Kevin Li
2018	Franco Pascali Fernando Velasco Rabby Yang
2019	Austin Janik
2022	Aaron O'Brien & Gonçalo Sousa

== Junior Award Merit ==
Year	Winner(s)
1996	Jason Neistadt
2000	Jay Scott Berry
2014	Sean Self

== Special Recognition Award ==
Year	Winner(s)
1974	Jerry Rosen

== Special Achievement Award ==
Year	Winner(s)
2005	Chuck Jones

== Blackstone Theatre Award ==
Year	Winner(s)
1997	Lance Burton
1998	Jeff McBride

== Strolling Magician ==
Year	Winner(s)
2004	Mark Collier

== Technical Achievement Award ==
Year	Winner(s)
2006	Bryan Lee

== Devant Award ==
Year	Winner(s)
2019	The Larsen Family (presented by The Magic Circle)
