= Wakeling =

Wakeling is an English surname. Notable people with the surname include:

- Alan Wakeling (1926–2004), American magician and inventor
- Brandon Wakeling (born 1994), Australian weightlifter
- Dave Wakeling (born 1956), English singer-songwriter and musician
- Denis Wakeling (1918–2004), Anglican bishop
- Gwen Wakeling (1901–1982), American costume designer
- Jacob Wakeling (born 2001), English footballer
- Jason Wakeling (born 1968), New Zealand sport shooter
- John Wakeling (born 1979), English cricketer
- Mark Wakeling (born 1971), English actor
- Nick Wakeling (born 1971), Australian politician
- Steve Wakeling (born 1983), English kickboxer
