= Paul Gertner =

American magician

- Born: 1953 (age 72–73); Pittsburgh, Pennsylvania, U.S.
- Occupations: Magician, Lecturer
- Website: http://www.gertner.com

Paul Gertner (born 1953) is an American close-up magician from Pittsburgh. He is best known in the magic world for his Steel and Silver book and set of DVDs.

== Magic career ==
Gertner's interest in magic began as a child, borrowing library books on the subject. He claims his interest in magic began with his father, who created "magical" home movies using special effects and an 8 mm video camera.

When he was sixteen, Gertner worked nights at the Forks Hotel in Buffalo, New York, learning a great deal about how to interact with an audience and the psychological side of performing. His mentor there was the Forks' owner, legendary bar magician Eddie Fechter.

From the mid-1970s on, Gertner performed mostly corporate gigs and trade shows, and has worked for a variety of companies, including IBM, NASA, GlaxoSmithKline, and US Steel.

Gertner has appeared on The Tonight Show Starring Johnny Carson three times, and was a guest on episode 1437 of Mister Rogers' Neighborhood. He has also appeared on Penn & Teller: Fool Us five times—a first for the show—and successfully fooled the hosts twice.

== Competition act ==
Gertner is famous for his competition act, which he used to win first place at the Las Vegas Desert Seminar $10,000 and first place at FISM.

The act consists of three different routines: That's Ridiculous, The Steel Cups and Balls, and Ring on Hourglass.

That's Ridiculous comprises coins appearing magically underneath playing cards placed on a table. This routine is fast-paced and energetic, with the rapid-fire production of six half dollars, two silver dollars, and finally an oversized giant half-dollar in only a few seconds.

The Steel Cups and Balls is Gertner's approach to the classic cups and balls routine. Three steel ball bearings vanish and appear in and around three steel cups. The routine ends with several massive, heavy ball bearings being produced from the cups and dropping to the table with a large thud. Part of the trick's surprise is that one of the bearings is too big to fit in the cup, despite having just been produced from it.

Finally, a ring borrowed from a spectator that was vanished at the beginning of the act appears on the middle of a beautiful hourglass used to time the act. The glass of the hourglass actually has to be smashed with a hammer to make the removal of the ring possible.

== Personal life ==
Gertner has a wife named Kathryn, a daughter named Beth, and a son named Bill. He also has four granddaughters.

== Published works ==
Gertner's most popular published work is Steel and Silver (Richard J. Kaufman, 1994), which Gertner claims to be the fastest-selling magic book in history. This book has also been released as a DVD set by L&L Publishing.

== Selected awards ==
- 1985: first prize in micro magic from Fédération Internationale des Sociétés Magiques (FISM) competition
- 1994: lecturer of the year from The Academy of Magical Arts
- 1994: close-up magician of the year from The Academy of Magical Arts
- 1995: close-up magician of the year from The Academy of Magical Arts
