= Charlie Miller (magician) =

American magician (1909–1989)

- Born: Charles Earle Miller; May 25, 1909; Indianapolis, Indiana, U.S.
- Died: August 13, 1989 (aged 80)
- Occupation: Magician
- Known for: Sleight of hand, card magic
- Notable work: "Magicana" Column (1964–1988), The Magic of Charlie Miller

Charlie Earle Miller (May 25, 1909 – August 13, 1989) was an American magician known for his sleight of hand, particularly with playing cards, and his performances of classical magic. He was a longtime associate of Dai Vernon and Faucett Ross and was an influential teacher of other famous magicians, including Johnny Thompson and Ricky Jay.

== Biography ==
Miller was born in Indianapolis, Indiana. He developed an interest in magic at an early age and became acquainted with several prominent magicians, including Max Malini.

He later moved to California and became a regular performer at the Magic Castle in Hollywood. Although particularly known for his card magic, Miller also performed traditional stage and parlor magic, including the tricks Cups and balls, the Miser's Dream, and the Egg Bag, for which he was especially regarded.

From 1964 to 1978, he edited the "Magicana" column in Genii, a magic industry periodical. He was also known for sharing his knowledge with other performers. Johnny Thompson, who regarded Miller as an important mentor, credited him with helping to shape his professional career.

Miller received the Masters Fellowship from the Academy of Magical Arts in 1972.
