= Daryl (magician) =

American magician (1955–2017)

Daryl Easton
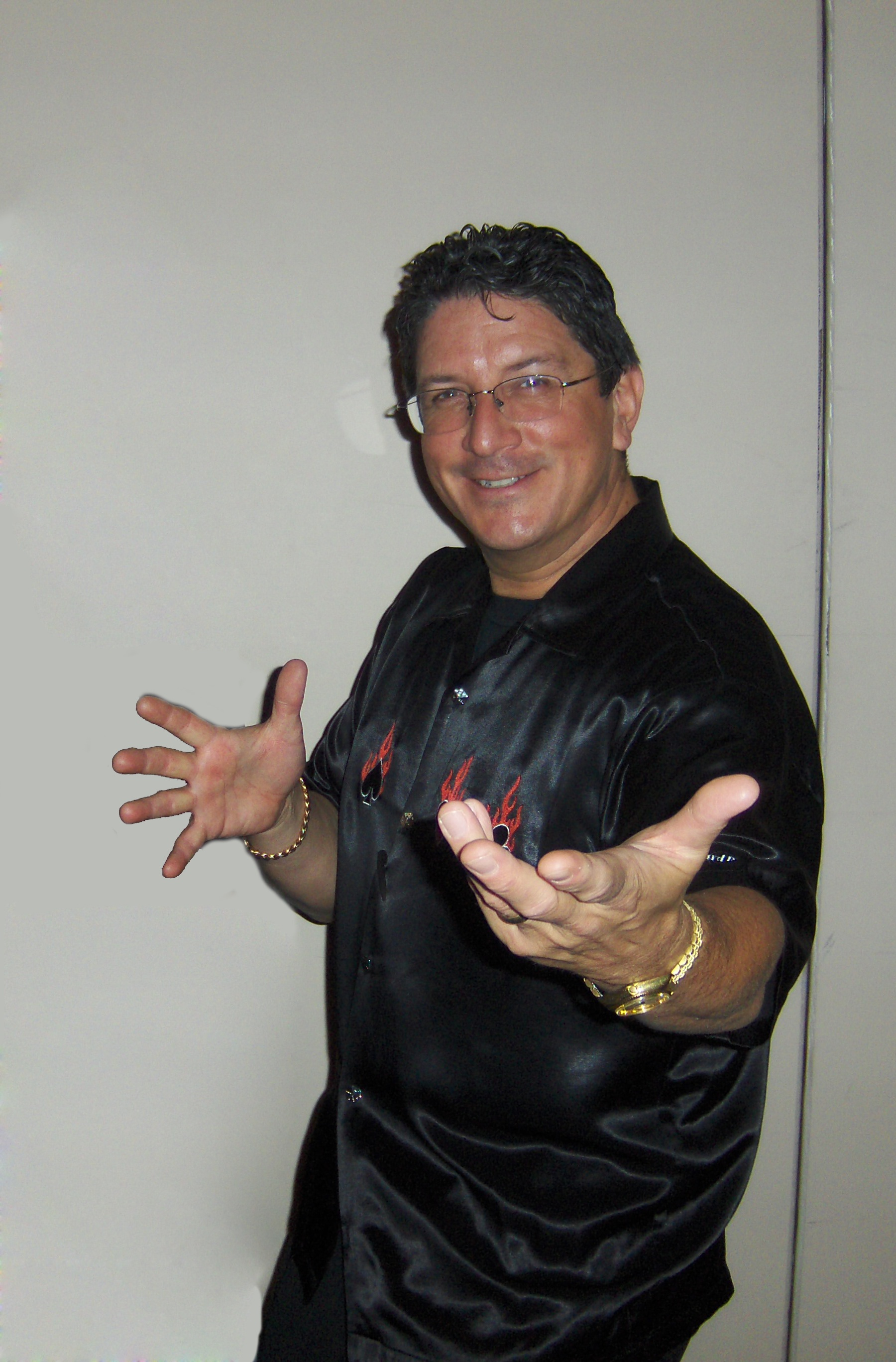
- Daryl in 2010
- Born: Daryl Martinez; August 13, 1955
- Died: February 24, 2017 (aged 61); Los Angeles, California, U.S.
- Other name: Daryl
- Occupation: Magician
- Known for: Magic tricks, sleight of hand magic, master of prestidigitation
- Spouse: Alison Easton
- Website: daryl.net

Daryl Easton (August 13, 1955 – February 24, 2017), born Daryl Martinez, known professionally as the mononomous Daryl, was an American magician. He marketed himself with the self-proclaimed title of "The Magician's Magician". Daryl usually went by his first name only. He specialized in card tricks, close-up and parlor magic.

== Early life ==
His first contact with magic was in 1962, as a seven-year old. A Svengali Deck his friend's family gave him was the start of everything. He was fascinated by magic as he thought of the kinds of tricks he could perform with this trick deck.

At first, he only showed his friends and family his tricks, but he later began performing street magic in San Diego. For several years, he would perform in the street during the day and perform close-up magic in night clubs at night, wearing a tuxedo.

== Career ==
In 1973, when he was 18, his performance at an exhibition held by the Kaiser Aluminum company was well received, and he began to travel with the company to perform at their exhibitions.

In 1999 and 2000 Daryl and his magician wife, Alison, toured the world with Daryl's "New Millennium World Tour Lecture". They lectured and performed in over 250 cities in 25 different countries.

In January 2001, Daryl performed magic at the inauguration celebration of President George W. Bush.

Daryl performed and lectured in Japan multiple times, including in February 1982, March 1983, 1985, September 1990 and 2000, and November 2005.

He was a headline act at Caesars Magical Empire, Caesars Palace, Las Vegas for seven years before deciding in 2003 to move, along with his young family, to the Sierra Foothills of northern California. There he continued to write, invent and perform magic for both lay people and the magical community.

Two of his most famous contributions to magic were the "Hot Shot Cut", a knuckle-busting sleight where the spectator's chosen card spins like a boomerang out of the deck, and the "Ultimate Ambition" trick which allows a card to be inserted fairly into the middle of a deck and yet appear back on top.

== Lecturer ==
He was well known to magicians as the presenter of many teach-in video series for L&L Publishing, including Daryl's Card Revelations, Encyclopedia of Card Sleights, FoolerDoolers, and Daryl's Ambitious Card Video.

In addition to lecturing around the world, he also taught individual and group lessons at his home. His wife, Alison Easton, was amongst the first women to be inducted into The Magic Circle.

== Awards ==
Daryl won the gold medal at FISM - the World Congress of Magic (the "Olympics" of Magic), in Lausanne, Switzerland in 1982, with a routine that included his now famous Ambitious Card Routine using the Ultimate Ambition. He won six Academy Awards from The Magic Castle in Hollywood, California. Twice, his peers voted him Close-Up Magician of the Year (1980 and 1981), twice Parlour Magician of the Year (1986 and 1987) and twice Lecturer of the Year (1988 and 1992). More recently he was voted one of the 100 most influential magicians of the 20th century by the now defunct Magic Magazine. The list goes on and on with victories in every major competition he entered.

- 1978 IBM San Diego Tournament Winner
- 1980 Academy of Magical Arts Magician of the Year Award
- 1981 Academy of Magical Arts Magician of the Year Award
- 1982 FISM Lausanne, Switzerland: Close-up Category, Gold Medal (first place)
- 1985 Las Vegas: Desert Magic Seminar Winner
- 1986 Academy of Magical Arts Parlor Magician of the Year Award
- 1987 Academy of Magical Arts Parlor Magician of the Year Award
- 1988 Academy of Magical Arts Lecturer of the Year Award
- 1992 Academy of Magical Arts Lecturer of the Year Award

== Publications ==
- Daryl Martinez Magic Lecture Notes.
- with Minch, Stephen (1980). Secrets of a Puerto Rican Gambler. The PR Press.
- Convention Sessions #1 Lecture Notes. 1980.
- Something for Everyone – Magic Lecture #2. 1982.
- with Minch, Stephen (1982). For Your Entertainment Pleasure. The PR Press.
- Daryl's Psychological Assembly or The Jolly Jumping Jokers. 1985.
- with Minch, Stephen (1987). Daryl's Ambitious Card Omnibus.
- Daryl Does Den Haag. 1988.
- New Millenium World Tour. 1999.
- Fooler Droolers. 2003.

=== Videos, DVDs, Streaming Media ===
- Greater Magic Library #7 Daryl, Stevens Magic Emporium 1985
- Magic Castle Lecture, 1989 (VHS only)
- Daryl Live From London, two volumes (VHS only)
- Expert Rope Magic Made Easy, three volumes
- Daryl's Encyclopedia of Card Sleights, eight volumes, L+L Publishing
- Daryl's Ambitious Card
- Daryl's Card Revelations, five volumes, L+L Publishing
- New Millennium World Tour Lecture, 2002
- Daryl Does The Full Monte!, L+L Publishing
- Fooler Doolers, three volumes, L+L Publishing
- Las Vegas Magic Invitational Live 2003 (with others)
- Daryl Penguin Live Lecture, Penguin Magic
- Essentials in Magic, Cups and Balls
- Essentials in Magic, Sponge Balls
- Essentials in Magic, Linking Rings
- Essentials in Magic, Invisible Deck
- Essentials in Magic, Stripper Deck
- Essentials in Magic, Svengali Deck
- Essentials in Magic, Mental Photography Deck
- Magic Made Simple

== Death ==
On February 24, 2017, Daryl was found dead in his dressing room at Hollywood's Magic Castle, before a scheduled performance. He was 61.

Initial media reports stated that Daryl died from suicideHe committed suicide by hanging. The final coroner report of the Los Angeles County Department of Medical Examiner ruled the death as suicide by hanging.
