= Robert E. Neale =

American minister, psychologist and magician (1929–2025)

Robert Edward Neale (June 23, 1929) is an American minister, psychologist, paperfolder and magician, who wrote several books on the combination of these topics.

== Early life and career ==
Neale was born in Mount Clemens, Michigan on June 23, 1929, the son of a lawyer, and grew up in Detroit, Michigan. He studied at Amherst College and Union Theological Seminary (New York City), working there with Paul Tillich. After working from 1954 to 1957 as a minister for the United Church of Christ, he returned to Union Theological Seminary for doctoral study in 1958. He took a faculty position in the psychology of religion there in 1962, completed his PhD in 1964, and earned tenure in 1967. The death of his brother in the same year sparked his interest in death, and he spent six months in England on sabbatical as a guest chaplain, working with the newly formed hospice movement there. He retired in 1986.

== Magic and paperfolding ==
Neale's interest in magic began at an early age. He was one of the founders of the Friends of The Origami Center, the predecessor organization to Origami USA, and in 1981 he was named as its first president. He was awarded a Special Fellowship by the Academy of Magical Arts in 2013.

== Books ==
Neale's books on magic and paperfolding include:

- Bunny Bill (Magic Inc, 1964)
- Tricks of the Imagination (with Stephen Minch, Hermetic Press, 1991)
- Origami, Plain and Simple (with Tom Hull, St. Martin's Press, 1994)
- Magic and Meaning (with Eugene Burger, Hermetic Press, 1995; expanded, 2009)
- Folding Money Fooling: How to Make Entertaining Novelties from Dollar Bills (Kaufman, 1997)
- Frog Tales: How To Fold Jumping Frogs From Poker Cards and do Five Tricks with Them (H & R Magic Books, 2001)
- The Magic Mirror (with David Parr, Hermetic Press, 2002)
- This is Not a Book (Hermetic Press, 2008)
- 444 and Three More (Theory & Art of Magic Press, 2011)
- Nine Uneasy Pieces (Theory & Art of Magic Press, 2012)
- The Magic of Celebrating Illusion (Theory & Art of Magic Press, 2013)
- The Sense of Wonder (Theory & Art of Magic Press, 2014)
- An Essay on Magic (Theory & Art of Magic Press, 2015)
- Breaking Our Magic Wands (Theory & Art of Magic Press, 2017)
- Many Modes of Origami Modular Models (with Michael Naughton, 2017)
- Magic Inside Out (with Lawrence Hass, Theory & Art of Magic Press, 2021)

His other books include:

- In Praise of Play: Toward a Psychology of Religion (Harper & Row, 1969)
- The Art of Dying (Harper & Row, 1973)
- Death and Ministry: Pastoral care of the dying and the bereaved (edited with J. Donald Bane, Austin H. Kutscher, and Robert B. Reeves Jr., Seabury Press, 1973)
- Loneliness, Solitude, and Companionship: New Dimensions in Relationship (Westminster Press, 1984)
