= Lloyd Jones (magician) =

Lloyd E. Jones (1906-1984) was a magician, pharmacist, book dealer and publisher.

== Biography ==
Born in Grass Valley, California, Jones moved to Oakland as a child.

He was the proprietor of Magic Limited in Oakland, California from around 1941 until his death. His house organs were The Bat, Bat Jr., S.O.B. Jr. and finally Bat Droppings.

He wrote book reviews for Genii Magazine under a column titled "Light From The Lamp" for many years and later in Tops.

Jones served as the first President of the Pacific Coast Association of Magicians, was a founding member and a president of the Oakland Magic Circle, helped to form the Magic Dealers Association and served as a national president of the Society of American Magicians.

In April 1981 he was made an Honorary Member of the Magic Collectors Association.

He mentored younger magicians, such as Pete Biro, and published, edited, or wrote over 50 books on magic.
