= Los Angeles Conference on Magic History =

Biennial invitation-only event

The Los Angeles Conference on Magic History is a biennial invitation-only conference created to showcase historical magic. The conference was started in 1989, designed to highlight various aspects of the history of magic from around the world. Each conference features a series of re-created performances and lectures from famous and well noted magicians. The event is co-hosted by Ricky Jay, Mike Caveney, John Gaughan and Jim Steinmeyer. Past conferences have featured unique recreations of historical illusions, including effects from Guy Jarrett, David Devant, John Nevil Maskelyne and Dr. Samuel Cox Hooker.

== Past Conferences ==
- 1989 DeKolta's Expanding Die, Automata, Thayer magic
- 1991 Rene Lavand, The Charles Carter Show
- 1993 Hooker Card Rise, Sawing a Woman in Halves.
- 1995 Tribute to Robert Lund, The Blue Room.
- 1997 Will, the Witch and the Watch, the Chess Automaton.
- 1999 The Mascot Moth, the Automaton Clarinet Player.
- 2001 Guy Jarrett’s creations, The Million Dollar Mystery, The Great Fasola
- 2003 Tanagra, Lesley Hazlitt (Piddington), Devant’s Chocolate Soldier from St. George's Hall and Morritt’s famous Oh! illusion from Egyptian Hall.
- 2005 The Mighty Cheese, Professor Thomas Tobin’s Palingenesia, Del Adelphia, and Kellar’s Psycho.
- 2007 Hooker Rising Cards
