= David Williamson (magician) =

American magician, actor and writer (born 1961)

- Born: 1961 (age 64–65); Xenia, Ohio, U.S.
- Occupations: Magician, actor and writer
- Website: davidwilliamson.com

David Williamson (born 1961) is an American professional sleight-of-hand artist, magician, actor, and writer.

David Britland of Genii magazine called him "an exceptional stage performer" and "a magician who changed the way we do magic." He was named Magician of the Year in 2017 by the Academy of the Magical Arts, and was named an Honorary Member of prestigious British association The Magic Circle.

== Personal life ==
Williamson was born in 1961 in Xenia, Ohio. His father was a farmer and factory worker.

He became interested in magic as a child, studying and learning tricks from Henry Hay's book The Amateur Magician's Handbook and eventually becoming the assistant to a local magician who called himself Quacky the Clown.

Williamson met his future wife, Marsha, in high school by impressing her with a coin trick. They married during college. Williamson was an art major but dropped out, preferring to start a career as a magician. He and his wife have two children.

== Career ==
While still in college and working as a dishwasher while performing in the evenings, Williamson won the 1981 Gold Cups International Award of Excellence in Close-up Performance, commonly regarded as the most prestigious "close-up" award in the International Brotherhood of Magicians competitions.

In 1984, he and his wife moved to Europe, where he performed frequently at conventions in England and elsewhere.

In 1989, he wrote a book about his magic act, Williamson's Wonders, with Richard Kaufman. His comedic style began to earn him a reputation and further bookings, for corporate events and eventually a television special, Champions of Magic. In the 2000s, he began performing regularly for Disney Cruise Line.

He has recorded four instructional videos in magic and sleight-of-hand.

He played the ringmaster in the touring Broadway show Circus 1903, and performed with touring production The Illusionists.

== Works ==
- Williamson's Wonders (written with Richard Kaufman, 1989)

== Honors and awards ==
Besides the honors noted above, Williamson was named the Academy of Magical Arts' Close-up Magician of the Year in 1989 and 1990, Lecturer Magician of the Year in 1990 and 1993, Parlour Magician of the Year in 1994, and received its Performing Fellowship in 2012.
