= Larry Jennings =

American magician

- Born: February 17, 1933; Detroit, Michigan
- Died: October 17, 1997 (aged 64); Los Angeles, California
- Occupation: Magician
- Known for: Coin and card tricks
- Spouse: B. J. Jennings (m. 1990)
- Website: Larry Jennings

Larry Jennings (February 17, 1933 – October 17, 1997) was an American magician, best known for his card techniques. He has nine books published by, or written about him. He is also known for being close friends with fellow magician Dai Vernon.

== Biography ==
=== Early life ===
Jennings was born in Detroit, Michigan, on February 17, 1933. He was born to John Alfred Jennings and Eva Jennings (née Jones). After his parents divorced, Jennings divided his time between staying with his father in Detroit and his mother in Georgia.

At age 16, while in Detroit, Jennings joined the United States Navy. He started his service on June 29, 1949, and was honorably discharged on April 22, 1953. After his discharge, Jennings moved back to Detroit and met a French-Canadian woman named Nina Chauvin, whom he later married.

In 1956, while in Windsor, Ron Wilson moved in across the hall from Jennings. Jennings came over one day and asked Ron if he had a deck of cards. He then proceeded to show Ron the trick he had learned in the Navy. Afterwards, not knowing Ron was a magician, Jennings asked him if he knew any magic. Ron then showed Larry “Out of This World,” which completely fooled him. Jennings asked Ron to teach him the effect, but Ron resisted. Instead, he told him to think about it. Jennings eventually figured it out, and Ron continued to teach him magic, introducing him to the world of magic, including the magic of Edward Marlo and Dai Vernon.

In the early 1960s, Jennings and Ron Wilson met Dai Vernon for the first time at a convention in Cleveland.

=== Magic career ===
In 1964, Karrell Fox told Jennings about the Magic Castle. Knowing that Dai Vernon now lived in Hollywood, Jennings quit his job as a combustion engineer. He and Nina moved to California and lived at 2005 Ivar Street, Apt. 7. In Hollywood, Larry got a job working for Leo Behnke’s father in the plumbing repair business. Jennings quickly became friends with Dai Vernon and studied under him. During this same year, Larry’s first published ideas, “A Snappy Lift” and “Lift No. 2,” appeared in a letter from Dai Vernon to The Gen magazine.

In July 1967, Jennings published his first set of lecture notes, Lecture Notes On Card And Coin Handling. These notes were written by his wife, Nina. In the same year, a collection of Jennings’s magic appeared in Dai Vernon’s Ultimate Secrets Of Card Magic.

In 1969, Jennings traveled with Dai Vernon on his lecture tour of Japan. Here he met Hideo Kato, who acted as their interpreter. In 1970, a second set of notes were published for a special lecture Jennings gave at the Hollywood Roosevelt Hotel, written by his. Larry’s one-man issue of Genii was also published in May 1970. The effects were written by Jules Lenier. In this same year, Hideo Kato came to America and studied card magic with Larry. He wrote a book on Larry’s card technique, entitled Larry Jennings-No Card Magic Nyuumon. Written in Japanese, the book has yet to be translated into English.

Jennings and Nina were divorced early 1970s. In the mid-1970s, Jennings met his second wife, Geri, in Los Angeles. They married and moved to Lake Tahoe, where Jennings opened up his own plumbing company, Jenco. They later divorced. Also in the mid-1970s, Karl Fulves published a special two-part issue of Epilogue featuring Jennings’ magic.

Jennings met B.J. in Lake Tahoe in 1977, where she worked as a blackjack dealer at a casino Jennings frequents. Jennings also met Jeff Busby, who would release the book Jennings On Card And Coin Handling (1977).

In 1979, Jennings was the guest of honor at the annual Fechter’s Finger Flicking Frolic. He presents a new lecture for the event. Following his appearance at Fechter’s, Larry was invited to lecture in Japan. The Japan Lecture Notes were produced for the occasion. These are put together by B.J. and Louis Falanga.

In the early 1980s Jennings sold his business in Lake Tahoe and moved to Newport Beach, CA to work at the Magic Island. Jennings was the resident magician, and was placed in charge of booking. He tried to get higher pay for the magicians, and when the management refused, he quit. Jennings then moved in with James Patton. The two frequently had sessions. Jim convinced Jennings to do another lecture and in 1982, Jennings lectured at the Magic Castle, presenting the material from A Visit With Larry Jennings. Jennings later went to work for the Los Angeles Unified School District and moved to North Hollywood. Also in the early 1980s, Jennings went to France, and shot his first magic videos for Pierre Mayer.

In 1986, Jennings and Louis Falanga started L&L Publishing. In April 1986, Larry Jennings and Dai Vernon were invited to perform at the Circulo De Magios Maxicanos IV Convencion De Magia in Mexico. Also in 1986, The Classic Magic Of Larry Jennings was released. It would be the largest collection of Larry’s magic to date, containing over eighty effects. This was quickly followed by the publication of Neoclassics (1987) and The Cardwright (1988).

Jennings and B.J. were wed on December 28, 1990. Michael Skinner would be the best man. During the 1990s, Larry continued to share his magic with two new sets of lecture notes and five videotapes. In 1995, Larry was awarded the Creative Fellowship by the Academy of Magical Arts. Larry continued to frequent the Magic Castle through this time, performing both formally and informally.

== Personal ==
Jennings and B.J. continued to live in North Hollywood until his death on October 17, 1997, at age sixty-four.

== After death ==
Since his death, Jennings’s magic continues to inspire with the publication of his effects in various magazines and most notably in Richard Kaufman’s book, Jennings ’67. It is the largest collection of Larry’s magic since The Classic Magic Of Larry Jennings.

In 2020, Richard Kaufman wrote and published the largest book yet of Jennings's original material, the second volume in a trilogy. Titled Mr. Jennings Takes it Easy, it concentrates on the less difficult card magic Jennings developed between 1965 and his death in 1997.

Two legendary names are associated with making the chop cup popular as they were their "signature" pieces — Don Alan and Jennings. History records that Wheatley saw Jennings perform his chop cup routine at The Magic Castle shortly after it opened in 1963. He was so impressed that he asked Jennings to please not reveal his method or routine in print until after his death. Jennings kept his promise, and did not publish his routine until a year after Wheatley's death. It was published in Genii Magazine, Volume 29, Number 7, in March 1965.

== Awards and honors ==
- Creative Fellowship from the Academy of the Magical Arts (1995)

== Published works ==
- Stabbed Coincidence (1977)
- The Coin And Beer Can (1977)
- Larry Jennings On Card And Coin Handling (1977)
- The Classic Magic of Larry Jennings (1986).
- NeoClassics (1987)
- The Cardwright (1988)
- Jennings '67 (1997)
- Up in Smoke (2005)
- Mr. Jennings Takes it Easy (2020)
