= Doc Eason =

American magician (born 1947)

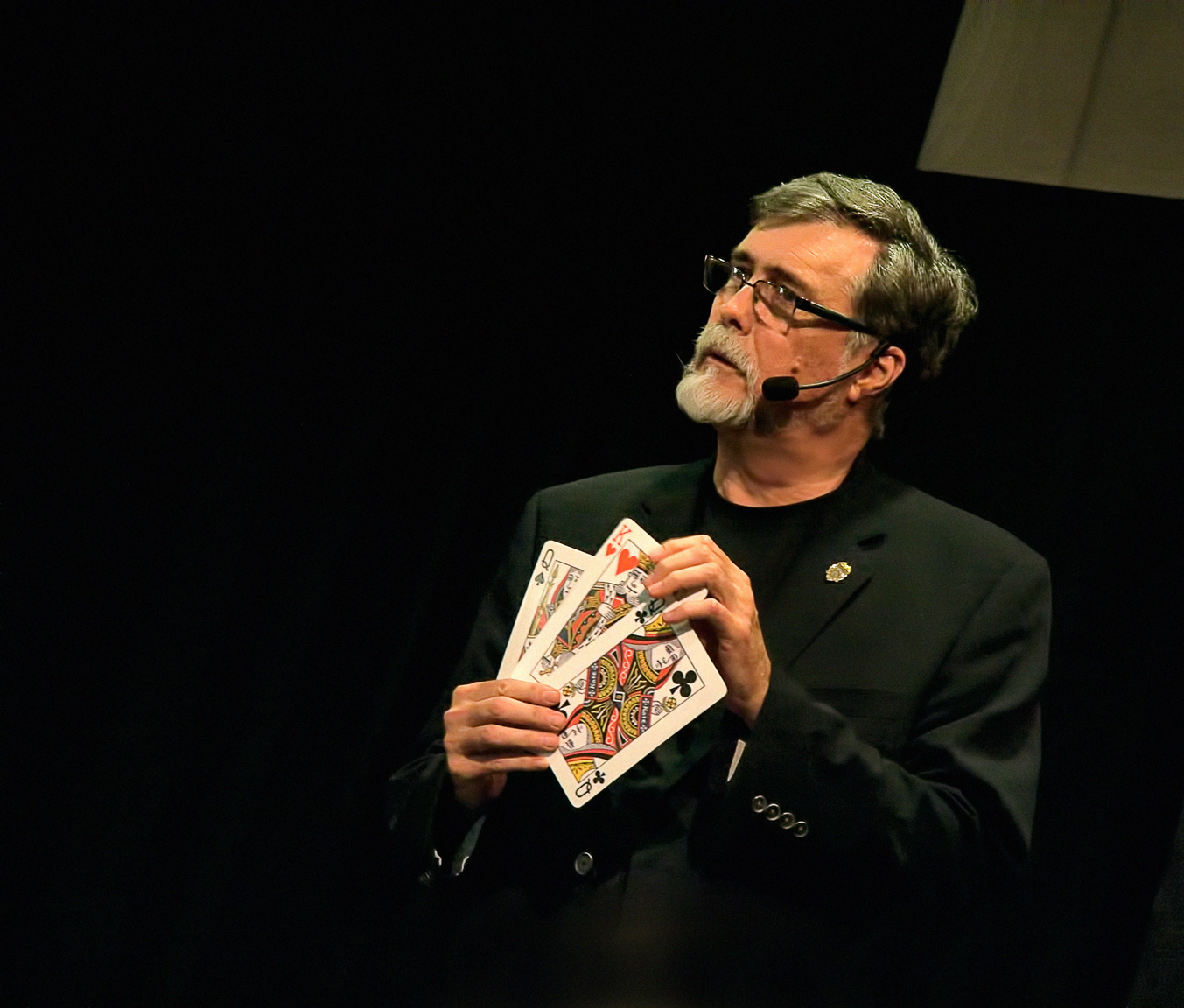
- Eason in 2010
- Born: William H. Eason; July 22, 1947 (age 79); Naugatuck, Connecticut
- Occupations: Illusionist, Magician, Entertainer, Lecturer, Public Speaker, Author, Teacher, Consultant
- Website: Doc Eason Magic

William H. "Doc" Eason (born July 22, 1947) is an American magician who specializes in bar magic. For 27 years, he was the featured entertainer at John Denver's Tower Comedy Magic Bar in Snowmass Village, Colorado, from 1977 to 2004. He is also a corporate entertainer, lecturer, public speaker, author, teacher, consultant and recently was involved in the Fox TV show "Masters of Illusion". He talks to corporate and association groups about "The Therapy of Laughter" and connecting with customers.

Widely recognized as one of the premier bar magicians of our time, he has lectured on the subject all over the US as well as Australia, Canada, England, Scotland, Netherlands, Austria, Germany, Denmark, Sweden and Norway and most recently Japan.

Eason credits magician Bob Sheets as one of his significant influences. He also names Steve Spill, J. C. Wagner, Eddie Houlihan, Eddie Goldstein, and Bob Read as influences.

== Awards ==
In 2004 he was the recipient of the first-ever W. C. Fields Magic Bartender of the Year by the prestigious Magic Castle in Hollywood, where he regularly performs.

In 2008, he was awarded Closeup Magician of the Year from the Magic Castle in Hollywood. In 2009 he was awarded Closeup Magician of the Year and Lecturer of the Year.

In 2016, he was awarded Lecturer of the Year from the Academy of Magic Arts at the Magic Castle in Hollywood.

== Publications ==
- Fusillade, Notes on the Multiple Selection of Cards, By Doc Eason (coauthored with Paul Cummins)
- Shot In The Act, Notes From The Working Repertoire, By Doc Eason
- Aspen Bar Magic - Magical Arts Journal, By Doc Eason (coauthored by Michael Ammar)
- Cocktails & Doc Tales, By Doc Eason
