= Matt Marcy =

American comedian-magician

Matt Marcy (born 1976, Los Angeles, California) is an American comedian-magician known for his original, comedy illusions. In 1997 he was named by the Academy of Magical Arts (The Magic Castle) as its top ranking young magician when he was just 20 years old. He was a Master of Ceremonies at Wizardz Dinner Theater at Universal Studios Hollywood. He is now primarily a corporate entertainer, and has performed for a variety of celebrities and dignitaries, including Prince Faisel of Saudi Arabia. He was also an opening act for The Amazing Johnathan at the Sahara Hotel and Casino and the Golden Nugget in Las Vegas, and recently appeared on the A&E TV show Magic Castle After Dark.

Marcy wrote and consulted for Walt Disney Imagineering in the Theme Park Productions department, including for the Thea award-winning CinéMagique at Walt Disney Studios Park in Disneyland Resort Paris. He has also written for Magic Magazine.

In 2006, Marcy released his own instructional DVD, Simple Tricks...To Blow Their Minds!

In 2018, Marcy performed on the show Penn & Teller: Fool Us, but failed to fool the hosts.

He has a political science degree from Brown University.
