= Shoot Ogawa =

Japanese magician

Shoot Ogawa (born 1975) is a Japanese magician. He has been interested in magic from the age of 10.

He has been featured on the cover of the Magic Magazine March 2003 issue. He has also appeared on "After Dark At The Magic Castle."

== Awards ==
- The Academy of Magical Arts, Award of Merit (2022)
- The Academy of Magical Arts, Stage Magician of the Year (2015, 2017)
- The Academy of Magical Arts, Parlour Magician of the Year (2007, 2008)
- Fechter’s Finger Flicking Frolic World Magic Convention, Most Valuable Participant Award (2007)
- The Academy of Magical Arts, Close-Up Magician of the Year (2004, 2005)
- International Magic Convention (London) Grand Prix (2002)
- Midwest Magic Jubilee (St. Louis) Grand Prix (1993)

== Publications ==
- “Laws of Attraction by Shoot Ogawa”
- "Ogawa University Volume One by Shoot Ogawa"
- "Ogawa University Volume Two by Shoot Ogawa"
- "Ogawa University Volume Three by Shoot Ogawa"
- "Ogawa University Volume Four by Shoot Ogawa"
- "Shoot Force by Shoot Ogawa"
- "Shoot In Hollywood by Shoot Ogawa"
- "Something Silly with Shoot Ogawa"
- "The Magic Dave Show: Shoot Ogawa"
- "The Ninja Rings with Shoot Ogawa"
- "The Ogawa Opener by Shoot Ogawa"
