= Alan Wakeling =

American musician (1926–2004)

Alan Robert Wakeling
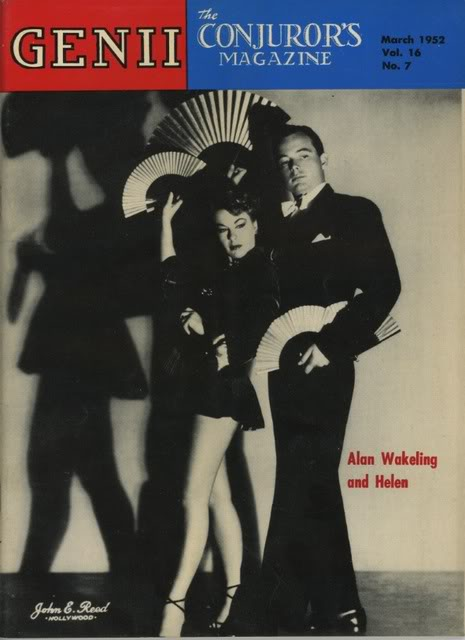
- Alan and his wife Helen posing for the cover of Genii Magazine, March 1952
- Born: Alan Robert Wakeling; 1926; Hollywood, California, US
- Died: 2004 (aged 77–78); Westlake Village, Los Angeles, US
- Education: University of Southern California
- Occupation(s): magician, inventor
- Spouse: Helen Ann Whalen

Alan Robert Wakeling (1926–2004) was an American magician and inventor who is known in the magic world for devising classic illusions and routines used by some of the top performers in the business. Some of his most successful work was done in association with leading television magician Mark Wilson. They worked on the television show The Magic Land of Allakazam, which was sponsored by Kellogg's cereal, and aired on CBS every Saturday from October 1, 1960 then moved to ABC in 1962.

== Early life ==
Wakeling was born in Hollywood, California, but at an early age went to live with his grandparents in Winslow, Arizona, where he grew up during the Great Depression. He took an interest in magic at an early age as the result of seeing travelling magicians who passed through the small town. One that left a particular impression was J. B. Bobo, who performed at his school. In addition he was inspired by finding the work of 19th century magic expert Professor Hoffmann in his local library. Wakeling then began performing magic with improvised props. His family returned to Los Angeles in 1938 and Wakeling later studied drama at the University of Southern California.

== Career ==
Following university, Wakeling did some acting but continued to seek a career in magic. He worked as a demonstrator at two magic shops in Los Angeles, the Thayer Magic Company and the Magic House of Charles. He was also employed by magic inventor and manufacturer Merv Taylor. A chance meeting with magician Roy Benson in the early 1940s gave Wakeling the beginnings on an idea for a routine with billiard balls, which later became something of a signature piece for him. For a while he did an act with long-time friend Marvyn Roy, who later went on to be known as "Mr Electric". Wakeling gradually became a regular performer at clubs in the Los Angeles area, doing a range of acts with titles such as "Rhapsody in Blue" and "Hollywood Cowboy" as well as the "Fan Act", which he began performing with his soon-to-be wife Helen shortly before they were married.

Wakeling worked as a performing magician until 1966 when he began a behind-the-scenes job with Mark Wilson, who had recently become famous across America for transforming magic into a successful format for network television. He was Wilson's creative director for many years, contributing to Wilson's television shows, including Magic Circus, as well as to live productions in Las Vegas and major venues around the world. He also contributed to the work of other famous magicians including Channing Pollock, John Daniel, Marvyn Roy, Norm Nielsen, Dick Zimmerman, Peter Reveen and Earl Nelson. Channing Pollock said of him: "Alan is a one-of-a-kind genius. I see him as one of the best kept secrets in magic, someone who was so good at what he accomplished that you’d want to keep him a secret".

Among Wakeling's inventions is at least one distinctive version of the Sawing a woman in half effect. One version of this illusion, which bears his name, takes certain elements of the first ever sawing trick performed by P.T. Selbit and incorporates them into a new and very effective illusion. However, while Wakeling performed and perfected that variant of the effect, the origins of the so-called "Wakeling Sawing" have been attributed to another magician Virgil Harris Mulkey (aka The Great Virgil), who first performed it in 1942. A version that is fully attributed to Wakeling is the "Double sawing in half" routine for Channing Pollock. Among the illusions he devised for Mark Wilson were Backstage, Girl Through Glass, The Spiker, and Excalibur. He was also responsible for Wilson's "Circus Act" routine, which involved the Gorilla crush illusion.

Wakeling died peacefully on 10 November 2004 in hospital in his hometown of Westlake Village, California and his memorial was held at The Magic Castle in Hollywood, California.

== Awards ==
|1975 - Academy of Magical Art's Creative Fellowship Award |1995 - Academy of Magical Art's Lifetime Achievement Award

== Book ==
- The Magic of Alan Wakeling by Jim Steinmeyer

== Magazines ==
March 1952 - Genii Magazine

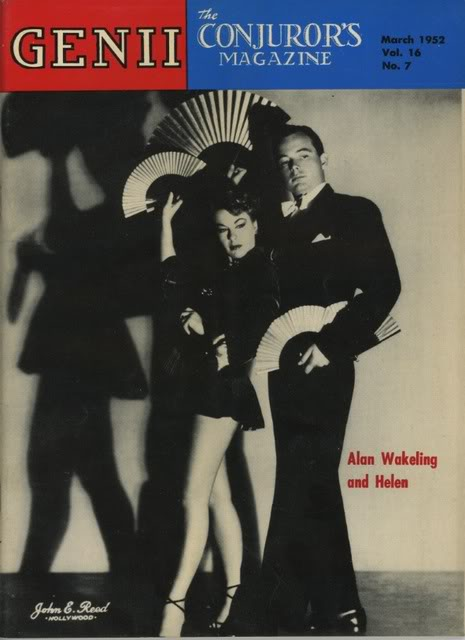

December 1992 - Magic Magazine

September 2007 - Genii Magazine
