= David Kaye (magician) =

Magician and author

David Kaye (born David Friedman) is a professional magician and author. He performs under the stage name Silly Billy.

== Writings ==
He authored a long-running column for Magic magazine entitled, "Turn it around: Magic for the family audience."

- Kid Show Kliff Notes: The Psychology of Performing Magic for Children (notes)
- Running Gags And How To Catch Them (ebook)
- Seriously Silly: How to Entertain Children with Magic and Comedy (2005)
- Serio de Remate (Seriously Silly, Spanish edition)
- Super Sized Silly (2016)

== Personal life ==
Kaye is the son of Arnold and Elaine Friedman. He is the eldest of their three sons. Kaye's younger brothers are Seth and Jesse. He grew up in Flushing, Queens, and then moved to Great Neck, Long Island, with his family when he was a teenager.

In 1987, Kaye's father Arnold and his youngest brother, Jesse, were charged with molesting young boys in computer classes taught in the basement of the Friedmans' Great Neck home. In 1988, Arnold and Jesse pled guilty to child sexual abuse and served time. The case was chronicled in the 2003 documentary Capturing the Friedmans, which Kaye was interviewed for. There was never any inference that Kaye had any knowledge of, or was involved in any way, with the activities of his father and brother.

Kaye adopted his current surname in the 1990s. Kaye's registration of the surname Kaye with the SAG-AFTRA union for his stage name was due to 'David Friedman' being registered with 27 other individuals as of 2003.

Kaye is the foremost children's magician in the United States, author of numerous books including Seriously Silly and Super-Sized Silly, a columnist in both Magic (American magazine) and Genii magazine, and creator of numerous marketed tricks: "Peek-a-Boo Bunny," "Yes, No, Maybe So," "Princess in a Pickle," among others.
