= Harry Lorayne =

American mnemonist, magician, and author (1926–2023)

- Born: Harry Ratzer; May 4, 1926; New York City, New York, U.S.
- Died: April 7, 2023 (aged 96); Newburyport, Massachusetts, U.S.
- Occupations: Mnemonist; magician; author
- Notable work: The Memory Book (1974)
- Spouse: Renée Lorraine Lefkowitz (m. 1948; died 2014)
- Children: 1
- Website: harryloraynemagic.com

Harry Lorayne (born Harry Ratzer; May 4, 1926 – April 7, 2023) was an American mnemonist, magician, and author who was called "The Yoda of Memory Training" and "The World's Foremost Memory-Training Specialist" by Time magazine. He was well known for his incredible memory demonstrations and appeared on numerous television shows–including 24 appearances on The Tonight Show Starring Johnny Carson. His book The Memory Book was a New York Times bestseller. His card magic, especially his innovations in card sleights, is widely emulated by amateur and professional magicians.

== Life and career ==
Lorayne was born Harry Ratzer and grew up poor on New York's Lower East Side. His father was an alcoholic garment cutter and "a violent man" who committed suicide when Lorayne was 12; according to The New York Times:

[W]henever young Harry brought home failing grades on an exam – and because of his dyslexia, he often did – his father beat him. One day, Harry had an epiphany. If only he could learn to memorize, he realized, his problems would end. At the library, he found a shelf of dusty books on memory training, some dating to the 18th century. Most were beyond him, but he fought his way through. Using elementary versions of the techniques he would later employ professionally, he began earning perfect marks.

Lorayne saw his first card trick when he was six or seven years old, and immediately knew he had to figure out how to do it himself. He stole empty milk bottles from in front of apartments in the tenement in which he lived so that he could collect the $.02 deposit on them and be able to afford a deck of cards. He worked at it and figured out eight ways to perform the trick. He practiced sleight of hand at the Hamilton Fish Park in the 1930s. At age 18, he began to perform as a table magician at Billy Reed's Little Club at 70 E. 55th St. in New York. The actor Victor Jory, noted for his role as a magician detective, was a regular visitor to the club. Lorayne started performing memory tricks for Jory and Jory's enthusiastic response changed Lorayne's approach to performing.

Lorayne began appearing on national television in 1958 (after hosting a local show of his own in 1951, The Prof. Magic Show), first on I've Got a Secret, where he demonstrated his ability to remember everybody's name in the audience, and later appeared on The Ed Sullivan Show and numerous other television shows including Jack Paar, The Merv Griffin Show, The Mike Douglas Show, The Regis Philbin Show, Good Morning America, The Today Show, That's Incredible, and David Susskind. He was a regular performer (24 times) on The Tonight Show Starring Johnny Carson.

To demonstrate his memory, Lorayne would stand beside the president of the club he was visiting and be introduced to each member. The number of members of a club could reach up to 1,500. After an hour and a half, Lorayne would speak about memory for about 20 minutes and then ask if anyone had a question. He promised that he would pay any questioner whose name he could not remember a thousand dollars. He always remembered the names of every member of the audience. Lorayne also made news by memorizing and recalling information from phone books with no errors. On just about every public appearance demonstrating his memory abilities, he would meet all the people in the audience as they arrived, and then would open his show by asking all the people he met to please stand. He would ask them to sit down when he pointed to them and correctly said their name, and would usually have the entire audience sitting. He had a memory school in New York employing such instructors as Bob Elliott and Darwin Ortiz. His Memory Power video course was used as part of the training of many top corporations.

Lorayne continued to give lectures and actively wrote books beyond the age of 90. He lived in a townhouse on Jane Street in New York's West Village. The street is sometimes called "Authors Row" due to the many writers who have lived there, and number 62, where Lorayne lived, has also been home to John Cheever, Thomas Meehan, and Susan Brownmiller. According to the New Your Times, "his friend Mel Brooks planned to give that address as the home of the playwright Franz Liebkind in his 1967 film, The Producers. After Mr. Lorayne’s wife, Renée, objected that the moviegoing public would be banging on their door day and night, Mr. Brooks changed it to the fictional 100 West Jane Street."

Lorayne died at a hospital in Newburyport, Massachusetts, on April 7, 2023, at the age of 96. In his obituary, The New York Times wrote that, "Mr. Lorayne’s attainments are all the more noteworthy in light of the fact that he grew up in poverty, struggled academically as a result of undiagnosed dyslexia and concluded his formal education after only a single year of high school."

== Writer and publisher ==
Harry Lorayne was a prolific author of memory training books intended for the public, as well as books for professional magicians. ''The Memory Book'' has sold over two million copies, Bob Dylan writes in Chronicles: Volume One that he read Lorayne's book shortly before breaking through as a music star after finding it in the book collection of a friend.

"Harry Lorayne is the most influential author, publisher, and teacher of magic routines in the world today," according to the magician Randy Wakeman.

For twenty years, Lorayne wrote and published the monthly magazine Apocalypse, which was created and started with Richard J. Kaufman, who left after the first year.

=== Publications ===
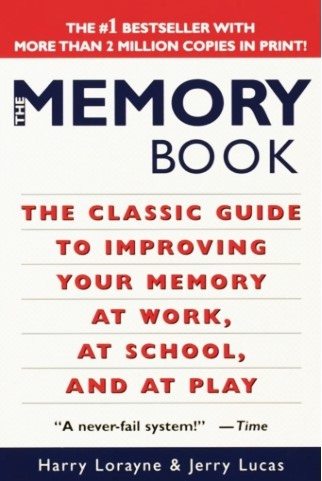
Harry Lorayne / Jerry Lucas: The Memory Book – edition from 1996

- How to Develop a Super Power Memory (1957)
- Harry Lorayne's Secrets of Mind Power (1961)
- Close-Up Card Magic (1962)
- Personal Secrets (1964)
- My Favorite Card Tricks (1965)
- Dingle's Deceptions (1966)
- Miracle Math (1966)
- Best of Bill-Fooled (1967)
- Deck-Sterity (1967)
- The Harry Lorayne Memory Isometrics Course (1968)
- Reputation-Makers (1971)
- Tarbell #7 (1972)
- The Great Divide (1972)
- Good Memory – Good Student! A Guide to Remembering What to Learn (1972)
- Rim Shots (1973)
- The Memory Book: The Classic Guide to Improving Your Memory at Work, at School, and at Play (1974, with Jerry Lucas)
- Afterthoughts (1975)
- The Epitome Location (1976)
- Remembering People (The Key to Success) (1976)
- The Magic Book (1977)
- The Card Classics of Ken Krenzel (1978)
- Quantum Leaps (1979)
- Best of Friends, Vol. 1 (1982)
- Memory Makes Money (1985)
- Best of Friends, Vol. 2 (1985)
- Star Quality (1987)
- Page-a-Minute Memory Book (1987)
- Super Memory – Super Student: How to Raise Your Grades in 30 Days (1990)
- Trend Setters (1990)
- Doug Edwards Packs a Wallop (1997)
- Complete Guide to Memory Mastery (1998)
- The Himber Wallet Book (1998)
- Personal Collection (2001)
- How to Get Rich Using the Power of Your mind (2003)
- The Classic Collection, Volume 1 (contains Close-Up Card Magic, Personal Secrets, My Favorite Card Tricks, Deck-Sterity, The Epitome Location) (2005)
- Ageless Memory: Simple Secrets for Keeping Your Brain Young (2007)
- Best of Friends, Vol. 3 (2007)
- The Classic Collection, Volume 2 (containing Reputation-Makers, Rim Shots, Afterthoughts) (2008)
- The Classic Collection, Volume 3 (contains Quantum Leaps, Trend Setters, Dingle's Deceptions, The Great Divide) (2010)
- Special Effects (2011)
- The Classic Collection, Volume 4 (containing The Magic Book, Star Quality, The Card Classics of Ken Krenzel) (2012)
- Before I Forget (memoirs/autobiography) (2013)
- The Classic Collection, Volume 5 (containing Doug Edwards Packs a Wallop, The Himber Wallet Book, Mathematical Wizardry) (2014)
- Jaw Droppers (2015)
- Jaw Droppers Two (2017)
- And Finally! (2018)

=== Columns ===
- Apocalypse Magazine – 1978–1997
- Genii Magazine

== Awards ==
- Lifetime Achievement Fellowship – Academy of Magic Arts, 2018
- John Nevil Maskelyne Prize – The Magic Circle, 2016. Awarded for contributions to magic literature.
- Performing Fellowship – Academy of Magic Arts, 2002.
- Lifetime Achievement Award – Society of American Magicians, 1994.
- Magician of the Year Award – Society of American Magicians, 1983.
- Literary Fellowship Award – The Magic Castle, 1981.
- Literary & Media Fellowship – Academy of Magic Arts, 1980.
- The Stars of Magic Award – International Brotherhood of Magicians (IBM), 1975.

== See also ==
- Memory sport
- Method of loci
- Mnemonic
- List of people with dyslexia
- Spatial memory
- Vedic Mathematics
