= Ron Wilson (magician) =

Scottish-born magician (1926–2010)

- Born: Ronald Murray Wilson; 1 October 1926; Dundee, Scotland
- Died: 17 December 2010 (aged 84); Los Angeles, California

Ron Wilson (1 October 1926 – 17 December 2010) was a professional magician, and winner of the Academy of Magical Arts Magician of the Year award in 1971.

== Biography ==
Ron Wilson was born in Dundee, Scotland in October 1926. He reported he was attracted to magic by watching Dante the Magician perform in Dundee, and had his first show as a child magician at age nine in an hotel in Ireland. At age 19, he joined a traveling troupe of magicians known as the Dundee Magic Circle, which performed mostly in British small towns.

In 1952, he decided there were better chances of success for his career as a magician in North America, and moved to Windsor, Ontario. He performed there for some years, until he moved to the Magic Castle in Los Angeles, California, where he finally achieved success and international fame. He performed there for several decades, as well as aboard cruise ships, and in world tours that took him to several countries, including China and Russia. Wilson also appeared in several TV shows. He died in Los Angeles on 17 December 2010.

== Bibliography ==
- The Uncanny Scot: Ron Wilson by Richard Kaufman (1987)
- Tales From The Uncanny Scot by Ron Wilson and Steve Mitchell (2010)
