= Pacific Coast Association of Magicians =

Professional association

The Pacific Coast Association of Magicians is an association of magicians. It was founded in 1933; the first president was Lloyd E Jones. It has chapters in Japan, Hawaii, California, and western Canada, and holds an annual convention. The third of these, in 1935, was held at the Knickerbocker Hotel in Hollywood, and was attended by Bess Houdini, widow of Harry Houdini. In 2018 the convention was held in Bakersfield, California.

From September 1936 to August 1937 the magazine Genii, published by William W. Larsen, was the official organ of the association.
