= Robert Albo =

American physician

Robert J. Albo
- Born: May 8, 1932; Oakland, California
- Died: February 21, 2011 (aged 78)
- Education: University of California, Berkeley University of California, San Francisco
- Spouse: Marjorie Jean Stanley (married 1956–2011)
- Children: Bob; Douglas; Debbie

Robert James Albo (May 8, 1932 – February 21, 2011) was an American physician, surgeon and amateur illusionist. He was for 40 years team physician for the Golden State Warriors as well as the Oakland Raiders. At one point he held the largest private magic collection in the world.

== Early life and education ==
Robert Albo was born in Oakland, California, on May 8, 1932, and grew up in Berkeley, California. He attended Berkeley High School, where he played basketball and helped lead the team to Tournament of Champions title in 1949. After high school, he briefly worked as an animator for Walt Disney before studying pre-med at University of California, Berkeley, where he was captain of the basketball and baseball teams. He was offered a contract with the New York Giants, but declined it to pursue a medical career.

== Medical career ==
Albo received his medical education at University of California, San Francisco (UCSF), graduating in 1959. He remained at UCSF for his internship and residency, and later became a professor of surgery there. His first professional job in sports medicine was with the Oakland Seals hockey team. He became team physician for the Golden State Warriors in the early 1970s, and in 1999 became the Warriors' Director of Medicine. He was also the head team physician for the Oakland Raiders and Oakland Oaks (ABA). He specialised in general, vascular, and oncological surgery.

== Magic collection ==
Albo was an amateur illusionist, and held a collection of magic apparatus that grew to be the world's largest, with over 4000 items. Albo used it to write his well regarded series of books, Classic Magic With Apparatus. Originally intended as a trilogy, it eventually grew to 11 volumes. It was followed by further books focused on the magic of Okito and Thayer. In 1992, selected items from the collection were displayed over three of the terminals of San Francisco International Airport. In 1994, Albo agreed to sell the entire collection to David Copperfield, though some items were not transferred to Copperfield until 2010. Albo was a partner in the Palace of Magic shop in San Francisco and Magic Island in Newport Beach, California.

== Bibliography ==
- Classic Magic Series
  - I - The Oriental Magic of the Bambergs (1973) w/ Eric C. Lewis & David Bamberg
  - II - Classic Magic With Apparatus (1976)
  - III - More Classic Magic With Apparatus
  - IV - Further Classic Magic With Apparatus
  - V - Still Further Classic Magic With Apparatus
  - VI - Final Classic Magic With Apparatus
  - VII - Classic Magic Index
  - VIII - Classic Magic Supplement
  - IX - Additional Classic Magic With Apparatus
  - X - History and Mystery of Magic
  - XI - Laboratories of Legerdemain
    - Magic of the United States
    - Magic of France
    - Magic of Germany
    - Magic of England
- The Ultimate Okito
- The Ultimate Okito Addendum
- The Ultimate Okito Encore
- The Ultimate Thayer
- Thoughts on the History and Mystery of Magic

== Awards ==
- The Academy of Magical Arts Special Fellowship (1983)
- The Academy of Magical Arts Literary & Media Fellowship (1988)
- The John Neville Maskelyne Prize 1989
