= Michael Finney (magician) =

American professional Magician

Michael Finney is a professional magician. He was born in 1954 in Woodland, California. He moved to Phoenix, Arizona in 1978 and opened the Finney Bones comedy club in 1986. He has appeared on numerous television specials and performs regularly throughout the U.S. He has appeared on the cover of The Linking Ring. Finney began his performing career while working as a bartender in Phoenix, where he learned magic tricks to entertain customers. He later incorporated stand-up comedy into his magic act and began performing professionally in comedy clubs. In 1986, he became a finalist on the television talent show Star Search. He subsequently appeared on several television programs, including Comic Strip Live, and received recognition for his comedy magic performances. In 1992, the Los Angeles Times profiled Finney's career, describing his combination of comedy and magic in performances at comedy clubs.

== Biography ==
After spending part of his early career as a close-up magician and a children's performer at a theme park, Finney decided to concentrate strictly on comedy magic.

Once a comedy finalist on the television program Star Search, Finney was nominated for 'Magician of the Year' by the Magic Castle nightclub in Los Angeles, performed at the 2004 Inaugural Gala for President George W Bush, and received the Silver Lion Head award for excellence in comedy and magic from magicians Siegfried and Roy.

=== NBC ===
Once a regular performer on NBC's World's Greatest Magicians and World's Wildest Magic shows, Finney now performs primarily one day corporate events, charity events, and at casinos.

Finney is one of only a few magicians with their own foundation —- the Michael Finney Foundation to benefit firefighters and the Pappas School for homeless children. In eight years, his foundation donated over $400,000 to his causes, according to Finney's estimate. He stated in a 2005 interview that he was also associated with the Gift of Life, a Rotarian group that provides assistance and operations for children with heart problems. He is currently involved with the Wounded Warriors program, having contributed almost a million dollars through his foundation.
