= Michael Weber (magician) =

American magician and illusionist

Michael Weber (born 1961 in Southern California) is an American magician, illusionist, and magic consultant best known for his work in film, television, and theater. He lent his expertise to numerous films, collaborating with his close friend and business partner Ricky Jay. In 1981 he won the Junior Achievement Award and in 2009 a Creative Fellowship, both from the Academy of Magical Arts.

== Early life and training ==
Weber discovered magic as a teenager and became a member of the Junior Society of the Magic Castle in Hollywood at age 14. He studied card magic under sleight‑of‑hand artist Charlie Miller, which helped shape his highly technical, mystery‑oriented style.

== Career and consulting work ==
In 1993 Weber co‑founded Deceptive Practices with fellow magician Ricky Jay. Among the productions they worked on were the films Ocean's Thirteen (2007), The Prestige (2006), The Illusionist (2006 film) (2006), Heartbreakers (2001), The Parent Trap (1998), Forrest Gump (1994), Wolf (1994), I Love Trouble (1994), Congo (1995), and Sneakers (1992) as well as and the Broadway production of Angels in America: Perestroika.

He worked worked on early David Blaine television specials and later with the touring company of Beetlejuice.

== Philosophy and legacy ==
Weber is widely regarded as a “magician’s magician,” admired by peers for his understanding of psychology, misdirection, and the protection of magic’s secrets.
