= Michael Ammar =

American close-up magician

- Ammar in 2011
- Born: June 25, 1956 (age 70); Logan, West Virginia
- Occupation: Magician
- Known for: Magic and Magic Training
- Website: http://www.ammarmagic.com/, http://www.michaelammar.com, http://worldsgreatestmagic.com

Michael Ammar (born June 25, 1956) is an American close-up magician.

== Background ==
Ammar was born in Logan, West Virginia. His father's background was Syrian.

Ammar earned a degree from West Virginia University in business administration in 1978.

== Magician ==
In 1982, Ammar competed with magicians from 30 countries to win first prize ex aequo with Aurelio Pavito in Close-up Magic at Lausanne, Switzerland.

During the 1980s he developed a close friendship with his mentor, Dai Vernon ("The Professor"), whose influence is apparent in Ammar's performances.

Ammar was the magic week finale on Late Night with David Letterman in 2010 and has made multiple appearances on The Tonight Show. He moved to Los Angeles - where he became a regular performer at the Playboy Mansion, and made appearances on the Merv Griffin Show, The Tonight Show, CNN, and Travel Channel.

Ammar appeared at the Magic Castle in Hollywood.. By 1990, the Academy of Magical Arts in Hollywood had awarded him its "Oscar" in six separate categories (the maximum number of awards for which he is eligible).

He appeared on NBC's 1998 "Worlds Greatest Magic 5" special, and has been a guest on the Late Show with David Letterman.

Ammar has made private performances at Universal Studios and the Vatican. He performed and coordinated the magic talent at George W. Bush's Presidential inaugural banquet. He was the first featured performer at the "Caesars Magical Empire" at Caesars Palace.

Ammar has performed on television in England, France, Canada, Japan, Sweden, Norway, Australia and Russia.

Ammar's work includes the popularization of Topit, with his refinement of Topit technique and inspired a number of close-up magicians to adopt it. He has written "The Topit Book" and made "The Topit DVD".

== Magic Instructor ==
Ammar has been lecturing to other magicians since about 1982.

In 1999, Magic Magazine named Ammar as "One of the Most Influential Magicians in the Twentieth Century".

On August 26, 2010, Outside cited Ammar as the "go-to source" for magic instruction. The magazine published a list of "100 Things to Do Before You Die", and numbered 45 as "Learn a magic trick"—suggesting studying with the master, Michael Ammar.

== Publications ==
- “Michael Ammar Live Act (Penguin Live)”
- “Michael Ammar Live (Penguin Live)”
- “At the Table Live with Michael Ammar”
- "The Topit Book"
- "Success and Magic"
- "Videonics videos with Dai Vernon"
- "Encore 1"
- "Encore 2"
- "Encore 3"
- "The Magical Arts Journal"
- "Brainstorm in the Bahamas"
- "The Magic Video"
- "Making Magic Memorable"
- "Negotiating Higher Performance Fees"
- "Restaurant Magic Business"
- "The Magic of Michael Ammar"
- "The Crazyman's Handcuffs"
- "Easy to Master Card Miracles, Vol 1-9"
- "Easy to Master Money Miracles, Vol 1-3"
- "Easy to Master Thread Miracles, Vol 1-3"
- "Easy to Master Business Card Miracles"
- "The Topit DVD"
- "Exciting World of Magic"
- "The Little Hand"
- "Amazing Secrets of Card Magic"
- "Complete Introduction to Coin Magic"
- "Icebreakers"
- "Classic Renditions 1 - The Floating Bill"
- "Classic Renditions 2 - Rubber Band Magic"
- "Classic Renditions 3 - The Thumbtip Bill Switch"
- "Classic Renditions 4 - Roll Over Aces"
- "Live at the Magic Castle"
- "The New Topit Pattern"
- "Any Signed Card to Any Spectators Wallet"
- "Cups to Lemon"

== Awards ==
- Distinguished Alumni Award from West Virginia University 2003
- Magician of the Year, Tannens, NY 2000
- Best Close Up Magic, World Magic Awards, 1999
- Gold Medalist, World Sleight-of-Hand Competition, FISM, 1982
- Best Sleight-of-Hand, International Magic Awards, 1991
- Best Sleight-of-Hand, International Magic Awards, 1992
- The Academy of Magical Arts Parlour Magician of the Year (1985, 1990)
- The Academy of Magical Arts Close-Up Magician of the Year (1981, 1983)
- The Academy of Magical Arts Lecturer of the Year (1982, 1983)
