= John Shrum =

American Art Director (1927–1988)

John Shrum (1927 – September 10, 1988) was an NBC Television Senior Art Director.

John Shrum was born in Los Angeles, California and attended the Chouinard Art Institute. Upon graduation, he became involved in the advent of television at KTLA-TV studios. This led to John's move to NBC Television as an Art Director.

John Shrum was Art Director for Ralph Edwards' Truth or Consequences. He was the original Art Director for Days of Our Lives when the legendary NBC soap opera went on the air in 1965. Shrum also served as Art Director for other NBC television specials including the Emmy Award winning Alice In Wonderland. Later John became Art Director for Johnny Carson and The Tonight Show on NBC, when Carson first came to Burbank, California for a West Coast broadcast of the nightly hour and a half show which followed the NBC Eleven O'Clock News each evening. So impressed with Shrum's work was the TV Host that he asked the Network executive to make him a permanent part of The Tonight Show staff. Shrum won an Emmy and numerous nominations for his work on this show.

Away from NBC, John collaborated with Milt Larsen on the entrepreneur's world-renowned Hollywood private magicians club The Magic Castle, Mayfair Music Hall Santa Monica, California, and the grand deco Variety Arts Center in downtown Los Angeles, California.

Shrum died of a heart attack in 1988.
