= Eugene Burger =

American magician (1939–2017)

- Born: June 1, 1939; Chicago, Illinois
- Died: August 8, 2017 (aged 78); Chicago, Illinois

Eugene Burger (June 1, 1939 – August 8, 2017) was an American magician. He was born in 1939 and was based in Chicago, Illinois. He was acclaimed for his close-up skills and his work in mentalism and bizarre magic.

Burger was also a philosopher and a historian of religion. He had degrees in philosophy and earned a Bachelor of Divinity degree in 1964 from Yale University and taught university courses in comparative religion and philosophy.

Burger frequently taught at the McBride Magic & Mystery School in Las Vegas, Nevada.

He was the author of books on the presentation of close up magic and was featured on several instructional DVDs and videos for magicians. He produced an audio program called Growing in the Art of Magic.

Burger died of cancer in Chicago on August 8, 2017. He was 78.

== Books and DVDs ==
- Final Secrets by Dr. Larry Hass and Eugene Burger (2021)
- Eugene Burger: From Beyond by Dr. Larry Hass and Eugene Burger (2019)
- Teaching Magic by Eugene Burger and Dr. Larry Hass (2017)
- Eugene Burger LIVE 2 (Penguin LIVE) (2016)
- Eugene Burger LIVE (Penguin LIVE) (2015)
- Reel Magic, Ep. 12 (2012)
- Mastering the Art of Magic (2011)
- Gift Magic: Performances that Leave People with a Souvenir (2010)
- Meaning and Magic with Robert E. Neale (expanded) (2009)
- A Magical Vision (Documentary on Eugene Burger, written and directed by Michael Caplan) (2008)
- Eugene Burger Presents Exploring Magical Presentation (2007)
- Mystery School by Eugene Burger and Jeff McBride (2003)
- Eugene Burger's Magical Voyages, Vol 1-3 (2001)
- Mastering the Art of Magic (2000)
- Solomon’s Mind: The Card Mysteries of David Solomon (1997)
- Gourmet Close-Up Magic (1995)
- Rediscoveries: New Ways of Framing Old Favorites (1994)
- Strange Ceremonies (1991)
- Eugene Goes Bizarre (1990)
- The Experience of Magic (1989)
- The Performance of Close-Up Magic (1987)
- Spirit Magic (1987)
- Spirit Theater (1986)
- The Craft of Magic & Other Writings (1984)
- Intimate Power (1983)
- The Secrets of Restaurant Magic (1983)
- On Matt Schulien’s Fabulous Card Discoveries (1983)
- Audience Involvement: A Lecture (1983)
- Secrets and Mysteries for the Close-Up Entertainer (1982)

== Notable appearances in print ==
In February 1982, Burger was featured on the cover of The Linking Ring. Then in October 1986, he was featured on the cover of M-U-M, the monthly publication of the Society of American Magicians. Five years later, in May 1991, he was featured on the cover of Genii (magazine). Eighteen years after that, Burger was featured on the cover of The Magic Circular in May 2009, the monthly publication of The Magic Circle (organisation). Four years later, Burger again was featured on the cover of Genii (magazine) in October 2013. Four years later, in October 2017, Genii (magazine) published a feature article on Burger, written by Dr. Larry Hass.

== Awards ==
Burger was considered "one of the 100 most influential magicians of the 20th century" by MAGIC Magazine.

In 2012, the Fédération Internationale des Sociétés Magiques (FISM) presented him with a special award for Magic Theory.
