= Franz Czeisler =

Hungarian circus performer

- Born: Ferenc Czeisler Deutch; June 29, 1916; Kétegyháza, Hungary
- Died: March 2, 2016 (aged 99); Las Vegas, Nevada
- Other names: Mr. Tihany
- Spouse: Ilona Kovacs (1935-?)
- Children: 1

Franz Czeisler (also known as The Great Tihany, June 29, 1916 – March 2, 2016) was a Hungarian circus impresario and illusionist.

Czeisler got his first job in the circus at the age of 12, feeding the animals.

In 1953, Czeisler travelled to Brazil with his wife and son and purchased a big top, which he used to start a circus. This eventually became the Circus Tihany, named after a town on Lake Balaton, Hungary. Tihany Magic Circus toured every country in Central and South America for over 40 years.

== Awards ==
- The Academy of Magical Arts Lifetime Achievement Fellowship (2001)
