= Dick Zimmerman =

American magician

Charles Richard “Dick” Zimmerman
- Born: August 11, 1937 (age 88); Charleston, West Virginia, US
- Occupation: Pianist
- Years active: 1973–present
- Works: Scott Joplin: His Complete Works; The Collector’s History of Ragtime
- Spouse: Diane Zimmerman
- Awards: Scott Joplin Award; International Ragtime-Jasstime Foundation Lifetime Achievement Award; PCAM contest trophies for originality (1956-63); 1968 Academy of Magical Arts - Best Lecturer; 1986 Academy of Magical Arts - Award of Merit

Richard “Dick” Zimmerman (born August 11, 1937) is a ragtime performer, historian, author and producer. He is regarded as being one of the key figures responsible for the worldwide revival of ragtime. Zimmerman is the first pianist to have recorded the complete works of Scott Joplin and in 1987 was awarded the first place prize “Champion Ragtime Performer of the World”. Zimmerman was technical advisor for the film Scott Joplin. He is a founder of the "Maple Leaf Club", and is the editor of its publication, "The Rag Times". Zimmerman is also a professional magician. He has contributed many signature illusions to the field of magic and has acted as consultant for such magicians as David Copperfield.

== Life and career ==
Zimmerman was trained as a child in classical music, but quickly abandoned his studies to pursue his love for ragtime when his magic teacher played a record by "one of the great American composers, Scott Joplin."

In 1956 he enrolled at Stanford University where he received degrees in civil and mechanical engineering. Zimmerman later went on to design games for Mattel, Inc. As a freshman, a classmate introduced him to the rags of Scott Joplin. But it wasn’t until 1973, when the movie The Sting began the revival of ragtime with a musical score by Marvin Hamlisch, which adapted the original rags of Scott Joplin, that Zimmerman turned his attention to performing and recording. In 1974, he released the five-LP collection ‘’Scott Joplin: His Complete Works’’ on the Murray Hill Records label. The collection was later issued as a 4-CD set on the Bescol label (BSCD 4/4).

In 1967 Zimmerman, along with Dave Bourne, Albert Huerta, Chuck McClure, and Bill Mitchell, founded the ‘’Maple Leaf Club’’, for which he edited its newsletter, "The Rag Times". In 1998 the ‘’Maple Leaf Club’’ merged with the ‘’Rose Leaf Club’’.

As a producer, Zimmerman created the ragtime concert series ‘’Where It Was!’’ in Los Angeles. The venue featured ragtime stars from both the past and present, including such legends as pianist and composer Eubie Blake, who once said of Zimmerman: "[Dick] is a real ragtime pianist, and he knows more about its history than I do!"

Zimmerman has appeared in concert and at music festivals throughout the United States and Canada. He has appeared on The Tonight Show with Johnny Carson, PBS, BBC-TV, BBC World Service Radio, as well as the Canadian Broadcasting Co. and Australia Broadcasting. He has performed in concert at the Montreal International Jazz Festival in Canada and the Montreux Jazz Festival in Switzerland. He has also served as long-time musical director of the "Scott Joplin Ragtime Festival in Sedalia, Missouri". He was the recipient of the Scott Joplin Foundation Achievement Award in 1991.

Today, Zimmerman runs "American Ragtime Co.", recording and publishing ragtime classics and the works of early 20th century blues composers.

== Magic career ==
Zimmerman is known for originating many illusions in the field of magic. He was a member of the Academy of Magical Arts Board, located at The Magic Castle in Los Angeles, California, and also the Director of AMA's annual "It's Magic" show. Dick and his wife Diane Zimmerman performed together as a husband-and-wife team in several magic acts, including one televised segment on the Merv Griffin Show.

== Zimmerman Illusions ==
- Zimmerman Linking Hula Hoops
- Prediction System
- Dancing Ring on Rope
- Crystal Clear Card Box
- Clearly Impossible
- Zimmer Egg
- Zimmer Stab
- Sure Thing
- Rough and Ready (Again)
- Plonk/Zimmer Shaker
- Rattled
- Digital Delusion

== Discography ==
- Scott Joplin - His Complete Works – Label: Murray Hill Records (Murray Hill Records 931079) (1974)
- Scott Joplin, The Entertainer - Label: Olympic Records (1974)
- The Collector's History of Ragtime – Label: Murray Hill Records (1980)
- Ragtime - Label: Music For Pleasure (1984)
- Roots of Ragtime - Label: Madacy (1994)
- King of Ragtime – Label: Delta Distribution (1995)
- Gems of Texas Ragtime – Label: American Ragtime Company (1997)
- Long Lost Blues - Label: PianoMania Music (1997)
- Scott Joplin's Greatest Hits - Label: Legacy International (2009)
- Ragtime Favorites – Label: American Ragtime

== Television appearances ==
- "The Minstrel Man" (CBS)
- "The Tonight Show" (NBC)

== Additional links ==
- MagicPedia - Dick Zimmerman
- List of Zimmerman's CDs
- Merv Griffin Appearance
