= John Carney (magician) =

American sleight of hand artist, author and comic actor

- Born: January 23, 1958 (age 67); Des Moines, Iowa
- Occupation: Magician
- Years active: 1980s-present

John Carney (born January 23, 1958, in Des Moines, Iowa) is a professional sleight-of-hand artist, author and comic actor. He won various awards from the Academy of Magical Arts, including "stage magician of the year", "close-up magician of the year", and "parlour magician of the year". In 1988 and 1991, he won first and second place, respectively, in "micro magic" at the world Fédération Internationale des Sociétés Magiques championships. Carney studied under sleight of hand magician Dai Vernon.

Carney's performances include corporate speaking and entertainment for parties and other events, as well as his theatre show, Carney's Wonders. He has performed in casinos in Atlantic City, Lake Tahoe and Las Vegas. He has also appeared on The Jerry Seinfeld HBO Special and CBS Magicians Favorite Magicians, David Letterman's Late Show, and has served as a spokesman for MasterCard, performing magic for their national television commercials.

Carney is also a teacher of magic, having lectured and conducted seminars around the world. He has written five books, Carney Knowledge (1983), Carneycopia (1991), The Book of Secrets (2002), Magic By Design (2009), and Wizard Academy.

Carney currently resides in Los Angeles, California.
