= Genii (magazine) =

Magic magazine

Genii, The Conjuror's Magazine
- January 2012 (Vol 75, No. 1) issue
- Editor: Richard Kaufman
- Former editors: Bill Larsen, Jr. & Irene Larsen (1953-1990); Dante Larsen (1990-1993); Dante Larsen & Erika Larsen (1993-1994); Erika Larsen (1994-1998)
- Categories: Magic
- Frequency: Monthly
- Circulation: 9,000
- Publisher: The Genii Corporation
- Founder: William Larsen, Sr.
- First issue: September 1, 1936
- Company: Pitchford Entertainment, Media and Magic
- Country: USA
- Based in: Washington, DC
- Language: English
- Website: geniimagazine.com
- ISSN: 0016-6855

Genii, The Conjurors' Magazine is a magazine devoted to magic and magicians. It is a monthly magazine first published in September 1936, currently edited by Richard J. Kaufman and owned by Randy Pitchford. The magazine is based in Washington, DC.

== History ==
Genii was founded by William Larsen, Sr. in 1936, and it was published as the official organ of the Pacific Coast Association of Magicians, which had been founded in 1933. The original print run was 750 copies, which went down to 500 for the second and third issues. Upon Larsen's death in 1953 it was subsequently edited and published by his wife Gerrie Larsen, son William Larsen, Jr. and his wife Irene Larsen, grandson Dante Larsen, and granddaughter Erika Larsen. In 1998, it was sold to The Genii Corporation headed by magic author Richard Kaufman.

Genii appears as both a conventionally printed magazine and a digital edition, which includes audio and video supplements. Subscribers also receive free access to all 77 years of Genii's back issues.

From March 1942–June 1947, M-U-M, the periodical of the Society of American Magicians, was published as part of Genii.

In 2013, The Academy of Magical Arts, located at The Magic Castle in Los Angeles, started providing paid subscriptions of Genii to all of its magician members.

== Contributors ==
Genii's roster of columnists have included: David Britland, Eugene Burger, Al Cohen, Dani DaOrtiz, John Gaughan, Andi Gladwin, Roberto Giobbi, Helder Guimaraes David Kaye, Ian Kendall, Chris Kenner, Homer Liwag, Max Maven, Jon Racherbaumer, Jim Steinmeyer, Dustin Stinett, Tom Stone, Daniel Ulin, and Caleb Wiles.

Genii's team of critics for new books and products are currently: David Britland, John Lovick, Will Houstoun, Eric Mead, Danny Orleans, David Regal, Dustin Stinett, and Joe M. Turner.

Past columnists have included Dai Vernon, Charlie Miller, Jules Lenier, Guy Hollingworth, Luke Jermay, Harry Lorayne, David Acer, Michael Close, Bob Farmer, James Swain, Paul Cummins, and Jamy Ian Swiss.

== See also ==
- List of magic publications
