= Aldo Colombini =

American magician, lecturer, author and media producer

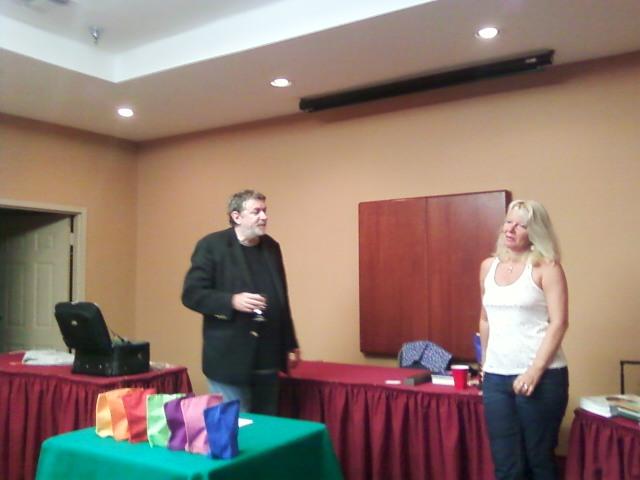
- Aldo (left) and his wife, Rachel, lecturing for a magic club in Longview, Texas in Spring 2011
- Born: Modena, Italy; March 19, 1951
- Died: February 12, 2014 (aged 62)

Aldo Colombini (19 March 1951 – 12 February 2014) was an Italian-born magician, lecturer, author and media producer. At the time of his death he was married to Rachel Colombini (previously known as Rachel Wild, Rachel Fenton and Rachel Jones), also a magician. Rachel died circa 2018, after rumors of her death circulated on the internet in 2017. When he first moved to the United States (from his native Modena, Italy) in 1993, he spoke no English. He created and marketed hundreds of magic tricks, along with numerous books and instructional videos on the topic of magic. He wrote a long-running column for The Linking Ring magazine, entitled, "As Always, Aldo".

== Books/Writing ==
- "The Close-up Magic of Aldo Colombini"
- What's Up Deck?
- He contributed multiple articles to Harry Lorayne's long-running journal, Apocalypse.
- Tra La Via Emilia e il West con un Mazzo di Carte (Ebook)
- i Tre Orsacchiotti (Ebook)
- Matrix per Gente Pigra (Ebook)
- Incredibili Illusioni Improvvisate (Ebook)
- E Adesso cosa Dico? (Ebook)
- Carte Diem (Ebook)
- Il Giocoliere Comico (Ebook)
- Alta quota (Ebook)
- Un Comico Taglio (Ebook)
- Gorgo'n Zola (Ebook)
- Il Segno Dei Cinque (Ebook)
- il Libro Dei Book Test (Ebook)
- pronto intervento (Ebook)

== Instructional Videos ==
Aldo has made or has appeared in the following instructional videos:

- Card Festival (DVD & VOD formats)
- Still Ringing Around (DVD and VOD formats)
- Roped In
- ESP Card Magic 1 - 20
- Self Working Packet Tricks
- Green Carpet
- Fireworks
- Aldo On Trost 1 - 15
- Essentials 1 - 3
- Jumbo Coincidence
- Razzamataz
- Magic Italian Style
- Packet Tricks Picks
- Impromptu Card Magic 1 - 6
- A Few Good Cards
- True Magic 1 - 2
- Still Ringing Around
- Three Ring Concerto
- Tested Ten Card Poker Deal
- Card Capers
- All Hands on Deck
- Jack in the Box
- Card Festival
- Karl Fulves The Epilogue
- Tricks to Go
- Amazing Self Working Card Magic 1 - 2
- Stunning Card Magic by Richard Vollmer and Aldo Colombini
- Please Hold

== Notable Performances ==
- In 2006 he was the Guest of Honor at Fechter's Finger-Flicking Frolic - The Original Close-Up Convention, a prestigious annual invitation-only convention limited to 200 participants.
- Aldo was a featured performer at the annual convention for the Society of American Magicians in 2006, where a local news reporter described him as possessing, "... a distinctive sense of humor delivered in a delicious Italian accent."
- He performed in the close-up gallery at the International Brotherhood of Magicians' 64th annual convention held in Norfolk, Virginia.
- In 1995 he performed at the Louisiana Magic Weekend convention (hosted by IBM Ring 27).
