= Billy McComb =

British magician

- Born: April 12, 1922; Belfast, Northern Ireland
- Died: April 30, 2006 (aged 84); Los Angeles, California, U.S.

Billy McComb (April 12, 1922 – April 30, 2006) was a British-born American magician and comedian. He was one of the United Kingdom's leading magicians in the 1950s and 1960s. He moved to Los Angeles, California in the 1970s. He joined The Magic Castle in Hollywood, his number being 3323.

== Early life ==
McComb was born in Belfast, Northern Ireland, the son of a physician who was knighted for his contribution to X-ray research. He was educated at Portora Royal School, Enniskillen. He then trained for a career in medicine at Queen's University, Belfast. He graduated as a doctor in 1949.

== Entertainer ==
McComb decided to develop a talent he discovered at school as a magician and comedian. He made a name for himself in Ireland, then started working in London in the West End cabaret scene. He married June Cochrane, a former Miss Ireland, and they became a performing duo. He performed before Queen Elizabeth II at a Royal Variety Performance in the early years of his career. He then began working as a magician and comedian performer aboard cruise ships internationally, with his magician's assistant, Mindy Masters. It was during this era of his career that his travels brought him to the United States. After he went to Hollywood, he made over three hundred appearances on television and in movies. He appeared in a number of television series and also opened for such stars as Bob Hope. One role was Walter Wilder in the 1995 film Lord of Illusions, directed by Clive Barker. He also appeared in the 1987 TV film Young Harry Houdini. He became a prominent figure at The Magic Castle and was billed as "The Worlds Largest Leprechaun." In 1964 he was invited to join the Entertainment charitable fraternity, the Grand Order of Water Rats.

In his 80s he continued to perform regularly in Las Vegas and as an opening act for The Amazing Johnathan. In his later years his act was noted for his self-deprecating jokes. In his opening he would look at his watch and say, "It's either this or rice pudding night at the home."

Books he wrote include The Professional Touch and Mc Comb's Magic: 25 Years Wiser. He was a prolific inventor of magic and illusions, known for creating such items as the "Mc Combical Deck" and the "Double Thin Model Sawing" routine, in which two assistants are sawed in half, and the halves of the two assistants are switched. He was sought after by many as the answer man in magic when a magician was having difficulty locating or developing a particular routine.

Billy McComb died on April 12, 2006, aged 84, in Los Angeles, predeceased by his son, Sean McComb, who died in 2002. His widow, June McComb, died in 2007.
