= John Lovick =

John Lovick may refer to:

- John Lovick (magician)
- John Lovick (politician)
