= Max Maven =

American magician and mentalist (1950–2022)

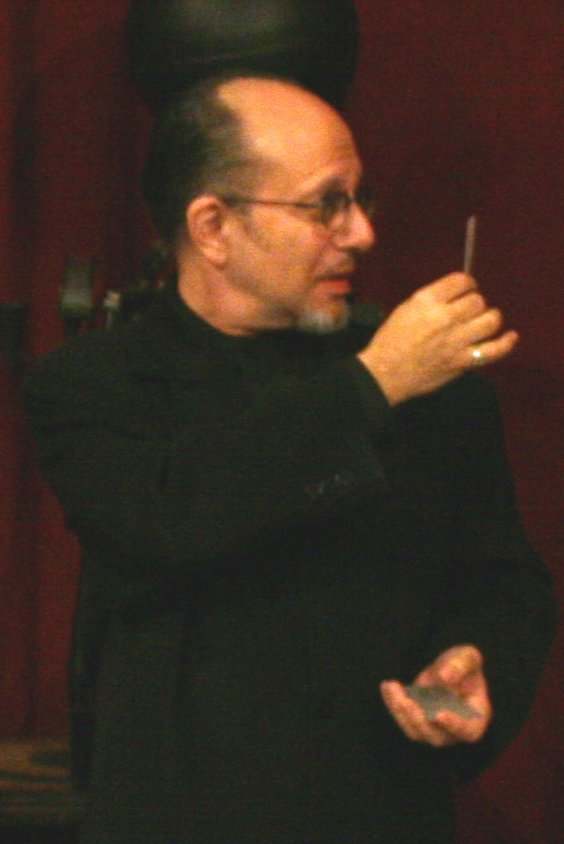
- Maven performing an ESP card trick, 2007
- Born: Philip T. Goldstein; December 21, 1950; Ithaca, New York, U.S.
- Died: November 1, 2022 (aged 71); Los Angeles, California, U.S.
- Occupations: Illusionist, mentalist
- Awards: Academy of Magical Arts Creative Fellowship, MINDVention Lifetime Achievement Award, The Allan Slaight Award for Lifetime Achievement

Max Maven (born Philip T. Goldstein; December 21, 1950 – November 1, 2022) was an American illusionist and mentalist whose performances were considered erudite and intelligent. He is ranked as one of the most influential mentalists of all time, and one of the 100 "Most Influential Magicians of the 20th Century" by Magic Magazine.

== Life, career, and death ==
Maven was born to a Jewish family in Ithaca, New York. His mother studied Chinese art and his father was an astrophysicist.

Maven often appeared on television magic shows to perform "interactive" mind reading tricks, namely tricks where he appeared to predict or influence the choices of viewers in real time. Maven grew up largely in Boston, where he became known for his performances at several nightspots including the then popular Playboy Club. In Boston, he was once a radio deejay.

Maven was also a prolific author and conceived many magical and mentalist effects used by other magicians. He was a magic consultant for such performers as Harry Blackstone Jr., Mark Wilson, David Copperfield, Penn & Teller, Siegfried & Roy, and Doug Henning, and was a frequent contributor to industry journals such as Genii, The Linking Ring, and M-U-M.

Maven was featured on the cover of over 30 such magazines over the years, including The Linking Ring, Genii in 1983 (with Japanese magician Shigeo Takagi), and also in 2007 and in 2018, and on the cover of Penguin Magic Monthly in 2019. He was the featured magician at the annual conventions of both the Society of American Magicians and the International Brotherhood of Magicians.

His name was changed legally to Maven but he still used "Phil Goldstein" as a pen name for technical writings.

Maven had a broad knowledge of magic history and the origins of various tricks and methods. He stated that he believed it vital to preserve the history of the art and provide credit to the originators of ideas.

Maven died from brain cancer on November 1, 2022, at the age of 71.

== Media and public appearances ==
Although Maven did not consider himself a comedian, he spent much of the 1980s performing and headlining in comedy clubs throughout the United States.

His one man show, Thinking in Person, ran for two months at the Beverly Hills Playhouse in 1988, and an expanded version of the show was relaunched twenty years later in 2008. The show was later mounted off-Broadway at the Abingdon Theatre Arts Complex in 2012.

Maven occasionally played a magician character (often as himself) on various television series, such as Magic, The Art of Magic and The MAXimum Dimension. He appeared in television series in Sweden, Norway, Finland, Taiwan, United Kingdom, Canada, Spain, Portugal, and Chile.

Maven appeared as a part of the traveling science exhibit called "Magic: The Science of Illusion" and the "Magic of the Mind Illusion", which toured in science museums in cities such as Los Angeles and Boston. He performed often in Japan and spoke Japanese.

Maven was a frequent speaker at the EG Conference on creativity and innovation.

Maven starred as the title role in FOX's 1992 Halloween special Count DeClues' Mystery Castle. His performed his interactive magic on The World's Greatest Magic, NBC's highest rated special of 1994.

Maven hosted his own show on Israel's Channel 2, a licensed version of Penn & Teller: Fool Us called Mi Yapil Et Ha Master (Who Can Fool The Master?). He was a judge for a number of episodes of the 2008 reality TV series Celebracadabra.

Maven appeared in sitcoms and television dramas, including as "The Great Mentos" in the 1995 Fresh Prince of Bel Air episode "Save the Last Trance for Me", the 1982 episode of Mork & Mindy entitled "Drive, She Said", and episodes of General Hospital and Top Chef.

In 2019, he appeared on screen in the documentary about The Amazing Johnathan directed by Ben Berman and was interviewed by the Los Angeles Times about recent developments at the Magic Castle.

The well-reviewed feature documentary entitled Max Maven: A Fabulous Monster was released in 2007 by Reel Time Images. It is available for streaming on Amazon Prime.

== Awards and recognition ==
Max Maven received a number of awards for his creativity and performance, including awards from the Society of American Magicians, International Brotherhood of Magicians, and the Academy of Magical Arts. In addition, he received the following recognitions:

- Academy of Magical Arts Lecturer of the Year, 1979
- Academy of Magical Arts Creative Fellowship, 1997
- The Magic Woods Award for Best Teaching Video for his mentalism DVD "Nothing", 2007.
- MINDVention Lifetime Achievement Award, 2015
- The Allan Slaight Award for Lifetime Achievement, 2017.
- Academy of Magical Arts Masters Fellowship, 2022

== Selected works ==
- Max Maven's Book of Fortunetelling
- VideoMind - Phases 1-3: Mentalism (3 volume DVD)
- Prism: The Color Series of Mentalism
- Nothing (2 DVD Set)
- Kayfabe (4 DVD Set)
- Max Maven's Mindgames (video)
- The New Magic of Japan (translator)
