= Val Andrews (author) =

Ventriloquist, writer

Val Andrews (15 February 1926 – 12 December 2006) was a music hall artist, ventriloquist, and writer.

Andrews was born in Hove, Sussex, England a few hours after Valentine's Day, hence his name. Son of an architect, he was introduced to magic by his father. Andrews was a prolific writer on magic, having published over 1000 books and booklets from 1952. He also authored Sherlock Holmes pastiches and Houdini's novels. He lived for a number of years in Brighton, then in London (from 1943 onwards) where he joined the London Society of Magicians.

== Awards ==
- The John Nevil Maskelyne Prize (2000)

== Bibliography ==
=== Autobiography ===
- Dedicated Magic (1971)
- Four seasons in the life of Val Andrews (1984)

=== Sherlock Holmes novels ===
- Sherlock Holmes and the Eminent Thespian (1988)
- Sherlock Holmes and the Brighton Pavilion Mystery (1989)
- Sherlock Holmes and the Egyptian Hall Adventure (1993)
- Sherlock Holmes and the Houdini Birthright (1995)
- Sherlock Holmes and the Yule-tide Mystery (1996)
- Sherlock Holmes and the Man Who Lost Himself (1996)
- Sherlock Holmes and the Baker Street Dozen (1997)
- Sherlock Holmes and the Circus of Fear (1997)
- Sherlock Holmes and the Greyfriars School Mystery (1997)
- Sherlock Holmes and the Theatre of Death (1997)
- Sherlock Holmes and the Sandringham House Mystery (1998)
- Sherlock Holmes and the Tomb of Terror (1999)
- Sherlock Holmes on the Western Front (1999)
- Sherlock Holmes at the Varieties (1999)
- The Torment of Sherlock Holmes (1999)
- Sherlock Holmes and the Longacre Vampire (2000)
- Sherlock Holmes and the Holborn Emporium (2001)
- Sherlock Holmes and the Secret Seven (2001)
- The Ghost of Baker Street (2006)
- The Prince of Ventriloquists: Another Case for Sherlock Holmes (2006; Audio CD)
- Sherlock Holmes and the Hilldrop Crescent Mystery (2011)
- Sherlock Holmes and the Charlie Chaplin Affair (2020)
