= Al Cohen (magician) =

American magician (1926–2020)

- Born: Alfred Lee Cohen; January 11, 1926; Wilmington, Delaware
- Died: December 13, 2020 (aged 94); Boca Raton, Florida
- Known for: Magic Dealer & Performer, Magic Demonstrator
- Awards: October 2, 1984, declared "Al Cohen Day" by City of Washington, D.C.

Al Cohen (January 11, 1926 – December 13, 2020) was the owner, and a well-known demonstrator of magic tricks, at Al's Magic Shop in Washington, D.C.

== Biography ==
In 1936 at age 10, Al Cohen began working at his father Macye Cohen's gift shop, "The Oriental Bazaar" in Washington, D.C. at 1205 Pennsylvania Avenue, which would eventually evolve into Al's Magic Shop. He became a very successful demonstrator for the store, and became widely known among magicians for his abilities at demonstrating magic tricks.

Al's Magic Shop eventually relocated on the west side of Vermont Avenue between K and L Streets, NW, had an array of famous customers over the years, who included (in addition to virtually every well-known performing magician at the time who passed through D.C.): George H. W. Bush, Gen. Norman Schwarzkopf, Henny Youngman, and Muhammad Ali, among any number of other TV and film celebrities, prominent government officials and politicians, and a variety of other well-known personalities.

As a performer, Al has played many venues, including among others: four times at the White House, on early Washington TV, and at birthday parties, magic conventions and corporate events.

Al retired from running the shop in 2002, and it was closed in 2004. He died on December 13, 2020.

== Honors ==
- The City of Washington, D.C., declared October 2, 1984, "Al Cohen Day".

== Quotes ==
"Al Cohen is not only one of the most honest and respected dealers in the world, he is above all else a gentleman. I have yet to meet a magician who doesn't hold Al Cohen in the highest regard." — Larry Becker

== Publications ==
- "Magical Mish-Mosh (and Other Tricky Trivia)", by Al Cohen, 1985.
- "John Murray's 'One Cup & Coin': Reprinted from 'Another Close-up Cavalcade' by John Murray" - 14 pages, copyright Jerry Mentzer, John Murray & Al Cohen, 1994
- "Memoirs of a Magic Dealer", by Al Cohen, GENII, Dec. 2007, p. 16.

== Sources ==
- The Linking Ring, Vol. 65, No. 2, February 1985, OUR COVER, AL COHEN, page 57.
- The Washingtonian, April 17, 1988, "Al Cohen: It Takes a Flexible Man to Sell a Rubber Chicken", by Vic Sussman, page 15.
- M-U-M, Vol. 84, No. 1, June 1994, THE AL COHEN ISSUE, "Al's Magic Shop", by Larry White, page 14.
- The Linking Ring, Vol. 82, No. 2, February 2002, "Al and Alice Cohen to Close Al's Magic", by Larry Lipman, page 41.
- Genii 2002 March|Genii, Vol. 65, No. 3, March 2002, "The End of an Era ... Al’s Magic Shop", by Jamy Ian Swiss, page 24.
- M-U-M, Vol. 103, No. 1, June 2013, "Al Cohen: The Best Pitchman in Magic", page 40.
- Washington Post, December 19, 2020, "Al Cohen, DC Magic Shop Proprietor Who Knew All the Tricks, Dies at 94." Page B1
