= John Gaughan =

American manufacturer of magic acts (born 1940)

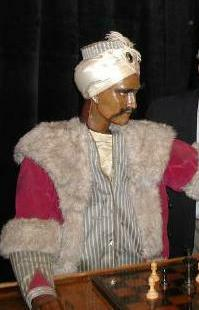
Gaughan's reconstructed Turk

John Gaughan (born 1940) is an American manufacturer of magic acts and equipment for magicians based in Los Angeles, California. His style of work is classic, not based heavily on machinery and technology.

Professional illusionists have noted his work, such as David Blaine, who has several times called him "a magical genius". Jamy Ian Swiss called him "America's premiere illusion builder". Gaughan has built illusions for magicians and other performers including Harry Blackstone Jr., Doug Henning, Alice Cooper, Michael Jackson, Alan Wakeling, Mark Wilson, Criss Angel, David Copperfield, David Blaine, Simon Drake, and The Doors, and is responsible for the construction of dozens of major acts. He also has constructed a replica of the 18th century chess-playing machine, The Turk, which often tours chess conferences.

Gaughan created David Copperfield's flying illusion, which is notable for its graceful motion and unencumbered appearance. Gaughan held a patent on a method for creating the illusion of flight. Gaughan also created a "one-of-a-kind" prop for Mark Wilson Productions for a National Fire Prevention Week Event. Using a standard golf cart chassis, John and his team created "Snuffy". Snuffy was a "magical" boiler type fire engine that seemed to drive along without any visible driver.
