= Karrell Fox =

- Born: January 30, 1928; Rainelle, West Virginia, U.S.
- Died: March 12, 1998 (aged 70); Las Vegas, Nevada, U.S.
- Resting place: Lakeside Cemetery, Colon, Michigan
- Occupation(s): Illusionist, magician
- Known for: comedy, card magic, stage magic
- Spouse: Lynn Fox
- Children: 2

Karrell Fox (January 30, 1928 – March 12, 1998) was a 20th-century American magician and television performer.

== Initial interest in magic ==
When Fox was a child, his parents operated a small restaurant in Rainelle, West Virginia. One day, a customer left without paying his bill, and left behind a few small tricks. With these, Karrell began his magic career.

== Trade shows and conventions ==
Fox was one of the first trade show magicians and billed himself as "King of Korn". He created the "Magic World of Ford" for the Ford Motor Company and toured with it for many years.

He was a regular performer at Abbott's Get Together, surpassed only by Gordon Miller, an Abbott's employee-performer. Fox traditionally MC'ed and performed on the closing (Saturday evening) show of the Get-Together and the "act" was a lampoon of the other acts and notable happenings from that year. Duke Stern and Abb Dickson were both Karrell's "Partner in Fun" for more than 25 years, performing with him at magic conventions all over the world. The scripts for the performances were written by Fox, Stern, Dickson as well as other members of the troupe. Harry Blackstone, Jr., describing Fox's writing style, said, "The strongest possible effects achieved with the simplest possible methods has always been the Fox formula."

For several years, Fox wrote the "FOX-TALES" column in TOPS magazine, which was run by the Abbott Magic & Novelty Company. During the 1993 Get-Together, Fox gave a tour of Colon's Cemetery, filled with legendary magicians that have passed. This tradition has been carried on by Al The Only of Hawaii.

Fox appeared on the Australian Magic Convention public show line-up June 8–11, 1984.

Contrary to popular belief, Karrell did not have any part of Roy Kissell’s Fox Fun ‘N Magic Shop that was located in Detroit, Michigan, although he and Kissell were dear friends.

== Television appearances ==
As a young man, Fox regularly performed magic on a local Detroit show called Junior Jamboree. He later had his own TV show on local Detroit television, performing as "Milky the Clown". Fox was offered the part after his appearances on Jamboree, but initially had to turn it down when he was drafted, recommending his friend Clare Cummings as a replacement. When he returned from the service two years later, the show was wildly successful and Fox suggested he act as Cummings' understudy despite being offered the main role. The two alternated appearances starting in 1964.

Fox also appeared on The Ed Sullivan Show in 1946, aged 18.

== Personal life ==
Fox was married to his "child bride" (as he often referred to her {c.f., “Thank You’s” in “My Latest Book, 1988}, Lynn, and had two sons, Karlin (a combination of Karrell's and Lynn's names) and Darin. {See previous citation.}

== Death ==
Fox died in 1998 while attending the Las Vegas Desert Magic Seminar, aged 70, from undisclosed causes. He was interred at Lakeside Cemetery in Colon, Michigan.

== Honors and awards ==
Between 1986 and 1987, Fox served as the 48th president of the International Brotherhood of Magicians. In 1996, a Golden Palm Star on the Palm Springs, California, Walk of Stars was dedicated to him.

He also received:

- Sphinx Award (Platform Effect) (1949)
- The Academy of Magical Arts Creative Fellowship
- The Academy of Magical Arts Lecturer of the Year (1980)
- The Academy of Magical Arts Literature & Media Fellowship (1992)
- The Academy of Magical Arts Masters Fellowship (1996)

== Contributions ==
- Bullseye Card
- B.S. Miser's Dream Pail
- Magical Assets
- Nite-Cap
- Take It and Stick It
- Two Fisted Book Test
- Mene-Tekel Book Test
- Knifty Knot
- No Not
- Baffling Blow-Outs

== Published works ==
- Kornfidentially Yours (1954)
- Comedy A La Card (1960)
- Clever Like a Fox (1976)
- Another Book by Karrell Fox (1979)
- Abra K Fox (1983)
- For My Next Trick (1986)
- My Latest Book (1988)
- Goodies (1991)
- Much Ado About Something (1995)
- Karrell Fox, The Legend (1998) (video)

== See also ==
- List of magicians
- Sleight of hand
