= Michael Skinner (magician) =

American magician (1941–1998)

Michael Skinner (1941 – 1998) was an American magician known for his close-up magic. He was born in Rochester, New York in 1941, but spent most of his professional life living and working in Las Vegas. He worked over 20 years as the magician-in-residence at the Golden Nugget hotel, but he also made appearances in other venues. He also performed twice on The Tonight Show Starring Johnny Carson.

Skinner was known for his large repertoire. He was reported to have once performed 28 consecutive shows without the repetition of a single trick during a full week of bookings at the Magic Castle.

Skinner studied under magicians Eddie Fechter and Dai Vernon.
