= Johnny Thompson =

American comedian

- Born: John Max Thompson; July 27, 1934; Chicago, Illinois, U.S.
- Died: March 9, 2019 (aged 84); Las Vegas, Nevada, U.S.
- Other name: The Great Tomsoni
- Occupations: Illusionist, comedian
- Spouse: Pamela Hayes (1936–2021)

John Max Thompson (July 27, 1934 – March 9, 2019) was an American comedian and Las Vegas illusionist who performed under the stage name The Great Tomsoni with his wife, Pamela Hayes. They had a comedic slapstick act with the well-dressed Thompson and his gum-popping assistant, Pam, performing illusions while enduring a series of mishaps. Within the magician community, Tomsoni was considered a virtuoso, widely known as a mentor and teacher of magic, and a creator of tricks, as opposed to simply a performer. He worked behind the scenes with magicians such as Penn and Teller, Lance Burton, Criss Angel, and Mat Franco. In 1999, he was awarded one of the highest honors in the magician community, a Masters Fellowship with the Academy of Magical Arts. January 30, 2020, Showtime released a documentary about Thompson written and directed by Emery Emery called Gambler's Ballad: The Legend of Johnny Thompson.

== Biography ==
Thompson, who was Polish-American, was born in Chicago on July 27, 1934. Along with his wife Pamela Hayes, he performed a slapstick comic magical act in which he played the role of a dapper but buffoonish vaudeville gentleman, with a gum-popping assistant, and they endured various mishaps during their performance. One of his trademarks was producing pure white doves on stage, which were trained to play along with the act once they had appeared.

He had been featured on many episodes of Criss Angel's Mindfreak, the "Hair" episode of Penn and Teller's Bullshit!, and the film The Aristocrats. His wife and assistant, Pamela Hayes Thompson, was featured in the film Women in Boxes about magicians' assistants.

He was the producer on the television program Penn & Teller: Fool Us. As part of that job, he was responsible for making the final call as to whether the performers were able to fool Penn & Teller.

=== Death ===
On February 25, 2019, Thompson collapsed during a rehearsal of Fool Us and was taken to Spring Valley Hospital in Las Vegas. He died in the hospital 12 days later, on March 9, at the age of 84 from complications of respiratory failure. As tearfully reported by Penn Jillette on his podcast, "Penn's Sunday School" released March 10, 2019: "Johnny Thompson, many of you know, my hero, my mentor, my friend, my co-worker...who for over 20 years had been working with Penn and Teller, guiding us on everything; Johnny Thompson who was like a grandfather to my children, Johnny died today. He was working on "Penn and Teller 'Fool Us'", right after working with an act, he collapsed next to Mike Close. His heart stopped. There was CPR. The EMTs got his heart going again. He went in and was in the hospital from that Monday until today, so 10 days. He was conscious for a few moments...I spoke to him, but he couldn't answer back because he had a ventilator in his mouth, but he was clearly there. And he died. ...So I'm doing the show tonight...because Johnny would not have allowed me not to go on. ...The last words I said to him were "I love you," the last words he said to me were "I love you," ...I love you, Johnny."

== Names ==
Thompson's act has performed under the following names:

- The Great Tomsoni
- The Great Tomsoni & Co.
- The Great Tomsoni and Company
- The Great Tomsoni: The Wizard of Warsaw
- Tomsoni & Co.
- Tomsoni & Company

== Awards ==
- Magicians of the Year: Johnny and Pam Thompson
- Allan Slaight Award Lifetime Achievement 2015 - JOHNNY THOMPSON
- Clarke Senator Crandall Award For Comedy, Abbott's Magic Get Together, 1992
- LOUIE award, Tannen's Magic Jubilee, 2000
- Masters Fellowship, Academy of Magical Arts, 1999
