= Richard J. Kaufman =

American writer (born 1958)

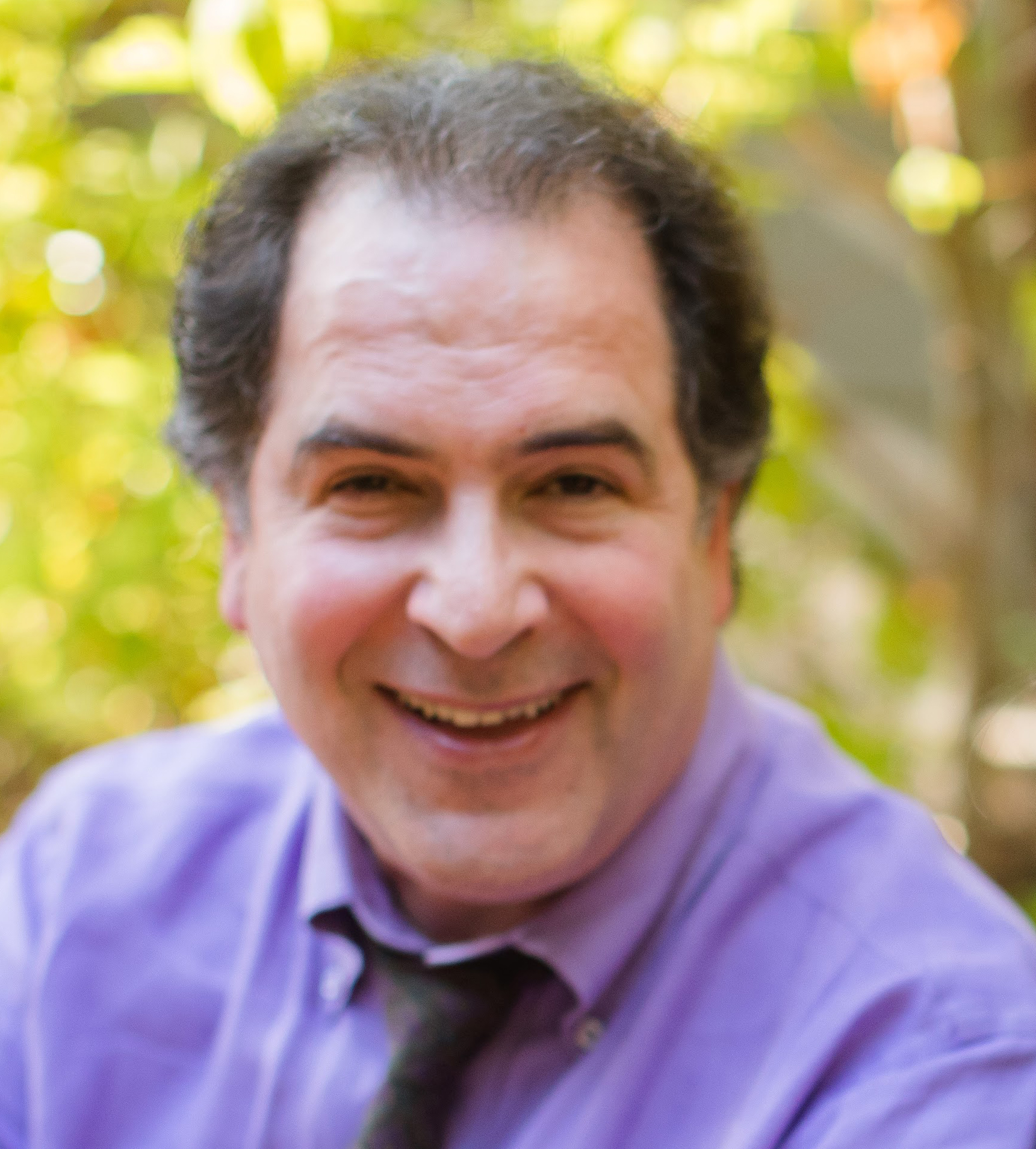
- Kaufman in 2017
- Born: May 16, 1958 (age 68); New York City, United States
- Education: Queens College New York University
- Occupations: Writer, illustrator, publisher, magician
- Writing career
- Genre: Magic
- Website: richardkaufman.com

Richard J. Kaufman (born May 16, 1958) is an author, publisher, illustrator, and editor of books and magazines in the field of magic and amateur magicians of noted skill.

== Early life and education ==
Richard Kaufman was born in 1958 at French Hospital in New York City. He became interested in magic at age 5 after his uncle, Alan Soffin, sent him some novelties from the S.S. Adams Company. His father, Lewis C. Kaufman, encouraged his interest by purchasing tricks at a magic shop, learning them, and teaching them to his son.

By the age of 14, Kaufman was inventing magic effects He marketed his first two tricks through Lou Tannen's Magic Shop at age 15 and he illustrated his first book for Harry Lorayne, Afterthoughts (1975) at age 16. He attended Queens College, and then New York University, graduating in 1981 with a double major in English and acting, having studied at the Stella Adler Studio in New York City with Pearl Pearson and Mario Siletti.

== Career ==
Kaufman illustrated many books in the field through 1994, popularizing a style of cartoon-based movement into technical magic illustration. He also began writing magic books, starting with the Interlocked Production of Coins in 1977. He self-published his first two books, then sought a partner for the financing required to publish larger books. Alan C. Greenberg, CEO of Bear Stearns, also a highly respected amateur magician, brought the financing that Kaufman required and the company Kaufman and Greenberg was formed as a result.

In 1998, Genii, The Conjurors' Magazine was purchased by Kaufman, his wife Elizabeth, and partners Jane and Daniel Solomon. Kaufman became editor in chief and president of The Genii Corporation and the magazine continues its publication, now in both printed and digital formats. Genii also operates The Genii Forum an internet discussion group and MagicPedia, an online encyclopedia of magic. The magazine and its associated entities was sold to Randy Pitchford, CEO of Gearbox Software in July 2017. Richard and Elizabeth Kaufman continue as Editor and Art Director.

For the public, Kaufman wrote The Project Magic Handbook (2002) for David Copperfield; the trick section in Mindfreaks(2007) for Criss Angel and Knack Magic Tricks for Globe Pequot Press (2010).

Recognition of Kaufman's influence as a magic illustrator is described in Chuck Romano's book, The Art of Deception (1997) ISBN 0-578-00752-5.

Kaufman has appeared on the covers of Genii, The Conjurors' Magazine (1987); Magic Magazine (1993); The Magic Circular (2006); M-U-M (2011) and has given presentations at numerous magic conferences including the Los Angeles Conference on Magic History, The Magic Collectors Association, The Magic Circle Collectors Day, and Magic-Con 2011. He has received the 1997 Literary Fellowship from the Academy of Magical Arts (the Magic Castle), the J.N. Maskelyne Award from the Magic Circle in London in 2001, the Milbourne Christopher Award in 1995, The Allan Slaight Award for “Sharing Secrets” in both 2016 and 2019 (the only person to have received the award twice), and the Special History, Research & Scholarship Award from FISM in 2022. He has also been made an honorary life member of the Society of American Magicians and The Academy of Magical Arts at The Magic Castle, a Member of the Inner Magic Circle with Gold Star at London's Magic Circle, and has received a president's citation from the International Brotherhood of Magicians. Kaufman wrote for the Pop Culture website Boing Boing through 2018.

== Publications ==
=== Periodicals ===
Edited by Richard Kaufman:

- 1978 Apocalypse with Harry Lorayne
- 1982 Richard's Almanac
- 1995 The Looking Glass
- 1999 Genii

=== Books ===
Written, illustrated, and/or published by Richard Kaufman:

- 1973 Genesis Kings written by Fr. Brennan (marketed trick)
- 1973 Rollover Aces written by Fr. Brennan (marketed trick)
- 1975 Afterthoughts by Harry Lorayne (Illustrated by Kaufman)
- 1977 The Interlocked Production of Coins (illustrated, and published by Kaufman)
- 1977 Balls! Lessons in Side Arm Snookery (Written, illustrated, and published by Kaufman)
- 1977 The Magic Book by Harry Lorayne (Illustrated by Kaufman)
- 1978 On the Up and Up (Written, illustrated, and published by Kaufman)
- 1978 The Real Secrets of The Three Ball Routines by Frank Garcia (Illustrated by Kaufman)
- 1978 The Card Classics of Ken Krenzel By Harry Lorayne (Illustrated by Kaufman)
- 1978 Apocalypse, Vol. 1 (Created by Kaufman and edited in conjunction with Harry Lorayne)
- 1979 CardMagic by Richard Kaufman (Written and illustrated and published by Kaufman)
- 1979 New Stars of Magic presents The Ultimate Invisible Assembly (trick created and contributed by Kaufman)
- 1980 The Gene Maze Card Book (Written and illustrated and published by Kaufman)
- 1980 The Very Best of Cups and Balls by Frank Garcia (Illustrated by Kaufman)
- 1980 Exclusive Card Miracles By Frank Garcia (Illustrated by Kaufman)
- 1981 CoinMagic (Written, illustrated, and published by Kaufman)
- 1981 CardWorks (Written and illustrated and published by Kaufman)
- 1982 Tom Mullica's AEROBIC: Automatic-Entry Roll-Over Bill-In-Cigarette (Written and illustrated by Kaufman)
- 1982 The Complete Works of Derek Dingle (Written and illustrated and published by Kaufman)
- 1982 The New York Magic Symposium – Collection 1 (Written and illustrated by Kaufman)
- 1982 The Elegant Card Magic of Fr. Cyprian by Frank Garcia (Illustrated by Kaufman)
- 1983 The New York Magic Symposium – Collection 2 (Written and illustrated by Kaufman)
- 1983 Richard's Almanac Volume 1 (Hardcover Reprint of Volume One) (Written and illustrated and published by Kaufman)
- 1984 Abstract (Lecture Notes) (Written and illustrated and published by Kaufman)
- 1984 The Topit Book by Michael Ammar (Illustrated by Kaufman)
- 1985 David Roth's Expert Coin Magic (Written and illustrated and published by Kaufman)
- 1985 Don England's Gaffed To The Hilt! By Jon Racherbaumer (Illustrated and published by Kaufman)
- 1986 Sankey Panky (Written and illustrated and published by Kaufman)
- 1986 The Compleat Invocation, Vols. 1 & 2 (by Tony Raven and Tony Andruzzi, Published by Kaufman)
- 1986 Spirit Theater By Eugene Burger (Published by Kaufman)
- 1987 The Uncanny Scot: Ron Wilson (Written and illustrated by Richard Kaufman)
- 1987 The Performance of Close-Up Magic By Eugene Burger, (illustrated and published by Kaufman)
- 1987 Lim-Tricks By Jeff Sheridan (Published by Kaufman)
- 1987 Derek Dingle's Australian Poker (written, illustrated, and published by Kaufman)
- 1987 The New Jinx (Book) By Bill Madsen (Published by Kaufman)
- 1988 Darwin Ortiz at the Card Table by Darwin Ortiz, (illustrated and published by Kaufman)
- 1988 New Magic of Japan by Phil Goldstein and Richard Kaufman (Published by Kaufman)
- 1988 Sawa's Library of Magic, Vol. 1 (written, illustrated, photographed, and published by Kaufman)
- 1989 Williamson's Wonders (written, illustrated, and published by Kaufman)
- 1989 The Secrets of Brother John Hamman (written, illustrated, and published by Kaufman)
- 1989 The Experience of Magic by Eugene Burger, illustrated by Kaufman
- 1989 On The Pass (Video starring Kaufman)
- 1990 100% Sankey (written, illustrated, and published by Kaufman)
- 1990 Gary Kurtz: Unexplainable Acts (written, illustrated, and published by Kaufman)
- 1990 The Amazing Miracles Of Shigeo Takagi (Written and published by Kaufman)
- 1991 Life Savers By Michael Weber (published by Kaufman)
- 1991 Strange Ceremonies By Eugene Burger (published by Kaufman)
- 1991 Card Craft By J.K. Hartman, illustrated by Joseph K. Schmidt (published by Kaufman)
- 1991 Road Hustler By Robert Prus (published by Kaufman)
- 1991 Houdini's Conjurer’s Monthly Magazine (published by Kaufman))
- 1991 Smoke and Mirrors By John Bannon (illustrated and Published by Kaufman)
- 1992 Five Times Five: Japan (written and published by Kaufman)
- 1992 The Collected Almanac (Written, illustrated, and published by Kaufman)
- 1992 The Compleat Invocation, Vol. 3 by Tony Andruzzi (published by Kaufman)
- 1992 Totally Out of Control By Chris Kenner (published by Kaufman)
- 1992 Tom Mullica Starring in Show-Time at the Tom-Foolery (written, photographed, and published by Kaufman)
- 1993 Beyond Compere By Terry Seabrooke (published by Kaufman)
- 1993 Martin Gardner Presents By Martin Gardner (Published by Kaufman)
- 1993 Secrets Draun From Underground (Written and published by Kaufman)
- 1993 Tarbell 8 (Harlan Tarbell, Steve Burton, Richard Kaufman)
- 1993 A Tarbell Scrapbook (compiled and published by Kaufman)
- 1993 Ibidem, Vol 1 Issues 1–16 (Published by Kaufman)
- 1993 The Second Now You See It, Now You Don't! by Bill Tarr and Barry Ross (reprint published by Kaufman)
- 1993 Walt Disney's The Sorcerer's Apprentice Magic and Story Bookby Bob Friedhoffer (magic section illustrated by Kaufman)
- 1994 Greater Magic by John Northern Hilliard (expanded and published by Kaufman)
- 1994 Gene Maze and The Art of Bottom Dealing By Stephen Hobbs, (published by Kaufman)
- 1994 Paul Gertner's Steel and Silver (written and published by Kaufman)
- 1994 Great Balloons! By Jean Merlin,(published by Kaufman)
- 1994 Strong Magic By Darwin Ortiz (published by Kaufman)
- 1994 Mahatma (published by Kaufman)
- 1995 Much Ado About Something By Karrell Fox (published by Kaufman)
- 1995 Duffie's Card Compulsions By Peter Duffie (published by Kaufman)
- 1995 Cardshark By Darwin Ortiz (published by Kaufman)
- 1995 After Craft: More Card Trickery By J.K. Hartman (published by Kaufman)
- 1995 The Discoverie of Witchcraft by Reginald Scot (published by Kaufman)
- 1995 The Magic of Edward Victor’s Hands By Rae Hammond (published by Kaufman)
- 1995 Magic of the Hands Trilogy By Edward Victor (published by Kaufman)
- 1995 Facsimile 1 by Jon Racherbaumer (published by Kaufman)
- 1995 New Card Control Systems by Joseph K. Schmidt (published by Kaufman)
- 1996 Tom Mullica Lecture Notes (written by Kaufman and Tom Mullica)
- 1996 Magie Duvivier By Jon Racherbaumer, (Published by Kaufman)
- 1996 Lou Gallo: The Underground Man by Richard Kaufman and Mark Phillips (published by Kaufman)
- 1996 A Magician Among the Spirits (Published by Kaufman)
- 1996 Séance By Scott Davis (Published by Kaufman)
- 1996 Facsimile 2 by Jon Racherbaumer (Published by Kaufman)
- 1996 Notes to Houdini!!! By Ken Silverman (Published by Kaufman)
- 1996 Stanyon’s Magic (Published by Kaufman)
- 1996 Stanyon's Serial Lessons in Conjuring (Published by Kaufman)
- 1997 Jennings '67 (written and published by Kaufman)
- 1997 Arcade Dreams: Ed Marlo By Jon Racherbaumer (published by Kaufman)
- 1997 The Feints and Temps of Harry Riser By Ed Brown (published by Kaufman)
- 1997 Folding Money Fooling By Robert Neale (published by Kaufman
- 1997 Greater Artful Dodges of Eddie Fields By Jon Racherbaumer (Published by Kaufman))
- 1997 Effortless Card Magic By Peter Duffie, (published by Kaufman)
- 1997 Facsimile 3 by Jon Racherbaumer (published by Kaufman)
- 1997 Charles Bertram: The Court Conjurer By Edwin Dawes (published by Kaufman)
- 1997 Looking Glass (4 Issues edited by Kaufman, Racherbaumer, and Hobbs)
- 1997 Basic Basic Basic Card Technique (Video starring Kaufman)
- 1998 The Book or Don't Forget to Point by the Flicking Fingers (published by Kaufman)
- 1998 Vis a Vis: A Jack Avis Book By Jack Avis and John Derris, illustrated by Joseph K. Schmidt
- 1998 The Mysteries of My Life: Rene Lavand By Richard Kaufman and Rene Lavand (Published by Kaufman)
- 1998 Street Magic by Jeff Sheridan and Edward Claflin (published by Kaufman)
- 1998 Five Times Five: Scotland By Peter Duffie (published by Kaufman)
- 1998 The Now You See It, Now You Don't! Notebook Written and Illustrated by Bill Tarr (published by Kaufman)
- 1998 Stodare: The Enigma Variations By Dr. Edwin Dawes (published by Kaufman)
- 1999 Trickery Treats by J.K. Hartman, illustrated by Joseph K. Schmidt(published by Kaufman)
- 1999 Artistic and Magical Life of Bob Kline By Bill King (published by Kaufman)
- 2000 Mastering the Art of Magic By Eugene Burger, (published by Kaufman)
- 2000 Facsimile 4 by Jon Racherbaumer (published by Kaufman)
- 2000 Other Voices: Ventriloquism from BC to TV By Stanley Burns (published by Kaufman)
- 2001 The Lost Notebooks of John Northern Hilliard (Published by The Genii Corporation)
- 2002 Sexy Magic written and illustrated by James Hodges; translated from the French by Jane Solomon (published by Kaufman)
- 2002 Stanley Collins, Conjuror, Collector and Iconoclast By Dr. Edwin Dawes (published by Kaufman)
- 2003 David Copperfield's Project Magic Handbook by Richard Kaufman
- 2005 Seriously Silly By David Kaye (published by Kaufman)
- 2005 One Hundred by Warlock By Elizabeth Warlock illustrated by Joseph K. Schmidt (Published by The Genii Corporation)
- 2006 The Vernon Touch By Dai Vernon (Published by The Genii Corporation)
- 2007 Mindfreak by Criss Angel and Richard Kaufman (Trick Section) ISBN 0-06-113761-8
- 2010 Knack Magic Tricks: A Step-by-Step Guide to Illusions, Sleight of Hand, and Amazing Feats (Photographs by Elizabeth Kaufman and foreword by David Copperfield) ISBN 1-59921-779-1
- 2011 The Berglas Effects by Richard Kaufman and David Berglas(published by Kaufman)
- 2013 Japan Ingenious by Richard Kaufman and Steve Cohen (published by Kaufman)
- 2014 The Skinner Tapes (13 disc set of audio CDs and DVDs) (published by Kaufman)
- 2015 Labyrinth by Stephen Hobbs (published by Kaufman)
- 2015 Tenyoism (Written, photographed, and published by Richard Kaufman)
- 2016 The Secrets of So Sato by So Sato and Richard Kaufman (published by Kaufman)
- 2016 Super Sized Silly (David Kaye) (published by Kaufman)
- 2017 Spoiler Alert (Ryan Matney) (published by Kaufman)
- 2018 Totally Out of Control: SUPREME MME EDITION by Chris Kenner (published by Kaufman)
- 2018 DeLand: Madness and Mystery (Written and published by Kaufman)
- 2021 Mr. Jennings Takes it Easy (Written and published by Kaufman)

Future books that Kaufman has announced:

- Greater Magic (New Edition)
- Mr. Jennings Takes It Tough
- Cliff Green's Professional Card Magic

== Awards ==
- The Milbourne Christopher Literary Award (1995)
- The Academy of Magical Arts Literary & Media Fellowship (1997)
- The John Nevil Maskelyne Prize (2001) awarded by The Magic Circle
- The Allan Slaight Award for “Sharing Secrets” (2016)
- The Allan Slaight Award for “Sharing Secrets” (2019)
- The History, Research & Scholarship Award from FISM (2022).
