= Magic (American magazine) =

Defunct magazine for magicians

MAGIC
- Cover of August 2016 issue
- Frequency: Monthly
- Founder: Stan Allen
- First issue: September 1991
- Final issue Number: November 2016; 301
- Country: United States
- Based in: Las Vegas
- Language: English
- Website: www.magicmagazine.com
- ISSN: 1062-2845

MAGIC, also known as The Magazine for Magicians, was an independent magazine for magicians that was based in Las Vegas, Nevada. A creation of Stan Allen, it debuted in September 1991, with its first issue featuring Lance Burton on the cover. Over the years, David Copperfield, Siegfried & Roy, Penn & Teller, Mike Caveney, and Mac King were also featured on the cover. Its final issue was #301 in November 2016.

== Overview ==
MAGIC started out as an eight-page monthly newsletter. Early editions of the magazine had around 48 pages before increasing to more than 130 pages. In 1996, there were 8,500 subscribers; at its peak, MAGIC had 10,000 subscribers. Writers for the magazine have included Jim Steinmeyer, Joshua Jay, Shawn McMaster, Alan Howard, Max Maven, Richard J. Kaufman, Mike Caveney, Robert Farmer, Jon Racherbaumer, Gabe Fajuri, John Lovick, Peter Duffie, Andi Gladwin, Mark Nelson, Rory Johnston, and Timothy Hyde. A digital version of MAGIC became available in 2011.

In 2005, MAGIC was awarded a Guinness World Record for being the world's largest-selling publication for magicians. In 2007, it was listed as one of the Chicago Tribune's 50 favorite magazines in their annual summer list.

== MAGIC Live! ==
In 2001, it was announced that MAGIC would be producing an event called MAGIC Live! The purpose of the event was to bring to life the stories and features of the print magazine. The "unconventional convention", as it was deemed, took place August 19–22, 2001 at the Orleans Hotel & Casino in Las Vegas, Nevada. Due to its popularity, the second edition took place in August 2004, again at the Orleans.

Originally meant to be a one-time event, MAGIC Live! is typically held every other August, usually at the Orleans. In 2009, the convention took place at the nearby South Point Hotel & Casino. The 2021 event was cancelled due to the COVID-19 pandemic and rescheduled for the following May. MAGIC Live! has been held annually since then, with its 2024 edition scheduled for August 4–7.

Notable events included Guy Hollingworth's one-man-play "Expert at The Card Table" in 2009 and the final performance of The Great Tomsoni in 2013.
