= Close-up magic =

Magic performed in an intimate setting

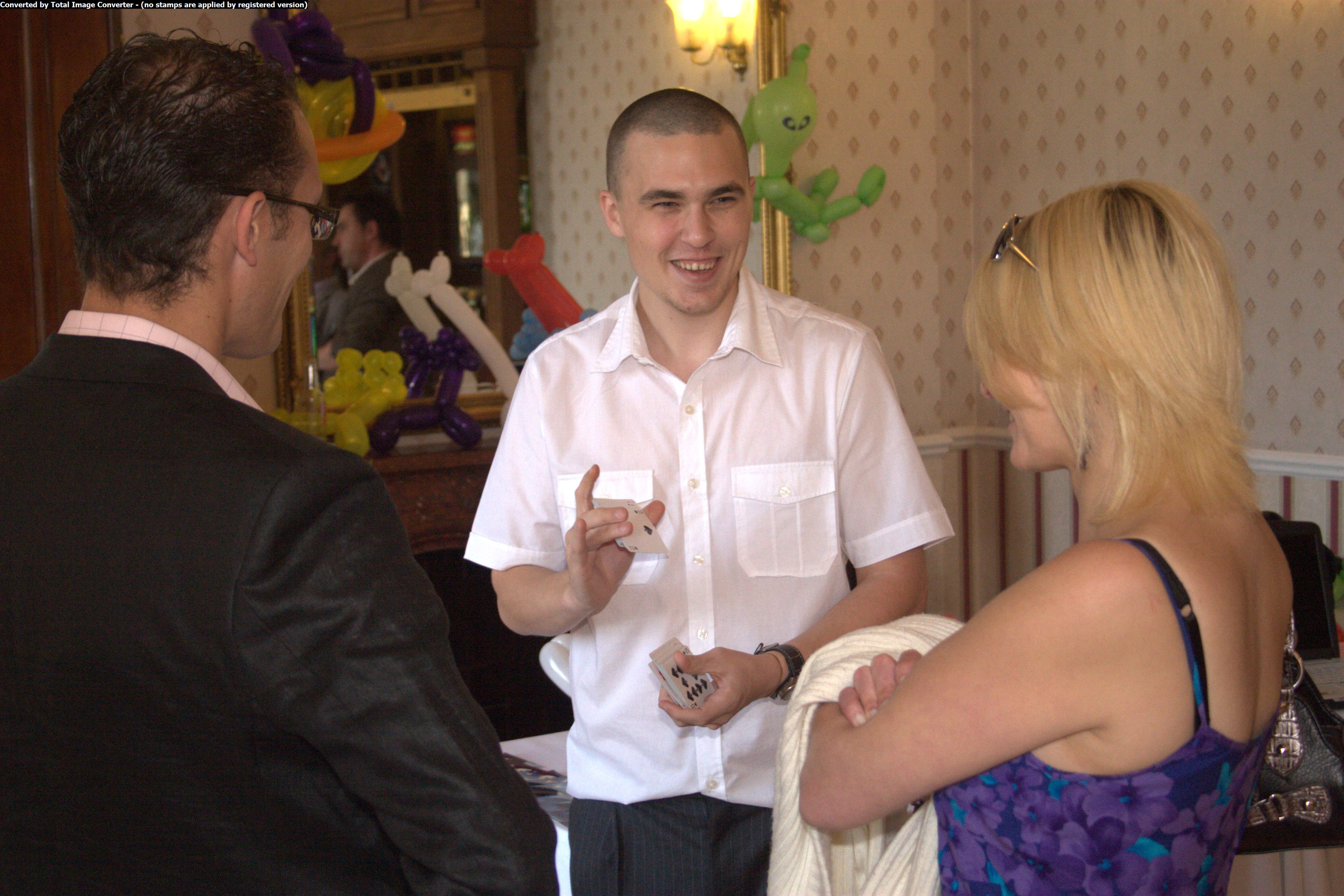
A magician performing close-up magic

Close-up magic (also known as table magic or micromagic) is magic performed in an intimate setting usually no more than 3 meters (10 feet) from one's audience and is usually performed while sitting at a table.

Sleight-of-hand, also known as prestidigitation ("quick fingers") or léger de main (Fr., "lightness of hand"), is the set of techniques used by a magician to secretly manipulate objects. Coins and playing cards are the most commonly used objects, but any small item can be used such as dice, bottle caps, sugar cubes, sponge balls, pebbles, pens, and cups and balls. A magician may use more than one kind of object in a single trick.

Close-up magicians may also enhance their performance by combining magic with other elements, such as cardistry. While magic uses misdirection to produce an illusion, these flourishes are more straightforward displays of skill, comparable to juggling.

== Famous performers ==
- Jewel Aich
- Jay Alexander
- Michael Ammar
- Tony Andruzzi
- Keith Barry
- Steve Beam
- Herbert L. Becker
- Ariann Black
- David Blaine
- J.B. Bobo
- Derren Brown
- Matthias Buchinger
- Charles Cameron
- Canuplin
- John Carney
- John Cassidy
- Milbourne Christopher
- Ali Cook
- Paul Curry
- Steve Dacri
- Paul Daniels
- Daryl
- Lewis Davenport
- Dedi
- Persi Diaconis
- Dean Dill
- Derek Dingle
- Simon Drake
- Geoffrey Durham
- Tim Ellis
- Alex Elmsley
- S. W. Erdnase
- Fakir of Ava (Isaiah Harris Hughes)
- Martin Gardner
- Paul Gertner
- Walter B. Gibson
- Andi Gladwin
- Horace Goldin
- Lennart Green
- Brother John Hamman
- Paul Harris
- Ryan Hayashi
- Whit Haydn
- Johann Nepomuk Hofzinser
- Burling Hull
- Scott Interrante
- Joshua Jay
- Ricky Jay
- Larry Jennings
- Barry Jones
- Richard Jones
- Charles Jordan
- Fred Kaps (Abraham Pieter Adrianus Bongers)
- Gustavus Katterfelto
- Igor Kio (Igor Emilievich Renard Kio)
- Kostya Kimlat
- Al Koran (Edward Doe)
- Duane Laflin
- René Lavand
- Tom London
- Harry Lorayne
- Simon Lovell
- Stuart Macleod
- Gérard Majax (Gérard Fater)
- Max Malini (Max Katz Breit)
- Leon Mandrake
- Matt Marcy
- Ed Marlo
- Doug McKenzie
- Lisa Menna
- Drummond Money-Coutts
- Stephen Mulhern
- Oscar Munoz
- David Nixon
- Lance Norris
- Alain Nu
- Shoot Ogawa
- Okito (Tobias Bamberg)
- Darwin Ortiz
- Johnny Ace Palmer
- Scott Penrose
- Jacob Philadelphia (Jacob Meyer)
- Franz Polgar
- Fay Presto
- Dominic Reyes
- Étienne-Gaspard Robert
- Brian Role
- David Roth
- Jerry Sadowitz
- Jay Sankey
- Ian Saville
- John Scarne (Orlando Carmelo Scarnecchia)
- Howie Schwarzman
- Alan Shaxon (Alan Arthur Howson)
- Michael Skinner
- Tony Slydini
- Thomas Solomon
- David Stone
- Tom Stone
- Sylvester the Jester
- Cyril Takayama
- Juan Tamariz
- Harlan Tarbell
- Teller
- Neil Tobin
- Richard Turner
- Dai Vernon
- Michael Vincent
- Val Walker
- Roy Walton
- Orson Welles
- Gregory Wilson
- Tommy Wonder
- Herb Zarrow
- Paul Zenon

== Micro magic tricks ==
- The Best Coin Fold
- Cups and balls
- Ambitious card
- Card warp
- Floating match on card
- French drop
- Palming
- Retention of vision vanish
- Hummer card
- The Four Burglars
- Scotch and soda
- Detachable thumb
- Thumb tip
- Glorpy
- Healed and sealed
- Zarrow shuffle
- Card manipulation
