= Glossary of magic (illusion) =

This is a glossary of conjuring terms used by magicians.

== A ==
- Ambitious Card Routine – A common trick where a card seemingly rises to the top of the deck. Also called ACR.
- Angles – the lines of vision of people sitting at certain position in the audience which enable a secret to be spotted* usually extreme left or right or behind. If a trick is "angly" it can only be done with limited audience viewpoints.

== B ==
- Back Palm – to palm in the back of the hand.
- Bevel – to slide the top portion of a deck of cards back so that the back of the deck is at an angle, used in some card tricks.
- Bicycle Deck – Bicycle Playing Cards.
- Black art – the use of a stage fitted with a black velvet curtain background, using assistants and other props that are hidden by black shrouds. Careful lighting helps keep the secret a mystery to the audience.
- Blind Shuffle/Blind Cut – A cut or apparent shuffle in which the cards appear mixed but all of the cards are left completely undisturbed after the shuffle or cut.
- Burn – a subject staring at the magician's hands without averting the gaze, no matter what misdirection is thrown at a subject.
- Bentz Production- A trick made famous by Noah the Illusionist. This term is used to refer to the production of items from an empty bag.

== C ==
- C/S – see Copper and Silver.
- Cardician – a magician who only performs card magic (term coined by Ed Marlo).
- Cardini Single Production – a technique, invented by Cardini, that is used in card manipulation.
- Centre tear – a special way of tearing up paper billets used in mentalism.
- Change – changing one card (or object) for another.
- Charlier Cut – One handed flourish cut or pass.
- Classic force – a force performed by fanning the cards and timing the force card to land under their fingers.
- Classic palm – to palm with the centre of the hand.
- Classic pass - A way to invisibly cut a deck of cards to either get a card to a chosen position or to undo a cut.
- Clean – a hand which is empty or the condition achieved at the end of an effect where the magician has no supposedly vanished objects or gimmicked items in her hands. See Dirty.
- Cold – A deck secretly switched in during play. "Cold" because it has not been warmed up by handling.
- Colour Change – Switching of objects, typically cards (e.g. Changing one card into another right in front of the spectator's eyes, as opposed to switching two cards secretly).
- Confederate – an audience member planted to act in a cooperative manner.
- Convincer – a delicate gesture done in order to emphasize a wrong conception, and strengthen the audience's belief in it. For instance, a common convincer in the Chinese linking rings routine is seemingly rotating a ring to prove it has no holes in it, while actually constantly hiding the hole.
- Cooler – a card deck brought into play, normally at the end of a sleight of hand routine. The term is implying that you are swapping out a 'hot' deck (where the order of cards has been lost due to the act) with a pre-arranged (cooler) deck for your finale.
- Copper and Silver (also C/S) – Effect using two coins of contrasting metals which change place.
- Crimp – A bend secretly put in a playing card which can be used in magic, there are many different types* used for card location.
- Cut and Restored – see Torn and Restored.

== D ==
- Deal – to take cards off the top of the deck. Dealing "seconds", "middles", or "bottoms" refers to a sleight in which the second, middle, or bottom card is secretly dealt in lieu of the top card.
- Dirty – a hand which contains an object the audience should not know about, or the condition at some point where the magician has "vanished" objects or gimmicked items hidden in her hands. See Clean.
- Ditch – to secretly get rid of an object or gimmick.
- Double back – a playing card with the back of a deck printed on both sides (i.e., neither side has a value printed on it).
- Double lift – A sleight in which two cards are lifted over as one. Called a Double turnover when the two cards are turned face up.
- Dove pan – a classic effect in which a performer produces a dove from a seemingly empty pan.
- Dovetail shuffle – see Riffle shuffle.
- Downs Palm – to palm between the crotch of the index finger and the crotch of the thumb. Invented by T. Nelson Downs.

== E ==
- Effect – how a magic trick is perceived by a spectator.
- Egg bag – a utility bag which can be turned inside out to conceal an object (egg) or and then reproduce it.
- Elmsley count – a false count (often done with four cards) where the face or back of a card is hidden while the cards are passed from one hand to another. Named after Alex Elmsley, who invented it.
- Equivoque – a method of forcing a specific object on a spectator through a seemingly randomized selection process. See Force.

== F ==
- Fairy dust – invisible substance stored in magician's pocket that supposedly makes tricks work. Excuse for going to a pocket to get rid of a vanished item. – also known as Magic dust.
- False shuffle/False cut – a shuffle or cut in which the deck is apparently mixed but, in reality, the portions of the original order is retained such as a top or bottom stock kept in order – also see Blind Shuffle.
- False transfer – a technique in which an object appears to be taken into one hand while actually being retained in the other.
- Faro – a shuffle similar to the riffle where the cards mesh perfectly. An in or out faro is performed depending on the position of the top card.
- Finger clip – a technique used to clip coins or small objects secretly. Usually used for production.
- Finger palm – to palm in the fingers.
- Flash – to accidentally expose an object or part of an object momentarily during a secret move.
- Flash paper – a magic gimmick that allows the magician to create effect in a routine. Often used as misdirection. see Nitrocellulose.
- Flourish – a showy move which displays handling skills.
- Force – where a card or other object is made to be selected by the spectator, despite the appearance of a free choice.
- French drop – A false transfer with a coin or small object.

== G ==
- Gaff – A gimmick designed to look like something real while accomplishing some secret task.
- Ghost count – A false count of cards.
- Glimpse – a secret view of a card or object.
- Gimmick – a secret part or object used to make the trick work.

== I ==
- Invisible deck – a gimmicked deck of cards where a named card appears reversed in a deck.
- Impromptu – a trick that can be performed at a moment's notice, usually with everyday objects and little or no preparation.

== K ==
- Key card – a known card used to locate another. See locator.

== L ==
- Lapping – dropping an object into one's lap to vanish it* performed while seated.
- Load – Verb—to secretly put an object into a location. Noun—An object in a secret location ready to be produced.
- Loaded – a die which comes up the same number, or an object which secretly contains another object ready for production.
- Locator – similar to a key card* a card which can be found in some way. It may be long, short, thick, rough, smooth, crimped, daubed, marked, reversed, or simply known.
- Loop – A super-thin elastic string, tied into a small circular loop, worn on the wrist. Used for levitating small, lightweight objects and many PK effects.

== M ==
- M5 – Neodymium magnet, used for PK effects, balances, stopping watches, and vanishes.
- Magic dust – invisible substance stored in magician's pocket that supposedly makes tricks work. Excuse for going to a pocket to get rid of a vanished item. Also called "Woofle Dust." See Misdirection.
- Magician's choice – see Force.
- Magician's rope – soft, usually white rope used for rope tricks.
- Magician's wax – wax used to temporarily attach objects. The earliest known magician's wax is beeswax.
- Manipulator – a magician with a showy sleight of hand act, often set to music.
- Mark – a subject for a con game.
- Marked deck – a deck of cards with secret markings on the back of each card to identify that card's value.
- Mechanic – an operator who is very skilled at sleight of hand, usually with cards.
- Mechanic's grip – a way of holding the pack in the left hand ready for dealing. The forefinger is on the front of the deck to help square the pack and control the cards. A lay person will hold the deck with the fingers all underneath or down the side.
- Mercury Fold – a card move in which the magician secretly folds a card under the deck.
- Misdirection – psychological techniques for controlling attention.
- Monte – a famous con game where three cards are thrown down and the mark has to follow a chosen card* due to a sleight of hand, the mark never wins.
- Muscle Pass – A coin pass that involves gripping the coin with the base of the thumb and squeezing it out of the hand

== O ==
- Oil and Water – a type of card effect in which shuffled red and black cards are revealed to be separated.
- One Ahead – principle often used in mentalism where the magician uses previously obtained information to stay one step ahead of the audience and supposedly make accurate predictions/guesses.
- One-Handed Cut – a card flourish in which the magician cuts the deck using only one hand.
- Out – an alternative ending to an effect.
- Overhand shuffle – a shuffle where the cards are dropped from one hand into the other in small random groups.

== P ==
- Packet trick – a card magic effect involving a small quantity of cards.
- Palm – to secretly hold an object in the hand in a manner which is unnoticeable.
- Pass – a secret move to transpose the halves of a pack* a way to secretly cut a deck of cards.
- Patter – The dialogue used in the performance of an effect. Patter styles may differ from magician to magician – some prefer a serious patter, while others opt for a light hearted humorous patter to relax the audience and try to catch them off guard.
- Peek – see Glimpse.
- Prestidigitation – Magic tricks performed as entertainment.
- Profonde/Pochettes – large pockets in tail coats which can be used for vanishes or productions, although not a popular method today due to fashion trends.
- Pinch – holding something between the fingers.
- Plant – see Confederate.
- PK Effect – see "Psychokinesis".
- Psychokinesis – moving things using supposed supernatural powers.
- Pull – a device of elastic which pulls object up sleeve or under jacket as in the vanishing cigarette.
- Pull through shuffle – the concluding move to a riffle where the two halves are pulled through each other and not mixed.

== R ==
- Raven – a pull consisting of a padded magnet on elastic.
- Retention of vision – the after-image on the retina* applied to certain visually convincing vanishes.
- Riffle – to let cards come out of the hand, creating a noise.
- Riffle shuffle – the most common shuffling technique in which half of the deck is held in each hand with the thumbs inward, then cards are released by the thumbs so that they fall to the table intertwined.
- Rough – cards which have been treated with substance to increase surface friction, making it easier to keep cards aligned to each other.
- Routine – a sequence of effects (typically related).
- Run – taking the cards off singly during an overhand shuffle which can be used to stack the deck.

== S ==
- Secret – core principle of conjuring; something which should not be shared, usually a method, sleight, or other means of accomplishing an effect.
- Self-working – describes a trick (such as a card trick) that requires minimal skill and no sleight of hand.
- Servante – a secret shelf or compartment behind the magician's table.
- Silk – a silk handkerchief.
- Shell – a hollowed out coin or ball which fits over the real object allowing vanish and reproductions.
- Shell game – a confidence trick involving three half walnut shells and a pea. The mark bets on which shell contains the pea but loses every time because the operator is cheating with sleight of hand.
- Shill – an audience member planted to act in a cooperative manner. Also known as a Confederate.
- Shut Eye – a performer so skilled at the illusion of mind reading that they come to believe they actually do possess psychic powers.
- Shuffle – to randomize a deck of playing cards.
- Siva Count – also known as the reversed elmsley count, is a false count done usually after executing an Elmsley count.
- Sleeving – dropping an object up a sleeve to vanish it.
- Sleeve Toss – a technique used in dove magic.
- Sleight – a secret move or technique.
- Slicks – highly polished cards or coins which are more slippery* useful for flourishes. See Rough.
- Slide – a tube used to get an object to an otherwise impossible to reach location.
- Slip – to retain the top or bottom cards, or both, during an overhand shuffle.
- Slip-on corner – a corner of a card that can be placed over the actual corner of a card. These corners show a rank and suit different from the card's actual.
- Sphinx Principle – the concept that two mirrors at 90 degrees and with their apex facing the audience can be used to reflect the side curtains or walls, which are the same pattern as those at the back, enabling an object to be hidden behind the mirrors* first used in the Sphinx illusion.
- Sponge – a sponge ball.
- Spread – flourishing a deck of cards onto a tabletop.
- Stack – (noun) a prearranged deck or part of the deck of cards.
- Stack – (verb) to arrange cards to the performer's need while shuffling them.
- Steal – a sleight used to obtain an object secretly.
- Stodare egg – a hollow egg used in vanish or production of a silk.
- Stooge – see Confederate.
- Subtlety – A variation on, or way of performance of, a trick that makes it more believable.
- Sucker effect – a trick where the spectator is led to believe they have worked it out, only to be proven wrong.
- Switch – to exchange one object for another.
- Svengali deck – also called a long-and-short deck, a gaff deck of cards in which half of the cards are shorter than the other half. The shorter cards all have the same value (e.g., 8 of diamonds), while the long cards are all different. Svengali decks can be used for card forces, ambitious card routines, and a variety of other effects.

== T ==
- Table shuffle – a variation of the riffle shuffle, often used by dealers in casinos, in which the deck's halves are placed flat on the table with their rear corners touching. The back edges are then lifted with the thumbs while the halves are pushed together.
- Talking – inadvertent noises made by the props which can give away the trick.
- Tenkai palm – to palm between the thumb and the palm.
- Thumb palm – to palm in the crotch of the thumb.
- Thumb tip – A popular magician's prop consisting of a hollow plastic thumb that fits on the end of your thumb. Used to make small objects disappear and re-appear.
- Thumper – A device typically used by an accomplice in the audience to signal to a magician what a subject has selected, commonly used in mentalism.
- Topit – a large inner jacket pocket used to dispose items quickly, usually in a vanishing effect.
- Torn and Restored (also called TnR) – a trick in which the magician rips something up into many pieces and then "restores" it.
- Tourniquet – see French drop.

== W ==
- Woofle dust – see Magic dust.
- Wand – A slender stick typically used by a magician as a symbol of magic as well as a device used for both direction and misdirection. The stereotypical magician's wand is black with white tips although many other types exist.

== Z ==
- Zarrow shuffle – A blind shuffle, that appears to be an honest riffle shuffle to spectators and leaves the deck entirely in its original order.
- Zombie Ball – A ball that floats around, usually under the cover of a cloth.
