= John Hamman =

American magician (1927–2000)

Brother John Charles Hamman S.M. (September 3, 1927 – December 5, 2000) was a close-up magician and Marianist Brother. The tricks he invented are still an integral part of many close-up magician's repertoire. Hamman was world-renowned in the magic community. His initial interest in the art started as a child. As he recuperated from polio, he spent hours learning, practicing and inventing card tricks and other magic involving sleight-of-hand. In many cases, he "reinvented" classic maneuvers or streamlined them. He was a member of the International Brotherhood of Magicians, the Catholic Magicians' Guild and the Society of American Magicians.

== Career ==
Hamman created more than 100 card magic tricks throughout his career. Among the many tricks he invented, he is best known for the Hamman Count, a sleight-of-hand in which cards are falsely counted to give the impression that the magician holds more, or less, than he actually does. He authored many books and videos on magic and was invited to many local, national and international level (including FISM) magician gatherings to display his prowess and ability with cards.

In 1995, Bro. Hamman was the first living magician to be honored during the first St. Louis Magical Heritage Awards, the "Hall of Fame" for local magicians. Professional magicians referred to Bro. Hamman as the "Magical Marianist." In his acceptance speech, Hamman explained the key to a successful magic performance:

The object of magic is misdirection. Audiences are more apt to believe what they hear than what they see, and intelligent people are the easiest to fool because they don't expect me to use some childish gimmick to deceive them. On the other hand, children are hard to fool, because they watch closely and don't listen.

His first major publication was "The Card Magic of Bro. John Hamman, S.M.," published by Paul LePaul in 1958. In his foreword, LePaul wrote,

Brother John Hamman leads you down the garden path to the exact spot where he wants you and then, he turns on the sprinkler.

The major collection of Hamman's work was and remains "The Secrets of Brother John Hamman," written and illustrated by Richard J. Kaufman in 1989. It is one of the best-selling books in magic and was highly acclaimed upon publication, containing 80 items.

Among magicians, Bro. Hamman is still known as a Magician's Magician. The highest honor the magic community can bestow on one of its own, it refers to one's ability to amaze even fellow conjurers. Despite this, his first love was doing magic for his students.

== Personal life ==
Bro. Hamman was born in St. Louis, Missouri, to Godfrey and Olivia (née Ruoff) Hamman. He was one of two boys and a girl. The Loretto Sisters and Sisters of Saint Joseph taught him at St. Luke and St. Rose grade schools before he entered McBride High School in September, 1941. Influenced by Fr. John G. Leies and by his older brother Donald, who was already a Marianist candidate, the young John became a postulant at Maryhurst in 1942. He pronounced first vows at Marynook in Galesville, Wisconsin, on August 15, 1945, and final vows on July 10, 1951. In 1995 he celebrated the 50th anniversary of his religious profession as a Marianist.

Bro. Hamman earned a bachelor's degree in education from the University of Dayton in 1948 and an M.A. in English from St. Louis University in 1963. In the fall of 1948 he began his teaching career at Central Catholic Marianist High School in San Antonio, where he taught English. A year later he was assigned to St. Michael's High School in Chicago, where he stayed for two and a half years. In January, 1952 he was assigned to DeAndreis High School in St. Louis for the spring semester. Following this brief assignment, Brother John went to Coyle High School in August, 1952. Shortly thereafter, in October of the same year, he was diagnosed with a severe case of polio. He spent two years at Maryhurst recuperating.

Due to his illness, Bro. Hamman was only able to teach on a limited schedule. He was assigned to St. Mary's High School in 1954. After seven years, he returned to Central Catholic High School for a year before going to St. John Vianney High School in 1965. He was able to continue teaching there until he retired in 1986. Due to declining health and congestive heart failure, he was assigned to the Marianist Residence in San Antonio in 1995.

== Death ==
Brother John Hamman died on December 5, 2000, at the St. Joseph Healthcare Center in San Antonio, Texas, at age 73. He is interred in the Marianist Cemetery on the campus of St. Mary's University in San Antonio. Brother John's personal letters, documents, poetry, and writings are held at the National Archives Marianist Province in San Antonio, Texas, close to St. Mary's University.

== Famous quotes ==
Magic happens not in the hands of the performer, but in the minds of the spectators.

— Bro. John Hamman, Introduction to The Secrets of Brother John Hamman (1989)

== Original magic tricks ==
- 1-2-3-4 Ascanio
- 1-2-3-4 Mates
- 12345 Peek Thought
- Acey-Deucy
- Adventures of the Spotted
- Alternative triplet
- Amorphous Ace, The
- Axes and Jaxes, The
- Billy the Kid
- Blind Chance
- Blushing Joker
- Chameleon Blues
- Chinese Shuffle
- Computer Deck
- Cream Rises to the Top
- Deck in Parvo
- Devilish Miracle Retold
- Diminishing Card to Dollar
- Disobedient Cards, The
- Do as I Do Aces
- Double Take
- Double-Deal Aces
- Double-Deal Vanish
- Eight Ball Queens
- Fabulous Expanding Card
- False Witness, The
- Fan-to-See
- Final Aces
- Five Kings Royal
- Flash Poker
- Flight of Four
- Flip Flop Aces
- Four Pocket Mirror
- Four-tunate Choice
- Go Fish
- Hal-Deuce-Ination
- Hamman Count
- Hippity-Hop Kings
- Homing Card, The
- Homing Card to Ter-ick-ific
- Houdini Escapes
- Interplay
- Invisible Card, The
- Jacks Come Back, The
- Kings Through The Table
- Knavish Deuces, The
- Ladies Man, The
- Liar's Lie
- Lie Detector Case, The
- Lolopolooza Hand, The
- Magic Box
- Magic Cards, The
- Magician Matches Spectator
- Magician Over Gambler
- Marx Brothers, The
- Micro-Macro
- Multiplying Kings, The
- My Lucky Day
- Mystic Nine, The
- Old Classic, The
- Opposite Pockets
- Out of Print
- Peek Look Think
- Pesky Card, The
- Phoenix Four
- Pickpocket
- Pinochle Trick, The
- Poker Palm Shift
- Queens and Nines
- Revenge on the Pink Panthers
- Rook's Tour
- Routines with Queens and Nines
- Royal Gambol
- Runic Nines
- Sealed-Room Mystery
- Second Deal
- Seeing with the Fingertips
- Seven O'clock Trick
- Seven, The
- Signed Card, The
- Skipping Jacks
- Spectator Outdeals
- Magician ... Almost
- Stun-sational
- Tell-Tale Tongue
- Thought Card in Case
- Thought Cards Across
- Three Guesses
- Thunderstruck
- Transparent Cards
- Triple Cross
- Triple Match
- Twins, The
- Twisting Revisited
- Two-Card Trick, The
- Two-Shuffles Harry
- Underground Transposition
- Universal Card
- Up the Down Sleeve
- Vanishing Cream
- Watch me like a Hawk
- What and Where Test
- Wild all the Way
- Wild Card
- Zarrow shuffle (Hamman's Version)

== Bibliography ==
- Kaufman, Richard (1989). The Secrets of Brother John Hamman. John Hamman (1st ed.). Washington, D.C.: Kaufman and Greenberg. OCLC 818588427.
- Le Paul, Paul (1958). The Card Magic of Bro. John Hamman S.M. John Hamman (2nd ed.). St. Louis, MO. OCLC 79339945.
- Rataj, Don (2011). Linden, Roger (ed.). The History of Magic in St. Louis (1st ed.). International Brotherhood of Magicians. OCLC 900484193.

== Videography ==
- John Hamman (2003). Lost Works of Bro. John Hamman (DVD). Additional commentary by Richard Kaufman. Produced by Geno Munari. Houdini Picture Corporation. (Note: This six-DVD set covers 97 Hamman effects. They were not shot, nor were designed, as demonstrations per se. Rather, the video was shot as a kind of video notebook for Richard Kaufman. Many of the effects shown on the DVDs were written up in Kaufman's book, The Secrets of Brother John Hamman.)
