= Doug McKenzie (magician) =

British magician

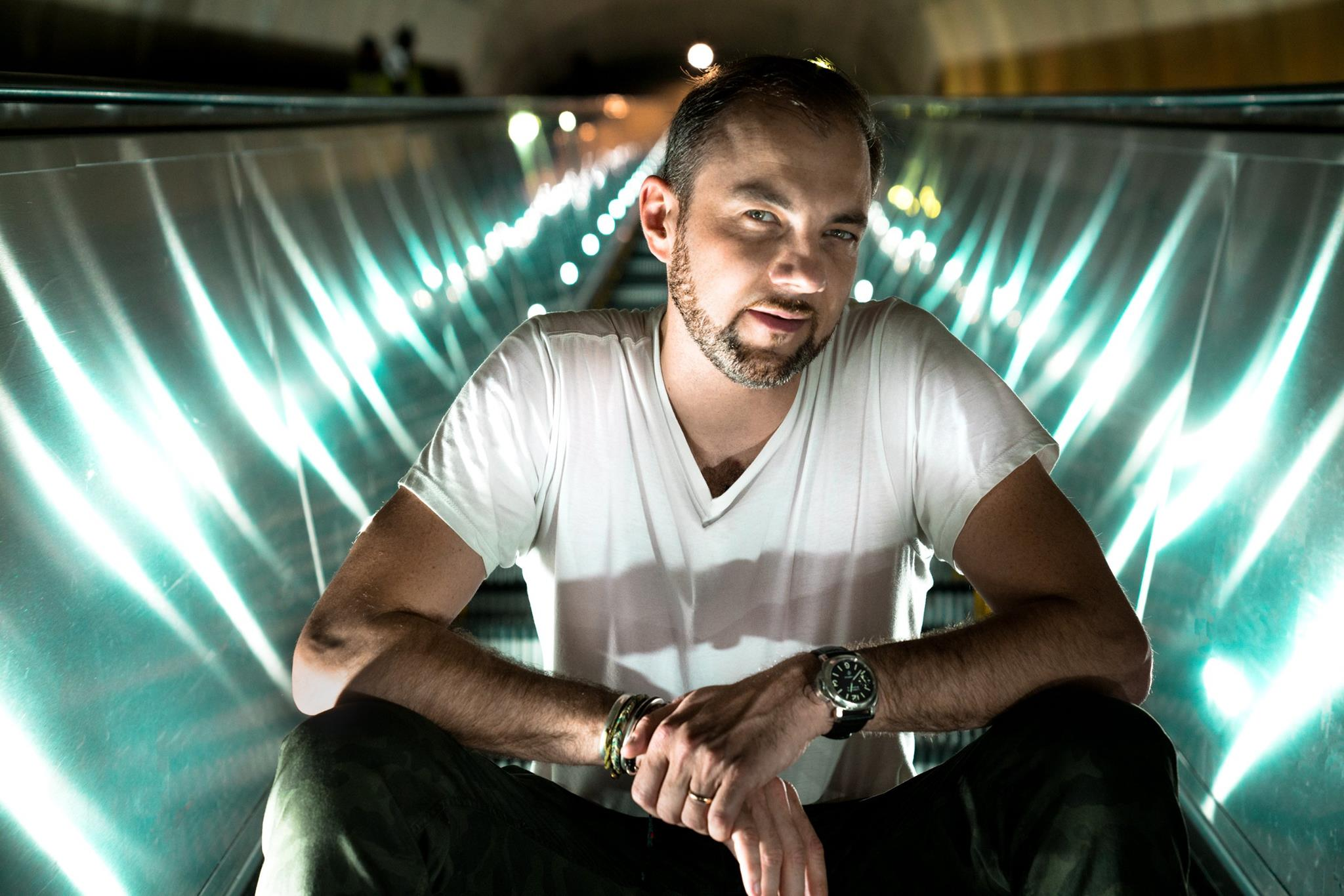
- Born: 19 June 1980 (age 46); Stirling, Scotland
- Occupations: Magician, mentalist, magic consultant, TV producer
- Website: dougmckenzie.com

Doug McKenzie (born 19 June 1980 in Stirling, Scotland) is a magician, mentalist, magic consultant, and magic television producer based in New York City. His brand of magic - "Magic2.0" - merges traditional sleight of hand techniques with technology, using phones, robots, and artificial intelligence. Doug has been profiled on CNN by Laurie Segall in a segment titled "Magician or Hacker?"

== Performances ==
- In 2006, he stole former New York Mayor Rudy Giuliani's watch from his wrist in clear view of his 6-person security detail. The Mickey Mantle collector's watch was later auctioned back to Mayor Giuliani to raise money for charity. McKenzie was also able to steal musician John Mayer's watch.
- In 2010, McKenzie made an appearance on the Comical Radio show. In the show, McKenzie changed George Washington's face on a one-dollar bill to that of the show's host, Danny Lobell.
- In 2011, McKenzie was asked to perform for some of the top NBA stars before their pickup game in Baltimore. A short segment of the performance was filmed with LeBron James, Carmelo Anthony, and Chris Paul. The YouTube video of the performance received over 50,000 hits in its first week.
- In 2011, McKenzie made an appearance on the Australian television show Hamish and Andy's Gap Year. In the show, he successfully helped Hamish Blake gain membership to the Magic Castle in LA.

== Volunteer work ==
In January 2009, McKenzie became the Magic Director for the Conjuring Arts Research Center's Hocus Pocus Project. The project teaches magic to disadvantaged youth and adults. HPP is not magic entertainment, but magic education. The goal of the program is to empower participants by introducing them to fun and accessible magic effects that, with some effort, they will master and be able to share in other settings. As of 2011, the project runs in a Juvenile Detention Center and a number of hospitals (both adult and children) in the New York City area with plans to expand its footprint nationwide.

== Product releases ==
Doug McKenzie has released three of his effects for other magicians to learn:

- Phoneomenon – A prediction appears on a stranger's cell phone in a number of ways. Featured both in Marco Tempest and David Blaine's television specials and a Nokia mobile phone commercial.
- The Juan Hundred Dollar Bill Switch – A $1 bill visibly transforms into a $100 bill.
- Flicker – A coin production with seemly empty hands

== Television credits ==
- Sneaky Pete (2017) Starring Bryan Cranston (Technical Advisor)
- Mat Franco's Got Magic (2015) Starring Mat Franco (Producer)
- The Magic Show Story (2015) Starring Paul Daniels and Stephen Mulhern (Doug McKenzie as Himself)
- David Blaine: Real or Magic (2013) Starring David Blaine (Camera Operator and Magic Consultant)
- Hamish & Andy's Gap Year (2011) Starring Hamish Blake and Andy Lee (Doug McKenzie as Himself)
- Dynamo:Magician Impossible (2011) Starring Dynamo (Magic Consultant)
- Dive of Death ABC 2 hour television special (9/24/08) starring David Blaine (Magic Producer)
- Drowned Alive ABC 2 hour television special (5/8/06) starring David Blaine (Head Magic Consultant)
- Tornado of Fire television special starring David Copperfield (Magic Consultant)
- The Fringe, episode "Safe" (Magic Consultant)
- The Virtual Magician television series (Season 1 and 2) starring Marco Tempest (Producer and Head Magic Consultant)
- The Glass Menagerie Broadway Show starring Jessica Lange and Christian Slater (Magic Consultant)
- My Brother starring Vanessa L. Williams and Fredro Starr (Magic Consultant)
