= Dacri =

Dacri is a surname. Notable people with the surname include:

- Giovanni Dacri (died 1485), Italian Roman Catholic bishop
- Steve Dacri (1952–2011), American magician
