= Scotch and soda (disambiguation) =

Scotch and soda is a cocktail of Scotch whisky and carbonated water.

Scotch and soda or Scotch and Soda may also refer to:

- Scotch and soda (magic trick), a magic trick
- Scotch & Soda (clothing), a Dutch fashion brand
- "Scotch and Soda" (song), a song by The Kingston Trio
