= Comical =

Comical may refer to:

- Comedy, a genre of fiction intended to be humorous
- Comical Radio, a weekly comedy radio show in New York City
