= Eternally Yours (film) =

1939 film by Tay Garnett

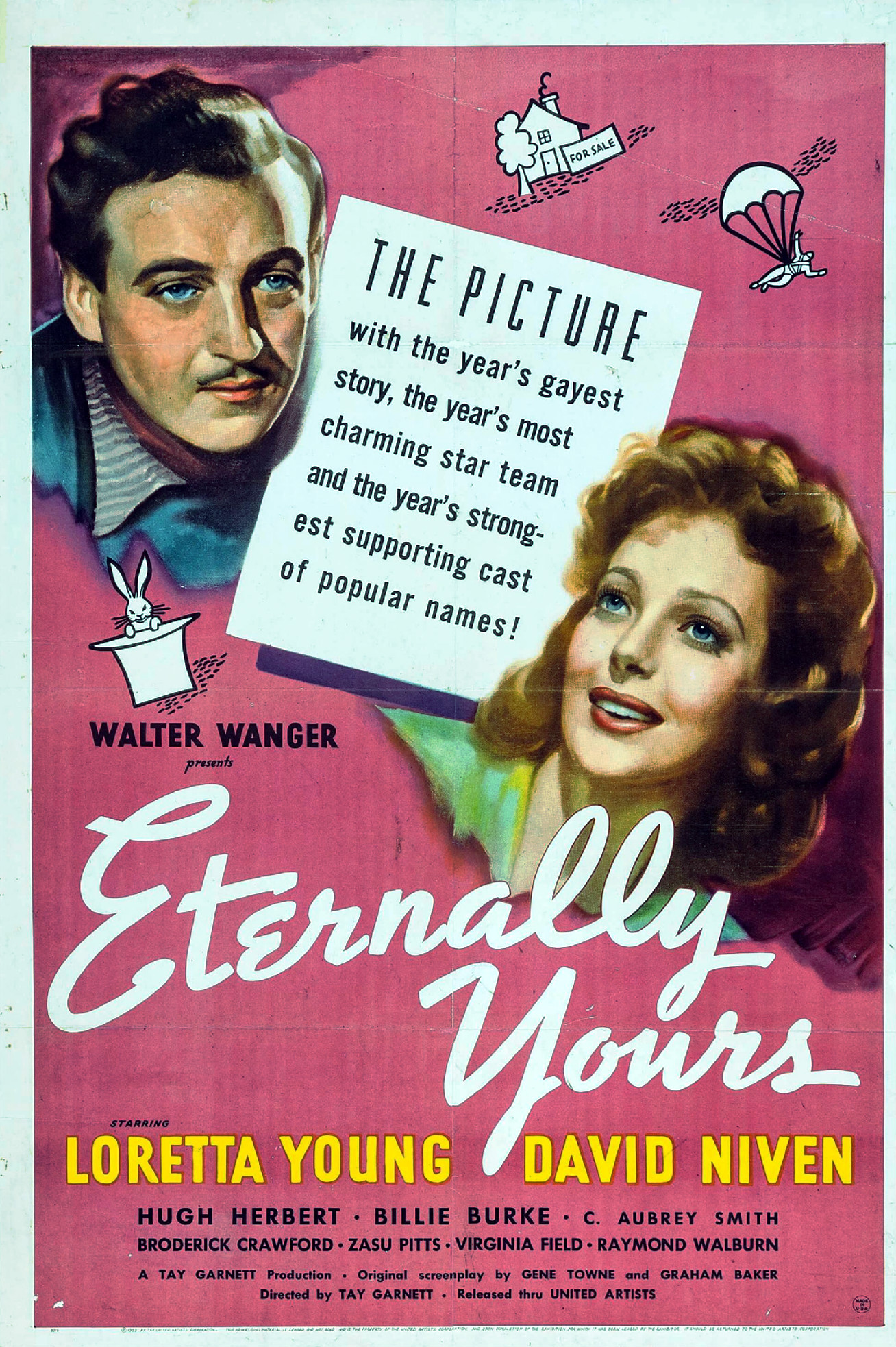
- Film poster
- Directed by: Tay Garnett; Charles Kerr (assistant)
- Written by: C. Graham Baker; Gene Towne
- Produced by: Tay Garnett; Walter Wanger (uncredited executive producer)
- Starring: Loretta Young; David Niven
- Cinematography: Merritt B. Gerstad
- Music by: Werner Janssen
- Production company: Walter Wanger Productions
- Distributed by: United Artists
- Release date: October 7, 1939 (United States)
- Running time: 95 minutes
- Country: United States
- Language: English
- Budget: $790,878
- Box office: $683,131

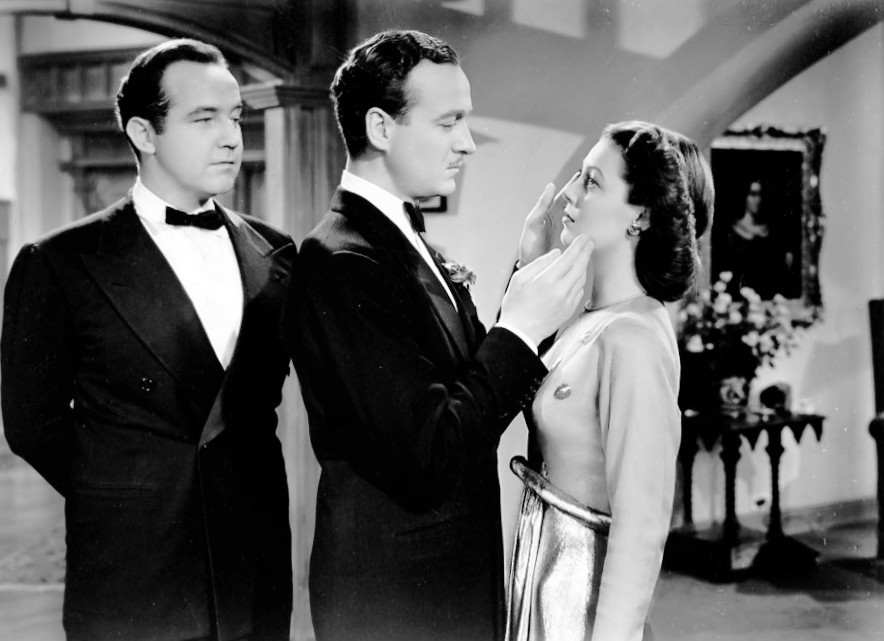
L-R: Broderick Crawford, David Niven, and Loretta Young

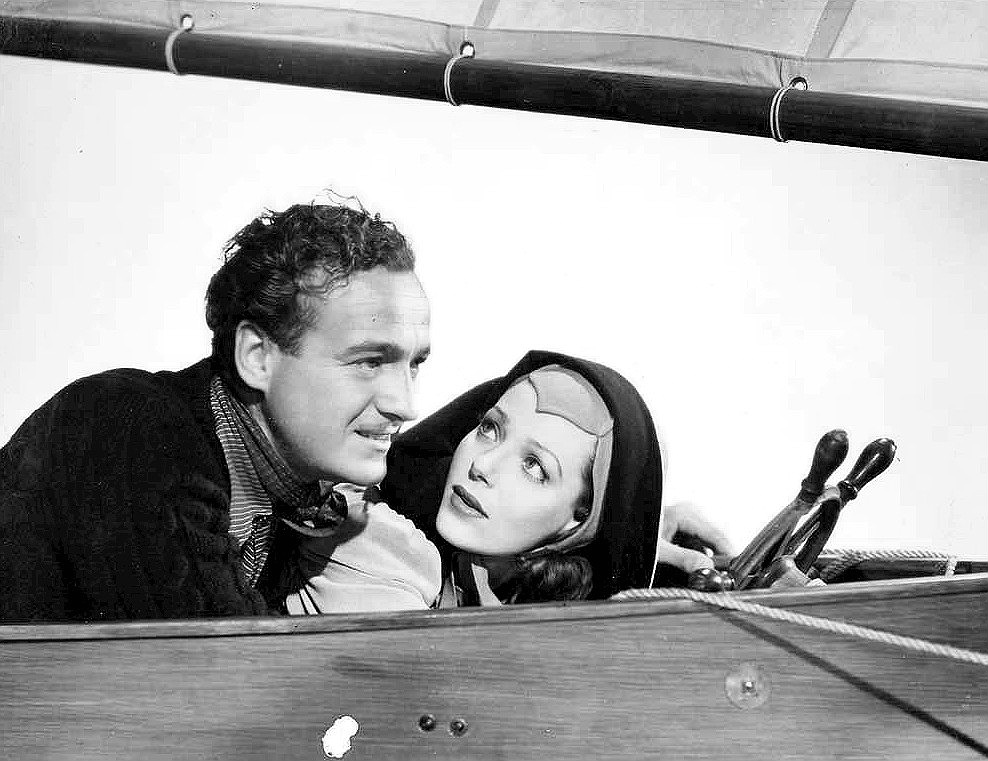
David Niven and Loretta Young

Eternally Yours (aka Whose Wife) is a 1939 American comedy drama film produced and directed by Tay Garnett with Walter Wanger as executive producer, from a screenplay by C. Graham Baker and Gene Towne. The film stars Loretta Young and David Niven, and also features a strong supporting cast including Broderick Crawford, Billie Burke, Eve Arden, ZaSu Pitts, and C. Aubrey Smith. Composer Werner Janssen was nominated for the Academy Award for Best Music.

== Plot ==
Anita Halstead (Loretta Young) goes to see a magic act performed by Tony (David Niven), the "Great Arturo", after her bridal shower for her wedding to Don Burns (Broderick Crawford). Anita and Tony are immediately attracted to each other and get married. She becomes his assistant in the act.

One night, Tony becomes drunk in the company of a woman reporter and boasts he will jump out of an aircraft at 15,000 feet (4,600 m) with his hands handcuffed behind his back. When she prints his claim, he first tries to get out of it with a fake cast on his arm, but when he sees the thousands of fans, he goes through with it, freeing himself in mid-air and parachuting safely to the ground. He promises Anita that he will not attempt the dangerous stunt again, but soon breaks his word and performs it repeatedly all over the world.

Anita becomes weary of the constant travel and longs to settle down and start a family. Secretly, she sells her jewelry and has a house built in the Connecticut countryside. When it is completed, she shows Tony a picture of it, but his uninterested reaction stops her from telling him it is theirs. When he signs up for a two-year, round-the-world tour rather than take the vacation he had promised, she finally gives up. She leaves him and gets a divorce in Reno. Anita's grandfather, Bishop Peabody (C. Aubrey Smith), breaks the news to the distraught Tony.

On a sea cruise with her Aunt Abby (Billie Burke), Anita is surprised to run into her old fiancé Don. She gets the ship's captain to marry them. However, she spends their honeymoon night with her grandfather. The next night, Don insists on introducing her to his boss, Harley Bingham (Raymond Walburn), at a nightclub. The entertainment is none other than the Great Arturo, with his old assistant, Lola De Vere (Virginia Field). He soon persuades Bingham to let him perform at Bingham's company retreat at a resort, much to Anita's discomfort.

Mrs. Bingham (ZaSu Pitts) has a dilemma, though. They have not booked enough rooms to provide separate bedrooms for the unmarried Tony and Lola. Tony suggests he and Don share one room, while Anita and Lola take the other. During his stay, Tony tries unsuccessfully to persuade Anita to take him back. Meanwhile, the hapless Don becomes sick, and the doctor prescribes no physical activity of any sort for a month.

Bishop Peabody is told by his lawyer that Anita's divorce is not legal. Later, he informs his granddaughter that Tony will be doing his parachute stunt that day. She attends. Tony tells his valet and friend Benton (Hugh Herbert) that he hid a lockpick in the wrong airplane, but goes ahead with the trick anyway. He frees himself dangerously close to the ground. After he is pulled unconscious out of the water, Anita rushes to his side. When he regains consciousness, they are reconciled. In the final scene, they enter their Connecticut home.

== Cast ==
- Loretta Young as Anita Halstead
- David Niven as Tony, "The Great Arturo"
- Hugh Herbert as Benton
- Billie Burke as Aunt Abby
- C. Aubrey Smith as Gramps, aka Bishop Peabody
- Raymond Walburn as Mr. Harley Bingham
- ZaSu Pitts as Mrs. Cary Bingham
- Broderick Crawford as Don Burns
- Virginia Field as Lola De Vere
- Eve Arden as Gloria, a friend of Anita's
- Ralph Graves as Mr. Morrisey
- Lionel Pape as Mr. Howard
- Fred Keating as Master of Ceremonies
- Mary Field as Peabody's Housekeeper

== Production ==
Originally, producer Walter Wanger had planned to film Sacha Guitry's 1917 play L'Illusionniste (based on the illusionists Émile Isola and Vincent Isola), but the Production Code Administration deemed it too risqué for filming. Screenwriters Gene Towne and G. Graham Baker made so many changes that Wanger eventually billed the film as an original screenplay. Wanger and director Tay Garnett used footage of their around the world trip that they shot for Trade Winds (1938), their previous collaboration. Eternally Yours also featured footage from the 1939 New York World's Fair.

Paul LePaul, the magician who was a technical adviser to Eternally Yours has a cameo doing card tricks with Hugh Herbert. Tay Garnett also has a bit part in the film. (Note: Eternally Yours was Loretta Young's first film after losing her contract at 20th Century Fox. She had previously starred in Wanger's Shanghai (1935).)

Paul Mantz performed aerial stuntwork and photography for the film. Two aircraft in Eternally Yours were:

- Stinson Model A
- Ford Trimotor 4ATD s/n 24, NC5578

== Reception ==
Frank S. Nugent in his review for The New York Times, said: "....the love affair between Loretta Young and David Niven in "Eternally Yours" (at the Roxy) is certain to provoke its fair share of local interest and comment. To begin with, it is a gratifyingly high-toned affair in which chinchilla coats, de luxe world tours, champagne hangovers and lodges in the Adirondacks are tossed about as freely and familiarly as the average person tosses off a blue-plate lunch. But its real novelty is Mr. Niven as a magician and Miss Young as the lady he first carelessly causes to disappear, and then pursues to the four corners of the earth."

Variety magazine was more succinct, noting, the film, "... will have to depend on name power to get it by." Overall, Eternally Yours recorded a loss of $107,747.

== See also ==
- List of films in the public domain in the United States
