= Glorpy =

Close-up magic trick

Glorpy, sometimes known as the Haunted Handkerchief, is a close-up magic trick. The effect is that a ghost or spirit is captured in a folded handkerchief that then makes the handkerchief move. This effect is also used in demonstrations of spirit writing when shown in a seance or mentalism context. Simple versions have been performed for years. A modern version by John Madden and Bernie Trueblood was created circa 1960 and declared the "Trick of the Millennium" by Genii, the conjurer's magazine.

== Effect ==
A silk pocket handkerchief is laid down on a table. The magician snatches a ghost named Glorpy out of the air and traps it in the handkerchief by folding it over. Initially shy, after some prompting the ghost begins to move about under the handkerchief and even raise it into the air. Glorpy is released by opening the handkerchief, revealing it to be empty once again.

== Description ==
Classic versions of the trick are performed using a spoon and fork. The fork is initially held unseen by the magician, who introduces the trick and produces a handkerchief. The handkerchief is folded in half to form a rectangle and laid on the table with the long axis pointed towards the magician. Using sleight of hand, the fork is placed on the table under the handkerchief at the same time, with the tines facing upward near the edge of the table nearest the magician. The magician then produces a spoon, which is inserted into the handkerchief so it lies between the folds of the handkerchief, positioned so it is over the fork. Performing a flourish with both hands over the handkerchief, the magician presses down on the tines of the fork with his thumb, causing the handle to lever and force the spoon upward.

The improved version replaces the fork with a prepared metal wire, possibly cut from a wire coat hanger but generally using thinner metal. The wire is prepared by bending the very end to 90 degrees, forming a long L-shape. A handkerchief with a hem around the outside edge is also needed. A small hole is cut into the corner of the handkerchief and the wire inserted into the hem, long straight end first. When the wire is fully inserted, some fishing about is needed to get the bent end to turn the corner so it is trapped in the corner of the hem. The trick then proceeds as normal, but repeatedly folds the handkerchief so the bent tip ends up in a known location, often an edge or corner of the folds. Pressing on the bent corner causes the opposite end to rise up.

== See also ==
Glorpy is very similar to another common trick known as the zombie ball, both in presentation and method.
