= Darwin Ortiz =

American magician (1948–2023)

Darwin Ortiz (1948 – 2023) was a magician who was an authority on gambling and card manipulation.

== Life and work ==
Ortiz was born and raised in New York City, where he had a keen interest in card tricks since childhood. His first exposure to sleight-of-hand was via card cheats in his neighborhood. In 1974, he dropped out of NYU Law School and pursued card magic full-time. During that time, he initially supported himself playing blackjack (using card counting techniques) and as an instructor at Harry Lorayne's memory school in New York City. Ortiz was a contemporary and close friend of the influential US coin magician, David Roth, and was initially mentored by the seminal British/US close-up performer, Derek Dingle.

Ortiz later became a consultant to a number of casinos in the United States, Europe, Africa, UK and Australasia, and was a regular featured presenter for a succession of years at the World Gaming Congress in Nevada.

Ortiz died on October 13, 2023, after suffering from Parkinson's disease.

== Books ==
Ortiz was a highly esteemed author of magic and gambling books. Ortiz was not only a magician, but also a highly proficient card mechanic, specializing in the sleight-of-hand techniques used by professional card cheats (such as crooked dealing and stacking the deck). He was particularly respected for his written contributions on the theory of magic. According to Vanishing Inc Magic, "Darwin Ortiz is unparalleled in his theoretical writings. His two theory books, Designing Miracles and Strong Magic are, in our estimation, some of the most important writings on magic written in the last two decades."

His book Strong Magic focuses on practical presentational techniques for close-up magicians. Ortiz's second book on magic theory, Designing Miracles is an exposition on the design of powerful magical effects, and is subtitled Creating the Illusion of Impossibility. The book posits and analyzes various theories regarding the perception and cognition of lay audiences and provides practical examples and advice on the construction of effects, aimed at maximizing their impact and deceptiveness to a lay audience.

The last book published with Darwin Ortiz's original routines was Lessons in Card Mastery.

Ortiz's major work for the lay public on gaming protection is Gambling Scams 1984. He also authored an annotation of S. W. Erdnase's The Expert at the Card Table titled The Annotated Erdnase in 1991 which was published to the magic trade.

== Bibliography ==
Notable works published by Darwin Ortiz include:

- Gambling Scams (1984)
- Darwin Ortiz on Casino Gambling (1986)
- Darwin Ortiz at the Card Table (1988)
- The Annotated Erdnase (1991)
- Strong Magic (1994)
- CardShark (1995)
- Scams and Fantasies with Cards (2002)
- Designing Miracles (2007)
- Darwin Ortiz Lessons in Card Mastery (2012)
