= Detachable thumb =

Illusion

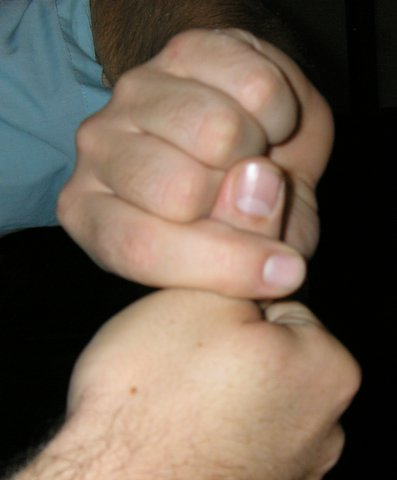
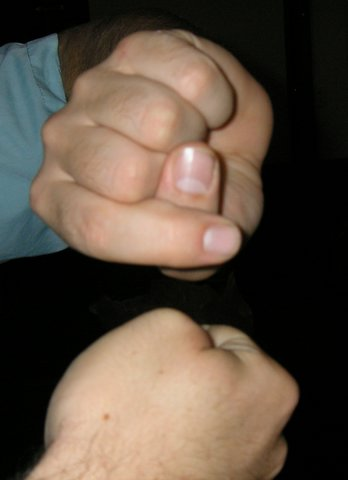
The two stages of the detachable thumb illusion

The detachable thumb is a close-up illusion in which the performer appears to remove a section of their own thumb. Its originator is unknown.

== Effect ==
The performer appears to remove the end of their own thumb; moving it back and forth along their hand or lifting it up.

== Method ==
There is no particular secret to this illusion: the performer simply holds out one hand sideways with the palm out and the tip of the thumb folded down behind the hand. Then, they place their other thumb bent so that the tip appears to be connected to the folded-down thumb with the forefinger bent to cover the joint.

== See also ==
- Thumb tip
