= Thomas Solomon (magician) =

American escape artist and magician (born 1969)

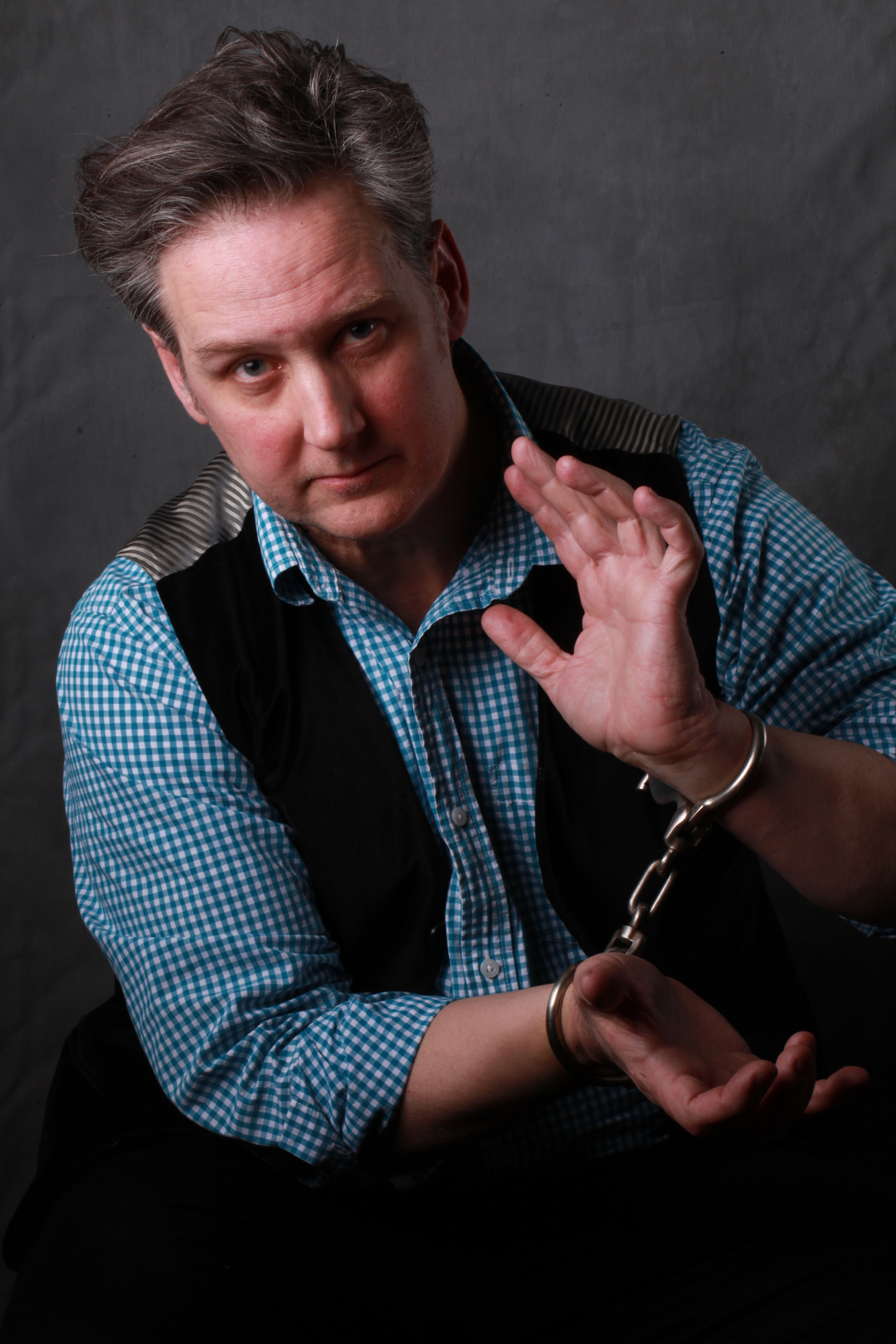
- Born: 1969 (age 56–57); Milwaukee, Wisconsin, U.S.
- Education: University of Wisconsin (BA Psychology)
- Occupations: Magician, Escape Artist
- Spouse: Francesca Biondolillo (m. 2000; div. 2010)
- Website: thomassolomon.com

Thomas Solomon (born 1969 in Milwaukee, Wisconsin) is an American escape artist and magician.

He has performed 19 jailbreak escapes during his career. Solomon is noted for escaping from Al Capone’s former jail cell in Philadelphia and has also carried out safe escape performances, including one underwater for a British television broadcast.

== Biography ==
He was born in Milwaukee, Wisconsin. Solomon developed an early interest in mechanical devices. At the age of thirteen, he apprenticed with a locksmith in Milwaukee, Wisconsin, which introduced him to locks and locking mechanisms. In his late teens, he combined these skills with an interest in stage magic to create a performance act.

He honed his craft in Milwaukee, Wisconsin and Chicago nightclubs including The Limelight and later in Brooklyn, New York's Coney Island.

== Works ==
By 2013, Solomon had escaped from more than 5500 pairs of handcuffs of all different types from all times in history. He has performed underwater releases from restraints in the Hudson and East Rivers, Boston Harbor, Potomac River, Mississippi, and numerous others.

He won the coveted "World's Greatest Escape Artist" award from the Academy of Magical Arts and Sciences. He performed his handcuff escape act, escaping the restraints of the Los Angeles Police Department on the televised World Magic Awards in 2000.

He has accomplished hundreds of straitjacket releases, most notably an escape from the all-leather straitjacket specifically created to thwart him by Menkes Leather Works. He escaped a tightly bound straitjacket in the pouring rain hanging upside down from a tower crane 150 feet above the street in Portland, Oregon in 2006.

He has performed aboard ships for Royal Caribbean Cruise Line traveling throughout Bermuda and the Caribbean.

He has also performed at Hollywood's Magic Castle, Bally's, Mohegan Sun, MK and many others. His other performances include escapes from wooden crates nailed closed, antique pillories, asylum restraints, canvas bags and rope ties.

In 1988 he entertained President Ronald Reagan at the White House where he escaped the handcuffs of the Uniformed Secret Service.

He performed again in 1989 for President George Bush and Vice-President Dan Quayle at the White House. He has performed escapes and magic for major trade show clients, Ford Motor Company, State Farm Insurance, Procter & Gamble, Absolut Vodka, 'Winston/Salem Cigarettes, Compaq Computers, Deutsche Bank, Birdseye Frozen Foods, Black and Decker among others. He starred in the Off-Broadway show, Theatre of the Macabre which played three years and more than 1700 performances in Manhattan's Greenwich Village.

Recently, Solomon performed an underwater handcuff escape at the New York Aquarium in which members of the New York Police Department locked him in four pairs of handcuffs. In forty degree frigid water, he escaped in less than three minutes thrilling onlookers.

In 2011, the Society of American Magicians selected Thomas Solomon to star in the storied "Salute To Magic" which has seen some of magic's greatest names as performers.

Solomon performed live on the Plaza outside for Fox Television network's "Fox and Friends" in which he escaped five pairs of handcuffs in full view of the audience in under one minute.

He has created several original escapes including his "Cabinet Obscura" which allows escapes to be performed in full view of the audience. He created an on-stage water escape called "The Nuclear Aquatic Containment Trap" which was inspired by real-world storage devices that hold nuclear fuel rods.

ln this escape, Solomon is lowered into the tank that is filled with 200 gallons of ice-cold water, his head, held under water by a Locked metal top and grate that, in the presentation would hold fuel, rods in place. The audience can see his struggle to escape in the glass fronted tank. This escape has been a fixture for years in his theatrical show, "American Escape Artist."

== Career ==
In 2010, Solomon co-founded Patriotic Performers , an organization dedicated to providing free entertainment for American service members and their families, both domestically and abroad. A significant part of his work has involved appearances at military hospitals, where he has performed for wounded personnel from all branches of the armed forces. He has entertained at numerous installations, including Fort Dix, McGuire Air Force Base, Lakehurst Naval Base, Walter Reed Military Hospital, Fort Detrick, Marine Corps Base Quantico, Naval Submarine Base New London, Fort Bragg, and Andrews Air Force Base.

Solomon’s career has included performances on international stages and across major media outlets. In 1987 he performed in the Soviet Union, and in 2003 he was the subject of a British network television special, Thomas Solomon: The Escape Artist, broadcast on Channel 4. He later appeared in a pilot for the History Channel titled No Jail Can Hold Me (2007/2008). He also performed on Penn and Teller's show Fool Us.

His work has received coverage in prominent publications, including a front-page feature in the Chicago Tribune Tempo section (1986) and a profile in The New York Times (2012).

He has performed as a feature act at the prestigious Chicago Magic Lounge and performed his escape act before a sell-out crowd at Lincoln Center for the Performing Arts at the Bruno Walter Auditorium. He was also the subject of a video presentation of the Magic collection at the New York Public Library of the Performing Arts and a short interview with the New York Times.

His published works include Diaries of an Escape Artist (1998), Escape Velocity (2004) and The Wisdom of Solomon (2026).

=== Cryptography ===
He is an amateur cryptographer and commented recently on an article about on-line security in Wired Magazine in which he gave his solution to making passwords more secure.
