= Alex Elmsley =

Scottish magician and computer programmer (1929–2006)

- Born: 2 March 1929; St Andrews, Scotland
- Died: 8 January 2006 (aged 76)
- Occupations: Magician, Computer Programmer

Alex Elmsley (2 March 1929 – 8 January 2006) was a Scottish magician and computer programmer. He was notable for his invention of the Ghost Count or Elmsley Count, creating mathematical card tricks, and for publishing on the mathematics of playing card shuffling. (Note: Both Stewart and Morris refer to Elmsley's articles published in The Mathematics of the Weave Shuffle (Faro Shuffle) in The Pentagram, Vol. 11, No. 9-10-11 from June, July, August 1957.)

== Early life and career ==
He began practising magic in 1946, as a teenager. He studied physics and mathematics at Cambridge University; whilst there he was also secretary of the Pentacle Club. He was a patent agent, and later a computer expert, in his day job. Otherwise, he was an amateur card and close-up magician. He was awarded an Academy of Magical Arts Creative Fellowship in 1972.

He created a number of well-known magic tricks, including The Four Card Trick, Between Your Palms, Point of Departure and Diamond Cut Diamond.

In 1975, he briefly toured the US giving a highly praised lecture known as the "Dazzle Card Act", which consisted of a magic act followed by a detailed discussion of routining. Notes on the lecture were released under the title Cardwork. Elmsley was the subject of The Collected Works of Alex Elmsley (vol. 1 1991, vol. 2 1994).

He named the special count used in The Four Card Trick the ghost count, though it would later become known as the Elmsley Count.
