= Zombie ball =

The zombie ball is a classic magic trick first introduced by Joe Karson in the 1940s. It remains a staple of many shows to this day. Magic's Biggest Secrets called it one of the most popular tricks in the world.

== Effect ==
A large metal ball is positioned on a small pedestal on a table by the magician. The magician then holds a sizable silk cloth above the ball to cover it. The ball then begins to lift into the air and move about under the cloth, before appearing out from under cloth to roll along the upper edge of the stretched-out cloth, or along the magician's arms. The ball may also disappear and re-appear as it moves about. The ball is finally coaxed to return to its pedestal and the cloth is removed.

== Method ==
The usual way this effect is done is with a rod that clips to the finger, and is hidden from view by the cloth. By simply moving his finger (generally his thumb), the magician can achieve an almost lifelike reaction from the ball. The ball and cloth have to be moved so the rod remains invisible through the performance. Considerable practice and stagecraft is required to make it appear that the cloth is being pulled about by the ball, as opposed to being under the magician's control.

== See also ==
Glorpy, the "trick of the millennium", is essentially the zombie ball without the ball.
