= Paul LePaul =

American magician

Paul Le Paul
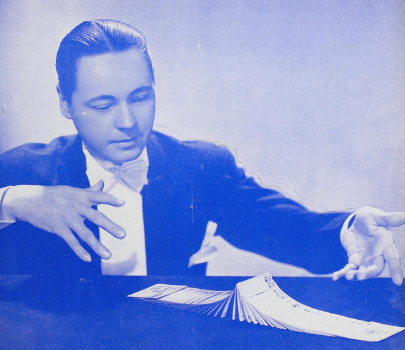
- Born: Paul Shields Braden; 2 August 1900; Olney, Illinois, United States
- Died: 8 June 1958 (aged 57)
- Occupations: Magician, performer, inventor
- Known for: Sleight of hand, card magic

Paul LePaul (August 2, 1900 – June 8, 1958) was an American magician.

== Career ==
LePaul was born Paul Shields Braden in Olney, Illinois. He grew up in St. Louis, Mo. He started his professional career around 1920, doing a manipulative act entirely with playing cards. He adopted the name LePaul around 1927. LePaul made his New York City vaudeville appearance in July 1928 at the Fifth Avenue Theater. He worked in vaudeville and later appeared in the top night clubs and hotels. He also played on Broadway in Earl Carrolls' Vanities.

He was a technical adviser for movies, including Eternally Yours (film) starring David Niven (1939). In a brief cameo he is seen doing card flourishes. In that same year, Paul LePaul was also credited for being part of the miscellaneous crew on the film Miracles for Sale.

During World War II, he performed tours with the USO.

"LePaul is one of the greatest manipulative magicians ever to practice the art of pleasant deception." - John Mulholland

LePaul was one of the first to use to the split-fan production in a professional act. At one time he also used the glass vanish under the newspaper, and may have been the first magician to use this as a stage trick. He appears to have started the Card to Wallet fad among magicians which was based on the routine he published as "Cards in Sealed Envelope" in the late 1940s. (Wallets did not become a common item until after the 1950s).

== Published works ==
- The Card Magic of LePaul (1949)
- The Card Magic of Brother John Hamman (written and edited by LePaul) (1959)

== See also ==
- List of magicians
- Card magic
- Sleight of hand
- Card flourish
