= Retention of vision =

Term in conjuring

Retention of vision is a conjuring term referring to the perceived image of an object during a vanish (usually associated with vanishing coins). In a retention of vision vanish, the spectator sees a coin placed on a palm and as the fingers are closed around the coin it is secretly removed, but because the retina still retains a fleeting image of the coin for a fraction of a second, the spectator will be convinced that the coin was placed in the hand, when in fact it wasn't. It works due to the phenomenon known as persistence of vision, which is in wide use in animation and related fields too.
