= Daniel Lobell =

American stand-up comedian

- Born: 1982 or 1983 (age 42–43); Queens, New York
- Education: Baruch College
- Occupations: Stand-up comedian, podcaster, comic-book writer
- Years active: 2007-present
- Website: www.dannylobell.com

Daniel Lobell is a Los Angeles–based American stand-up comedian, podcaster, and comic-book writer best known for his podcast Modern Day Philosophers. Comedian Marc Maron credits him with creating the first podcast focused on stand-up comedy, Comical Radio.

He has released two comedy albums on Dan Schlissel's Stand Up! Records. He also created and writes the autobiographical comic book Fair Enough, also published by Stand Up!.

== Personal life ==
Lobell was born to Jewish parents in the New York City borough of Queens and grew up on Long Island. He is the oldest of four boys. Lobell's family has roots in the Scottish and Turkish Jewish communities. Though raised in a religious family, he was interested in comedy from a young age, inspired by Jerry Seinfeld, Adam Sandler, and Jim Carrey. Lobell fell away from his Orthodox faith in his 20s when starting as a comedian, but returned when his fiancé converted to Judaism before their marriage in 2015. Lobell graduated from Baruch College in New York.

== Career ==
Lobell has been performing stand-up since he was a teenager in New York. His comedy is frequently autobiographical, often a combination of stand-up and storytelling focusing on Jewish culture and faith, and Lobell's unusual status as an Orthodox Jewish comedian. Lobell will not perform or travel on the Sabbath. Despite his belief, Lobell's comedy often covers taboo topics such as sex.

Lobell befriended Jackie Mason, George Carlin, and Shelley Berman after interviewing Mason for his college newspaper; Mason and Carlin became important mentors in his early career. He also worked for Mason selling audio cassettes after Mason's shows. A fan of comic writer Harvey Pekar, Lobell struck up a friendship with him by cold-calling Pekar at his house in Cleveland.

=== Podcasts ===
From 2004 to 2012, Lobell ran the podcast Comical Radio, on which he interviewed more than 1,000 comedians. In 2009, he created a webseries based on Comical Radio, Rise of the Radio Show, which featured performances from Patrice O'Neal, Colin Quinn, J.B. Smoove, Dave Attell, and Brian Posehn. Lobell shuttered Comical Radio in 2012 and moved to Los Angeles to expand his career.

Lobell began a new podcast, Modern Day Philosophers, in 2013 with the idea of approaching classical philosophy through the lens of stand-up comics, who Lobell felt were the philosophers of the modern age, telling one interviewer, "my feeling is that all the knowledge in the world is accessible to everybody, it's just sometimes hidden in code." Guests have included Marc Maron, Reggie Watts, and Maria Bamford.

He also hosts medical website Doctorpedia's Leading Voices podcast.

=== Comedy albums ===
Lobell has released two albums on Stand Up! Records, 2013's Some Kind of Comedian and 2017's The Nicest Boy in Barcelona. Reviewer Richard Lanoie, writing on The Serious Comedy Site, called Some Kind of Comedian unfocused but said "there is a hell of a lot to like." Chris Milea of Stage Time magazine called the album "quite clever" and praised Lobell's "notable amount of ingenuity and risk-taking." Reviews of Barcelona were stronger. Chris Spector of Midwest Record said Lobell had "mastered doing the observational thing without hitting you with it like a flying mallet", while Lanoie called Barcelona a "rock solid" improvement on Lobell's first album.

=== Comics ===
Lobell was an avid artist from childhood, and was inspired to pursue a career in comics by the examples of Stan Lee and Harvey Pekar. In 2018, Lobell began an autobiographical comic book, Fair Enough. The first issue covers his troubled school-age years and friendship with Pekar.

=== Other work ===
Lobell performs regularly at the Laugh Factory and the Hollywood Improv in Los Angeles. He has been a guest twice on the WTF with Marc Maron podcast.

In 2017, Lobell performed his autobiographical stand-up show Broke as a Joke at the Edinburgh Fringe Festival and Hollywood Fringe Festival. The show covers a number of Lobell's often-bizarre self-started business ventures, including stints as a breeder of hairless cats, a door-to-door lightbulb salesman, cleaning shark tanks in the Israeli city of Eilat, and raising chickens with his neighbor, an Ecuadorian gang member. Lobell followed in 2018 with Fat Chance, about his struggles with obesity. He has performed multiple times at the Glasgow International Comedy Festival.

He performed in and contributed writing for Hasidic comic Mendy Pellin's 2014 series Jewbellish the News.

He directed a short film in 2018 entitled 'Stool Me Once' starring Michael Croner that was filmed and edited by Bruno Kohfield-Galeano.

His work has been featured on This American Life and TedX. He is a frequent essayist for various publications focused on Jewish life, including The Jewish Journal of Greater Los Angeles and the website Aish.com.

== Discography ==
- Danny Lobell, Some Kind of Comedian (Stand Up! Records, 2013)
- Danny Lobell, The Nicest Boy in Barcelona (Stand Up! Records, 2017)
