= Sylvester the Jester =

American magician

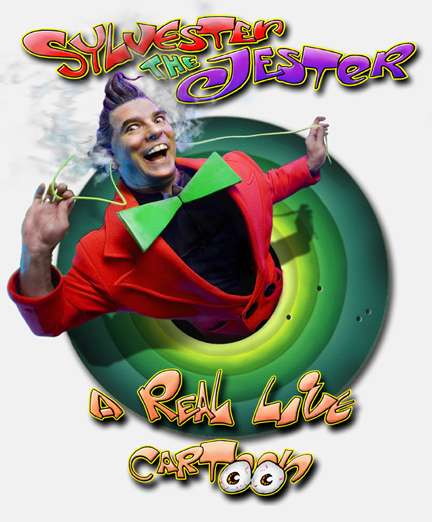
Sylvester the Jester, 2006

Daniel Sylvester Battagline, also known as Sylvester The Jester (born 1961, died April 17, 2026), was an American magician, best known for playing a cartoon character who comes to life. He had hundreds of stage and television appearances, including NBC’s "World's Wildest Magic," ABC’s "Champions of Magic III", Jerry Lewis's Muscular Dystrophy Telethon and The Discovery Channel’s "More Science of Magic." He performed in multiple Las Vegas shows including opening for The Amazing Johnathan, and appeared at Caesar’s Magical Empire. He also produced a series of magic products, and was credited with creating the illustrations for various magic publications, such as the cover for The Amazing Johnathan's Every Trick in the Book, and the poster for John Carney's "Mr. Mysto" act. In 1996, he also created a prop for the television show, "Sabrina, the Teenage Witch." He was featured on the cover of several magic and culture-related magazines, such as the September 1998 issue of Magic.

== Biography ==
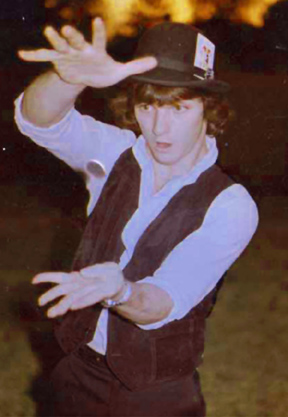
1985, "Reverse Gravity" trick

Battagline was born in Youngstown, Ohio, one of three children to Pat Battagline, a plumber, and Merrie Lou Clark, a homemaker. He grew up in the small town of Berlin Center, Ohio, attending Western Reserve High School, where he began experimenting with magic at the age of 15, after seeing a televised performance by Doug Henning. He later went on to Youngstown State University, where he studied Fine Art and Theater Arts, before relocating to Los Angeles, where he joined the prestigious Magic Castle community, and performed for the next seven years. He was best known during this time for a unique sleight of hand move known as "The Sylvester Pitch." During the 1990s, he created the "Ten Foot Pole" effect which remains popular, most recently as the topic of a 2008 TED Conference presentation about unique inventions. He was also mentored by Larry Jennings and Dai Vernon, who referred to Battagline as "a genius".

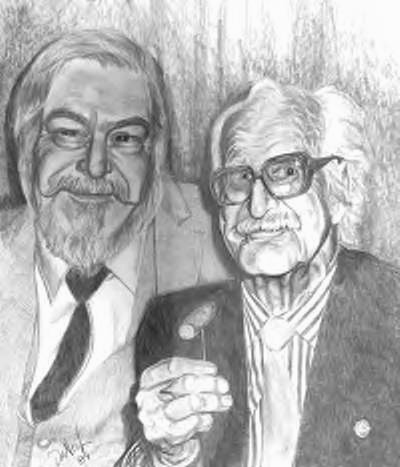
Sylvester's portrait of Larry Jennings and Dai Vernon, 1989

Battagline's "Sylvester the Jester" character began to emerge in the early 1990s, and over the next several years, he began to tour internationally in over 30 countries. He was also a key performer and creative consultant in the year-long production of "Las Vegas Magic Express" in Seoul, South Korea, which was produced by Kevin James.

At November 18, 2019, Sylvester the Jester's official Facebook page announced that Battagline has been diagnosed with Alzheimer's disease.

On June 25, 2026, it was announced that Battagline had passed away in April 17th of 2026.

== Awards ==
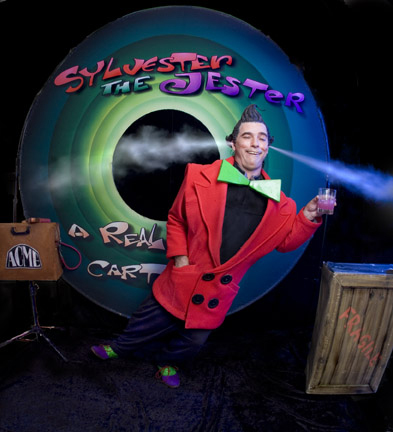
"Steam from the Ears" effect, 2002

- Baguette d'Or (Golden Wand), 1998, Monte Carlo Magic Stars, awarded by Princess Stéphanie of Monaco
- Kid's Choice, 1998, Junior Jury's Grand Prix, Monte Carlo Magic Stars
- Festival Favorite, 1998, International del Humor, Bogotá, Colombia
- Gold Medal Champion, 1995, Pacific Coast Association of Magicians (PCAM), Santa Clara, California
- Appreciation Award (50th Anniversary Special), 1996, International Brotherhood of Magicians
- The S.C.A.M. Annual Comedy Magic Award, 2007, South Carolina Association of Magicians
- Creative Fellow, 2023 The Academy of Magical Arts

=== Notable nominations ===
The Magic Castle’s Academy of Magical Arts, Los Angeles, California:

- Lecturer of the Year: 2002, 2009
- Parlour Performer of the Year: 1996, 1997, 1998, 1999, 2001, 2002, 2003, 2004
- Comedy Magician of the Year: 2003
- Stage Magician of the Year: 1998, 1999

== DVDs and videos ==
- Sylvester Pitch ‘98, 2007, Creative Enterprise/Hotrix, DVD
- Sylvester The Jester Performance, 2006, DVD
- Suspended Dimension (The Jacketless Topit), 2001, Kevin James’ Imagination Unlimited, DVD
- Sylvester Pitch ‘98, 1998, Creative Enterprise/Hotrix, VHS

== Lecture Notes ==
- Sylvester The Jester's Creativity Lecture Notes, 2008
- Sylvester Pitch Lecture Notes, 1993
- Hurtling the Moon, Creative Strategy Lecture Notes, 1995
