= The Four Burglars =

Card trick

Explanation of the Four Burglars card trick with a deck of 12 cards (solid cards are face-up; hatched cards are of the hatch colour, face-down): 1. The four jacks (blue) are revealed, one having three dummy cards hidden beneath (green).; 2. The jacks and dummy cards are gathered into a pile.; 3. The pile is turned over and placed atop the deck.; 4. The top card is placed at the bottom, the second about a third up, the third about two-thirds up and the fourth on top.; 5. The top four cards are revealed to be jacks.

The Four Burglars is a magic effect in which the magician shows the four Jacks from a deck of cards, calling them burglars, and tells a story about them entering a house in different ways (the front door, a window, another window, and the back door) as he places one of the Jacks on the bottom of the deck, one about two thirds of the way down, one about one third of the way down, and one on top. The magician then talks about the burglars hearing sirens and running around as he cuts the deck. The cards are then spread to show that the four burglars have gathered together in the center of the deck in the commotion, with some remark about "safety in numbers."

A variation involves the four Jacks robbing a bank by flying on a 'helicopter' and landing on top of the bank (the deck of cards). The magician places one in the '3rd floor', another in the '2nd floor', another in the '1st floor' (all the 'floors' are roughly divided in thirds of the deck like in the original version), and one to guard the helicopter. Then, they hear the police arrive and the burglars ascend the bank and fly off via their helicopter. The magician takes the first four cards of the deck and shows to the audience that it is the four Jacks.

== Method ==
When the four Jacks are shown, three other cards are hidden behind them. All four jacks are placed on top of the deck, and the other cards are placed in different places in the deck as the story is told.

== Sources ==
- Todd, Joseph P. Big Bag of Tricks for Boys and Girls.
