= Retention of vision vanish =

Magic trick

In the retention of vision vanish, the magician places a coin or small object between the fingers and the thumb of the right hand. The left hand is palm up with the palm slightly tilted towards the audience. The right approaches and displays the object on the left palm for a second or so, held on opposite sides of a diameter. Then the right hand moves away empty as the fingers of the left hand close over the object. After a brief pause the left hand is shown empty and the coin has disappeared. In some versions the right hand can also be seen empty, leaving no clue as to where the coin went.

Originally attributed to T. Nelson Downs, a famous magician from the late Victorian and Edwardian eras who specialised in coins, the vanish has been improved by Dai Vernon and many other 20th-century magicians who all added variations to improve the original concept that an object displayed for a short length of time leaves an image on the retina that may persist for a further short time after the object has actually disappeared.

== See also ==
- Retention of vision
