= Lisa Menna =

American magician

Lisa Menna (born July 23, 1964) is a magician and activist. Called the most influential female magician of the 20th century by BBC World Service, she was a pioneer in a male-dominated profession.

Menna gave a briefing for the High Commission of Human Rights at the United Nations focused on her work with Cause To Wonder and the use of curiosity to introduce ideas of human rights for women.

In 2019, Lisa Menna performed for the 100th anniversary of the International Labour Organization in Geneva on international women's day.

== Career ==
She was banned from learning magic at the Magic Circle Fakir Circles and Tannen's magic classes because she was female. . (Tannens).

Menna was the first woman to lecture and perform at FISM. She is only woman to have been invited to perform in every theater of the Magic Castle in Hollywood.

In 2001, she achieved notability and worldwide success performing as a trade show magician, When the Wall Street Journal reported that she brought in ten time more leads than the average trade show display, she became known as "the Darling of Dot Com".

In 2011, Menna founded Cause to Wonder, a non-profit theater organization that coordinates curiosity-based events around the world. an organization which uses performance art and education to promote human rights. The most notable programs took place in Mozambique, Antigua, Sicily, Ethiopia, Tortola, the US Virgin Islands and India. Eighteen months after regional performances that included a magic show with conservation information, a measures and impact study found 104% retention of the phrase, "A clean lake is a happy life". Evidence that the method was successful was shown in that social change ideas spread beyond the initial audience.
