= Dean Dill =

American magician and effects designer

Dean Dill (8 March 1947 – 7 February 2015) was a magician and effects designer who lived and worked in Glendale, California, US. He appeared on The Tonight Show in November 1990. His performance focused mostly on closeup effects and coin magic. He created effects, including "Dean's Box," "Blizzard", and "A New World" (created with magic innovator Michael Weber). He was also a barber, and Dean's Shoppe in Glendale became a known hangout for magicians.

He appeared on the cover of the October 2003 edition of The Linking Ring magazine.
