= Oscar Munoz (magician) =

American magician

Oscar Muñoz is an American master magician, 1999 winner of the "Gold Cups" award from the International Brotherhood of Magicians organization. Past President of the International Brother of Magicians 2017. He is also a charter member and past President of "Ring 269" in Texas.

== Magic Awards ==
- 1999, IBM "Gold Cups" winner (1st place)
- November 1997, 1st place, both parlor & stage competitions, TAOM
- 1992, Closeup competition, Texas Association of Magicians
- Texas Top Magician Award
- 2002 SAM Awards:
  - Close-up
  - Chairperson's Award for highest score
  - Jim Zee Award for Close-Up Magic

== Works ==
"The Magic within you"
