= Steve Beam =

American magician

Steve Beam (born 1958 in Fort Knox, Kentucky) is an American magician, close‑up performer, and author. He is best known for his Semi‑Automatic Card Tricks series and his long‑running underground journal The Trapdoor. Beam won the 2013 Literary & Media Fellowship from the Academy of Magical Arts.

== Early life and career ==
Beam began working part‑time as a magician in 1977, specializing in close‑up, card magic, comedy, and club performance. His books on magic are celebrated for including full, hilariously written comedic scripts.

He founded, edited, and published Trapdoor Productions from 1983 to 1998. The newsletter, The Trapdoor, became a key source of ideas and sleight-of-hand techniques for card magicians.

== Awards ==
He won the 2013 Literary and Media Fellowship Award from the Academy of Magical Arts and has twice won the Lou Gallo MVP Award. given out at the 4F Magic Convention.

== Books ==
- 1979: Magic The Vanishing Art, or How to Turn a Trick for Fun and Profit
- 1981: Steve Beam on Coins
- 1993: Semi-Automatic Card Tricks
- 2001: Hand-Picked Card Tricks
