= Dominic Reyes =

English magician and writer (born 20th century)

Dominic Reyes (born 20th century) is an English professional sleight-of-hand magician and writer.

He is noted for creating the routine "Ninja Coins", where a Chinese-style coin magically transforms into any coin that it touches.

== Career ==
A publisher and producer of magic, he also appears in the 2007 comedy film Magicians.

Reyes is a member of The Magic Circle, International Brotherhood of Magicians and The Associated Wizards of the South.

Since 1999, Reyes has published ten books and videos teaching magicians under the title The Merchant of Magic. His works are published in the U.K. and the U.S.

== Bibliography ==
- Politics and Coin Magic (1999)
- The Coin Purse – Collective Essays on Advanced Coin Magic (1999)
- The Classic Palm (2001)
- The Ninja Coins Routine (2006)

== Filmography ==
- Pressure (2006) – distributed by Murphys Magic Supplies
- Gallerian Bend DVD (2007) – distributed by Murphys Magic Supplies
- Gallerian Bend DVD (2007) – effect by Erik Castle
- Compression DVD (2007) – effect by Daniel Lachman
- Labelled and Relabelled DVD (2008) – effect by Ben Williams; published by Dominic Reyes
- One Card Link DVD (2008) – effect by Ben Williams
