= John Cassidy (magician) =

American professional comedian, magician, and balloon artist

John "BalloonFREAK" Cassidy
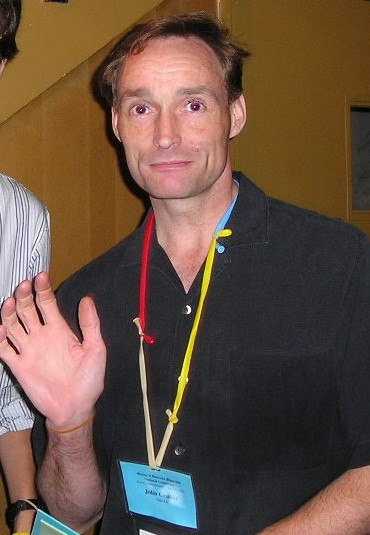
- John Cassidy at the 2005 convention of the Society of American Magicians in Boston, MA.
- Born: March 11, 1967 (age 59); New York City, United States
- Occupations: balloon artist, magician, comedian
- Spouse: Jennifer Cassidy
- Website: www.johncassidy.com

John Cassidy is a professional comedian, magician, and balloon artist who holds several Guinness World Record speed records for balloon sculpting. In November 2007, Cassidy inflated and sculpted a record 747 balloons in one hour. He secured another record when he created thirteen balloon sculptures within one minute.

Cassidy has appeared numerous times on television as either a stand-up comedian, magician or as a Guinness Book of Records celebrity. He has been a guest on Late Night with Conan O'Brien, Martha Stewart Living, The Weakest Link, NBC's Today Show, Live With Regis and Kelly, and the Jerry Lewis MDA Telethon four years in a row. He has also been featured in numerous periodicals including Better Homes and Gardens and The Philadelphia Inquirer, and he has performed at The White House, The Magic Castle, Foxwoods Casino, the Golden Nugget Las Vegas, the Flamingo Las Vegas and The Comedy and Magic Club in Hermosa Beach, CA.

The more unusual staples of his stage show include a lawn dart cannon, a "telekinetic" cymbal-banging monkey toy, and a six-foot red balloon that Cassidy climbs into to complete a magic trick.

Cassidy and his wife Jennifer are lifelong residents of the greater Philadelphia metropolitan area but regularly tour and perform dates nationwide.
