= Herb Zarrow =

American magician

- Born: November 4, 1925; Paterson, New Jersey, U.S.
- Died: May 11, 2008 (aged 82)
- Occupation(s): CPA, magician
- Known for: Card tricks, sleight of hand, Zarrow shuffle

Herbert Gershen Zarrow (November 4, 1925 – May 11, 2008) was an American magician influential in the profession for his inventions of unique sleight of hand and card tricks. The inventor of the Zarrow shuffle, his skills were held in the highest regard in professional magicians' circles.

== Biography ==
His obituary noted that he had been married for 57 years to Phyllis Roemer Zarrow, and they had two children. A certified public accountant (CPA), he was the founding partner of an accounting firm. He was also a member of B'nai B'rith, and resided in Fair Lawn, New Jersey, at the time of his death.

Zarrow appears in a DVD series about his card magic, and in magic literature, including David Ben's book Zarrow: A Lifetime of Magic.

Zarrow appeared on the cover of April 2001 issue of The Linking Ring after being honored at the 2001 annual Fechter's Finger flicking Frolic convention of close up magicians for a lifetime of contributions and achievements. The Linking Ring article contains some biographical information. An auction of Zarrow's collection, including his extensive library and associated ephemera, was conducted by Potter & Potter Auctions on October 23, 2010.

== Illusions ==
Zarrow is credited with inventing:

- Matched Revolvers
- Starfish Copper/Silver
- Zarrow Block Addition
- Zarrow Retention Pass
- Zarrow Shuffle
- Zarrow Universal Count Grip
- Zarrow's Switch Change
- Zarrow's Trapeze

== Honors and awards ==
Over the years, he received many honors:

- Member Of the Inner Magic Circle
- 1998 Louie Award
- Honorary Life Member of the Society of American Magicians
- Cover of M-U-M
- Creative Fellowship Award from the Academy of Magical Arts
- Honorary Life Member to The Magic Castle
- 2001 Guest Of Honor at Fechter's Finger flicking Frolic
- Cover of The Linking Ring
