= Val Walker =

British magician

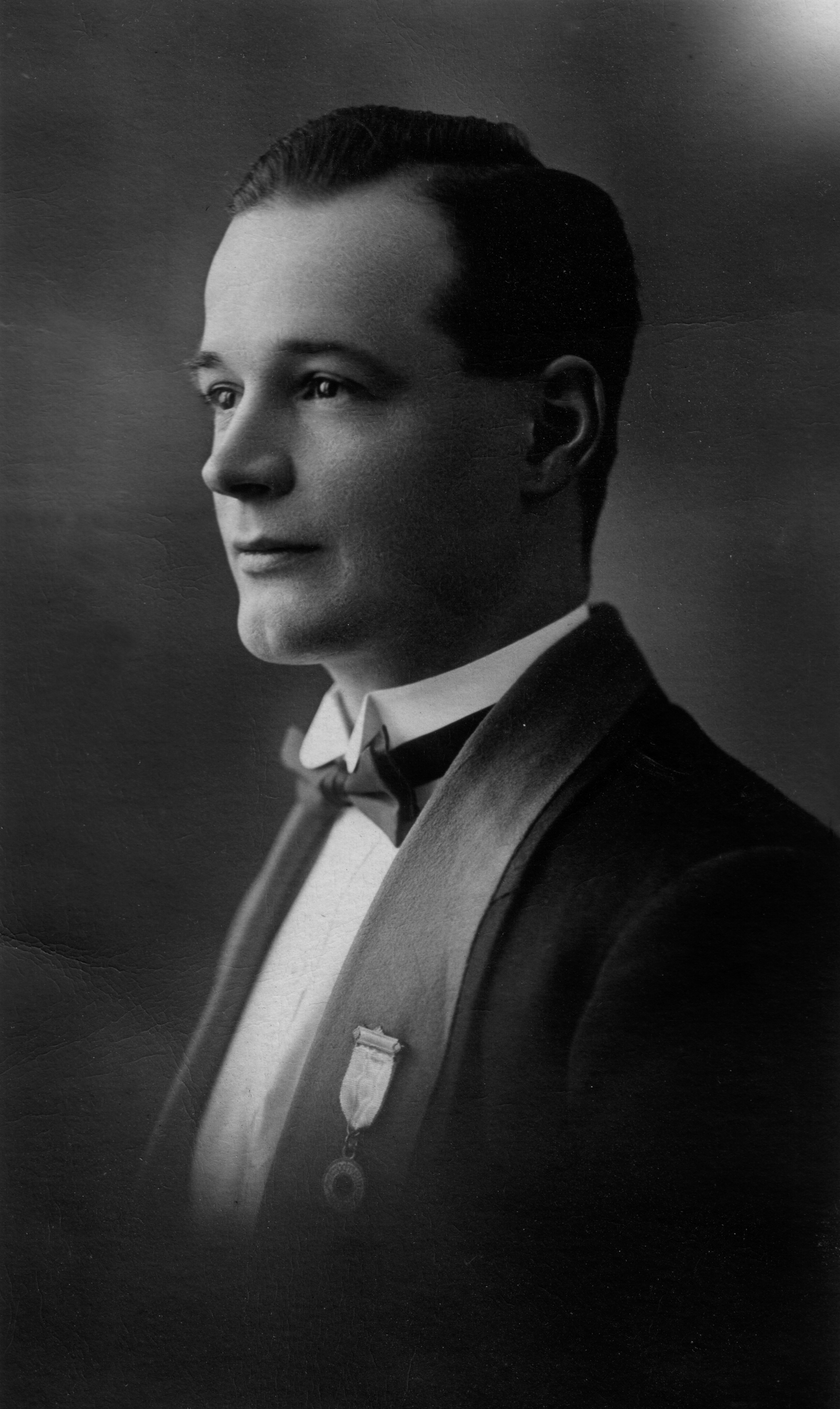
- Val Walker in 1918
- Born: 15 February 1890; England
- Died: 17 March 1969 (aged 79)

Valentine Augustus Walker (15 February 1890 – 17 March 1969) (also known as Val A Walker and Val Enson) was an English magician, escape artist and illusion designer. He was born in Moseley, Birmingham to Joseph Walker, a landscape gardener, and his wife Emma. Val Walker worked as an electrical apparatus maker, later serving in the Royal Navy and was billed as the "Wizard of the Navy". Walker is credited as the designer of the Radium Girl illusion. His most famous escape was "The Tank in the Thames" where he was bolted into a steel tank lowered into the river Thames from the Sea-Scout Training Ship, Northampton on 20 August 1920. He escaped in 20 seconds. He was married in 1913 to Ethel Dora Harris, the daughter of Thomas Daniel Harris and his wife Emma Ellson. He retired from the stage in 1924, returning briefly in 1939, under the name of 'Val Enson', with an illusion called "The Aquamarine Girl".
