= Derek Dingle =

English magician

Derek Dingle (1937–2004) was an English close-up magician.

== Early life ==
Dingle became interested in magic after receiving a box of magic tricks when he was about eight years old. Upon joining the Royal Air Force, he met another magician, James Gregory, of Kenilworth, England, and spent 18 months with him working as wireless operators. They were in Hong Kong for 12 months, where they made up trick packs of cards for magic dealer W. Y. Chu. During this time Dingle borrowed Gregory's collection of magic magazines, such as The IBM Budget and The Linking Ring and his interest in magic grew. They later met Anthony Curle, a sergeant in the RAF, who was also a magician and a member of The Magic Circle. Curle introduced them to many of the Chinese magicians, including Peter Kwok, who became a very close friend.

== Career ==
Dingle spent a year working in magic shops in Hong Kong, where he practiced magic sleights with coins and billiard balls.

After leaving the Royal Air Force and spending a few years in Canada, Dingle moved to New York City, where he became friends with many more magicians, and where his fame grew.

Dingle was known in the magic world for his technical ability. Dingle was very proficient with difficult sleight of hand technique with playing cards and coins. Among fellow magicians, he was well known for his skill in executing the pass.

Dingle's magic was published in several publications and videos. His most popular publication, The Complete Works of Derek Dingle (Richard J. Kaufman, 1982), has been out of print for many years now, but has recently been re-published by Richard Kaufman. His first main release to the magic world was a small book written by Harry Lorayne. Dingle also released several videos which have been now transferred to DVD. These DVDs include Dingle's Deceptions and Dingle's Delights. He was also part of the Stars of Magic series.

== Death ==
Derek Dingle died on January 10, 2004, from a stroke. The May 2004 edition of Genii Magazine featured several articles on Dingle in memoriam of his death.
