= Steve Dacri =

American magician (1952–2011)

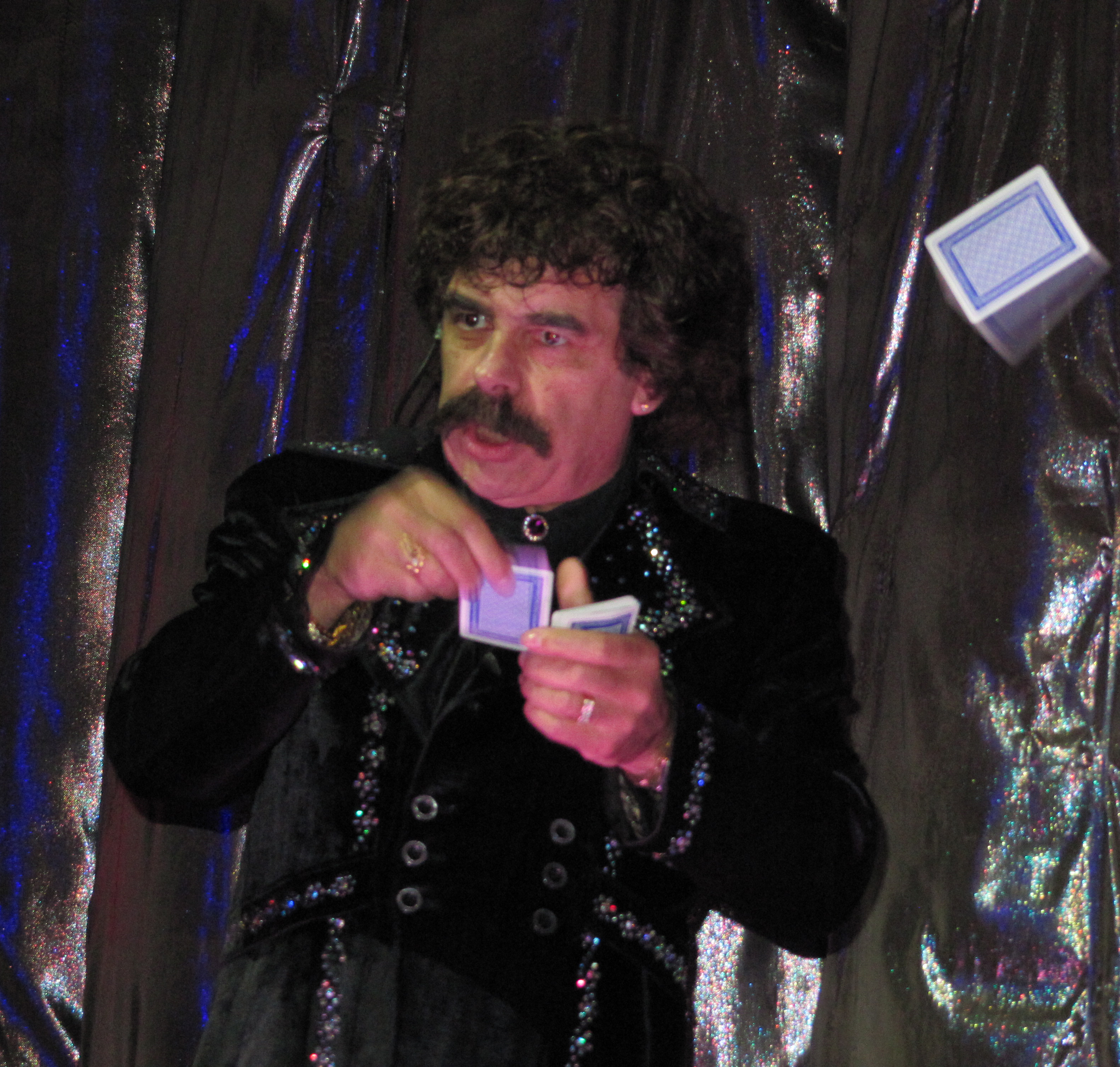
- Dacri performing at the Shimmer Showroom at the Las Vegas Hilton, April 2010
- Born: March 22, 1952; Worcester, Massachusetts, U.S.
- Died: February 11, 2011 (aged 58)
- Spouse: Jan
- Children: 1 son

Stephen "Steve" Robert Dacri (March 22, 1952 – February 11, 2011) was an American sleight-of-hand magician who worked for nearly 30 years at his craft, earning him the moniker "The Fastest Hands in the World."

== Early life ==
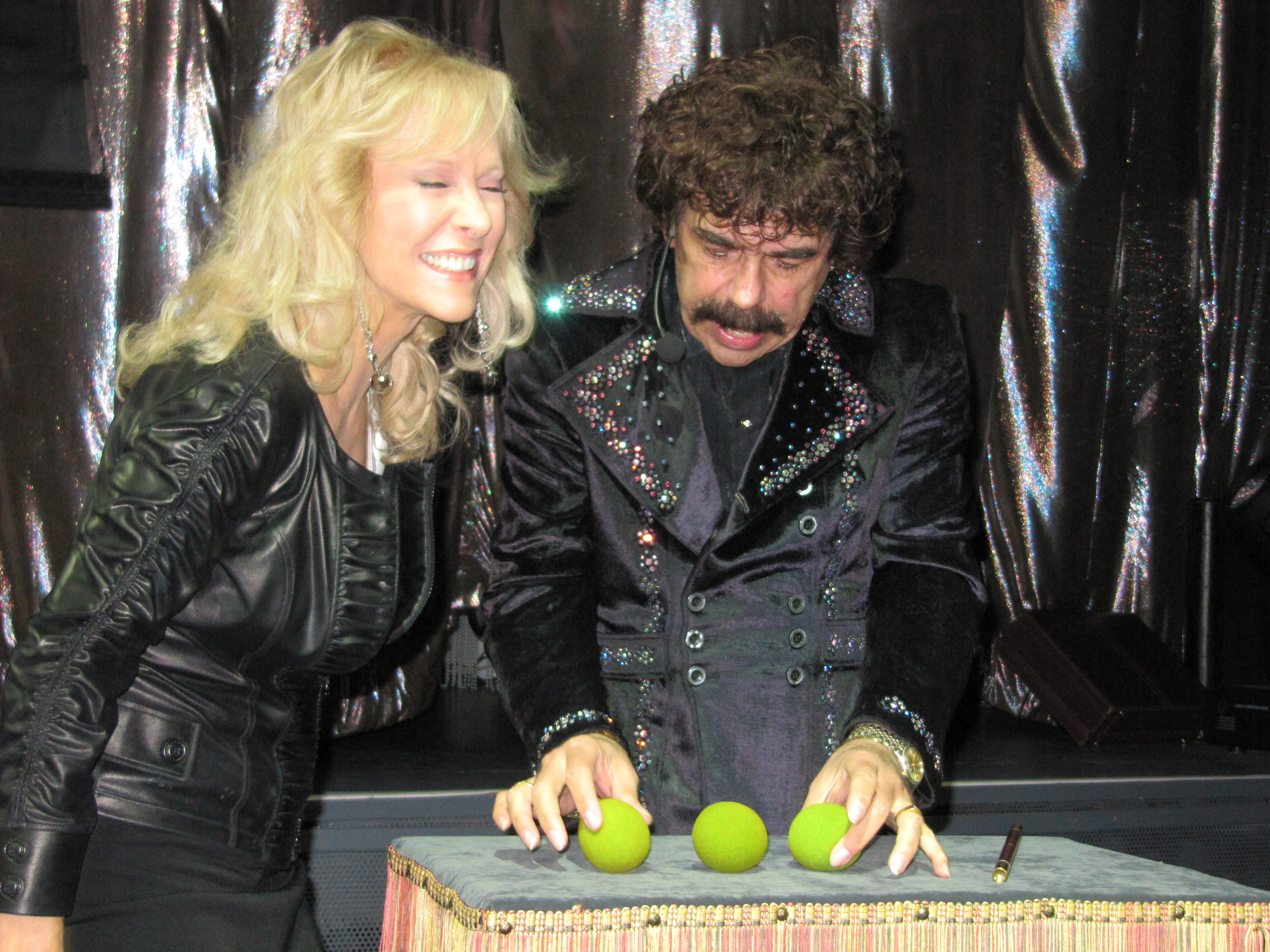
Dacri reveals his "Martians" to an audience member, Las Vegas, 2011

Dacri was born in Worcester, Massachusetts, attended Worcester Polytechnic Institute. His interest in magic began at the age of six when his parents gave him a Mandrake the Magician magic set. Within a few years, he was performing magic at family and community gatherings.

He wrote "I grew up watching Red Skelton, Abbott & Costello, The Three Stooges, The Amazing Ballantine and Jackie Gleason. I always knew I wanted to be able to entertain people like they did".

His joy in entertaining audiences for the majority of his life was clear to everyone who crossed his path. In a blog post dated March 18, 2010, he wrote:

It is obvious to me that most people have never had the chance to see magic in such a setting, performed without props or special sets. To me, this is the real magic, magic that is created in the hands, using age old methods of sleight of hand and misdirection perfected by masters before me. I was lucky to be tutored and coached by the greatest magicians who ever lived, and I owe my success to them. During the show I try to acknowledge them all and we even show a short film clip of the legendary Dai Vernon, whom we called the Professor, as a tribute to the remarkable man who had the distinction of being the only man to fool Houdini. Some nights I even perform the same trick that Vernon used to fool Houdini. To keep things fresh, I am constantly changing things, adding new routines and old ones that I haven't done in many years. I do that for myself as much as for the show. Helps keep me sharp and fresh.

== Television appearances ==
- Candid Camera – 10 appearances
- Dick Cavett
- Good Morning America
- The Merv Griffin Show
- Live With Regis Philbin & Kelly Ripa
- That's Incredible
- The Tonight Show

=== As writer/director ===
- Bounty Hunters
- Emergency Call
- Magic Notebook

== Books ==
- Commercial Close-Up (1978)
- Fooling People (1983)

== DVD set ==
- "Steve Dacri : No Filler", three volume DVD set, L+L Publishing 2007

== Awards ==
- 2008 MERLIN Award (the Oscar of the magic world) for 2008 Best Close-up Magician in the World.
- Member of the Inner Magic Circle with Gold Star
- 2008 and 2009 International Close-Up Magician of the Year
