= Comical Radio =

American talk radio comedy show

Comical Radio, The Danny Lobell Show
- Genre: Talk, comedy, entertainment
- Running time: On terrestrial radio: 2–3 hours per week Streaming online: 2–3 hours per week
- Country of origin: United States
- Home station: WBMB Radio
- Starring: Danny Lobell; Chris Iacono; Myka Fox; David Kasten
- Created by: Danny Lobell
- Original release: 2004 – 2012
- Opening theme: "I Wanna Rock"; By: Twisted Sister
- Website: www.comicalradio.com www.riseoftheradioshow.com/

Comical Radio was an American talk radio comedy show broadcast from New York City. The show airs daily on www.comicalradio.com in New York City. The show is also streamed live online by Cringe Humor Radio, and other Internet comedy outlets. The show is hosted by comedian Danny Lobell, as well as fellow comics Chris Iacono. Comical Radio features comedy segments as well as interviews with established and up-and-coming comedians. The show ended in 2012 as Lobell moved to Los Angeles for comedy gigs.

Each episode of Comical is archived, with segments made available for free on their website and as a podcast on iTunes.

== History ==
The show first broadcast in 2004 under the title Dan & Bob INDA Mornin, hosted by Danny Lobell and his then roommate. His roommate left the show shortly thereafter, and the show became The Danny Lobell Show. The program went through several different co-hosts. Danny Lobell was born and raised in the city of Long Beach, located on the western tip of Long Island. Long Beach has been home for numerous comedians; well known comics such as Omar Martin, Mordy Fenster, and Joey Joseph spent significant time in Long Beach.

Danny Lobell's old friend David Kasten would do a weekly call-in segment known as "The Kasten Minute" early in the show's run. On November 4, 2005, Kasten joined the show as an official co-host. Katy Olson joined the show in early March 2006 as a co-host after a strong guest appearance. Later that year, on June 29, 2006, comedian Chris Iacono joined the show as the fourth co-host. Danny and Katy had instant chemistry, the show soared with the duo leading.

In 2008, comedian Myka Fox replaced Katy Olson as co-host. In 2011, Myka Fox and David Kasten left the show.

In addition to Comical Radio Classic, two shows have been added to the schedule. Too Much Information with Dan and Dan features Dan Naturman, Justy Dodge and Danny Lobell as they entertain guests from entertainment and comedy. Past guests have included Alison Arngrim (Nelly Olson from Little House on the Prairie) and Jim Davis (Garfield). The show involves comedy segments like dial a Madoff, top ten TV theme songs, and prank calls.

Fixing Joe stars comedian Joe Matarese and Danny Lobell. Joe seeks help form his listeners, guest, friends, and family as they try and solve whatever issues he is dealing with that week. As of summer 2011, Joe Matarese ceased his affiliation with Comical Radio and began self-producing Fixing Joe.

== Media appearances ==
Starz TV's "Stand Up or Shut Up!" featured Comical Radio in mid-2006.

Comical was awarded Stage Time's "Best Comedy Radio" of 2007.

The show was referenced in The New York Times Magazine on December 28, 2008. The topic of the article was the late comedian George Carlin, who appeared on the radio show several times, including shortly before his death.

In March 2011, Comical Radio was featured as one of iTunes Top 50 Comedy Podcasts.

== Rise of the Radio Show ==
In May 2009, the cast of Comical Radio began writing and starring in the new web series Rise of the Radio Show. Rise depicts fictional behind-the-scenes events that take place in and around the Comical Radio studios. The ten-episode first season ran throughout the northern summer of 2009. The season featured Brian Haley as a regular cast-member, as well as guest appearances from comedians Patrice O'Neal, JB Smoove, and Dave Attell among others.

== Past guests ==
=== Legendary comedians ===
- George Carlin
- Jackie Mason
- Pat Cooper

=== Modern entertainers ===
- Lewis Black
- Chris Rock
- Actor Paul Giamatti
- Daniel Tosh
- Demetri Martin
- Bill Burr
- Charlie Murphy
- Brian Posehn
- Pablo Francisco
- Dom Irrera
- Ralphie May
- Maria Bamford
- Patrice O'Neal
- David Cross
- Colin Quinn
- Dave Chappelle
- Mark Curry
- Nick DiPaolo
- Bobby Haha
