= Scotch and soda (magic trick) =

Magic effect

Scotch and Soda is a magic effect involving a copper coin and a silver coin which appear to transpose in the spectator's hands. The effect relies on simple gimmick and tricks can be performed with it that are self-working, requiring almost no skill. The trick is named after the cocktail Scotch and soda; the copper coin represents the "Scotch" and the silver coin represents the "soda".

The effect is usually performed as follows: The magician displays two coins of almost equal size, one copper and one silver. The silver coin is most often a U.S. half dollar and the copper coin is usually either an English penny or a Mexican centavo. The magician stacks the coins and places them into the spectator's hand. He then asks her to place her hands behind her back and put one coin in each hand, remarking that the silver coin is slightly larger than the copper coin, making them easy to tell apart. The magician asks to see the silver coin which the spectator produces. When the spectator opens her other hand, the copper coin has become a quarter. The copper coin can then be made to appear wherever the magician desires, such as in the spectator's pocket or under an object across the room.

Scotch and Soda is a popular trick that can be purchased at magic stores. A number of books exclusively on the subject describe different effects that can be achieved with the Scotch and Soda gimmick. Gin and tonic is a version of the trick using a dime and a penny. Another more recent version is Captain & Coke 2.0 as released by the Blue Crown, it uses a US quarter and a US penny.

The modern version that uses a 20 Centavo and a Kennedy half is often attributed to Richard Himber. In the early 1900s, America's oldest magic company, Martinka made a version that utilized a Barber half dollar and a large cent.
