= Zarrow shuffle =

Sleight of hand technique

Zarrow shuffle is a sleight of hand technique that gives the appearance of being a normal riffle shuffle, but in fact leaves the cards in exactly the same order. This is an example of a false shuffle. It was invented by magician Herb Zarrow c. 1940. A Zarrow shuffle works by taking one half of the intermixed cards, and separating them under the cover of the top card.

== See also ==
- Card sharp
