= Thumb tip =

Small storage device used in sleight of hand

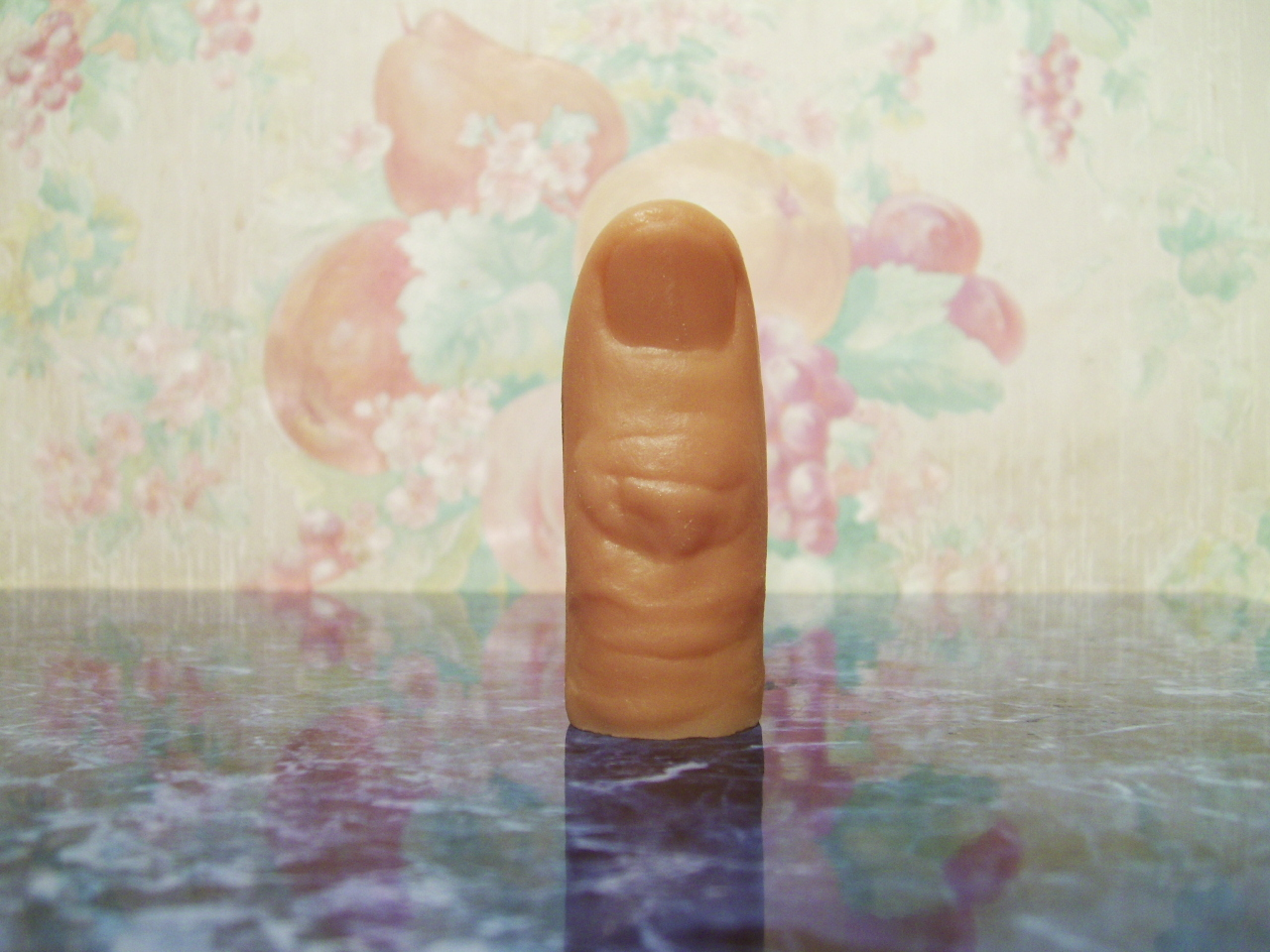
Thumb tip

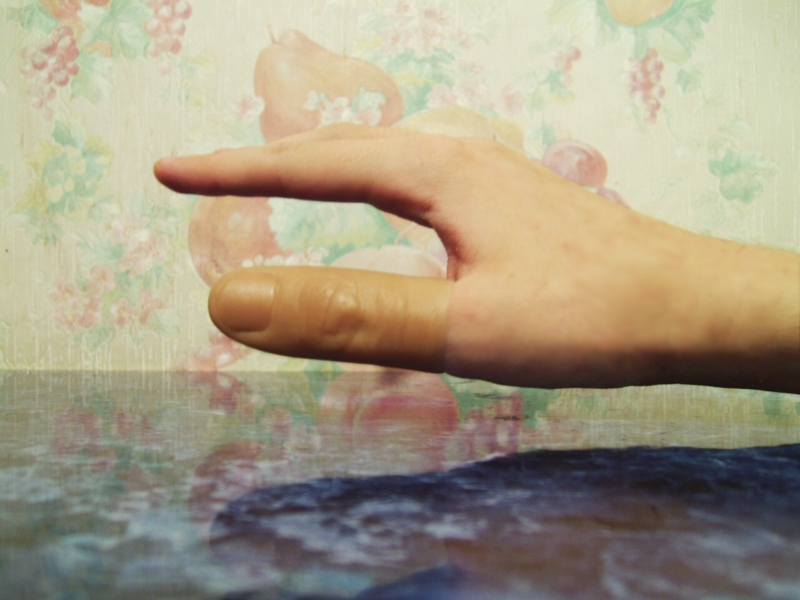
Thumb tip on hand

A thumb tip is a magician's prop that is designed to fit over and appear to be the magician's thumb used for vanishing, producing, or switching small objects. A classic effect is to have a silk handkerchief or other small object pressed into the top of the left fist. After pushing it well in with the right thumb, the left fist is opened to show that the silk has disappeared from view. Alternatively, a lit cigarette, liquid, salt, or other small objects can be made to disappear in a similar manner.

A similar effect is to cause a handkerchief or other small object to appear in the left fist after previously showing it empty. The right hand approaches the left, and after a brief pause, it pulls out the silk handkerchief bit by bit from the fist.

== Explanation ==
These appearances and disappearances are achieved by a small flesh-colored imitation thumb tip, usually made of plastic, rubber, or painted metal, which fits loosely over the thumb. A space exists between the thumb and the tip into which a small object can be concealed.

For the vanish, the tip is already in the left fist. The handkerchief or cigarette is pressed into the tip with the fingers and then finally the right thumb, which comes quickly out of the hand with the tip on and the object inside, between the tip and thumb. While the audience is looking at the fist, the performer has a chance to misdirect and dump the tip and contents in a pocket, perhaps under the cover of putting the hand in the pocket to obtain some "magic dust" to sprinkle on the left fist. Alternatively, the tip may be kept on the thumb for an indeterminate amount of time, using techniques of misdirection and shading to keep it invisible to the audience.

An appearance is achieved in a similar manner, but this time, the tip begins on the right thumb with the object already inside. To avoid detection, the tip may be kept down behind the right hand or it may be pointed directly at the audience while the hand is in motion; done properly, it appears as though the right hand is empty. The left hand is openly shown to be empty and is made into a fist. The right thumb is inserted into the left fist, while simultaneously the thumb and right fingers pull the concealed object out of the tip, which remains in the left fist. While the audience is misdirectedly looking at the object, the performer may turn to his left and dump the tip into his pocket, leaving him clean.

Silk is often used because it will compress into a small space at the tip. Thumb tips and finger tips can be obtained at magic dealers. While the explanation is simple, the use and handling of the tip require quite some skill and practice to perfect. Ultimately, the beauty of the illusion, as with most magic, will depend on the skill of the performer, both in its handling and as an actor.

=== Other types of thumb tips ===
Magicians have used modified thumb tips to accomplish different effects.

A thumb tip with a slit in the tip can be used like a dye tube to apparently change the color of silk. In this case, colored silk is preloaded into the tip. The magician steals the tip from the left fist, then pokes a white silk into the tip while alternately pulling the colored silk out from the other end.

A thumb tip with a small suction cup attached to the tip can be used to create the illusion of floating small objects. In this effect, the tip remains on the magician's thumb while the suction cup is affixed to a small object with a smooth surface (such as a light bulb or empty aluminum can), effectively attaching the object to the thumb. With the fingers spread, the thumb moves the object in such a way that it appears to be floating independently of the hands.

A thumb tip can be prepared with a wick protruding slightly from the end soaked with lighter fluid. This enables the magician to "pick up" a flame, apparently with his or her fingers.

Mentalists may use a thumb tip with a piece of pencil lead at the end which can be used to secretly write on a piece of paper, similar to a swami gimmick.

A thumb tip embedded with magnets can be utilized in performance to cause a magnetic compass to move.

== Publications ==
- 50 Tricks with a Thumb Tip: A Manual of Thumb Tip Magic by Milbourne Christopher (1948)
- Dusheck's Thumb Tip Magic by Steve Dusheck (1991)
- Encyclopedia of Thumb Tip Magic by Gary Darwin, 3-DVD set (2005)
