= Cheating at cards =

Cheating at cards may refer to:

- Cheating in casinos
- Cheating in poker
- A card cheat
