= MindPlay =

MindPlay was a technology designed to monitor blackjack players' actions while playing in a casino, first released in 2003 and discontinued in 2007.

Monitoring a person's play traditionally is done visually, by the dealer, floorperson, pitboss, and the eye in the sky (video surveillance). If one of these observers notices something unusual in a person's play, they will do what they can to either

1. determine if the person is a cheat or a card counter, or
2. change the game to turn the odds back in favor of the casino, through more frequent card-shuffling or other methods, or
3. bar a player they think is a card counter, even though the practice is legal.

== Operation ==
MindPlay utilizes a specially designed blackjack tabletop that incorporates many features to monitor players' actions:

- Specially encoded playing cards, using invisible ink and barcodes; see card marking.
- 14 tiny cameras built into the dealer's chip tray (which is now slightly elevated to account for the cameras). These cameras can read every card in play by reading the invisible ink printed on them.
- Special chips, so that sensors embedded in the table can automatically calculate each player's bet more accurately than a dealer or pitboss could visually.

As MindPlay monitors every card that has been played along with players' betting habits, it is also counting cards just as a card counter would do while sitting at the table. If MindPlay notices that bets are changing dramatically at the same time that a card counter would typically make those bets, MindPlay will notify casino officials that they may want to investigate further.

MindPlay tables cost around 20,000 USD.

== Results ==
Because MindPlay tends to thwart their efforts to beat a blackjack game, card counters generally avoid casinos which use the system and its competitors, and often circulate news of such installations on various Internet sites. Some card counters have tried to make the general public aware of the use of these systems, in an effort to convince others not to patronize the games. Indeed, MindPlay has been somewhat slow to spread among American casinos, partly because of the cost (which must be weighed against that of card-counters) and partly because of negative reaction by players. On the other hand, there were many problems with the systems and some players were able to exploit them.

== Problems and end of support ==
In 2007 Bally Technologies stopped supporting MindPlay. The product was plagued by a host of problems, from the cameras not staying calibrated, to the controller boards malfunctioning. These technical problems along with the need for constant software maintenance by Bally staff contributed to the phasing out of this system.

== See also ==
- Technology for detecting card counters
