= Phule's Company (series) =

Series of comic military science fiction novels by Robert Asprin

Phule's Company is a series of comic military science fiction novels by Robert Asprin (later co-written with Peter J. Heck), beginning with Phule's Company and ending with Phule's Errand.

The series takes place centuries in the future, where humans and other species have come together to form the Interplanetary Alliance, a federation government of numerous planets. The Alliance's military includes not only the Space Legion, but also the Regular Army and Starfleet. The Space Legion is considered the lowest on the totem pole, and the laughingstock of the armed forces. Space Legion protocol has all persons using a pseudonym chosen upon enlistment, and commissions are purchased. It is a violation of Legion rules to release another Legion member's real name, but not to reveal one's own.

After being court-martialed for inadvertently ordering the strafing of a peace conference, Captain Jester is shipped off to command the Omega Company, a dumping ground for the Legion's foul-ups and misfits. Applying his well honed business sense to the running of the unit, he soon turns it around, winning the almost fanatical loyalty of his troops and turning the "Omega Mob", as it is affectionately nicknamed, into a crack unit. In each book, General Blitzkrieg contrives to send the unit on yet another 'impossible' assignment. They usually manage to come through unscathed.

The names of many in the series are based on puns.

== Main characters ==
=== Willard Phule ===
Willard J. Phule is the super-rich heir apparent of Phule-Proof Munitions, currently serving in the Space Legion. His Legion name is Jester, and holds the rank of captain, being addressed thus as Captain Jester, and occasionally and inappropriately as Captain Phule or Captain Clown. Originally having the Legion name was Lieutenant Scaramouche, Phule was brought up on charges and to be court-martialed for ordering the strafing of a peace conference, owing, as he put it, to a “communications error.”

Since Phule-Proof is the Legion's arms and munitions supplier as well as the largest employer of their retirees, Legion Headquarters sees court-martialing the owner’s son as potentially disastrous. He is instead promoted to the rank of Captain and shipped off to Haskin's Planet to command the Omega Company, a dumping ground for the Legion's foul-ups and misfits. It is envisioned that this posting to such an unruly, undesirable outfit might encourage him to resign his commission.

Phule is no fool, and recognizes this promotion's true intent. However, he decides to accept the challenge. Instead of the potentially abysmal assignment it was meant to be he sets out using his business acumen and determination to turn around the unruly “Omega Mob” into a crack military unit, giving the Jester the last laugh.

Phule is a strong-willed individual, with a strong dislike for stereotyping, and not infrequently finds himself in conflict with other authority figures such as his father. Although of a wealthy background, he takes pride that his own fortune is largely self-made: although he started his business empire with a loan from his father, that loan was swiftly repaid. He is also very loyal to his people, going far above what officers would normally do for their soldiers and reacting aggressively to insults towards them. However, Phule can be over-industrious: he has been known to work himself to the point of exhaustion. He is not above using his enormous wealth to buy his way out of a situation, but typically does so only as a last resort. He is also not above using his real name and status to bully or cajole others into doing what he wants. However, regardless of how he wins a personal confrontation, he is always supremely magnanimous in victory and can usually manage to win over the person he's in conflict with. His not inconsiderable talents include finance, group dynamics, military tactics and strategy, leadership, and public relations.

=== Beeker ===
Phule's butler, confidante, and the narrator throughout the series. Though not technically a member of the unit, Beeker is highly respected by most of the company, and often provides its members with sage advice. While he has become quite wealthy in his years of service to Phule, he is still manifestly determined to continue his service to Phule out of companionship and friendship.

=== Top Sergeant Brandy ===
The Company First Sergeant, Brandy is the stereotypical hard-bitten veteran. In Phule's Paradise, Tusk-anini speculates that she is in love with Captain Jester and unaware of the fact. She is one of three female members of Phule's Company who became centerfold models without his knowledge. Although a physical description is not given in the stories beyond the fact that she is a very big woman, but not fat, you get the impression that she is Amazonian: in early middle age, over 6 feet tall, and thoroughly three-dimensional. She is also an old hand at brawling. In one scene she got in a scuffle with Tusk-anini, a 7-foot-tall (2.1 m) alien (see below) and after he knocked her down with the first punch, she put him in the hospital with a concussion.

=== Lt Rembrandt ===
The senior of Phule's two junior officers, Rembrandt is also an aspiring artist. Beeker notes that before meeting Phule she specialised in landscapes, but after he took over the company she expressed an interest in painting a nude portrait of him. Rembrant, or "Remmie", initially lacks confidence and is content to let the NCO's run the company. Phule's major concern with her is teaching her to develop the habit of command, to trust her judgement, and to learn to exercise her authority. When circumstances put her in command of the Omega Mob in Phule's Paradise, she performs decisively, including standing up to Colonel Battleaxe, Phule's immediate superior, when the situation required her to do so. Although Battleaxe recommended her for a command of her own, like Lt. Armstrong she is content to remain as one of Phule's subordinates.

=== Lt Armstrong ===
The son of a heroic but dead military officer, Armstrong is initially an uptight caricature of the career Regular Army officer. A rant he delivers while drunk reveals he resents living in the shadow of his father, whom he feels he can never live up to because of the man's legendary status. Once Phule takes him under his wing, he begins to loosen up and learns to mix his military bearing along with compassion. At first, Armstrong is jealous of and contemptuous of Lt. Rembrandt, and takes any given opportunity to show her up. He soon learns to see her strengths, however, and the two form an excellent working relationship, helping each other out whenever they can. Like Lt. Rembrandt, he turned down promotion and a command of his own to stay with Captain Jester and the Omega Company.

=== Tusk-anini ===
Tusk-anini (or Tusk) is a Volton, a race with warthog-like features. His species is large and imposing, but pacifistic by nature. Captain Jester paired him with Super Gnat, and this pairing, like most of the other Omega Company partnerships, benefited both partners greatly. He doesn't like to fight but will if necessary, especially to protect his partner (often from her own temper). Tusk does not often take the bit in his teeth, but when he does it is best to step out of his way or do what he is asking you to do. He is the Legionnaire most loyal to Phule. He is also quite intelligent, and since he only sleeps a few minutes a day he spends his wealth of free time reading a daunting variety of human books to better learn the language and culture. He prides himself on not needing a translation device to communicate. Phule promotes him to corporal and makes him the company clerk. Tusk-anini plans to be a teacher after his enlistment is over.

=== Super Gnat ===
The shortest Legionnaire in the unit, the diminutive Super-Gnat has the hottest temper. In the first book, she often exploded at the mere use of the word "short", even if it did not concern her. Her partnership with Tusk-anini calms her, and while she still has a fiery temper, she learned to control it once she found that Tusk-anini was fighting people who made fun of her, to keep her from getting hurt trying to fight them. It is revealed that she was married to a martial arts instructor, and is a black belt in multiple disciplines. However, when she loses her temper she usually is unable to call upon these skills, and loses most of her impulsive fights. Super-Gnat has taken fencing lessons from Phule and is one of the three female members of Phule's Company who became centerfold models without his knowledge.

=== Sushi ===
The product of a wealthy family, Sushi was acquainted with Phule socially before they separately joined the Space Legion. In Sushi's case this decision was made after he lost a fortune he had embezzled to gambling debts. Sushi eventually initiates a one-man takeover of the Yakuza, the Japanese mafia.

=== Do-Wop ===
Do-Wop is something of a kleptomaniac, and Phule's reason for pairing him with Sushi was similar to the reasons he paired up other members of the unit: to balance each other. In this case, he hoped that Do-Wop would teach Sushi to learn to have fun and relax; and that Sushi could teach Do-Wop to aim a little higher than petty thievery. Unfortunately, their pairing succeeded entirely too well. Now, instead of a petty-grade kleptomaniac and a cold, calculating risktaker that usually held back, Do-Wop and Sushi are Omega Company's greatest masters of larceny. As they also are good planners, they are a force to be reckoned with when the Captain turns them loose on a problem.

=== Rose/Mother ===
A female Legionnaire, the only original member of Omega Company without a partner. She is terrified of other people and is only capable of mumbling incoherently when addressed directly, except when the speaker is a woman. She is highly skilled as the Company's communications coordinator; in Phule's Paradise Tully Bascomb, a legendary casino security chief, suggests she look him up if she ever decides to leave the Legion, to teach "eye in the sky" security monitoring. The lack of face-to-face contact is the defining factor of Mother's shyness; when not dealing with people in person, she can be something of a smart-ass until the chips are down. She is one of the three female members of Phule's Company who became centerfold models without his knowledge — to his surprise, it was her idea.

=== Escrima ===
Named after the Filipino form of martial arts, Sergeant Escrima is the company's mess sergeant. Hot-tempered, he is a talented chef; he dislikes insults towards his own food or food in general. He is a master in all forms of Philippine martial arts: hand-to-hand combat, knife fighting and especially arnis, Philippine stick fighting. He represented the Omega Mob in a competition against an elite Regular Army unit with the Olympic light saber in Phule's Company and almost defeated him, despite never having fenced before.

=== Chocolate Harry ===
Also known as C.H. The company supply sergeant, Harry has a talent for black-marketeering. He is a former member of the Outlaws, a criminal hover-bike club and still maintains his personal bike. One of his trademarks is wearing sleeveless uniforms. He is partners with Louis, one of the Legion's two Sinthians, who rides in a side-car on Harry's bike, wielding a shotgun. Initially, C.H. doesn't think much of Phule and plans to take advantage of him, but soon learns that Phule is far too intelligent for this and can in fact teach him to play in the big leagues if he toes the line and operates within the parameters Phule gives him.

=== General Blitzkrieg ===
A senior officer and one of the three Directors of the Space Legion, Blitzkrieg has a personal dislike of Phule and would very much like to force him out of the Legion, after which he intends to retire from the Space Legion and sell his memoirs. His preferred method is to assign the toughest of assignments to the Omega Company ... a strategy that has thus far failed to do anything more than cement the reputation of Phule's Company as an elite body of troops. He also has been known to attempt to throw a monkey wrench into the smooth operation of the Omega Mob by complying with the letter of the regulations. One example of this is Blitzkrieg's responding to Phule's request that a chaplain be assigned to his company by sending him a chaplain from The Church of The King — whose saviour is a Twentieth Century musician.

=== Colonel Battleaxe ===
The officer who originally assigned Phule to the Omega Company and his immediate superior, Battleaxe fully expected that the tough duty would lead to his resignation. She was surprised but pleased when he instead turned them around and has since become his staunchest defender in the Space Legion, to the point of breaking off her first vacation in years to cross the galaxy and assist him against one of Blitzkrieg's schemes. She is aware that, should Phule be drummed out of the Legion, the resulting backlash from Phule-Proof Munitions (to which Phule is heir) would be disastrous to the Space Legion. She has recommended both Rembrandt and Armstrong for commands of their own.

=== Flight Leftenant Qual ===
The company's Zenobian contact. Though not a member of the unit, he is nevertheless indebted to Phule, whom he met during the first book, with pulling him out of disrepute due to his mistaking a ceremonial vase for a waste receptacle at a prominent reception. This incident led to his placement on an exploration team which crash landed upon the swamp planet, Haskins, whereupon their outfit was discovered and fired upon by Do-Wop of the Omega Company out of ignorance. His species resemble miniature allosaurs. Due to a malfunction of his universal translator, Qual habitually refers to Willard Phule, aka Captain Jester, as "Captain Clown."

=== Rev ===
When Captain Jester requested a chaplain for the Omega Company, General Blitzkrieg sent him the Reverend Jordan Ayres, of the Church of The King. He is somewhat pudgy with black, slicked back hair and an all too easily recognized face.

== Planets in the series ==
- Haskin's Planet – swampy planet that exports gems
- Landoor – former mining planet
- Zenobia – homeworld of the Zenobian Empire
- Cut 'N' Shoot – old west-style tourist planet
- Rot'n'art – tourist planet
- Hix's World – tourist planet
- Old Earth – tourist planet

== Books in the series (in chronological order) ==
- Phule's Company (1990)
- Phule's Paradise (1992)
- A Phule and His Money (1999) with Peter J. Heck
- Phule Me Twice (2000) with Peter J. Heck
- No Phule Like an Old Phule (2004) with Peter J. Heck
- Phule's Errand (2006) with Peter J. Heck
