= Muck (gambling) =

Discarding of cards in card games

Mucking is the discarding of cards in card games. Depending on the game, it may be a regular part of play or it may be considered cheating.

== Poker ==
In poker, it most often refers to the discard pile into which players may throw their folded hands, and into which the dealer places burned cards. It also refers to when a player is folding his hand (face down) without saying anything. In fact, the hand is not folded until it reaches the muck (it can be taken back and used if the dealer did not take the hand yet). The practice of mucking cards when discarding helps to ensure that no other player can reliably determine which cards were in the folded hand.

In poker, the term may also refer to the action that a player who has not folded may take; he can have his hand "mucked" if another player attempts to discard but one or more cards end up in the live players hand. This is why many players will place a chip or other object on their cards: it helps to prevent errant cards from entering their hand. Sometimes they are referred to as card covers, card guards or card protector.

=== Mucking as a strategy ===
In some variations of poker a player may "muck" their cards in order to reinforce a bluff while preserving their image on the table.

== Other card games ==
Mucking or hand mucking may also refer to a form of sleight of hand, and, if used in a card game, is cheating. A player conceals a card through sleight of hand, removing it from play so that it may later be inserted back into the game to the cheater's advantage. For example, in blackjack a cheating player might remove an ace from the table to use the next time he is dealt a ten to make a blackjack.

In a court case decided in 1984, a blackjack player using this technique in a Nevada casino was convicted of altering the outcome of a gambling game.

A player used mucking in the game of baccarat to steal millions from a casino in Asia.
