= Bottom dealing =

Sleight of hand card dealing technique

Bottom dealing or base dealing is a sleight of hand technique in which the bottom card from a deck of playing cards is dealt instead of the top card. It is used by magicians as a type of card illusion, and by card sharps and mechanics, and as a method of cheating in poker or other card games. The first reference of this move was published in 1553 by Baldassarre Castiglione. The first published guide to the bottom deal was published in 1902 by S. W. Erdnase.

There are several grips that can be used for bottom dealing, for example: A mechanic's grip, Erdnase Grip, Straddle Grip and Marlo Master Grip. There are two ways to bottom deal: Strike and Push-Off. In the push-off bottom deal, the dealer slides the top card partially off the deck as if to deal it, while under the cover of the top card, pushes the bottom card slightly out, which is then taken by the dominant hand. During a strike bottom deal, instead of the card being pushed out, the dominant hand just touches the bottom card and forces it out. The card is snapped away from the deck while the top card is reset.

The bottom deal is easier to do when the deck is smaller in size, meaning that it has less than 52 cards. Thus, a cheater trying to better hide the bottom deal might do it with only a partial deck.

Unless the dealer is particularly skilled at bottom dealing, the technique produces a slightly different sound from standard dealing. Due to a lack of skill, the card being dealt, or the one second from the bottom, might get stuck, sticking out of the deck. This is called a "hanger". Other issues that a bottom dealer that lacks skill might encounter are finger flutter and knuckle flashing. Knuckle flashing happens when, during a push-off bottom deal, the knuckles of the non-dominant hand show from beneath the deck, due to having moved to buckle the bottom card in order to push it out. Finger flutter is the motion of straightening out and tilting the fingers of the non-dominant hand downward in order to let the bottom card escape from the deck.

A common way to prevent bottom dealing is to use a cut card. A cut card is either a plastic card, or a face-up card, usually a joker, placed on the bottom of the deck. The logic behind the decision is that if a bottom dealer where to attempt a bottom deal, they would instead deal the cut card. This security measure can be bypassed by a Greek Deal.

Bottom dealing and second dealing both have application in performance magic.

Bottom dealing experts include Persi Diaconis, Dai Vernon, Ed Marlo, Darwin Ortiz, Steve Forte, Jason Ladanye, Daniel Madison, Jason England and Richard Turner.

== See also ==
- Card manipulation
- Cheating in poker
- Second dealing
- Card marking
