= Punctuating (disambiguation) =

Punctuating may refer to

- Punctuation, in written language
- A method of cheating in poker with marked cards
- Punctuated equilibrium
