= Phule's Paradise =

1992 novel by Robert Asprin

- Cover of the 1992 first-edition paperback
- Author: Robert Asprin
- Cover artist: Robert Grace
- Language: English
- Series: Phule's Company
- Genre: Science fiction
- Publisher: Ace Books
- Publication date: February 1992
- Publication place: United States
- Media type: Print (paperback)
- Pages: 256pp (first edition)
- ISBN: 0-441-66253-6
- Preceded by: Phule's Company
- Followed by: A Phule and His Money

Phule's Paradise is the second novel of the comic military science fiction Phule's Company series by Robert Asprin. The book, first published by Ace Books in February 1992, follows Willard J. Phule and his misfit company as they defend a casino on a space station against the local organized crime baron. The book reached the New York Times Best Seller list in 1992.

== Plot ==
The book begins when Phule and his "Omega Mob" receive orders to report to the space station Lorelei, a resort space station home of many casinos. The "Omega Mob" is contracted to defend the Fat Chance Casino from take over by organized crime. Phule splits 50 of the troops from the company, giving them permission to operate under cover in order to gain intelligence on the crime syndicate. He supplements the lost legionnaires with actors and trains the whole unit, actors and legionnaires, in casino security. Upon their arrival they learn that the crime boss, Maxine, has partial ownership in the casino and plans to bankrupt the casino in order to gain a controlling interest. With this intelligence, Phule is able to thwart all of the schemes developed by Maxine thanks to his prior knowledge.

In retaliation, Maxine's thugs attack two of the actors. However, upon noticing the thug's leader's possession of the company's distinctive wrist communicators, Chocolate Harry, the company's supply sergeant, retrieves the communicators and beats up the leader. Frustrated with all the failed actions, Maxine resorts to her backup plan: kidnap Phule and ransom him. The resourceful Omega Mob foils the kidnapping, rescuing Phule and forcing Maxine to hand over her share of the casino to the company.
