= Cheating in casinos =

Actions by the player prohibited by regional gambling control authorities

Cheating in casinos refers to actions by the player or the house which are prohibited by regional gambling control authorities. This may involve using suspect apparatus, interfering with apparatus, chip fraud or misrepresenting games. The formally prescribed sanctions for cheating depend on the circumstances and gravity of the cheating and the jurisdiction in which the casino operates. In Nevada, for a player to cheat in a casino is a felony under state law. In most other jurisdictions, specific statutes do not exist, and alleged instances of cheating are resolved by the gambling authority who may have more or less authority to enforce its verdict.

Advantage play techniques are not cheating. Card counting, for example, is a legitimate advantage play strategy that can be employed in blackjack and other card games. In almost all jurisdictions, casinos are permitted to ban from their premises customers they believe are using advantage play, regardless of whether they are in fact doing so and even though it is not cheating, though this practice of barring law-abiding citizens from public places is subject to judicial review. So far, courts in New Jersey and North Las Vegas, Nevada have found the practice of barring law-abiding citizens to be illegal.

== Methods of cheating by players ==
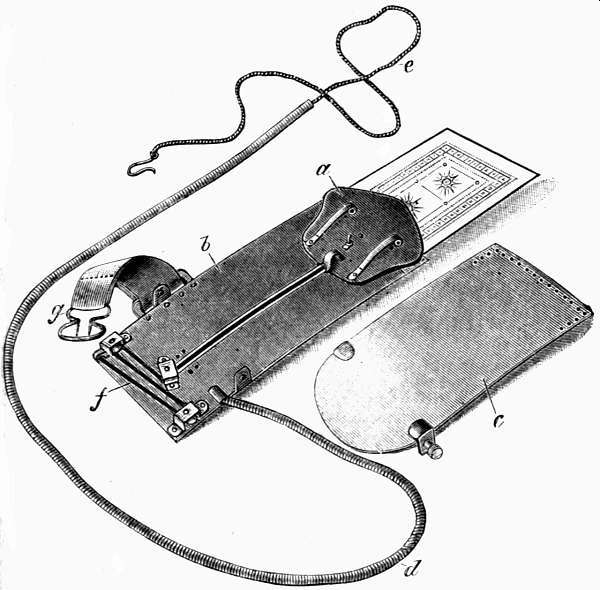
Kepplinger holdout machine

The methods for cheating in a casino are often specific to individual games and include the following:

- Past posting: After a bet is won, a player replaces smaller-denomination chips with large-denomination chips.
- Hand mucking: Palming desirable cards, then switching them for less desirable cards that the gambler holds.
- Using a "holdout" device to remove a card from the game until needed at a later time.
- Card marking: Various methods exist to mark cards during play.
- Marked decks: Usually involving the collusion of casino employees, it may be possible for a marked deck to be introduced into play. There are many different ways to mark decks of cards, some of them very difficult to detect. Casinos often replace their cards at table games and either sell or give away the used decks. These decks are usually cut or altered before they are sold or given away. This is to prevent cheaters from buying used decks and then using the cards to cheat at table games.
- Tampering with slot machines: Methods exist for altering the outcome of slot machine games.
- Collusion: In poker games, the practice of two partners signaling to each other the values of their cards can be very difficult to detect. Also, in table games, players can collude with the dealer.
- Using auxiliary devices: In Nevada, New Jersey, and other jurisdictions, using any device which helps to forecast the odds or aid in a legitimate strategy such as card counting is regarded as cheating.
- Top hats: In roulette, players place a bet after the ball has landed. The chips are disguised using a third party's chip –the "top hat".
- Using a computer to gain an edge, illegal in Nevada since 1985.
- Exploiting bugs in online casino software: In one example from 1999, security researchers from Cigital found that the online poker software used by Planet Poker and other sites did not shuffle cards adequately. The worst of the flaws they discovered was that the pseudorandom number generator used in the shuffling algorithm was seeded solely using the value of the system clock; a cheater knowing the server time to within one or two minutes (allowing for only around 200,000 possible shuffles under the flawed algorithm) could identify the order of all cards in the deck after seeing just five of them (the cheater's two hole cards and the flop in Texas hold 'em).

== Methods of cheating by casinos ==
- Using a rigged roulette wheel.
- False deals: A dealer may be able to deal the second card from the top (used in conjunction with marked cards), or the ability to deal the bottom card of the deck (used in conjunction with placing desirable cards at the bottom of the deck), see for example Mechanic's grip.
- False shuffles and cuts: A dealer may seem to mix or cut the cards, while retaining certain cards or the whole deck in a desired order.
- Using a deck of cards with non-standard composition.
- Using a cold deck.
- Using loaded dice.
- Using rulesets not sanctioned by a gambling control authority.
- Using slot machines which pay lower than the statutory minimum.
- False advertising by not paying advertised promotions.
- Mail fraud or sending a mail offer but not honoring the offer once the customer is at the casino, also called bait and switch.
- Rigged video poker machines, such as the Vegas "American Coin Scandal"
- Rigged drawings, such as at The Venetian, Las Vegas.
- Corrupt regulators, such as Ronald Dale Harris.
- Using a computer to gain an edge over the players.

== Prevention of cheating ==
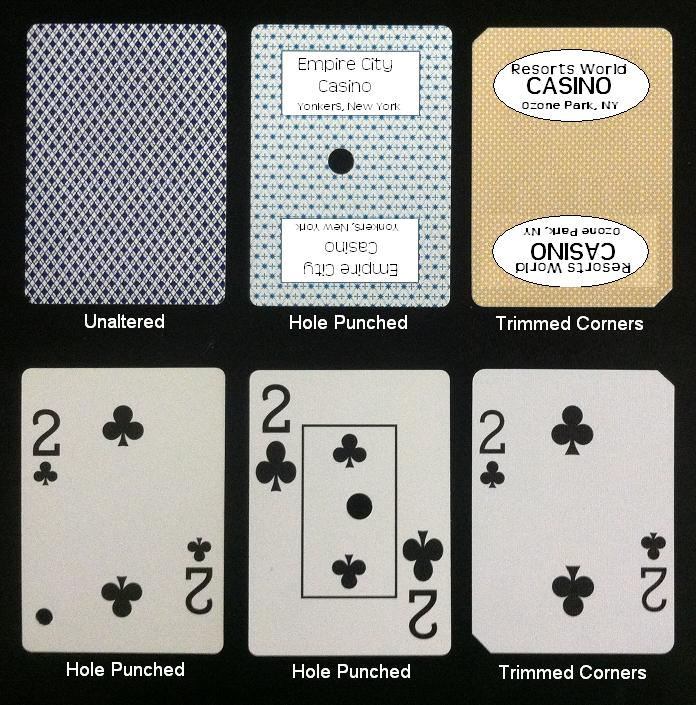
Cards used at table games are altered by the casinos to prevent them from being used to cheat at table games.

Cheating can be reduced by employing "proper procedure" - certain standardized ways of shuffling cards, dealing cards, storing, retrieving and opening new decks of cards.

Most casinos are obliged to have an extensive array of security cameras and recorders which monitor and record all the action in a casino, which can be used to resolve some disputes. Some casinos use facial recognition software to detect known cheats and criminals.

== See also ==
- Cheating in baseball
- Cheating in chess
- Cheating in poker
- Casino security
