= Holdout =

Holdout or Hold Out may refer to:

== Sports ==
- Holdout (sports), a player's refusal to report to their team or failure to perform the services outlined in the terms of their contract

== Media ==
- "Hold Out" (Tom Robinson song), a 1979 song by the Tom Robinson Band on the album TRB Two
- Hold Out, a 1980 album by Jackson Browne
- "Hold Out" (Matthew Saunoa song), a 2006 song by Matthew Saunoa
- "Hold Out" (Sam Fender song), 2020

== Real estate ==
- Holdout (architecture), a property that did not become part of a larger development
- A holdout (seller) in real estate transactions, who refuses to negotiate with buyers who have a bid that is lower than the initial asking price

== Other ==
- Holdout (gambling), a device used to cheat in gambling
- Holdout problem, in finance concerning bond redemption
- Holdout weapon, a weapon, typically a pistol, which can be sneaked into areas where weapons are normally confiscated or prohibited
- Japanese holdout, a World War II soldier in the Pacific who continued to fight after Japan surrendered
- Holdout data set, in statistics and machine learning, data that has not been used to derive a model
