= Cheating in poker =

Overview of poker cheating

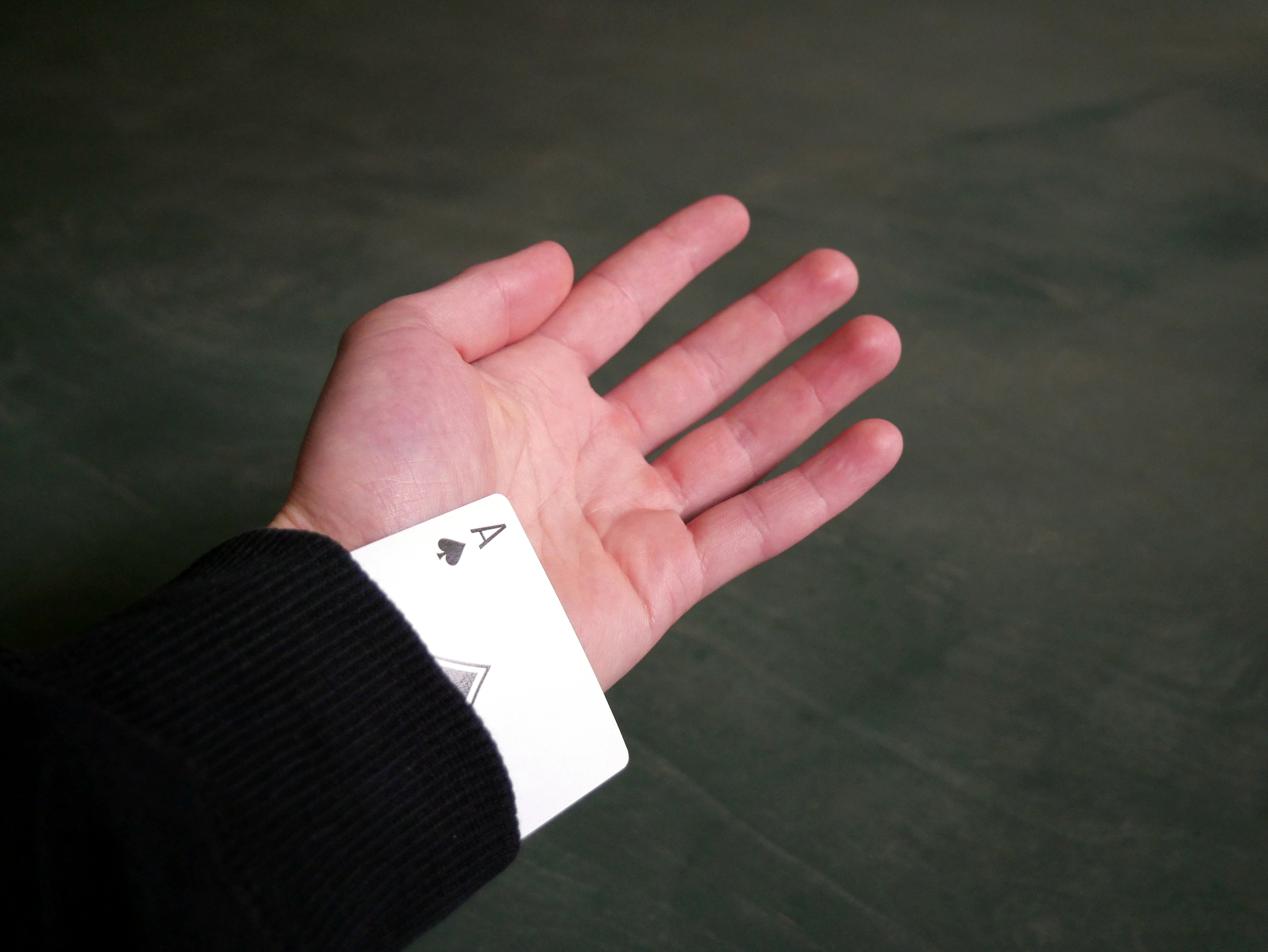
A card hidden under a sleeve

Cheating in poker is any behavior outside the rules of poker that is intended to give an unfair advantage to one or more players.

== Minimal-skill methods ==
The easiest and most common types of cheating require no skill of manipulation, but rather merely the nerve. Such methods include shorting the pot, avoiding house fees, and peeking at other players' cards. It is very difficult to prove because when confronted, at least the first time, the cheat often calls the cheating an honest mistake.

One minimal-skill method that occurs in non-casino and casino games happens when a player who has folded appoints themselves the tender of the pot, stacking chips, counting them, and delivering them to the winning player. Check-chopping is when such a "helpful" player palms a chip. Odorless adhesive can be used for this purpose.

Another minimal-skill method is going south (also known as "ratholing"), where a player covertly removes a portion of their chips from play while remaining in the game, normally in order to preserve the winnings as profit, or prevent a major loss in "big bet" games.

== Skilled methods ==
A cheat may hand-muck or palm one or more cards. When a cheat is "mucking" the cheat is cleverly hiding cards in their hand, to later switch their hand for. This may also be done with a confederate.

A skilled cheat can deal the second card, the bottom card, the second from bottom card, and the middle card. The idea is to cull, or to find the cards one needs, place them at the bottom, top, or any other place the cheat wants, then false deal them to oneself or one's confederate.

One sign of false dealing could be when a dealer grips the deck with the index finger in front of it or their pinky and pointing finger on both short sides of the deck while the other fingers support the deck while the cards are being beveled slightly. This is referred to as the "Mechanic's grip". It not only allows better control of the cards, but provides cover by showing the back of the top card, and without moving the hand holding the deck.

A cheat can place certain cards in a position favorable to the card cheat. This is called "stacking". Stacking is more often done than "false dealing" because it doesn't look suspicious. There are a couple of techniques for "stacking" cards, the best known being riffle stacking and overhand stacking. In riffle stacking the cheat stacks the card(s) while doing a riffle shuffle. This form of stacking is the most difficult to master and the most respected under the card sharps and magicians. The overhand stacking method takes little practice, and is more likely to be done in a situation with a cheat. The cheat does (what looks like) a normal overhand shuffle. But while the cheat is shuffling they keep track of the cards they want to stack, and with a little practice they can manage to put the exact number of cards in between the cards they want to stack to make the next round of dealing favorable for the cheat.

Even if a cheat deals themselves a powerful hand, they may not win much money if every other player has nothing, so often the cheat will stack two hands, with one player receiving a strong hand and the cheater getting an even stronger one. This is called a "double duke".

A slight advantage for a cheat can be to know what cards are placed both on the top of the deck as well as the bottom card, so that information can then later be used to bottom deal or second deal themselves that card. The looking at the top or bottom card without the other players knowing or seeing it is called "Glimpsing" or "Peeking". There are a lot of methods for reaching the same goal. A method that is used most is called the "Shiner". A Shiner is a reflective object (such as coffee, a lighter, a blade etc.) that is placed under the deck, so when the cheat is looking into the shiner the bottom card is exposed, and every card that is dealt over the shiner can easily be peeked by looking in the shiner.

One method of cheating that involves both great risk and great potential pay-off is the cold deck—so called because it has not been "warmed up" by play (and thus randomised). Such decks are usually pre-stacked, and are introduced either at the deal, after the real deck has been shuffled, or before the deal, where a card sharp will make a false shuffle using sleight of hand. The latter method may require collusion or a pass if the style of play or house rules call for a cut. The skill lies both in convincing other players that the shuffle is legitimate and in ensuring that other players receive hands that are good enough to entice them into play, but not too good to arouse suspicion.

=== Marked cards ===
Marked cards are printed or altered so that the cheater can know the value of specific cards while only looking at the back. Ways of marking are too numerous to mention, but there are certain broad types. A common way of marking cards involves marks on a round design on the card so as to be read like a clock (an ace is marked at one o'clock, and so on until the king, which is not marked). Shading a card by putting it in the sun or scratching the surface with a razor are ways to mark an already printed deck.

Juice and "daub" are two kinds of substances that can be used to mark cards in a subtle way so as to avoid detection, when done properly. While a "juice" deck is premarked and introduced into play by the cheater, "daub" is applied during play to any deck. Once trained, cheaters can read the cards from across the table.

Decks can be marked while playing using fingernails, poker chips or by bending or crimping the cards in a position that the cheat can read from across the table. The practice of burning the top card, or cards, is to prevent a cheat from knowing that top card and dealing "seconds" to either give a confederate a card that helps their hand or an opponent a card that hurts theirs.

== Collusion ==
Collusion is two or more players acting with a secret, common strategy. Some common forms of collusion are: soft play, that is, failing to bet or raise in a situation that would normally merit it, to avoid costing one's partner or friend money; whipsawing, where partners raise and re-raise each other to trap players in between; dumping, where a cheater will deliberately lose to a partner; and signalling, or trading information between partners via signals of some sort, like arranging their chips in a certain manner.

In a poker tournament, when one player is all in and two or more other players are active in the pot, it is common for the players with chips left to "check it down", or check on each round of betting through the end of the hand. Unless they explicitly communicate an agreement about checking it down, this is not collusion in most circumstances.

== Online specific ==
Online play has allowed for new methods of cheating while other methods based on physical objects such as cards or chips are impossible.

One new form of cheating is the use of bots. These are programs that play instead of a real human. Though their accuracy and their ability to win are disputed, their use normally violates the rules of online cardrooms, so using them is, by definition, cheating.

Collusion in online poker is relatively easy and much more difficult to immediately spot if executed well. Cheaters can engage in telephone calls or instant messaging, discussing their cards, since nobody can see them. Sometimes one person may be using two or more computers to play multiple hands at the same table under different aliases (since many broadband plans offer customers multiple IP addresses, this can conveniently and cheaply be done without the likelihood of immediate detection). Such tactics can give cheaters an advantage that is difficult to work against. Online poker cardrooms keep records of every hand played, and collusion can often be detected by finding any of several detectable patterns (such as folding good hands to a small bet, as it is known that another player has a better hand). Users who frequently sit at the same tables will be flagged by poker rooms and their play will be closely monitored. Often, such users will be warned they have been flagged, in an effort to deter collusion.

Another online method of cheating is "multiaccounting", where a player will register several accounts to their name (or, perhaps more commonly, to non-poker-playing friends and family members). This might be done to help enable the collusion previously mentioned, or perhaps to simply enable a well-known player to play incognito. Another common motive for multi-accounting is to facilitate chip dumping and other methods of equity maximization in online tournaments. A major difference between cash games and tournaments is that tournament winnings tend to be much less consistent over the short to medium term. Because tournaments tend to pay prize money only to the top ten percent of entrants on average and tend to pay the majority of prize money to a very small number of top finishers, in tournament play even the best players are prone to relatively long streaks of overall net losses (or even no winnings at all) between sizable wins. Therefore, for high-stakes players who specialize in tournament play, multi-accounting is one possible means to allow a player to play more entries in major tournaments than they would otherwise be able to, potentially multiplying the player's earnings and, just as importantly, making earnings more consistent over a shorter period of time. This risks a large win by a hitherto unknown "player" attracting scrutiny from the host (and other players), especially if the winner has no known previous poker experience but does have clear ties to a better-known player. In addition, some sites now offer multi-table tournaments where the same player can enter multiple times under their own name, so as to reduce the incentive to multi-account.

Another concern is datamining. This is the systematic collection of hand histories, enough of which can be used to profile opponents using specially designed software. Two or more players may agree to share their individual hand histories amongst themselves; alternatively some websites offer large quantities of previously-played hands (even millions) for a fee. Using software to analyze one's own histories is generally accepted. Acquiring histories of hands in which a player did not participate violates the rules of most cardrooms.

Poker software, like all software, cannot be assumed to be reliable. It is always possible that a person is exploiting the software to win money from victims. The software may even contain a backdoor which allows a person, perhaps an employee, to view cards. Absolute Poker was engaged in such a scandal along with site consultant and notable poker player Russ Hamilton. As of 2007, Ultimate Bet faces a lawsuit with allegations of employees exploiting the software. The user agreement of the two online poker sites owned by Tokwiro Enterprises, Absolute Poker and UltimateBet, state they reserve the right to cancel an account if a player plays "in a professional sense" (and not for personal entertainment only). This is not a standard prohibition. For example, it is not in the end-user agreements of the three largest online cardrooms: PokerStars, PartyPoker, and Full Tilt Poker.

=== 2025 GGMillion$ cheating scandals ===
In late 2025, GGPoker confronted two consecutive integrity breaches in its flagship $10,300 GGMillion$ tournament series, resulting in permanent bans and significant financial restitution.

During the October 14 GGMillion$ final table, a player using the screen name "RealOA" shared his screen via video conferencing software in a group chat administered by professional player Ren "Tony" Lin, a GGPoker brand ambassador, and received real-time strategic coaching while competing. GGPoker permanently banned RealOA and confiscated $250,523 from his account. Lin was indefinitely suspended from GGPoker, the World Series of Poker, and all affiliated platforms, and contributed $96,380 from personal funds toward the $346,903 total restitution to affected players. Lin was also physically removed from Day 2 of the WSOP Super Circuit Cyprus Main Event.

Weeks later, during the November 9 GGMillion$, GGPoker's security team identified that the account "Hinaru" was being operated by someone other than the registered holder — a practice known as ghosting. Although Hinaru entered the final table on November 11 as chip leader, the account was blocked before play began and was blinded out during the livestream. Both the account holder and the unauthorised player were permanently banned, and $115,752 in winnings was redistributed to affected players.

The incidents were notable for GGPoker's willingness to intervene mid-tournament and to extend online sanctions to live events, including the removal of Lin from an in-progress live tournament.

== Angle shooting ==
Angle shooting is engaging in actions that may technically be within the scope of the rules of the game, but that are considered unethical or unfair to exploit or take advantage of another player. For example, an angle shooter might motion as if they were folding their hand to induce other players to fold theirs out of turn.

One form of angle shooting which is exclusive to online poker is to abuse the disconnect protection (DP) rules most sites have in place. DP is a rule exclusive to online poker whereby if a player is disconnected from the site in the middle of the hand their hand is played out as if they were all-in without the player actually having to put any more money in the pot. The online poker rooms that offer DP usually have specific tables set aside for this so that all players at the table are aware that the special DP rules will apply.

How this is used by angle shooters is if a player is in a hand that they are unsure if they have the best cards and don't want to invest any more money to find out. They can unplug their internet connection and then wait for the hand to play itself out. On a DP table the remaining cards in the hand would be dealt and the pot would be awarded to the player with the best cards. If there were multiple opponents in the hand then they would be eligible for a side pot.

Another example is when a player says nothing when betting, pushes in a raise, then says he made an error (a/k/a "misclick") & meant to just call. The opposing player(s) may take this as a sign of weakness and then re-raise or simply call when they shouldn't, as the player may actually have "the nuts" (the best possible hand based on the cards in play). This could be done in reverse via a bluff by betting without announcing the bet & betting less than the minimum call, then when the underbet is realized by the dealer, the player can claim they thought they raised, but the player apparently miscounted and bet less than the required call, which is then required to be increased to become a call. This makes the player appear strong and may induce a fold to the player's weak hand.

== Notable cheaters ==
- Soapy Smith (1860-1898)
- Titanic Thompson

== In popular culture ==
- The Cincinnati Kid
- The Sting
- Shade
- Rounders
- Tilt
- Maverick
- Red Dead Redemption
- Casino
- Lucky Luke
- "A Losing Streak"

== See also ==
- Bottom dealing
- Card counting
- Card marking
- Casino security
- Cheating in baseball
- Cheating in casinos
- Cheating in chess
- Four flush
- Muck
- Second dealing
