= A Phule and His Money =

1999 novel by Robert Asprin

A Phule And His Money
- Author: Robert Asprin and Peter J. Heck
- Cover artist: Walter Valez
- Language: English
- Series: Phule's Company
- Genre: Science fiction
- Publisher: Ace Books
- Publication place: United States
- Media type: Print (paperback)
- Pages: 277 (first edition)
- ISBN: 0-441-00658-2
- Preceded by: Phule's Paradise
- Followed by: Phule Me Twice

A Phule And His Money is the third novel of the comic military science fiction Phule's Company series by Robert Asprin. The book was first published by Ace Books in October 1999, and follows the adventures of Willard J. Phule.
