= Ronald Dale Harris =

American fraudster

Ronald Dale Harris is a computer programmer who worked for the Nevada Gaming Control Board in the early 1990s and was responsible for finding flaws and gaffes in software that runs computerized casino games. Harris took advantage of his expertise, reputation and access to source code to illegally modify certain slot machines to pay out large sums of money when a specific sequence and number of coins were inserted. From 1993 to 1995, Harris and an accomplice stole thousands of dollars from Las Vegas casinos, accomplishing one of the most successful and undetected scams in casino history.

Towards the end of his stint, Harris shifted his focus to the probability game Keno, for which he developed a program that would determine which numbers the game's pseudorandom number generator would select beforehand. When Harris' accomplice, Reid Errol McNeal, attempted to redeem a high value winning keno ticket at Bally's Atlantic City Casino Hotel in Atlantic City, New Jersey, casino executives became suspicious of him and notified New Jersey gaming investigators. The investigation led authorities to Harris and after a trial was sentenced to seven years in prison. He was released from prison after serving two years and currently resides in Las Vegas.

Harris is listed in the Nevada Gaming Control Board's black book and prohibited from entering casinos.

== See also ==
- Gambling
- Cheating in casinos
