= Second dealing =

Method of cheating in card games

Second dealing (also known as dealing seconds) is a method of manipulating a deck of cards during a card game by way of dealing the second, rather than the top card of the deck, usually for the purpose of cheating. Second dealing and bottom dealing are also used in performance magic.

A card cheat who specializes in manipulating playing cards is called a card mechanic; a card mechanic who specializes in second dealing is called a "second dealer", a "deuce dealer", a "two dealer", or a "number two man."

Second dealing is only useful when the cheat knows the value of the top card of the deck. Once the value of the top card is known the cheat may resort to second dealing in order to avoid dealing a good card to an opponent, or to avoid dealing a bad card to himself or to a secret accomplice.

== Method ==
In order to secretly gain knowledge of the value of the top card, second dealing is always used in conjunction with other cheating methods. One of the easiest, and most common methods of gaining knowledge of the top card is to employ the use of marked cards. When marked cards are not in use the cheat can still gain knowledge of the top card by means of peeking, flashing (to an accomplice; and receiving signals), or by employing the use of various mechanical devices that enable the cheat to see the value of the top card of the deck.

Second dealing is generally done by dealing the cards from the hand. While holding the deck in the hand, the dealer will either push the top card to the side - revealing a small portion of the back of the second card (called 'the brief'), and strike the second card instead (this method is known as the strike second deal), or by pushing two top cards as one, in almost perfect alignment, and peeling off the second card while pushing the top card back flush with the deck (this method is called the pushoff second deal). Both methods have some advantages and disadvantages, depending on the situation.

Second dealing can also be done when the cards are dealt from a dealing shoe, such as in many casino games. In this case the dealer will push the top card upwards and strike the partially exposed second card. Although this method is usually employed with the use of a gaffed dealing shoe, an expert card mechanic can do it with a regular dealing shoe as well.

The second deal can be performed using either one or two hands, and also from a tabled deck, again using one or two hands. The practice of using the dealing hand in such a way that disguises the deal is known as 'using shade'. The practice of tilting the deck to help provide 'shade' is known as a 'necktie'.

== Countermeasures ==
The practice of using a burn card developed to help prevent second dealing. When burn cards are used, the top card is always discarded and the second one dealt. This is intended to prevent the dealer from gaining information about the next card to be dealt, since the second card is concealed by the top. Ironically, the second deal can be used to discard the second card from the pack and deal the original first.

The design of the back of the card can either help or hinder second dealing. A playing deck with only a solid color back makes second dealing very difficult to detect. Less so are cards with a uniform pattern or a single logo, such as an airline promotional pack. Easiest to detect are cards with a strong white border design, which appears stationary on the top card as the second card is slid out from underneath.

Tells on the second deal include changes in pace when a second is made, variations in the dealing card noise on a second, strange deck movements when dealing a second, or odd finger movements. Odd grips are sometimes employed, which can suggest someone is not dealing honestly.

== See also ==
- Bottom dealing
- Cheating at poker
- Card marking
