= Burn card =

Card discarded from the top of a deck

In card games, a burn card is a playing card dealt from the top of a deck and discarded ("burned"), unused by the players. Burn cards are usually not shown to the players.

Burning is most often performed in casinos to deter a form of cheating known as card marking.

== Usage ==
In poker, the top card of the deck stub is burned at the beginning of each betting round so that players who might have been able to read markings on that card during the previous round are less able to take advantage of that information. Knowledge of a burn card might be marginally useful, such as knowing there is one fewer Ace in the deck, but far less so than knowing it is about to be in play.

Two other uses for burning are: to prevent second dealing and to provide extra cards for use when an irregularity of play occurs. Sometimes a misdealt card (such as one of the down cards in poker that has flashed during the deal) will be used as the burn card – in those cases, the card should be immediately placed face-up on the deck after the deal is complete.

When Texas hold 'em (as well as in Omaha hold 'em) is played in casinos (or other formal games where cheating is a concern), a card is burned before dealing the flop, turn, and river, for a maximum of 3 total burn cards.
