= Casino pit =

Area of a casino with gaming tables

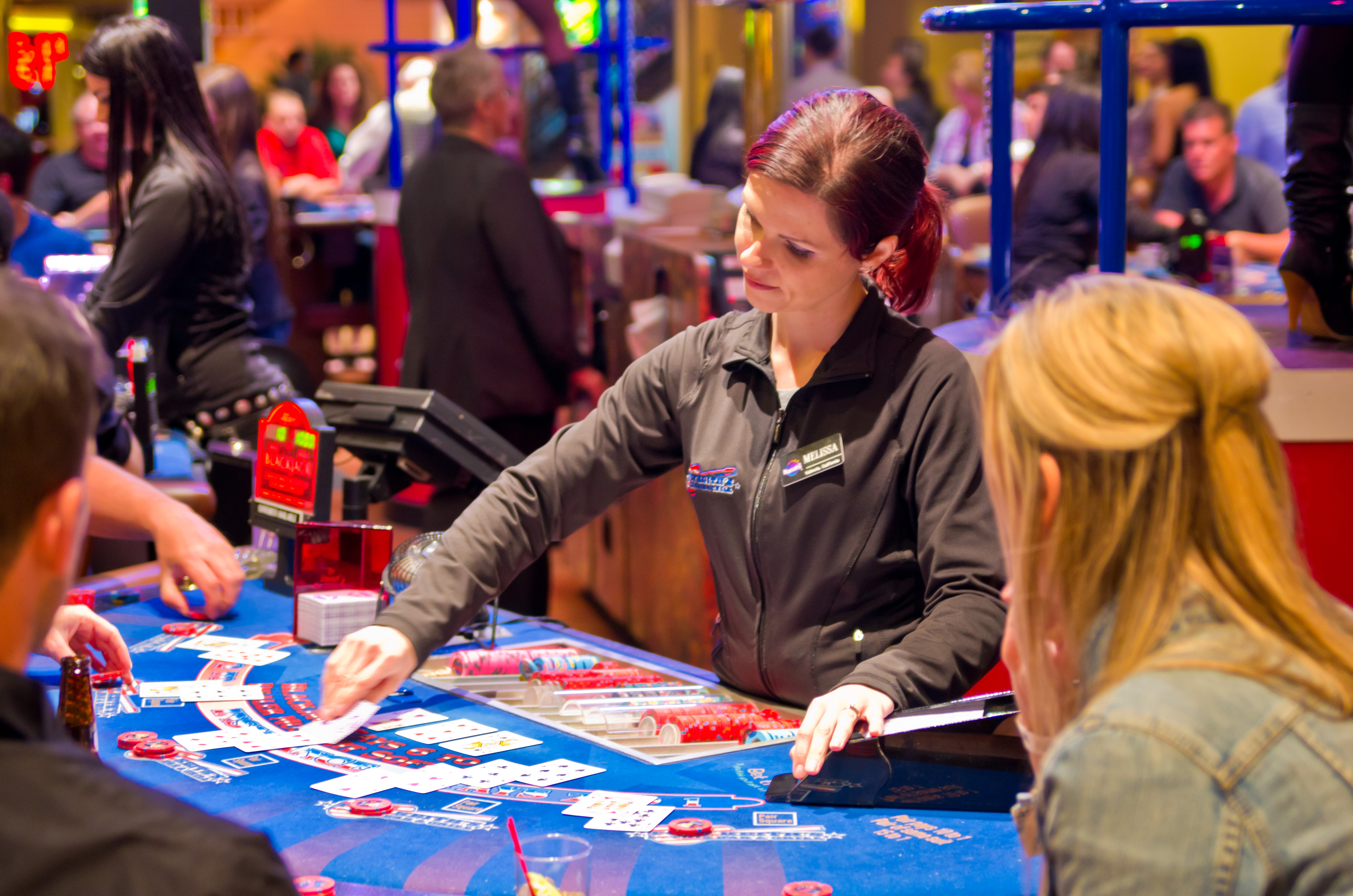
Pit area at Harrah's Reno

A casino pit is an area of a casino which typically contains tables for blackjack, craps, roulette, and other games.

Typically, a pit is organized as two rows of gaming tables arranged back-to-back. The tables face outward toward a public aisleway. The space between the rows is restricted to dealers and other casino personnel. Besides dealers, the pit personnel include game supervisors, called floormen clerks who man computer terminals where information about players and tables is input; a pit manager (or "pit boss") who supervises the entire pit; and various other personnel who are in and out of the pit to supply tables with chips, empty money boxes, and perform other maintenance tasks.

Pits may vary in size, depending on the size of the casino, but are typically eight to twelve blackjack-sized tables or six to eight large craps or roulette tables. At the end of each pit may be nothing more than a barrier keeping the public out, or another game table facing a cross aisle. Small casinos may feature only one pit, while larger resorts in Las Vegas, Atlantic City, or Monte Carlo may have a dozen or more, with pits devoted to a single game such as craps or roulette.
