= Peter Heck =

American writer (born 1941)

- Born: Peter Jewell Heck; September 4, 1941 (age 84); Chestertown, Maryland, U.S.
- Occupation: Author
- Writing career
- Genres: Science fiction; mystery fiction

Peter Jewell Heck (born September 4, 1941, in Chestertown, Maryland) is an American science fiction and mystery author. His books include the "Mark Twain Mysteries"—historical whodunits featuring the famous author as a detective—and four books in the "Phule's Company" series, in collaboration with Robert Asprin, best described as "F-Troop in space". He also wrote the 36th chapter of Atlanta Nights, a book meant to ruin PublishAmerica's reputation.

Heck has also been an editor at Ace Books (where he edited Lynn S. Hightower and Robert J. Sawyer, among others), and created the SF newsletter Xignals and its mystery equivalent Crime Times for the Waldenbooks chain. He is also a regular reviewer for Asimov's Science Fiction and Kirkus Reviews.

In 2007, Heck began working as a reporter at the Kent County News in Chestertown, Maryland, where he and his wife moved after a number of years in Brooklyn, NY. His work for the paper includes articles on local government and history, health, environment, and the arts; it has won several awards from the MDDC Press Association. He also plays guitar and banjo in a local band, Col. Leonard's Irregulars. In 2017, Heck and his wife became editors of The Chestertown Spy, an online newspaper.

== Bibliography ==
=== Novels ===
The Mark Twain Mysteries

1. Death on the Mississippi. New York: Berkley Prime Crime. 1995.
2. A Connecticut Yankee in criminal court. New York: Berkley Prime Crime. 1996.
3. The prince and the prosecutor. New York: Berkley Prime Crime. 1997.
4. The guilty abroad. New York: Berkley Prime Crime. 1999.
5. The mysterious strangler. New York: Berkley Prime Crime. 2000.
6. Tom's lawyer. New York: Berkley Prime Crime. 2001.

Phule's Company with Robert Asprin

1. A Phule and His Money. New York: Ace Books. 1999.
2. Phule Me Twice. New York: Ace Books. 2001.
3. No Phule Like an Old Phule. New York: Ace Books. 2004.
4. Phule's Errand. New York: Ace Books. 2006.
