= Card marking =

Modification to playing cards

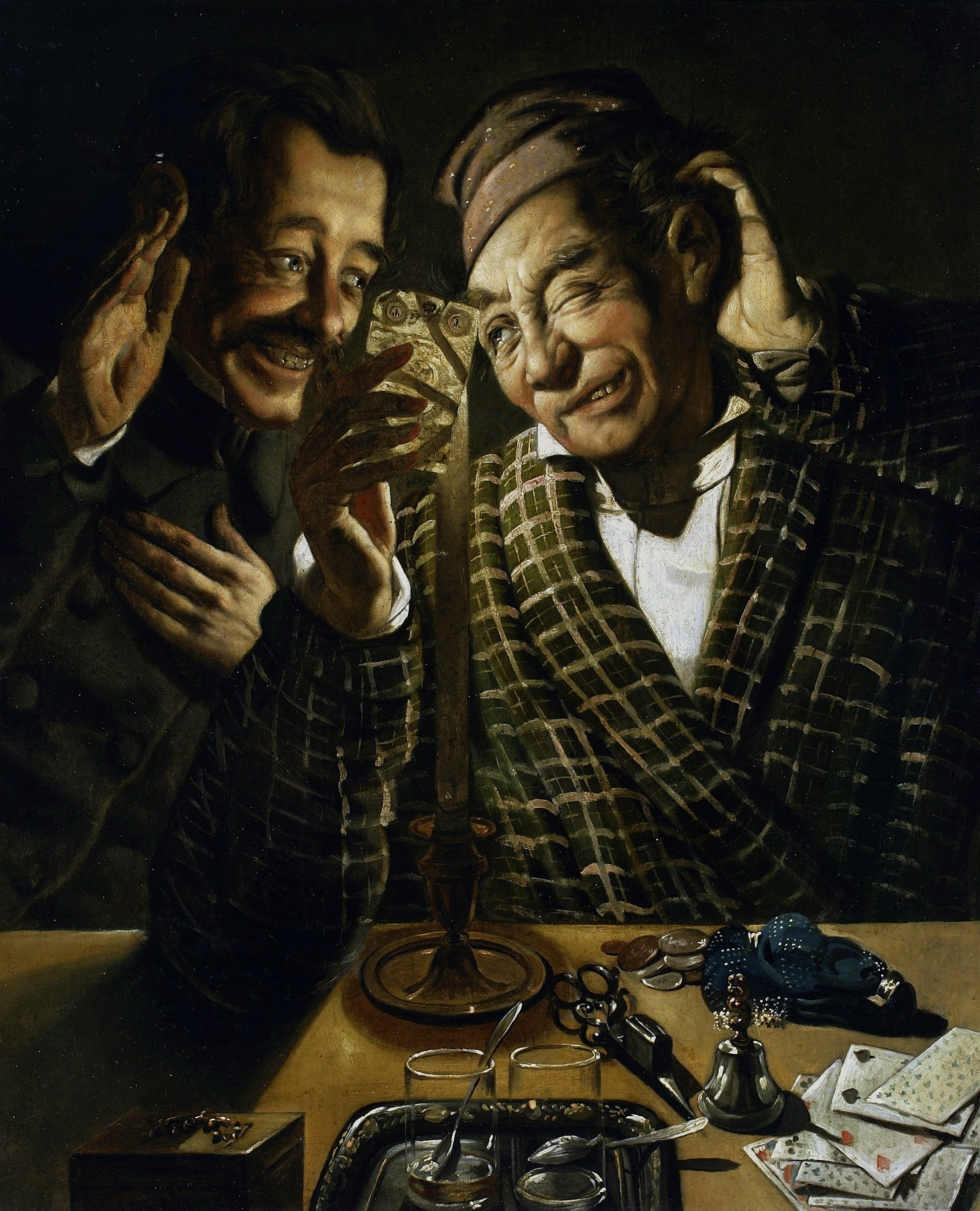
Pęczarski's 1845 work Card-sharpers by candlelight, depicting a card whose back has been marked, possibly using wax to add lines which become slightly visible when reflecting light

Card marking is the process of altering playing cards in a method only apparent to marker or conspirator, such as by bending or adding visible marks to a card. This allows different methods for card sharps to cheat or for magicians to perform magic tricks. To be effective, the distinguishing mark or marks must be visible on the obverse sides of the cards, which are normally uniform.

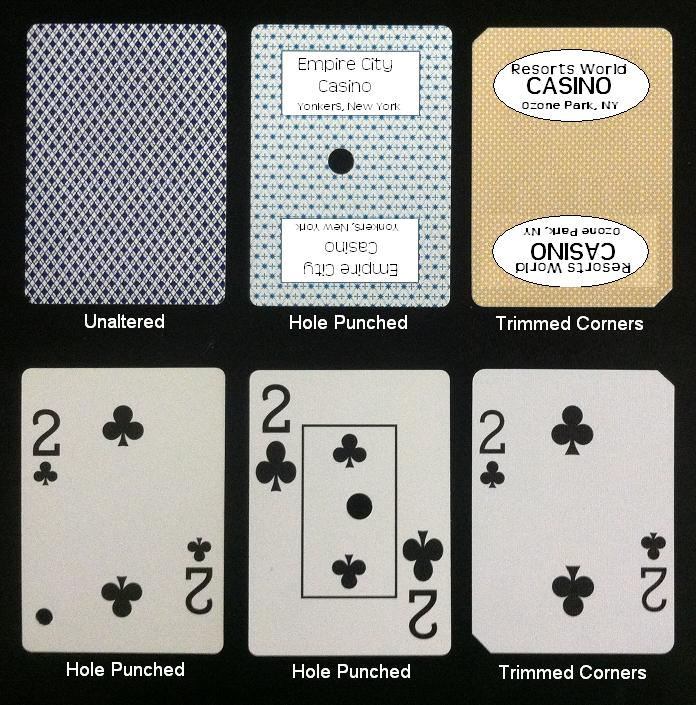
Casinos alter playing cards used at table games before they are sold or given away to prevent cheaters from buying them to cheat at table games.

Card marking is often used to cheat when gambling or for card tricks. Many casinos, particularly those in Las Vegas alter the decks of cards they sell to tourists – either by punching holes through the middle of cards or trimming their edges – to prevent cheaters from returning to the game tables after buying the cards and then slipping the favorable cards into their hands when playing.

Marked cards can be used regardless of who shuffles and deals the cards. Some more sophisticated marked-cards scams involve additional manipulative skills to steer the cards into the correct positions once the desired cards have been identified.

== History ==
The first attempts to mark playing cards involved bends, crimps and tiny pinprick bumps known as "blisters", resembling the Braille script. Later, when the first designs appeared on the backs of playing cards, cheats began altering the designs on the backs of cards. Hustlers have used various inks, pigments and scratches, to add or remove lines or patterns from the back of the card design. Some varieties of card marking include block-out work, cut-out work, scroll work, shade work and tint work.

More recently, science and technology have also enhanced marked-card techniques. Modern technologies are variations of shade techniques. Traditional block-out and cut-out work have the disadvantage that they must be read close-up, because the marks are small. On the other hand, another advantage of luminous and juice marked-card technology is that they can be read close-up or from across a table.

== Processes ==
=== Block-out ===
Block-out work is simply using the same color ink as the back of the card and coloring in small white areas of the card. For example, sometimes people add ink to the flowers on the back of a card by making the petals narrower or blocking out a bird on the back design.

=== Tinting ===
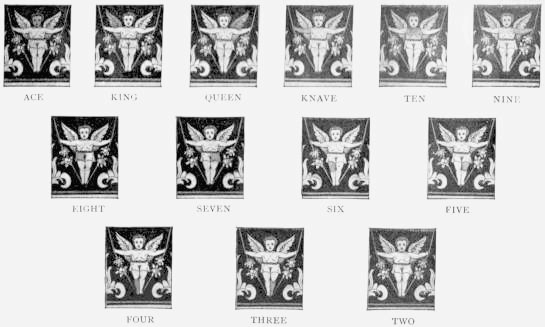
By subtly tinting different body parts of this small "angel" feature on the back of a playing card - the head for an ace, the left wing for a king, etc. - the card's rank can be discerned. The two is left unmarked.

A more subtle variation on blocking, card backs can be marked by lightly tinting certain areas of a detail. Rather than blocking out the entire petal on a flower detail, the petal is washed with a light ink of a similar colour to the card ink.

=== Cut-out ===
Cut-out work is use of a razor to scrape off some of the printed areas of the card, such as adding (cutting out) a white bird to the back design.

=== Shading ===
- Luminous marking - These can only be read by using special gimmick sunglasses or by wearing contact lenses. The original luminous systems used red lenses and greenish ink on the back of red cards, though more recent variations use chemicals applied to the cards.
- Video-luminous marking - Video-luminous cards use marks that can not be seen by the human eye, even through a luminous filter. The marks can only be read by using custom-designed electronics and filters and displayed on a TV monitor in another room to a partner. Then the card values may be signaled or transmitted to the player who needs to know. Video-luminous does not have to be used for cheating. They may be used for magic or by a poker house or person who may want to analyze a card game after the fact. If collusion is suspected, the recorded images of the marked cards may be played back later to detect any unusual play. If a player consistently folds a good hand when a partner plays a better hand, then it can be assumed that collusion is taking place in the game. Since these marks cannot be seen by the human eye, there is no chance of detection of the marks, even by knowledgeable players, during the game. Often such marked decks will only be introduced by the house when suspected colluders are seated.
- Juice-marking - The marks are only visible when a person is trained to read the marks. No filtered sunglasses are required, although glasses can be used to make it easier to spot these marks.
- Tintwork or shade - This technique uses a tint solution to mark cards, but the marking patterns vary depending upon the back design of the cards being marked.
- Daub - A special paste is used by a player to mark someone else's deck, on the fly, while the cards are being used during a game and even while being watched. This eliminates the need to switch in a pre-marked deck of cards.
- Juice dust - An advanced type of daub, it may be used to make an ad hoc juiced deck. Like daub, it also allows a player to mark someone else's deck, on the fly, while being watched. The main advantages of juice dust are that it will not dull the finish of the cards and that it works on both paper and 100% plastic playing cards.

It is not necessary to mark the entire deck in order to gain an advantage in most types of poker - even marking just one rank (especially the aces) is enough to gain a significant advantage in a game such as Texas hold 'em.

== Detecting marked cards ==
Some marked cards can be identified by performing the gamblers' riffle test (also known as "going to the movies"). Looking at the back of the cards while they are being riffled, the marks will "dance" around the back of the cards, provided that the viewer knows what sort of marks to look for. The riffle test is less effective for detecting cards marked with luminous and juice methods.

Reflected light off the back of the card will reveal cut-out work (scratches or white ink), as well as many inks or solutions that tend to dull the finish on playing cards because they are alcohol-based. Only the highest quality solutions will not burn the finish of cards. Placing a drop of alcohol on a card and then looking at the finish by reflecting light off the back reveals the dulling effect that these cheap solutions can cause.

== See also ==
- Bottom dealing
- Second dealing
- Edge sorting
- MindPlay
