= Phule's Company =

1990 comic military science fiction novel by Robert Asprin

- Cover of the 1990 first-edition paperback
- Author: Robert Asprin
- Cover artist: James Warhola
- Language: English
- Series: Phule's Company
- Genre: Science fiction (Comic sci-fi, military sci-fi)
- Publisher: Ace Books
- Publication date: July 1990
- Publication place: United States
- Media type: Print (paperback)
- Pages: 232pp (first edition)
- ISBN: 0-441-66251-X
- Followed by: Phule's Paradise

This is about the 1990 novel. For an overview of the whole series of novels, see Phule's Company (series).

Phule's Company is a comic military science fiction novel written by Robert Asprin and originally published in 1990. The book follows the comedic events as Willard J. Phule, the rich son of a millionaire arms manufacturer, reforms a group of misfits in the Space Legion, a fictional organization similar to the French Foreign Legion, into an "elite fighting force". The book is primarily narrated by Phule's butler Beeker. Phule's Company received generally positive reviews and made the New York Times Best Seller list.

== Plot ==
The book begins as Willard Phule, a multimillionaire, is court-martialed by the Space Legion for ordering the strafing of a treaty signing ceremony. For his punishment, he is given command of an Omega Company full of misfits on Haskin's Planet, a mining settlement on the edge of settled space. He quickly goes to his duty station and leverages his personal money and a knack for managing people to get the company to come together as a unit. His antics attract the attention of the local and interplanetary press, but create a very cohesive unit of the Legionnaires.

When a contract for an honorary duty is awarded to the Regular Army on Haskin's Planet, Phule convinces the governor to leave the contract up for competition between the Space Legionnaires and the Regular Army. The Army sends some of their most elite troops to take part in the competition, and through an impressive show of cooperation and teamwork, Phule's company ties the regular troops. In the final episode of the book, Phule's company encounters lizard-like alien explorers from the Zenobian Empire. Quickly reverting to his business instincts, Phule negotiates a business deal to sell swampland to the creatures in exchange for new technologies. This again enrages some of his superiors, but because of a show of support from the Legionnaires for their commander and a complete conviction of his own innocence, Phule evades court-martial again.

== Critical reception ==
While reviewing the book for Legends Magazine, Marcus Pan commented that the book was "rather engrossing", "lighthearted" and had character development complete with character flaws and "endearing personalities" that made Phule's Company "a fun book to read." Similarly, Paul Stuewe in the Toronto Star, noted how "Phule's company spoofs the space-soldier brand of science fiction" classifying it along with Kim Stanley Robinson's Escape from Kathmandu as "low-key [and] somewhat lightweight entertainments that keep pages turning pleasantly enough."
