= Eye in the sky (camera) =

Ceiling-mounted video surveillance camera

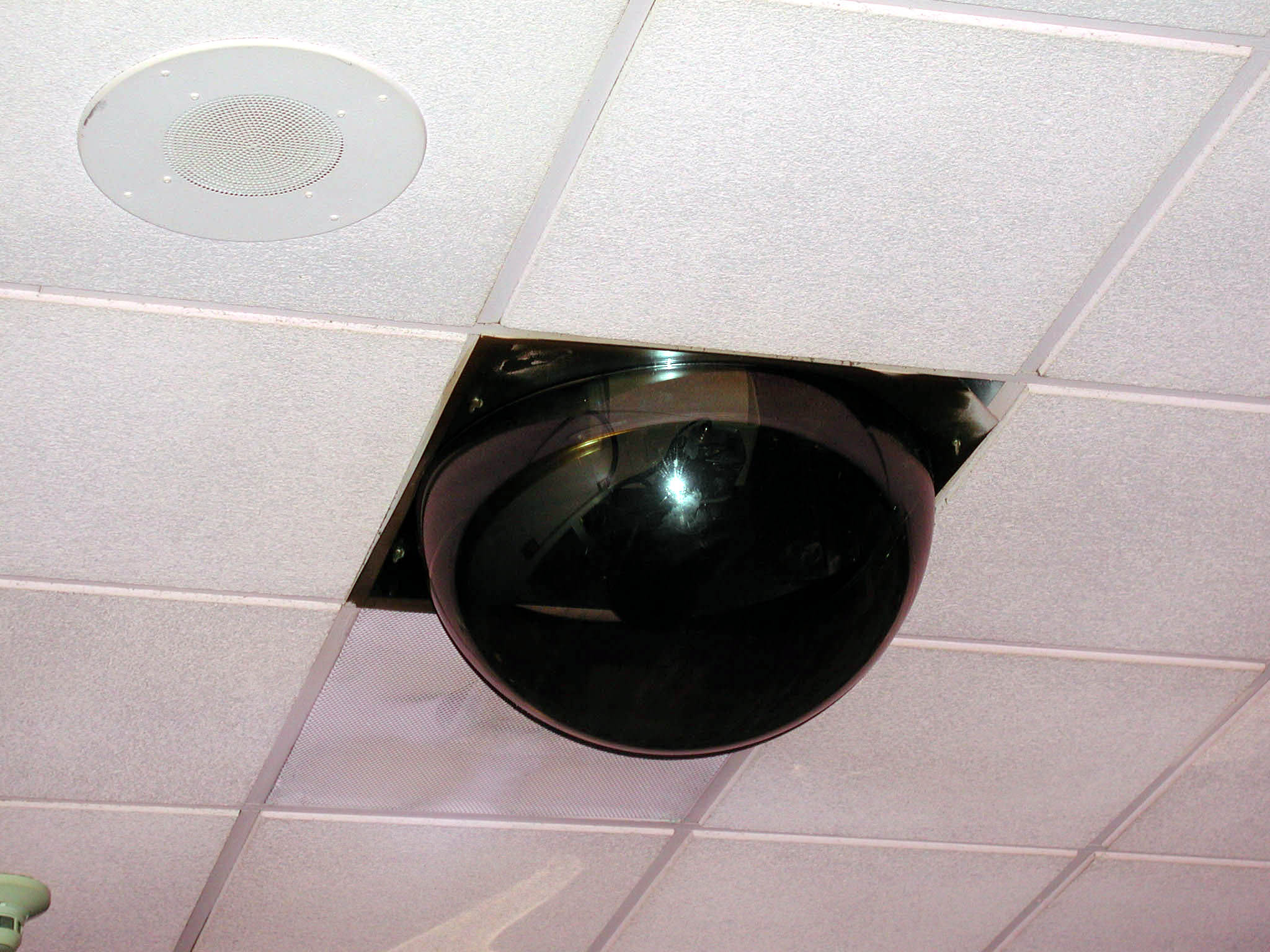
An "eye in the sky" camera in a casino observes players

The eye in the sky is a term given to closed-circuit television (CCTV) cameras in casinos and other commercial enterprises. In casinos, they are positioned to monitor seats, tables, hallways, restaurants, and even elevators closely. The functional component is known as a pan–tilt–zoom camera, or a PTZ, an industry standard term.

== Overview ==
The PTZ camera is covered by a semi-transparent plastic globe which makes it nearly impossible to see which direction the camera is facing from a distance. Retail stores often install empty globes, giving the appearance of additional cameras. The camera is mounted on a series of interconnected gears and levers, which usually allow two axes of rotation. This rotation can either be controlled manually by an operator using remote control, or it can be automated using motion sensing technology. In most commercial and civilian applications, both control methods are used simultaneously to allow automated surveillance of general movement while allowing a manual override mode to view specific subjects more closely.

== Application ==
These cameras often help casino officials judge whether the person is card counting or past posting. In case a crime or a cheat is detected after the fact, the casino employees can review the recorded tapes and find the culprit. The casino cameras are adjusted to focus on certain suspicious players by security workers in a separate casino room with banks of security monitors.

These types of cameras are also found in retail stores as well to monitor customers and employees, such as Walmart or Target. They can also fool robbers into thinking that there is a camera watching them and that they are being monitored by CCTV.

== See also ==
- Casino security
- Panopticon
