= Casino security =

Security staff and equipment at casinos

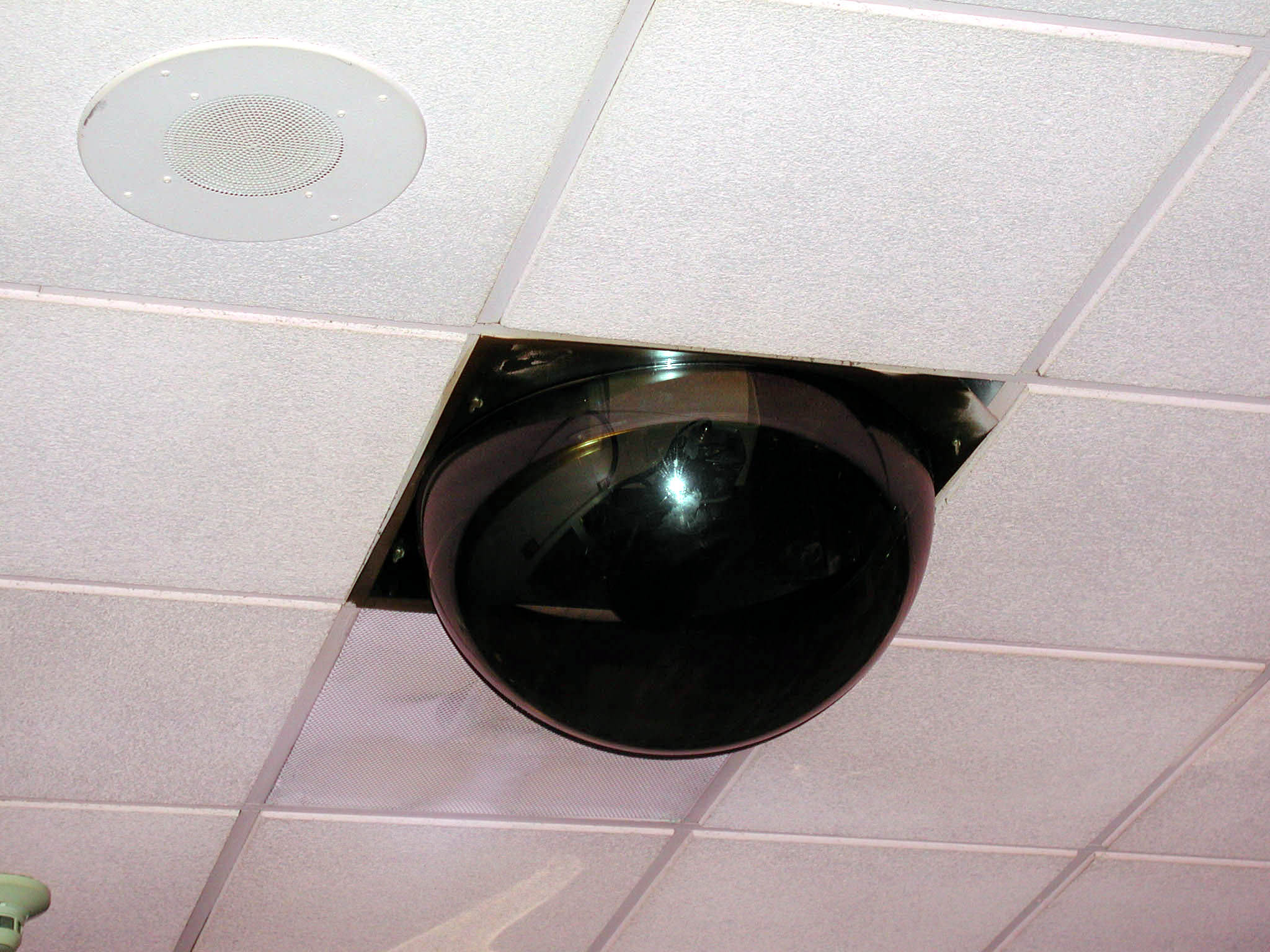
The "eye in the sky" is a typical means of casino security.

Casino security refers to the measures that are taken at casinos to protect the establishment's money, property and patrons. The security protects the casino and its customers from violent crime, theft, and other inappropriate behavior.

Given the relatively large amounts of currency that are handled within a casino, the temptation exists for both patrons and staff to commit crimes. Many casinos take security measures to prevent theft and other crime. The most basic level of security today consists of cameras located throughout the property operated by highly trained individuals who attempt to locate cheating and stealing by both players and employees.

While casino security of the past was nothing more than a "muscle man", today's security is a multimillion-dollar investment that is as complex as a police department. Modern casino security is usually divided between a physical security force, often trained professionals who patrol the casino floor and responds to calls for assistance and reports of criminal and/or suspicious activities, and a specialized surveillance department that operates the casino's closed-circuit-television system (known in the industry as the eye in the sky) in an effort to detect any misconduct by both guests and employees alike. Both of these specialized casino departments work very closely with each other to ensure the safety of both guests as well as the casino's assets, and have been quite successful in preventing crime. Before video surveillance technology, most casinos had catwalks in the ceiling above the casino floor. The catwalks allowed surveillance personnel to look directly down, through one way glass, on the activities at the tables and/or slot machines.

In addition to cameras and other technological measures, casinos also enforce security through rules of conduct and behavior; for example, players at card games are usually required to keep their hands visible at all times.

The amount of security that is used at a casino is determined based on local laws and ordinances and what the prosecutors in the region are willing to act upon.

== Purpose ==
Security in casinos serves the following purposes:

- Manual and video surveillance of the facility
- Protection of patrons of the facility
- Protection of cash and other valuables within the facility
- Looking out for cheating gamblers
- Checking the age of those entering to determine if they comply with requirements
- Breaking up fights and dealing with other incidents
- Removal of those who are in violation of casino rules
- Making a citizen's arrest when necessary
- Building a case against violators for prosecution

== By game ==
=== Roulette ===
In roulette, the following rules are enforced for security reasons:

- Players are not to collect their winnings and betting chips on the outside chances until all of the winnings in the same box (e.g. all bets and winnings on 'red') have been paid. This is to avoid confusion and minimize the chance for players to steal other players' chips.
- Players must not touch chips after the dealer gives the hand signal or announces "no more bets". Players are not allowed to remove, change or add bets past this point.
- When the dealer has placed the "dolly" (the plastic marker used to mark the winning number) it is strictly prohibited to touch any chips on a winning chance.
- Croupiers are not allowed to take money to change for chips from a player's hand. If the player wishes to change he or she must place the money on the layout of the table.
- The use of electronic equipment at the table such as mobile phones and cameras is also prohibited.
- The only items allowed in front of a player are: Chips, money, drinks, cigarettes. Bulky items such as wallets and purses or bags must not be on the table.

=== Craps ===
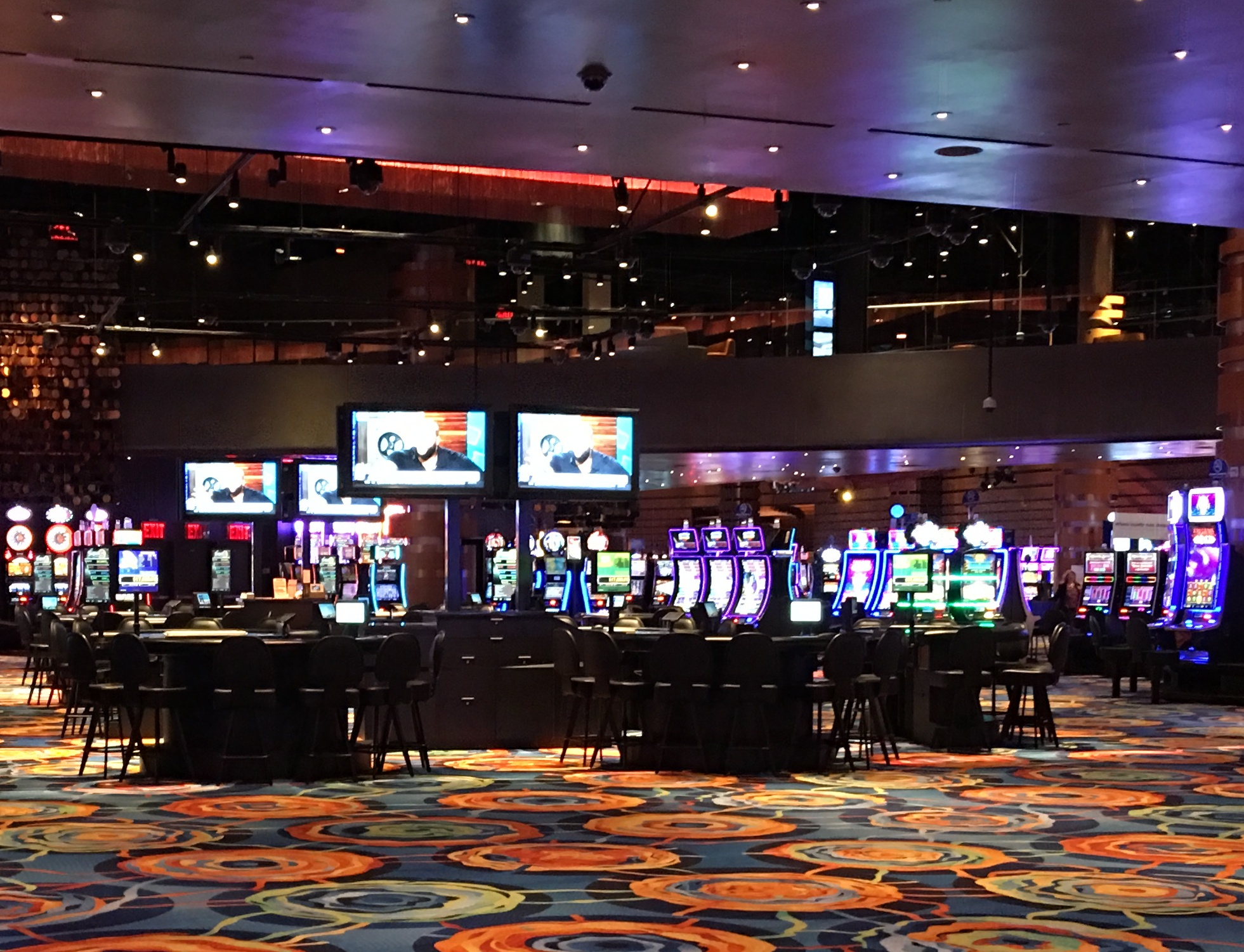
Pit area at the Ocean Resort Casino

In craps, all the tables within a casino are arranged in a "pit". There is a supervisor security who is known as a "pit boss" who is in charge of the security of all craps tables. Below the pit boss are a group of floormen who are assigned to watching the craps table to look out for cheating and any unusual activity. There is generally one floorman per table. This is all in addition to the "eye in the sky" security.

Additionally, the following rules are enforced:

- Players are not supposed to handle the dice with more than one hand (such as shaking them in cupped hands before rolling) nor take the dice past the edge of the table. The only way to change hands when throwing dice, if permitted at all, is to set the dice on the table, let go, then take them with the other hand. This reduces or eliminates the possibility of the shooter switching dice by sleight-of-hand.
- When throwing the dice, the player is expected to hit the farthest wall at the opposite end of the table. Most casinos will allow a roll that does not hit the opposite wall as long as the dice are thrown past the middle of the table. Occasionally a short roll will be called a "no roll" due to the more controllable nature of such a roll. The dice may not be slid across the table and must be tossed. Typically, players are asked not to throw the dice higher than the eye level of the dealers.
- Dice are considered "in play" if they land on players' bets on the table, the dealer's working stacks, on the marker puck or with one die resting on top of the other. The roll is invalid if either or both dice land in the boxman's bank, the stickman's bowl (where the extra three dice are kept between rolls), or in the rails around the top of the table where players chips are kept. If a die or both dice leave the table, it is also a "no roll" and the boxman will examine the dice before letting them come back into the game. However, the player may request the same die or dice.
- When either of the dice land on or come to rest leaning against chips, markers, or the side of the table, the number that would be on top if the object the die is leaning on were removed, is the number that is used to make the call.
- If one or both dice hits a player or dealer and rolls back onto the table, the roll counts as long as the person being hit did not interfere with either of the dice, though some casinos will rule "no roll" for this situation.
- In most casinos the shooter may "set" the dice to a particular starting configuration before throwing (such as showing a particular number or combination, stacking the dice, or spacing them to be picked up between different fingers), but if they do, they are often asked to be quick about it so as not to delay the game. Some casinos have "no setting" rules.
- Dealers are not allowed to touch the players or hand chips directly to a player, and vice versa. If "buying in" (paying cash for chips) at the table, players are expected to lay the cash down on the layout, which the dealer will take and then place chips in front of the player.
- Some crap table layouts state "No Call Bets." A call bet is made when a player is allowed to make a bet without first placing the necessary chips in the right spot on the table. This might occur while a player is waiting for a marker (casino credit) to arrive, or after the dice have left the center of the table (after which time the players must usually remove their hands from the playing surface).
- In most jurisdictions the casino may ask a player to leave the table or the casino for any reason, typically for winning; however, courts in New Jersey and North Las Vegas have ruled this common practice to be illegal for law-abiding customers.

== See also ==
- Cheating in casinos
- Eye in the sky (camera)
