= Pit manager =

Director of employees in a casino pit

A pit manager (also known as a pit boss) is the person who directs the employees who work in a casino pit. The job of the pit boss is to manage the floormen, who are the supervisors for table games dealers in a casino. One pit boss monitors all floormen, dealers, and players in the pit; there is usually one floorman for every six tables. The floormen correct minor mistakes, but if a severe gaming discrepancy arises (such as duplicate cards being found in a deck), it is the job of the pit boss to sort it out.
