= Late betting =

Gambling cheat; making a bet after no more bets can be taken

Late betting or past posting is making a bet after the time when no more bets are to be taken. It is considered cheating; information may have become available, including the outcome of the event, that was not available to those making earlier bets.

The term past posting originates from horse racing where a bugler sounds a "call to the post" just before the race begins ("post time"). This is also the signal that no more bets can be taken. Any bets made after that time occur after or past "the post".

In other forms of gambling, the dealer may announce "No more bets" or wave their hand over the table in a specific manner. In roulette, for example, past posting refers to placing a bet after the ball lands in a pocket. The player has to distract the croupier's attention to either move the bet to or place a bet on the winning number. Past posters in roulette games play in teams. According to most cheating strategies, the player who succeeded in placing a past-posting bet and did not get caught is to make a few more bets (now legal) and leave the table.

Past posting was more feasible in the days before live television or radio broadcasts of sporting events. A famous example described by magician, gaming and gambling authority John Scarne was the "Blondie Mob"— five young blonde women who cheated bookmakers in the Los Angeles area out of at least $1 million during the 1940s. Bookmakers would allow their big customers to gamble in a sealed-off, soundproofed room, where communication with the outside world was in theory impossible, except by the bookmaker's telephone. Bets were accepted until the time the bookmaker was informed of the result (i.e., until a few minutes after the race had been completed). The scam was achieved by having a confederate with access to newswire services telephone in a smaller bet on an unrelated race and asking the bookmaker to repeat the details of the bet for confirmation. The details, repeated by the bookmaker, contained coded information indicating the winner of the just-completed race.

The 1973 film The Sting features this technique as the basis of a successful con in 1936 played on character Doyle Lonnegan (actor Robert Shaw) in which Western Union wire transmissions were used before they were made public to place bets on races which had actually finished a few minutes earlier. In addition, Came a Hot Friday, set in 1949 and starring Peter Bland, showed a less elaborate practice of past posting, but in this case, the ruse went wrong. In James Joyce's Ulysses (published 1922, set in 1904), Leopold Bloom muses on the possibility of establishing a private wireless telegraph that would give him the race results from Britain faster than the standard telegram service, allowing him to make post factum bets.

A variant of this is "pinching", where the bet is not moved, but its amount is changed after the result. After a losing bet, the player removes chips from a stack through sleight-of-hand to reduce losses. The player may also plant high-value chips underneath one or more low-value chips visible on top, further reducing the payment for lost rounds. However, a bet found with high-value chips underneath low-value chips may be seen as suspicious. In either case, the top chip remains unchanged giving the same outward appearance of the bet, and will not be altered if the bet wins. This would be less practical to repeat over and over on the more long-shot bets like straight-up, whereas the even-payout bets on average would only require close to one pinched loss for every unpinched win.

Pinching may be done on many casino games, and in the case of card games, a skilled cheater may use cards to both snatch a chip out of the stack and conceal it as it is slid back to the player's pile. This method not only allows the cheater to stealthily increase their winnings by removing bets after the outcome is known, but also to cleverly hide their actions by blending them with legitimate gameplay, making detection by casino personnel challenging.

Another variant of cheating at a casino game is known as "bet capping." In this case, once the outcome of the game is known, the player then adds more chips to his winning bet. This increases the amount of the win, even though the player did not make a high original bet.

== See also ==
- Insider trading
- Courtsiding
