= Holdout (gambling) =

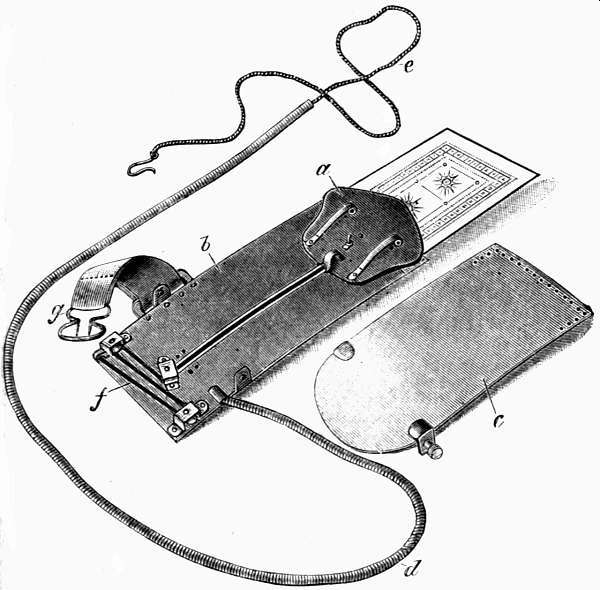
Kepplinger holdout machine

In gambling jargon, a holdout is any of numerous accessories used by cheats to help them "hold-out" a card (or cards) during a card game. Some holdout devices are extremely simple and require moderate or advanced manipulative skill to be used properly. On the other hand, there is a group of holdout devices which are mechanical in nature, therefore they fall under a separate category of holdout machines. Even if those machines are complex mechanical apparatuses, they still require a good level of skill from the cheat's part, to be used so that they work but are not noticed.

Most of the holdout devices used today were invented in the 19th century. One of the most successful of these devices was used by J.P. Kepplinger around 1888. The Kepplinger holdout device and many others were described in detail by the magician John Nevil Maskelyne.

The main purpose of any holdout device is to temporarily hold a card out of the game, so that the cheat may retrieve it at some later convenient time. Only one card out of play can tremendously increase the odds of winning. The cheat not only knows the identity of this card (an advantage that no other player has) and knows that it couldn't possibly be dealt to any other player, but this card also serves as if an extra card was dealt to the cheat on every round. In effect, this is as if the cheat was dealt a bonus card, so that he may decide which combination of cards he likes best and finally discard the unwanted one, only to possibly use it on the next round (or at least switch it for a better one).

== Types ==
Some of the most popular holdouts are:

- the arm pressure, sleeve holdout
- the ring holdout
- the vest holdout
- the Kepplinger holdout
- the cuff holdout
- the Braden Mammone holdout, the term is now known as "Momming-out"
