= Mechanic's grip =

Method in card cheating and card tricks

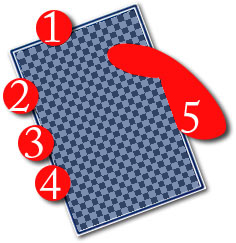
Diagram of a mechanic's grip.

Mechanic's grip, also known as dealer's grip, is a specific method of holding a deck of playing cards in one hand. It is the standard grip taught in many dealer schools around the world, and it is also widely used by magicians and card cheaters as it provides a sturdy and versatile means by which to hold the cards. Covering the deck with the hand allows the holder to manipulate the cards so as to view the top card's face (useful in poker or blackjack) or to lift and select a card without the spectator's knowledge (useful in card tricks).
