= Card sharp =

Person who uses skill and deception to win at poker or other card games

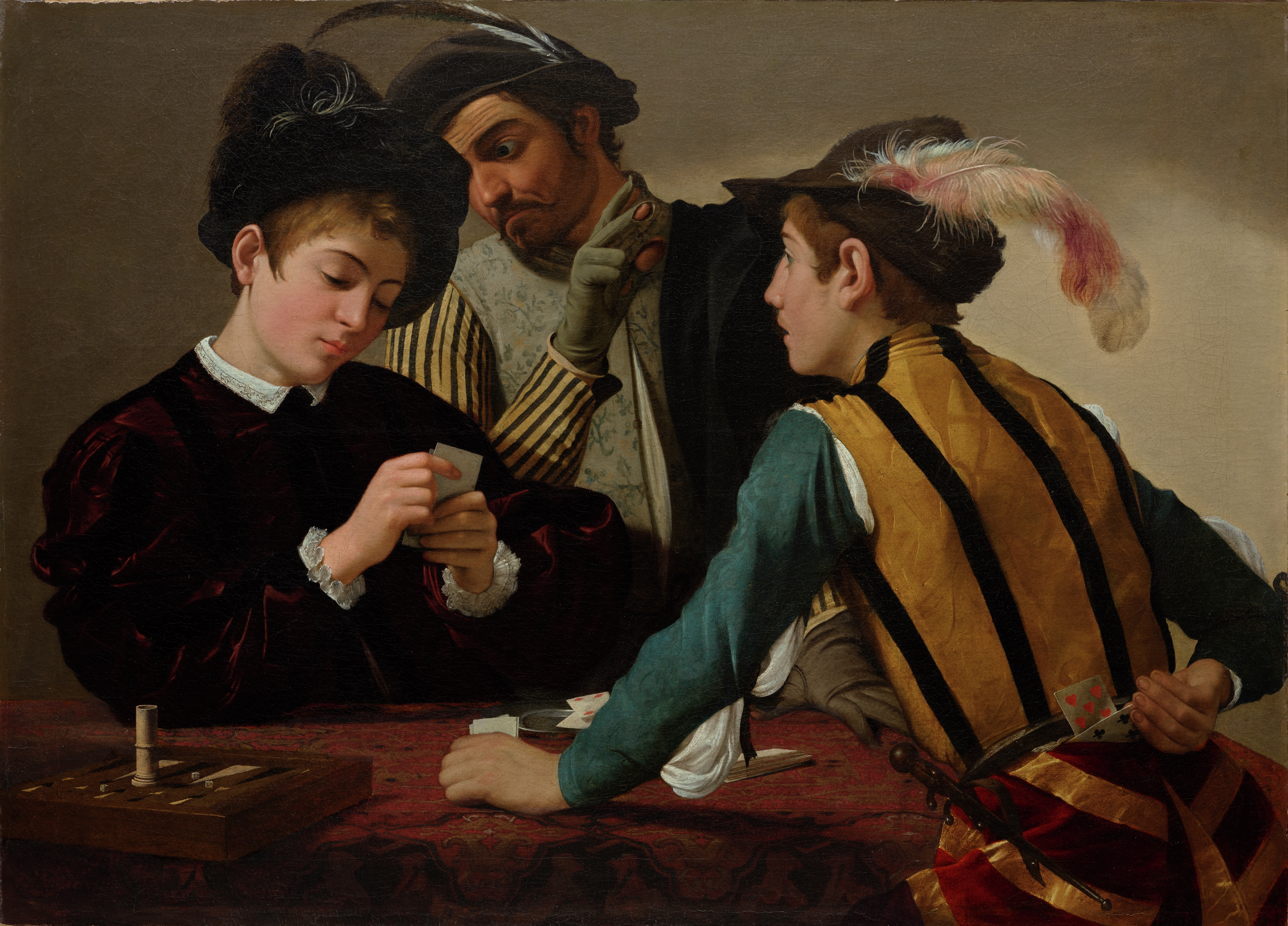
The Cardsharps (ca. 1594) by Caravaggio

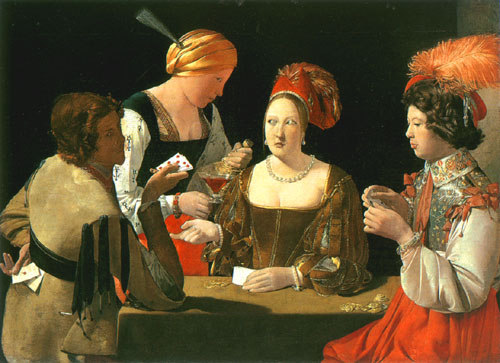
Le Tricheur à l'as de carreau (1635) by Georges de La Tour

A card sharp (also card shark, sometimes hyphenated or spelled as a single word) is a person who uses skill or deception to win at card games (such as poker). "Sharp" and "shark" spellings have varied over time and by region.

The label is not always intended as pejorative and is sometimes used to refer to practitioners of card tricks for entertainment purposes. In general usage, principally in American English and more commonly with the "shark" spelling, the term has also taken on the meaning of an expert card gambler who takes advantage of less-skilled players, also called an "advantage player," without any implication of actual cheating at cards, in much the same way that "pool shark" or "pool hustler" can (especially when used by non-players) be intended to refer to a skilled player rather than a cheater or swindler. The synonym of "card sharp," "blackleg," has pejorative connotations when used with reference to card playing and swindlers.

A card sharp or shark (by either of the gambling-related definitions) may be a "rounder" who travels, seeking out high-stakes games in which to gamble.

== Etymology and usage ==
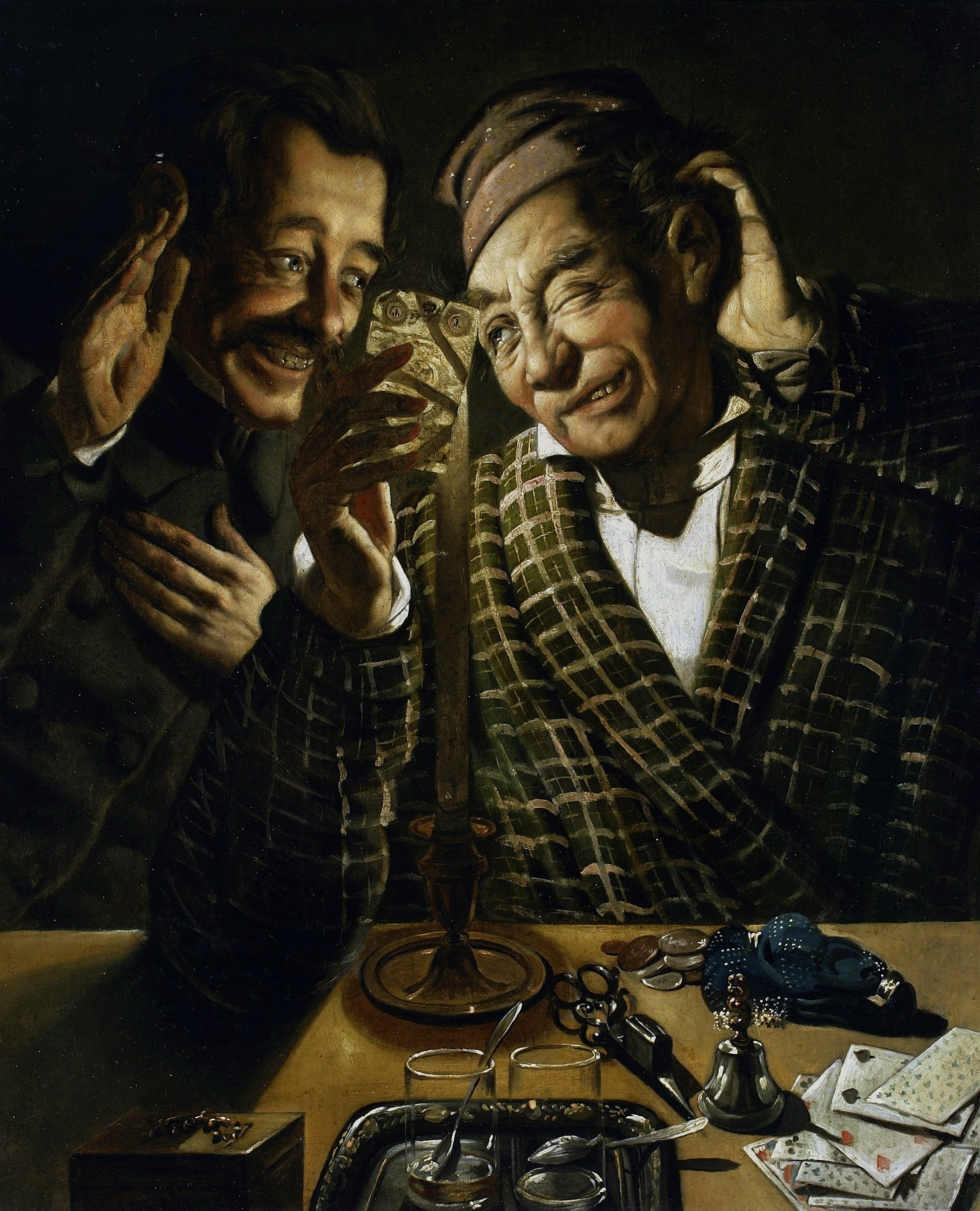
Card-sharpers by Candlelight (1845) by Feliks Pęczarski, National Museum in Warsaw

According to the prevailing etymological theory, the term "shark", originally meaning "parasite" or "one who preys upon others", derives from German Schorke or Schurke ('rogue' or 'rascal'), as did the English word "shirk[er]". "Sharp" developed in the 17th century from this meaning of "shark" (as apparently did the use of "shark" as a name for the fish), but the phrase "card sharp" predates the variant "card shark". The original connotation was negative, meaning "swindler" or "cheat", regardless of spelling, with the more positive connotations of "expert" or "skilled player" arising later, and not supplanting the negative ones. "Card sharp" and "card shark" are synonymous, although American English is somewhat, but informally, beginning to favor "shark" as a positive term versus "sharp" as a negative one. (However, not all American dictionaries agree with this, and some suggest the opposite.)

Phrasefinder puts "card sharp" (or "-sharper") as the slightly earlier usage, with an 1859 citation for "card-sharper" and "card-sharp" in both Britain and in the US, while "card-shark" is cited to 1893 in the US.

== Methods ==
Card sharps who cheat or perform tricks use methods to keep control of the order of the cards or sometimes to control one specific card. Many of these methods employ sleight of hand. Essential skills are false shuffles and false cuts that appear to mix the deck but actually leave the cards in the same order. More advanced techniques include culling (manipulating desired cards to the top or bottom of the deck), and stacking (putting desired cards in position to be dealt).

Dealing the cards can also be manipulated. Once a desired card or cards are located they can be controlled and dealt as the cheater wishes. This is called a false dealing; if a card is dealt from the bottom it is called bottom dealing and if it is second from the top it is called second dealing. Two cards could be dealt as one or the second card from the bottom could be dealt, hence the Greek deal and double deals. Dealing may also be done from the middle of the deck, known as the middle deal or center deal, but is almost always performed as a display of skill rather than actual cheating.

== In popular culture ==
=== Film ===
Card sharps are common characters in caper films, since the questionable legality of their hobby also plays well with that of their occupation. Notable examples films featuring card sharps are:

- The Lady Eve (1941)
- The Cincinnati Kid (1965)
- A Big Hand for the Little Lady (1966)
- Gambler (1971)
- The Sting (1973)
- Barry Lyndon (1975), in a scene filmed by candlelight, Barry's mentor "The Chevalier" is shown palming cards from his sleeve to cheat at faro
- The Great Gambler (1979)
- Indiana Jones and the Temple of Doom; Short Round accused the title character of being a card sharp.
- Maverick (1994)
- Lock, Stock and Two Smoking Barrels (1998)
- Rounders (1998)
- Shade (2003)
- The Prestige (2006), world-renowned card sharp Ricky Jay advised the actors and played a supporting role
- Tazza: The High Rollers (2006)
- 21 (2008)
- Teen Patti (The three cards) (2009)

=== Television ===
- Stage magician and actor Harry Anderson (of Night Court fame) made several appearances on Cheers as card sharp "Harry the Hat".
- In the Friends episode "The One with Russ", Ross debates with his doppelgänger Russ about the correctness of the term "card shark" vs. "card sharp".
- The Homicide: Life on the Street episode "Just an Old-fashioned Love Song", features the homicide investigation of a woman who made a living as a card sharp, but whose gambling on other games sank her into substantial debt, with dire consequences for herself and her extended family.
- On Mission: Impossible, members of the Impossible Missions Force (particularly Rollin Hand), would often use their card sharp skills as part of a mission.
- On Hogan's Heroes, Cpl. Peter Newkirk (Richard Dawson) served as the group's card sharp, in addition to being a sleight-of-hand expert, magician, forger, safe-cracker, lock-picker, pick-pocket, voice impersonator, and all-around conman.
- In Prison Break, the character Theodore "T-Bag" Bagwell is an expert card sharp, who says, "there are maybe five people in this country who can do what I do with a deck of cards." T-Bag uses this skill successfully in season 1, episode 18, "Bluff".
- Sanford and Son featured an episode wherein card sharps defeated Lamont at poker. Fred was able to defeat the card sharps and win Lamont's money back, in season 2, episode 6, aired October 27, 1972.
- In the Japanese anime Cowboy Bebop, characters Fay Valentine and Spike Spiegel both exhibit card sharping skills, usually at the expense of their partner, Jet Black.
- In the Arrow episode "The Undertaking", Felicity Smoak poses as a card sharp, so that she and Oliver can infiltrate a private casino to extort information about Walter Steele.
- The title character in Batman: The Animated Series is skilled at sleight-of-hand tricks which he learned them from Giovanni Zatara, Zatanna Zatara's father. In "Second Chance" he palms Two-Face's coin and replaces it with a trick one that will only land on its edge to paralyze him with indecision, and in "Joker's Wild" he swaps out cards in a hand of blackjack as he's looking for the Joker who has taken the dealer's place at the table.
- In Downton Abbey series 4, episode 3, Edith's love interest Mr. Gregson expresses his pleasure in beating a "card sharp", Mr Sampson, who was a card sharp of the first degree.
- In the Person of Interest episode "All In", Harold Finch and John Reese are given information about a former card sharp who is forced into being a mule for a casino owner and drug dealer by picking up money from a dead drop and intentionally losing it in his casino.
- In the British reality TV show The Real Hustle, co-host Paul Wilson is an expert card mechanic who uses his skills to demonstrate scams.
- In I Dream of Jeannie episode "One Genie Beats Four of a Kind", Jeannie helping Tony and Roger at their poker games leads others, including Dr. Bellows and a fellow astronaut, to believe they are card sharps. To compound things, the other astronaut is actually a mobster in disguise who intends to rub out Roger (whom he suspects is the real card sharp), until Jeannie turns the tables on him.
- The title of the American game show Card Sharks is a play on the phrase "card sharps".
- In the Star Trek: The Next Generation episode Time's Arrow, Data showed talents with being a card sharp when using it to get money while stranded in 19th-century San Francisco during 1893.

=== Video games ===
- The Kingdom Hearts character Luxord is a gambler who uses cards in the majority of his attacks.
- In League of Legends, the champion Twisted Fate is a card sharp. His attacks consist of throwing magical cards and using his skills to earn extra gold.
- The 2022 Devolver Digital title, Card Shark, centers on the exploits of the player-controlled titular character, operating various card gambling cons in 18th-century France.
- In Balatro, Card Sharp is a Joker (modifier card) that provides a 3x multiplier to part of the player's score if the same poker hand had already been played in the same round.
- In Batman: Arkham City, Victor Zsasz mentions how he faced card sharps, including the Penguin, who beat him by cheating.

== See also ==
- Cardistry
- History of cardistry
