= Max Holden =

Max Holden may refer to:

- Max Holden (cricketer) (born 1997), English cricketer
- Max Holden (magician) (1884–1949), Scottish-born American vaudeville performer
- Max Holden (One Life to Live), a fictional character from the American soap opera One Life to Live
