= Tabarin (disambiguation) =

Tabarin was the street name assumed by the most famous of the Parisian street charlatans, Anthoine Girard.

Tabarin or Bel Tabarin may also refer to:

- Bal Tabarin (Paris), a historic Paris nightclub
- Bimbo's 365 Club, a San Francisco entertainment venue formerly known as Bal Tabarin
- Operation Tabarin, the codename under which the British Antarctic Survey originated in 1944
- Tabarin Peninsula in Antarctica, named after the operation

== Media ==
- Bal Tabarin (film), a 1952 film featuring Argentina Brunetti
- Tabarin, an 1885 opera by Émile Pessard
- "Tabarin", a 1951 song by The Hollywood Flames
- Tabarin (film), a 1958 film starring Sylvia Lopez
