= Peter Warlock (magician) =

British magician (1904–1995)

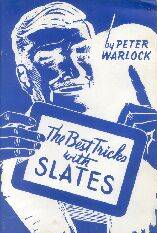
- Born: Alec William Bell; 30 October 1904; England
- Died: 17 December 1995 (aged 91)
- Occupations: Magician, publisher
- Known for: magic
- Family: Elizabeth Warlock (daughter)

Peter Warlock (born Alec William Bell; 30 October 1904 – 17 December 1995) was a semi-professional magician and publisher of the British magic magazines "Pentagram" (1946–59) and the "New Pentagram" (1969–89).

== Career ==
In 1960, he became the honorary president of the Paisley Magic Circle. Peter Warlock was also asked to accept the Honorary Life Presidency of the Blackpool Magic Club after the death of the initial holder of that position, Edward Victor, which he did. He was followed in that distinction by Ken Dodd O.B.E.

=== Inventions ===
- Self Contained Milk Pitcher
- Ringcord
- Out of the Loop
- Giant Size Triple Tubes
- Silk Filter
- Adhesive Glass
- Cream of the Jest
- Atomic Silk
- Ring and Rope Release

=== Published works ===
- The Best Tricks With Slates (1942)
- Plans for Deception (1942)
- Patterns for Psychics (1947)
- Peter Warlock's Book of Magic (1956)
- Warlock's Way (1966)
- The Magic of Pavel (1981)
- P.T. Selbit: Magical Innovator (with Eric Lewis; 1989)
- Buatier de Kolta: Genius of Illusion (1993)

== Family life ==
He is the father of Elizabeth Warlock, who started performing as a stage magician at the age of 16 and who, in 2005, wrote the book One Hundred by Warlock about Peter Warlock's work.

== See also ==
- List of magicians
- Card magic
