= Shadow =

Area where light is blocked by an object

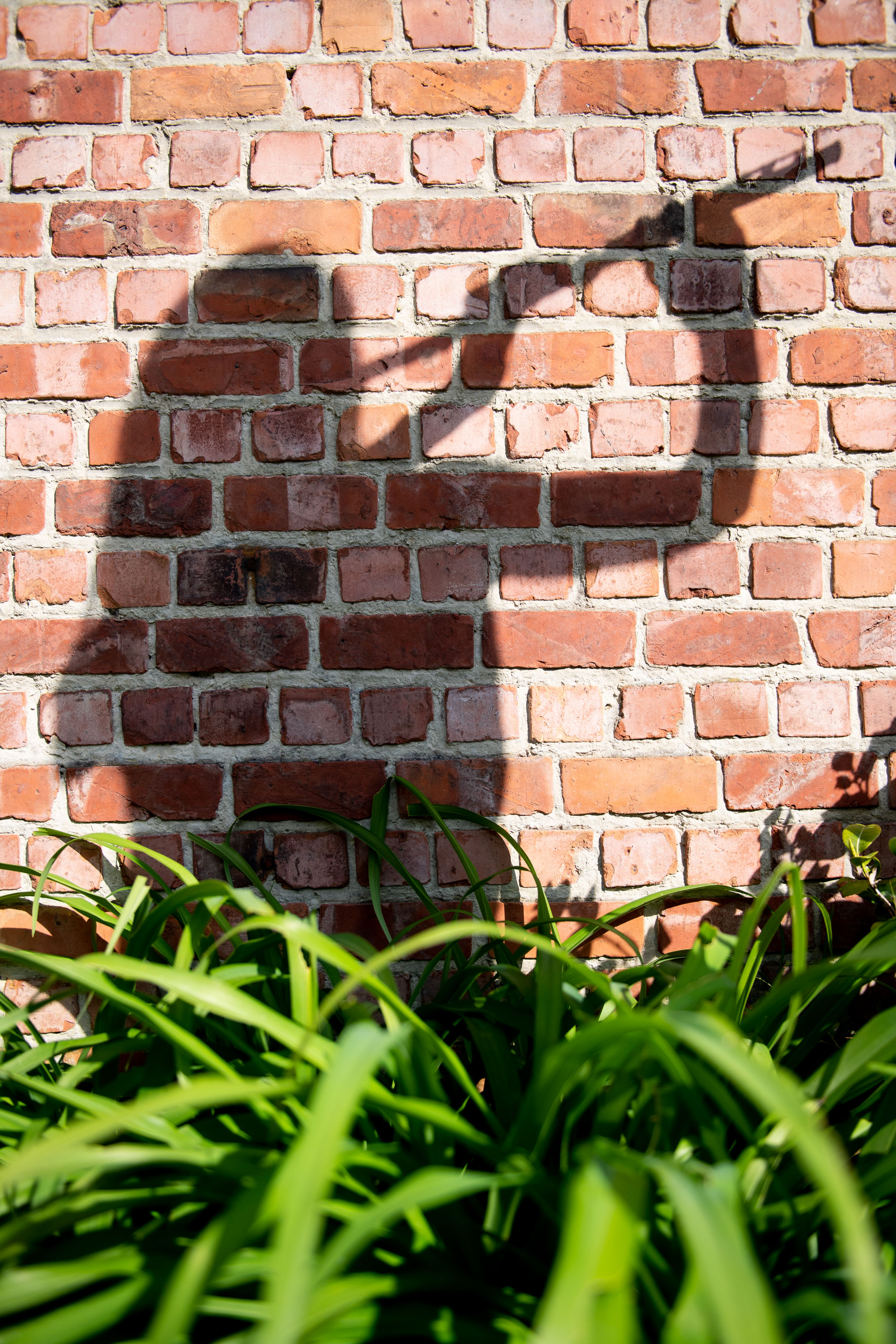
The shadow of a musician cast onto a brick wall

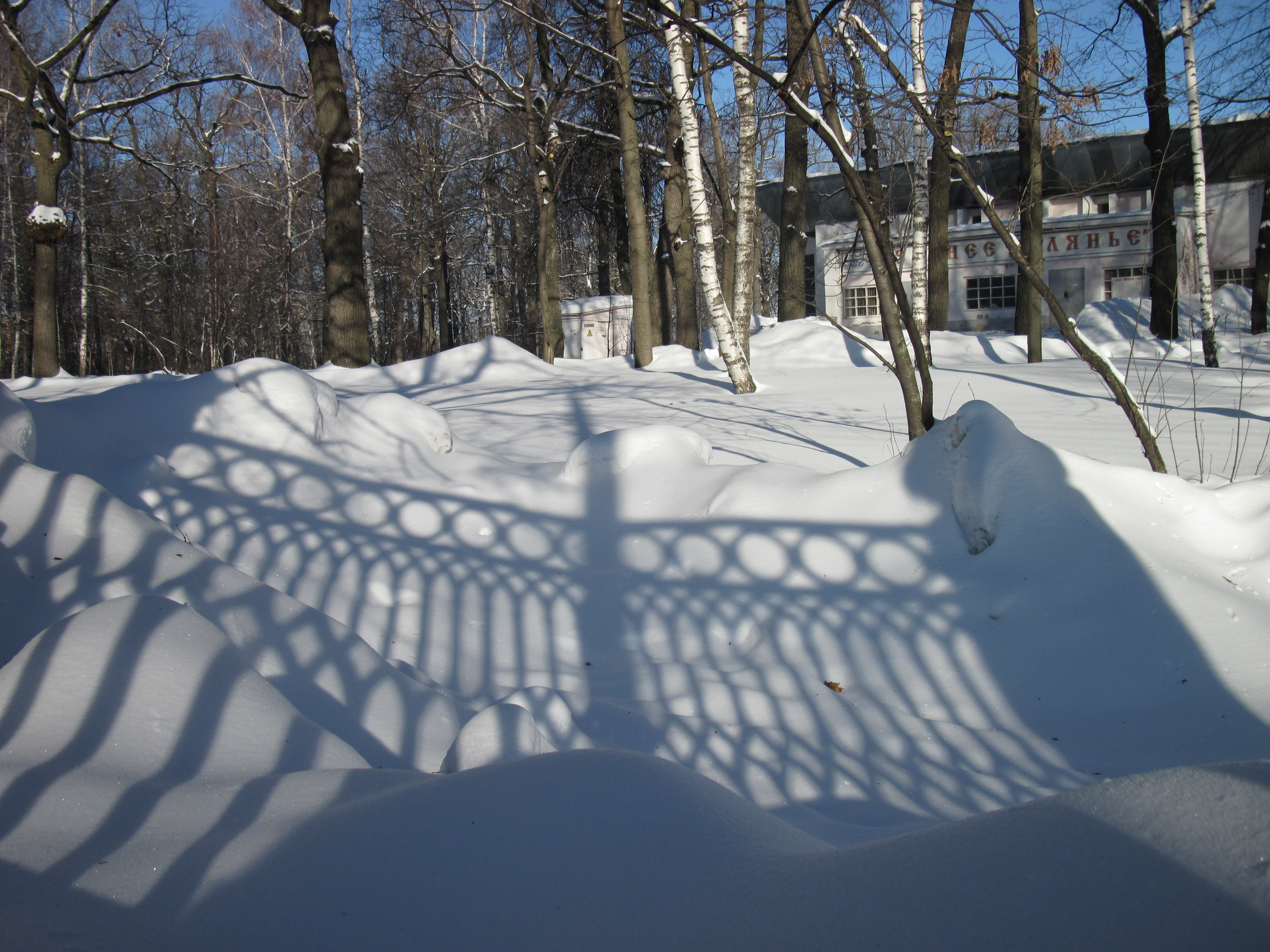
Park fence shadow is distorted by an uneven snow surface.

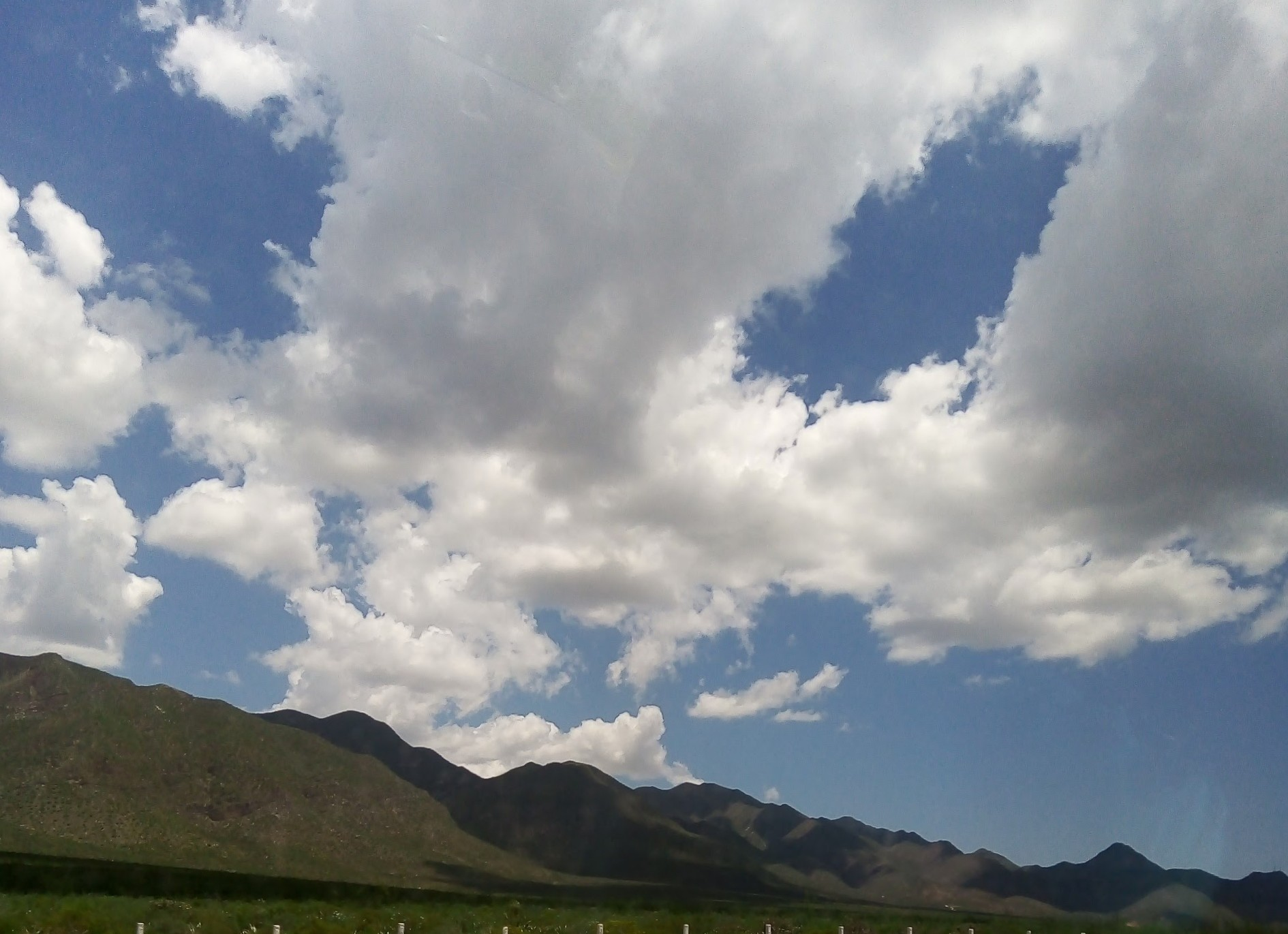
Shadows from cumulus clouds thick enough to block sunlight

A shadow is a dark area on a surface where light from a light source is blocked by an object. In contrast, shade occupies the three-dimensional volume behind an object with light in front of it. The cross-section of a shadow is a two-dimensional silhouette, or a reverse projection of the object blocking the light.

== Point and non-point light sources ==
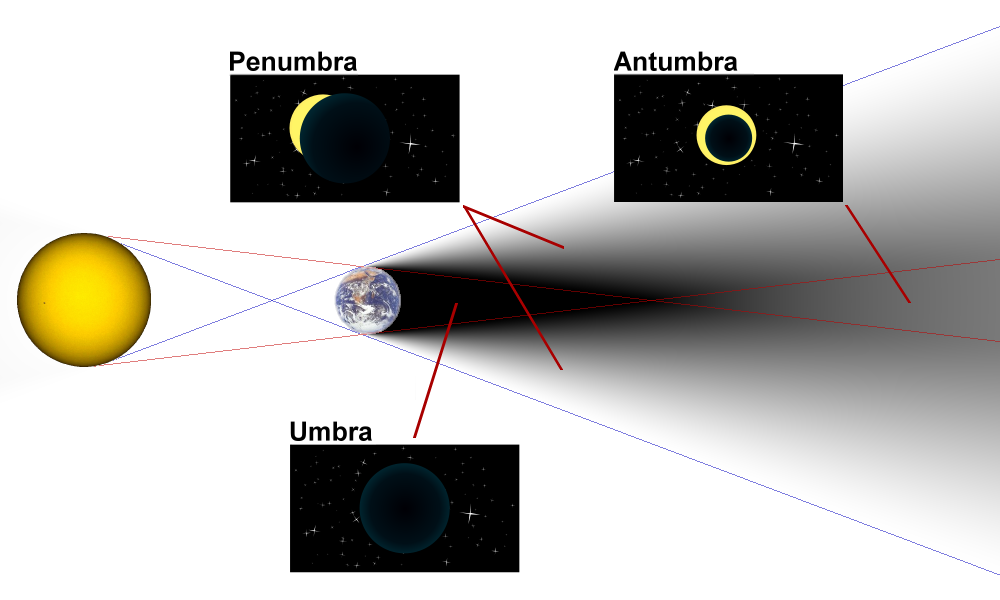
Umbra, penumbra and antumbra

A point source of light casts only a simple shadow, called an "umbra". For a non-point or "extended" source of light, the shadow is divided into the umbra, penumbra, and antumbra. The wider the light source, the more blurred the shadow becomes. If two penumbras overlap, the shadows appear to attract and merge. This is known as the shadow blister effect.

The outlines of the shadow zones can be found by tracing the rays of light emitted by the outermost regions of the extended light source. The umbra region does not receive any direct light from any part of the light source and is the darkest. A viewer located in the umbra region cannot directly see any part of the light source.

By contrast, the penumbra is illuminated by some parts of the light source, giving it an intermediate level of light intensity. A viewer located in the penumbra region will see the light source, but it is partially blocked by the object casting the shadow.

If there is more than one light source, there will be several shadows, with the overlapping parts darker, and various combinations of brightnesses or even colors. The more diffuse the lighting is, the softer and more indistinct the shadow outlines become until they disappear. The lighting of an overcast sky produces few visible shadows.

The absence of diffusing atmospheric effects in the vacuum of outer space produces shadows that are stark and sharply delineated by high-contrast boundaries between light and dark.

For a person or object touching the surface where the shadow is projected (e.g. a person standing on the ground, or a pole in the ground) the shadows converge at the point of contact.

A shadow shows, apart from distortion, the same image as the silhouette when looking at the object from the sun-side, hence the mirror image of the silhouette seen from the other side.

== Astronomy ==
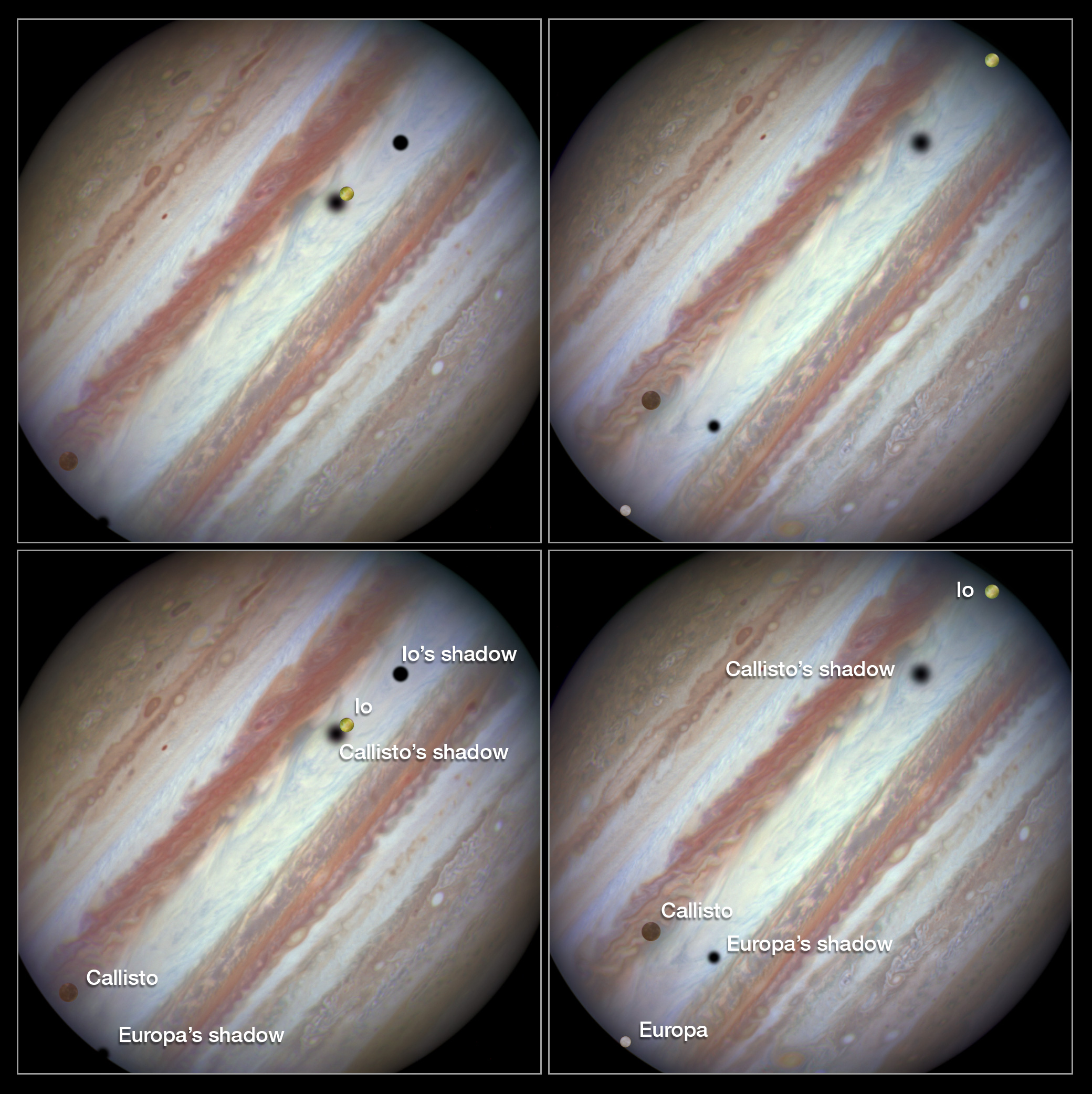
Three moons (Callisto, Europa and Io) and their shadows parade across Jupiter.

The names umbra, penumbra and antumbra are often used for the shadows cast by astronomical objects, though they are sometimes used to describe levels of darkness, such as in sunspots. An astronomical object casts human-visible shadows when its apparent magnitude is equal or lower than -4. The only astronomical objects able to project visible shadows onto Earth are the Sun, the Moon, and in the right conditions, Venus or Jupiter. Night is caused by the hemisphere of a planet facing its orbital star blocking its sunlight.

A shadow cast by the Earth onto the Moon is a lunar eclipse. Conversely, a shadow cast by the Moon onto the Earth is a solar eclipse.

== Daytime variation ==
The sun casts shadows that change dramatically through the day. The length of a shadow cast on the ground is proportional to the cotangent of the sun's elevation angle—its angle θ relative to the horizon. Near sunrise and sunset, when θ = 0° and cot(θ) = ∞, shadows can be extremely long. If the sun passes directly overhead (only possible in locations between the Tropics of Cancer and Capricorn), then θ = 90°, cot(θ) = 0, and shadows are cast directly underneath objects.

Such variations have long aided travellers during their travels, especially in barren regions such as the Arabian Desert.

== Propagation speed ==
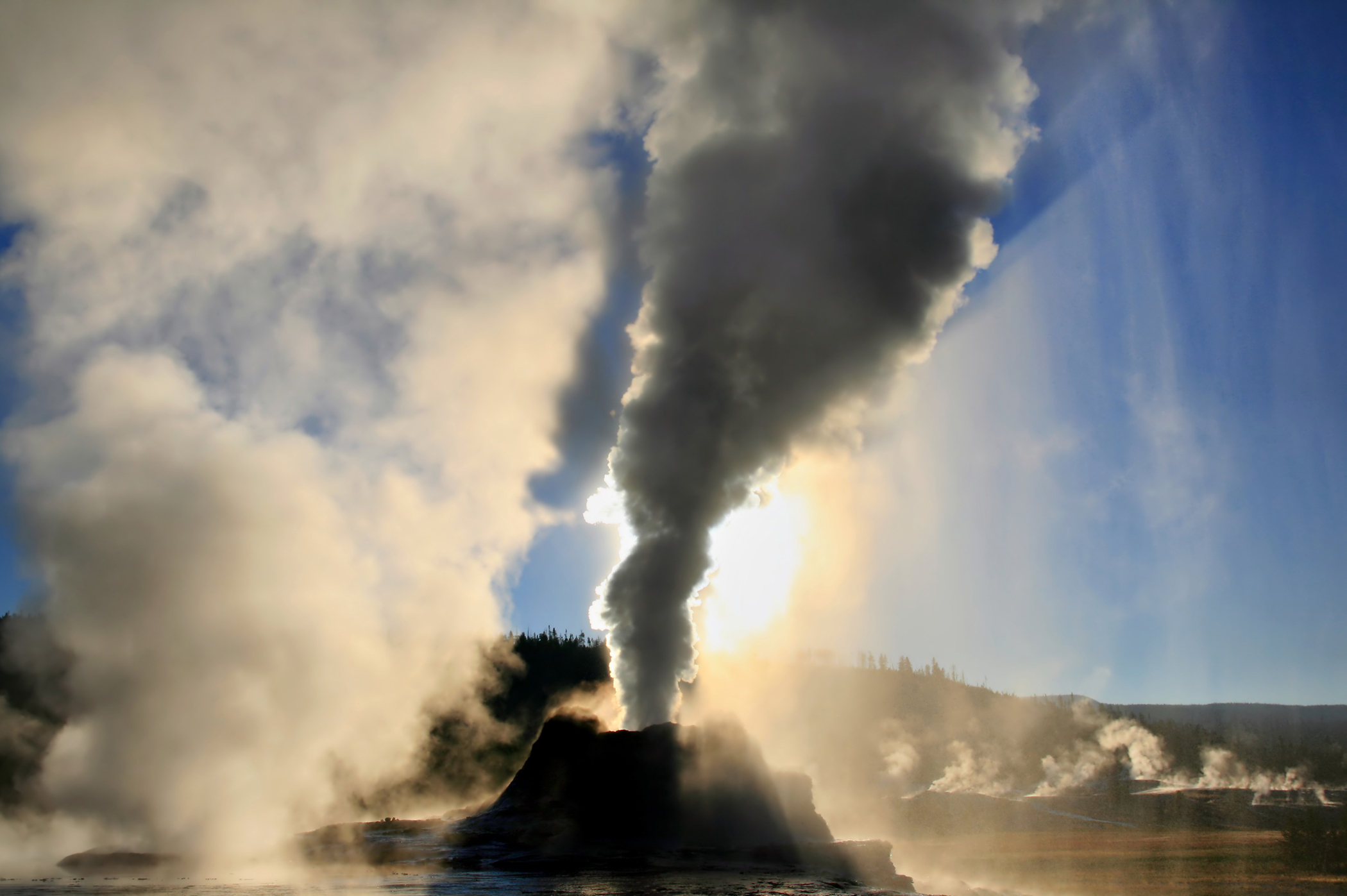
Steam phase eruption of Castle Geyser in Yellowstone National Park casts a shadow on its own steam. Crepuscular rays are also visible.

The farther the distance from the object blocking the light to the surface of projection, the larger the silhouette (they are considered proportional). Also, if the object is moving, the shadow cast by the object will project an image with dimensions (length) expanding proportionally faster than the object's own rate of movement. The increase of size and movement is also true if the distance between the object of interference and the light source are closer. Eventually, this speed may exceed the speed of light.; however, this does not violate special relativity as shadows do not carry any information or momentum.

Although the edge of a shadow appears to "move" along a wall, in actuality the increase of a shadow's length is part of a new projection that propagates at the speed of light from the object of interference. Since there is no actual communication between points in a shadow (except for reflection or interference of light, at the speed of light), a shadow that projects over a surface of large distances (light years) cannot convey information between those distances with the shadow's edge.

== Color ==
Visual artists are usually very aware of colored light emitted or reflected from several sources, which can generate complex multicolored shadows. Chiaroscuro, sfumato, and silhouette are examples of artistic techniques which make deliberate use of shadow effects.

During the daytime, a shadow cast by an opaque object illuminated by sunlight has a bluish tinge. This happens because of Rayleigh scattering, the same property that causes the sky to appear blue. The opaque object is able to block the light of the sun, but not the ambient light of the sky which is blue as the atmospheric molecules scatter blue light more effectively. As a result, the shadow appears bluish.

== Dimension ==
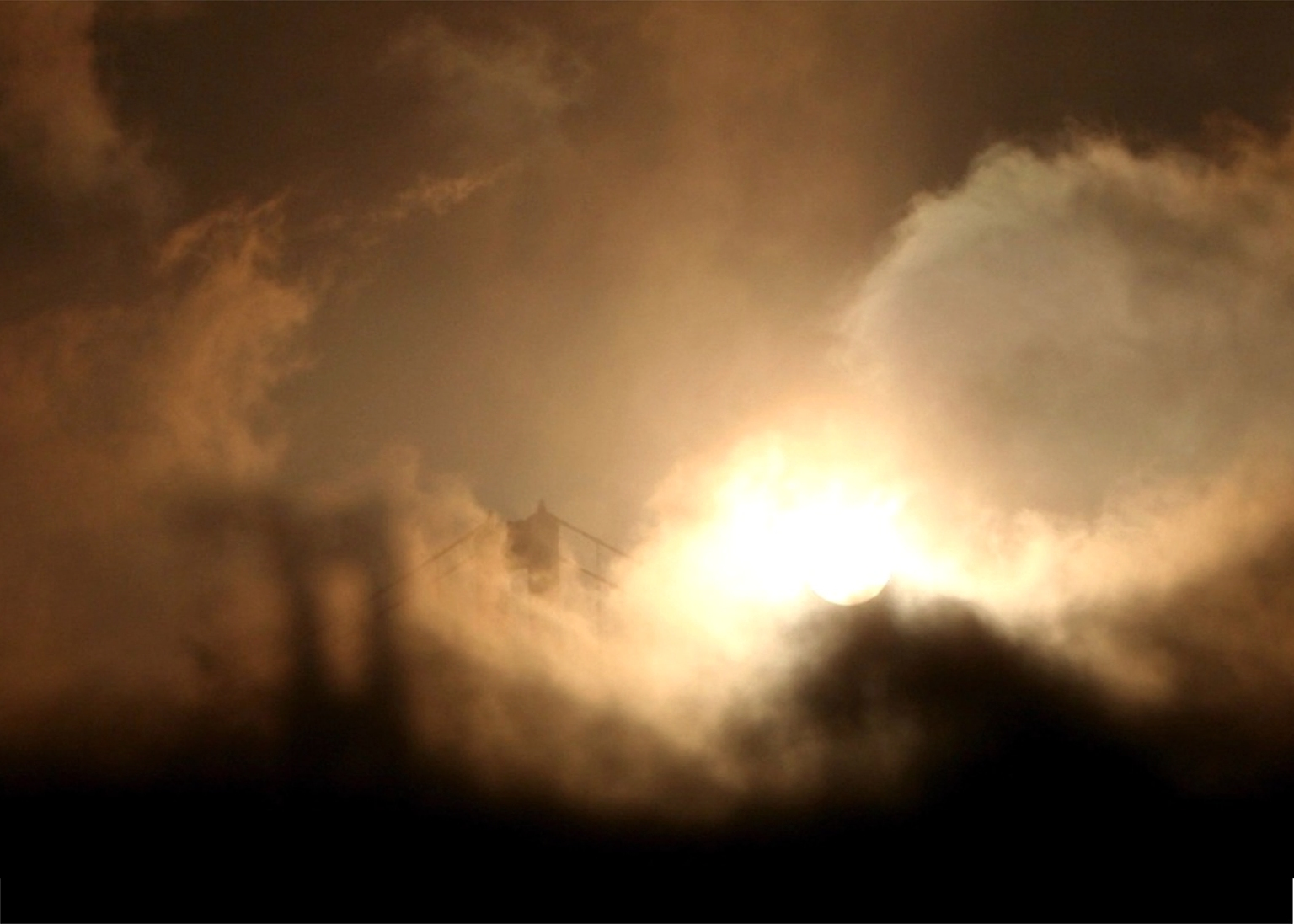
Fog shadow of the south tower of the Golden Gate Bridge

A shadow occupies a three-dimensional volume of space, but this is usually not visible until it projects onto a reflective surface. A light fog, mist, or dust cloud can reveal the 3D presence of volumetric patterns in light and shadow.

Fog shadows may look odd to viewers who are not used to seeing shadows in three dimensions. A thin fog is just dense enough to be illuminated by the light that passes through the gaps in a structure or in a tree. As a result, the path of an object's shadow through the fog becomes visible as a darkened volume. In a sense, these shadow lanes are the inverse of crepuscular rays caused by beams of light; they are caused by the shadows of solid objects.

Theatrical fog and strong beams of light are sometimes used by lighting designers and visual artists who seek to highlight three-dimensional aspects of their work.

== Inversion ==
Oftentimes shadows of chain-linked fences and other such objects become inverted (light and dark areas are swapped) as they get farther from the object. A chain-link fence shadow will start with light diamonds and shadow outlines when it is touching the fence, but it will gradually blur. Eventually, if the fence is tall enough, the light pattern will go to shadow diamonds and light outlines.

== Visual arts ==
=== Photography ===
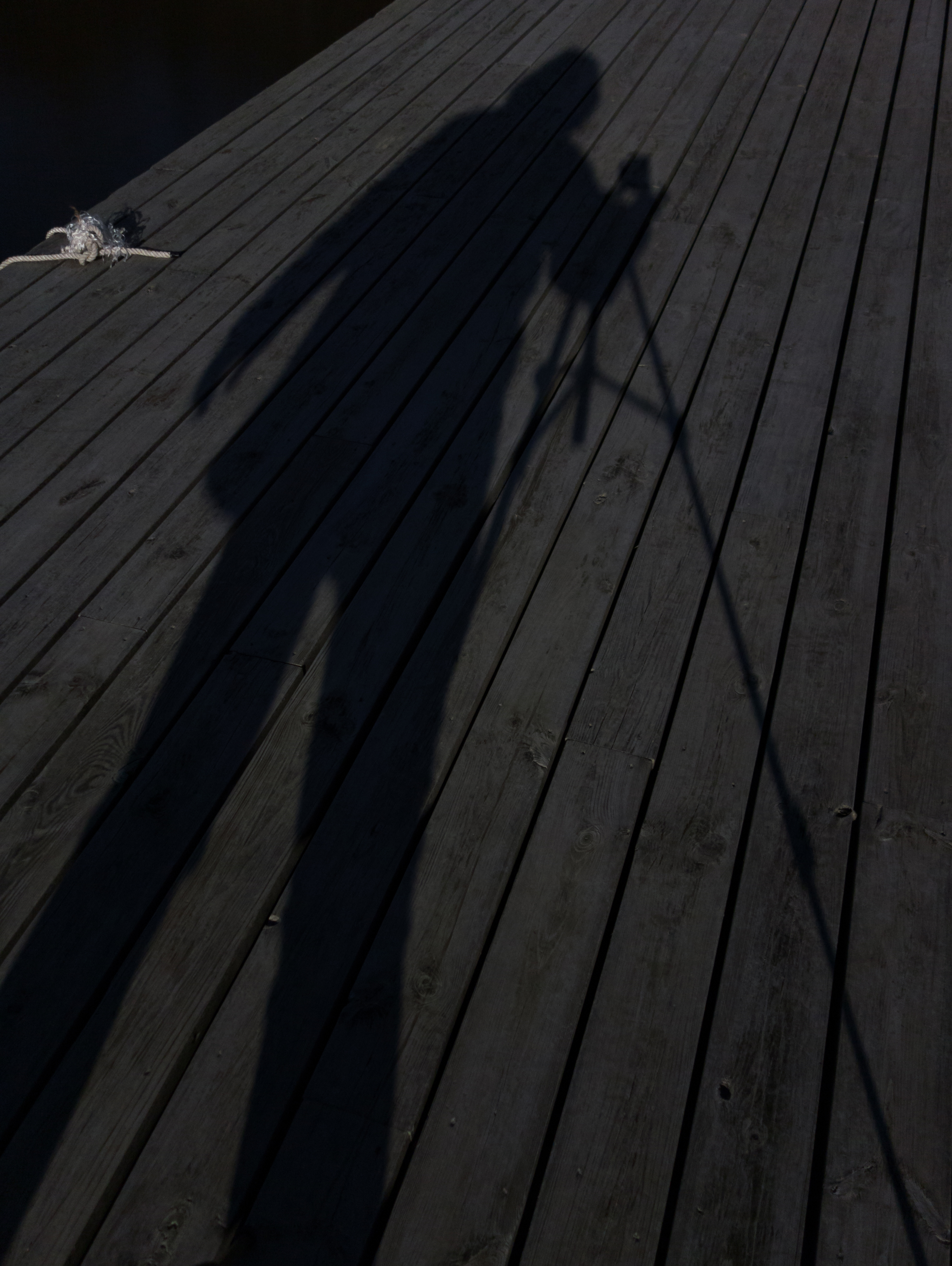
Moonlight shadow of a photographer

In photography, which is essentially recording patterns of light, shade, and color, "highlights" and "shadows" are the brightest and darkest parts, respectively, of a scene or image. Photographic exposure must be adjusted (unless special effects are wanted) to allow the film or sensor, which has limited dynamic range, to record detail in the highlights without them being washed out, and in the shadows without their becoming undifferentiated black areas.

On satellite imagery and aerial photographs, taken vertically, tall buildings can be recognized as such by their long shadows (if the photographs are not taken in the tropics around noon), while these also show more of the shape of these buildings.

=== Graphic arts ===
Pedagogy in the graphic arts (i.e. drawing, painting) distinguishes two types of shadows: form shadows occur on surfaces facing away from a light source, while cast shadows are caused by one object blocking direct light from another. Darker-than-average areas in form and cast shadows, respectively called core shadows and occlusion shadows, sometimes occur due to the effects of reflected light.

=== Shadow wall ===
A shadow wall is created when a light flashes upon a person or object in front of a phosphorescent screen which temporarily captures the shadow. The screen or wall is painted with a glow-in-the-dark product that contains phosphorescent compounds. These shadow walls are exhibits at some science museums.

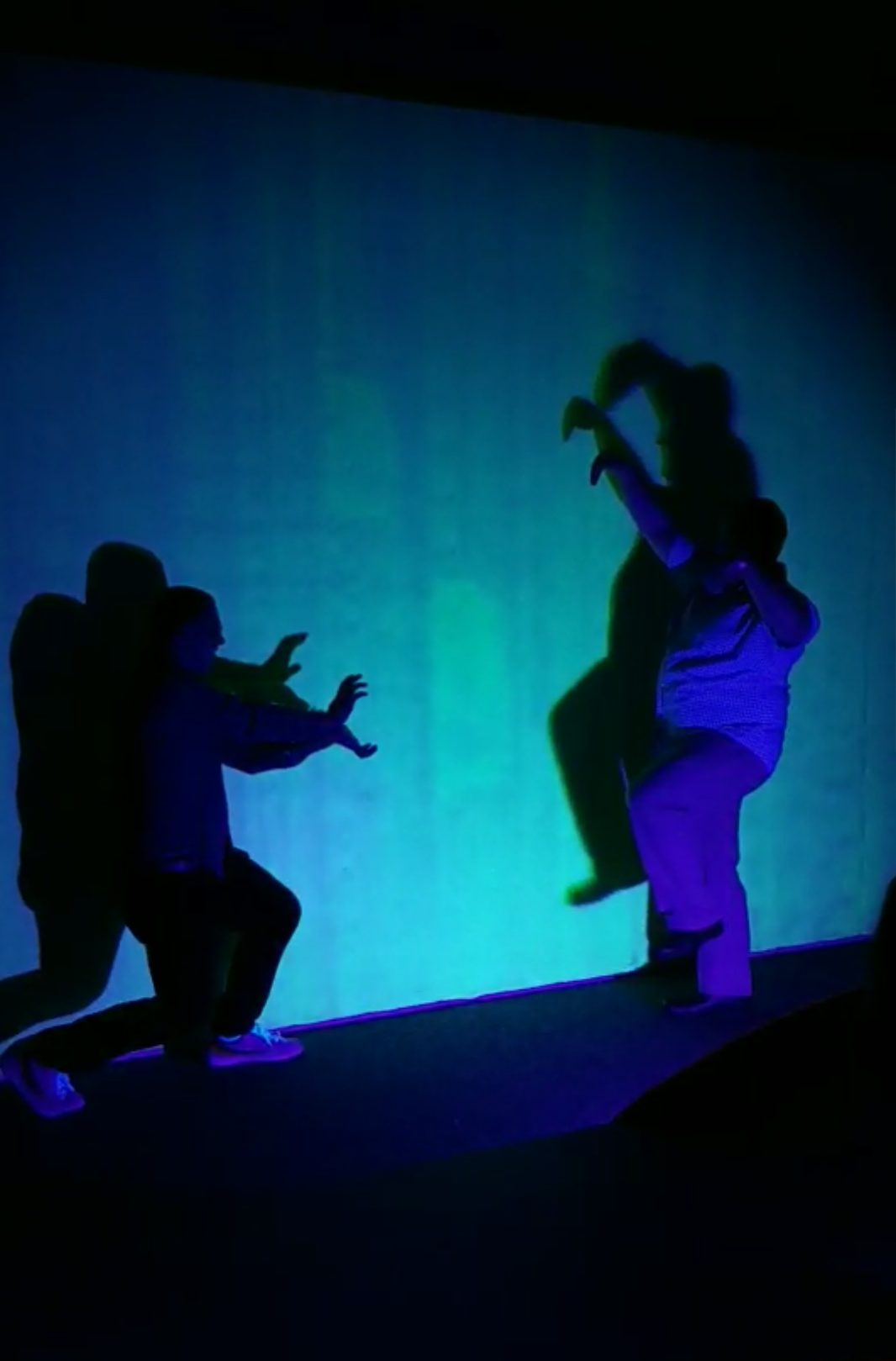
A phosphorescent wall is being illuminated; shadows are present.

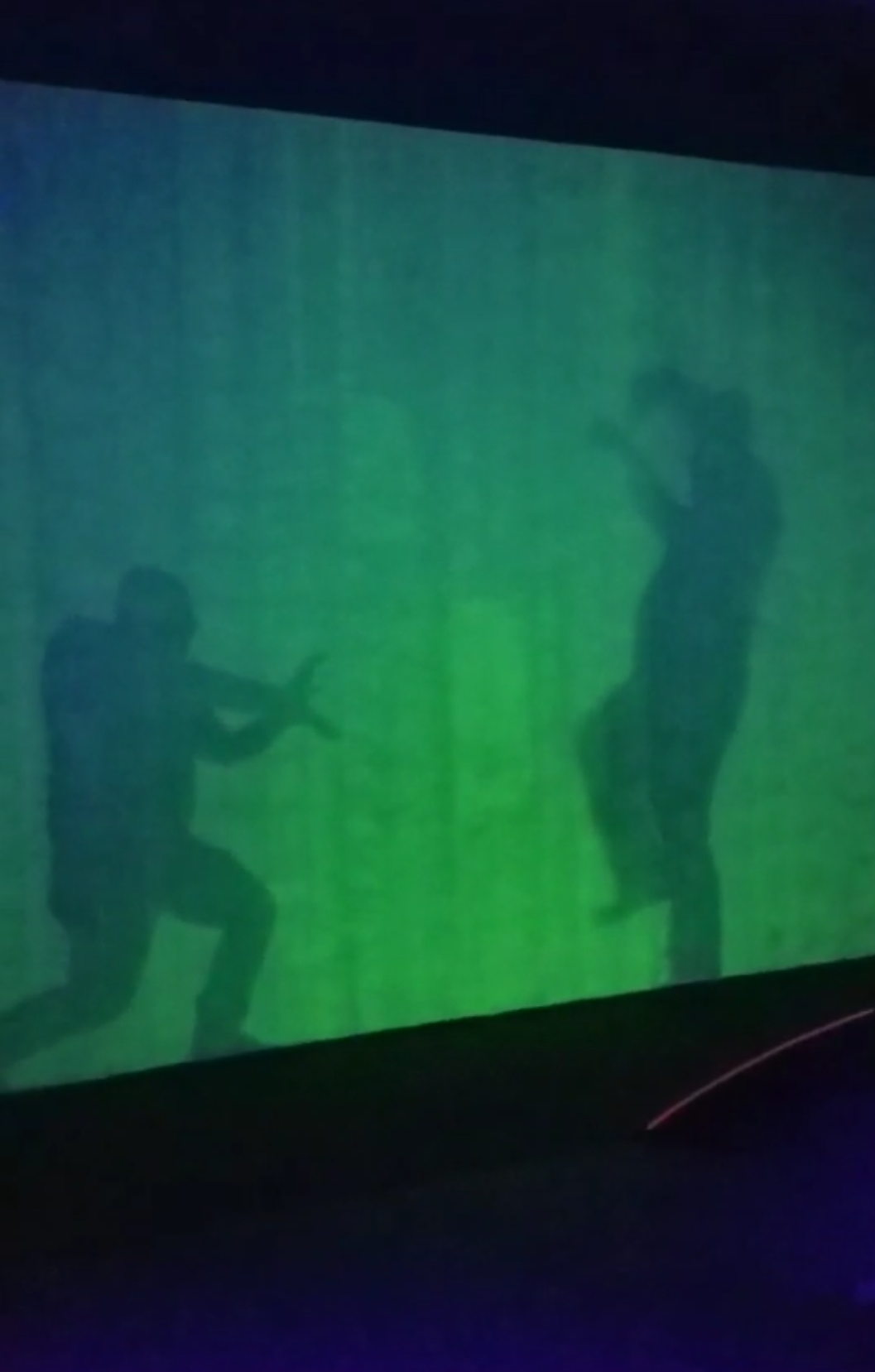
After removing the light source, shadows are visible on the wall.

== Analogous concepts ==
Shadow as a term is often used for any occlusion or blockage, not just those with respect to light. For example, a rain shadow is a dry area, which with respect to the prevailing wind direction, is beyond a mountain range; the elevated terrain impedes rainclouds from entering the dry zone. An acoustic shadow occurs when a direct sound has been blocked or diverted around a given area.

== Cultural aspects ==
Shadows often appear in mythical or cultural contexts. Sometimes in a malevolent light, other times not. An unattended shade was thought by some cultures to be similar to that of a ghost. The name for the fear of shadows is "sciophobia" or "sciaphobia".

Chhaya is the Hindu goddess of shadows.

In heraldry, when a charge is supposedly shown "in the shadow" (the appearance is of the charge merely being outlined in a neutral tint rather than being of one or more tinctures different from the field on which it is placed), it is technically described as "umbrated". Supposedly, only a limited number of specific charges can be so depicted.

Shadows are often linked with darkness and evil; in common folklore, like shadows who come to life, are often evil beings trying to control the people they reflect.

Ancient Egyptians surmised that a shadow, which they called šwt (shut), contains something of the person it represents because it is always present. Through this association, statues of people and deities were sometimes referred to as shadows.

In Islam, shadows are a sign of submission to God. The Quran emphasizes that everything in the heavens and the earth, including shadows, prostrates to the Almighty in awe and obedience: "Do they not see how everything that Allah has created casts its shadow, inclining to the right and to the left, prostrating to Allah while they are humble?" (Quran 16:48). Similarly, the Quran states, "And to Allah prostrates whoever is within the heavens and the earth, willingly or by compulsion, and their shadows [as well] in the mornings and the afternoons" (Quran 13:15). Shadows, in this context, are a testament to the divine order and unity of creation.

In a commentary to The Egyptian Book of the Dead (BD), Egyptologist Ogden Goelet, Jr. discusses the forms of the shadow: "In many BD papyri and tombs the deceased is depicted emerging from the tomb by day in shadow form, a thin, black, featureless silhouette of a person. The person in this form is, as we would put it, a mere shadow of his former existence, yet nonetheless still existing. Another form the shadow assumes in the BD, especially in connection with gods, is an ostrich-feather sun-shade, an object which would create a shadow."

== Energy generating ==
Scientists from the National University of Singapore presented a shadow-effect energy generator (SEG), which consists of cells of gold deposited on a silicon wafer attached on a plastic film. The generator has a power density of 0.14 μW cm^{−2} under indoor conditions (0.001 sun).

== Gallery ==
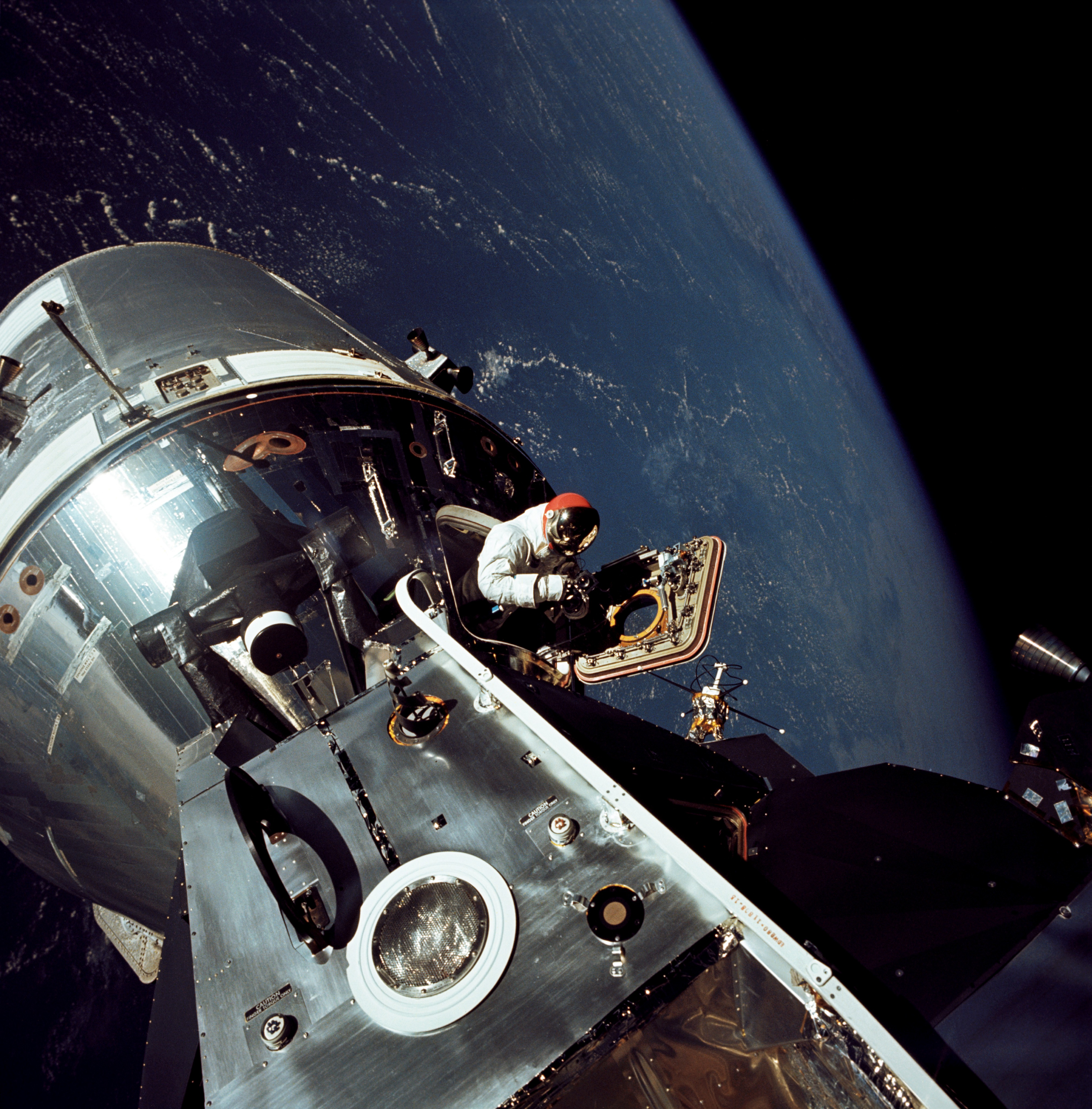
Non-diffuse lighting in outer space causes deep shadows

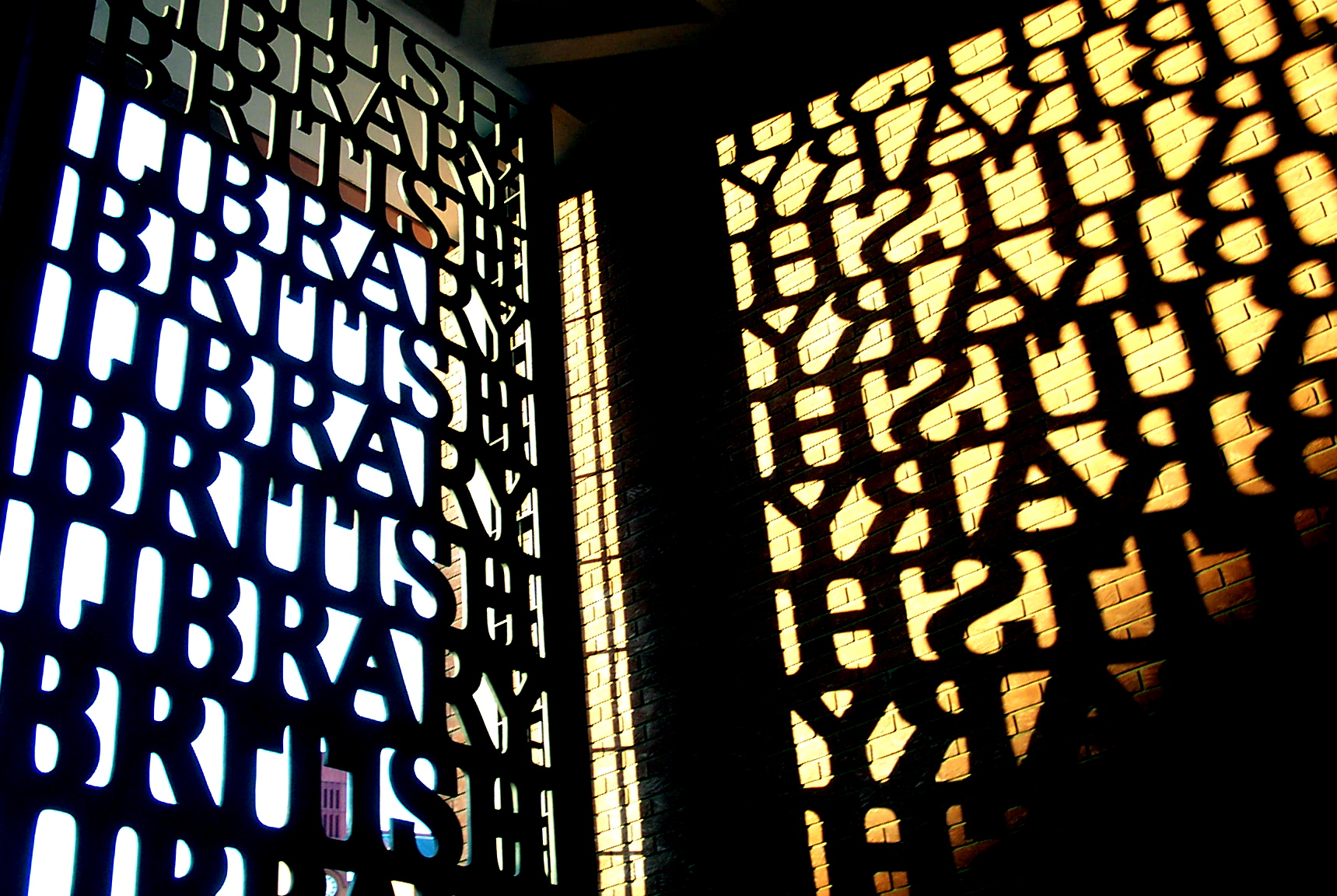
Reversed text in shadow

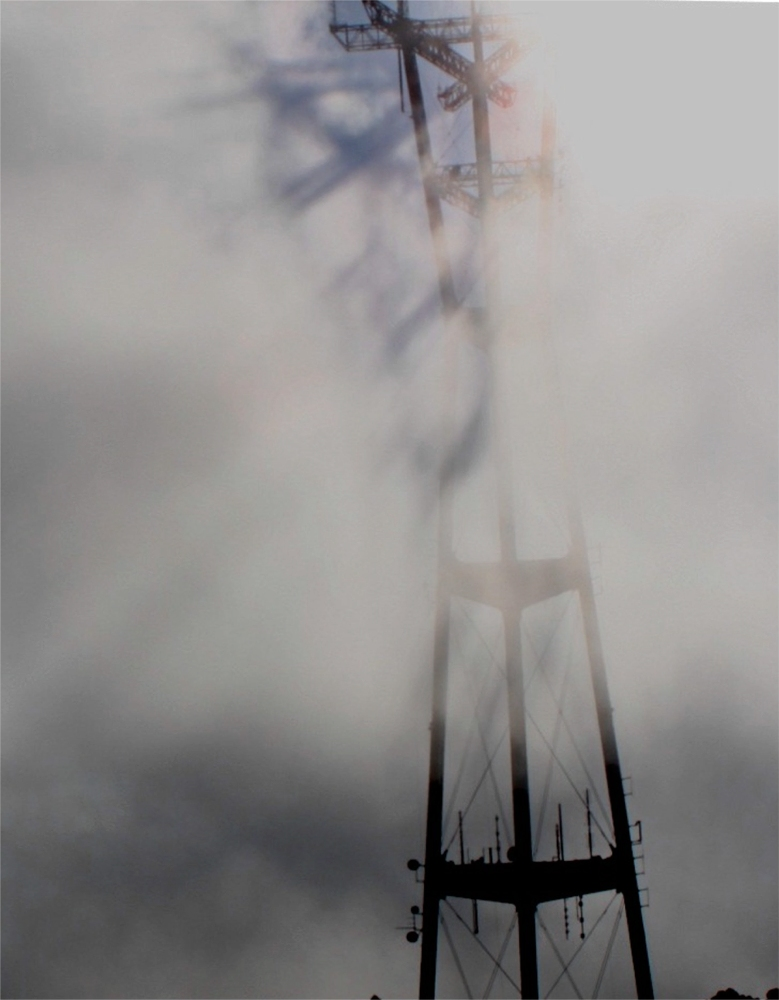
Sutro Tower casts a 3D fog shadow.

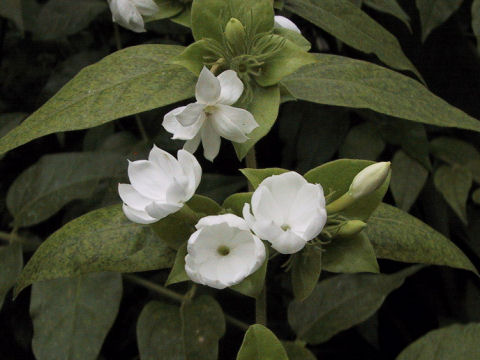
This photo of jasmine flowers has only soft shadows cast by diffused light.

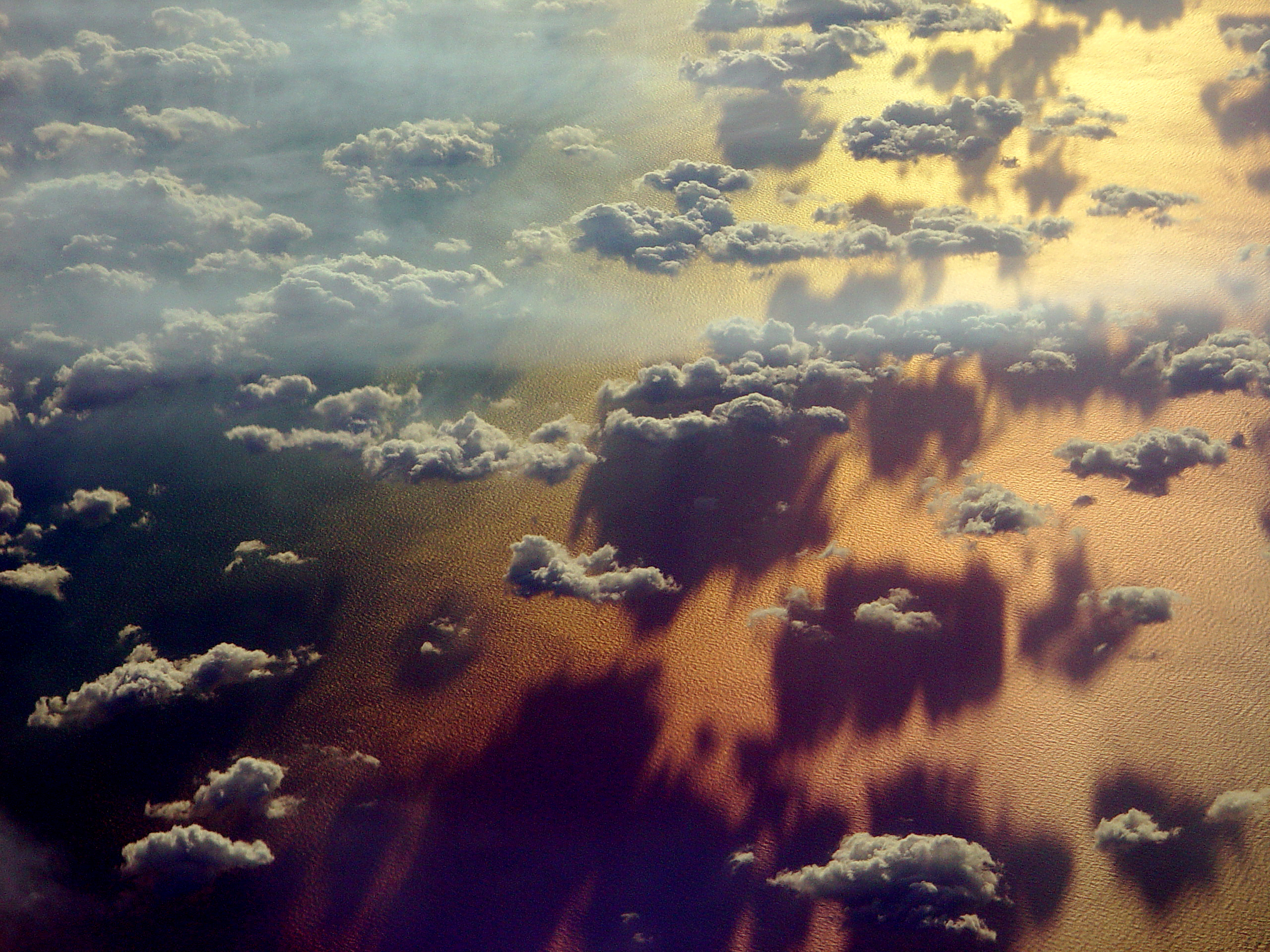
Clouds, and shadows over the Mediterranean Sea

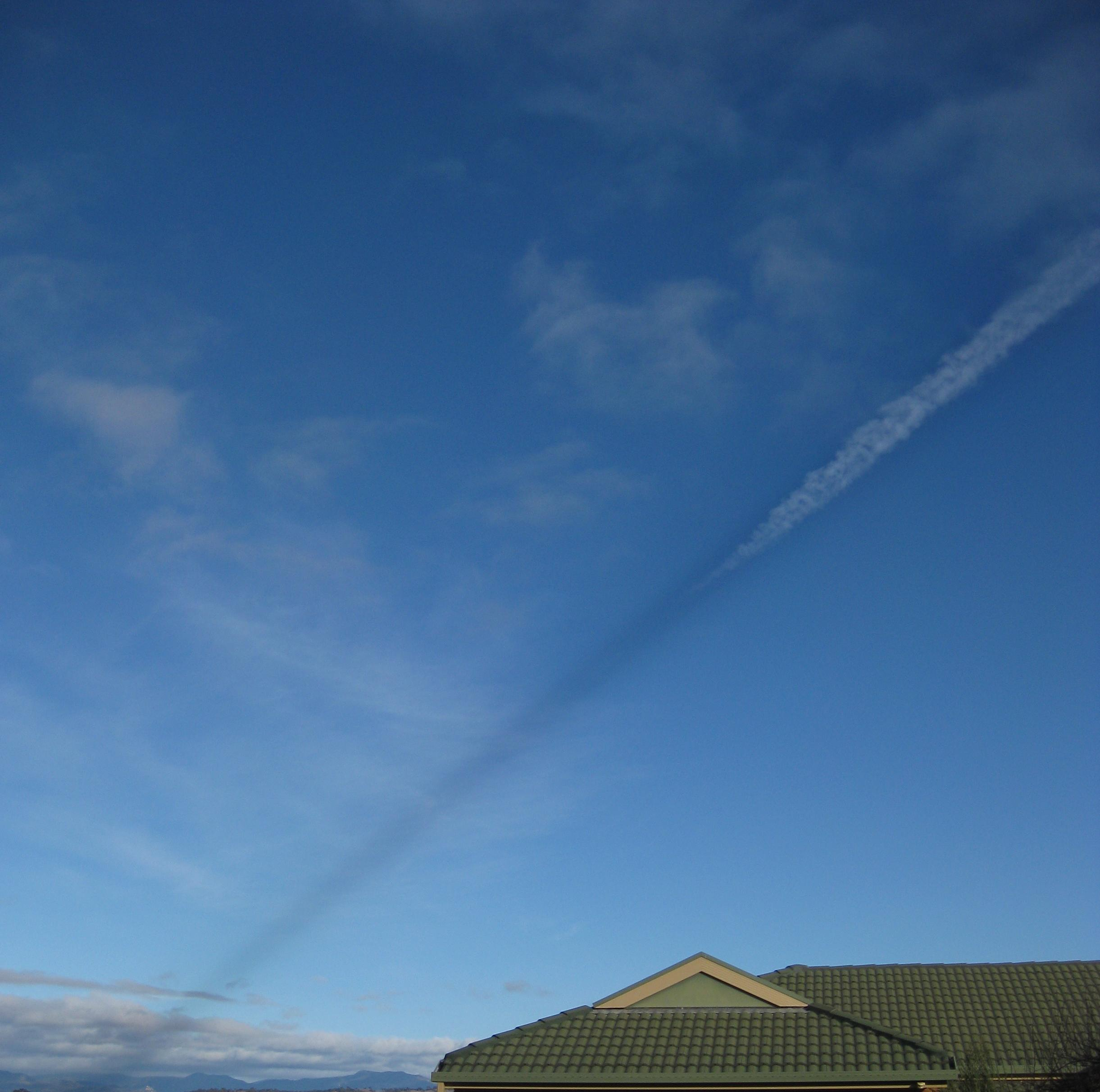
Shadow cast by vapor trail of passing aircraft

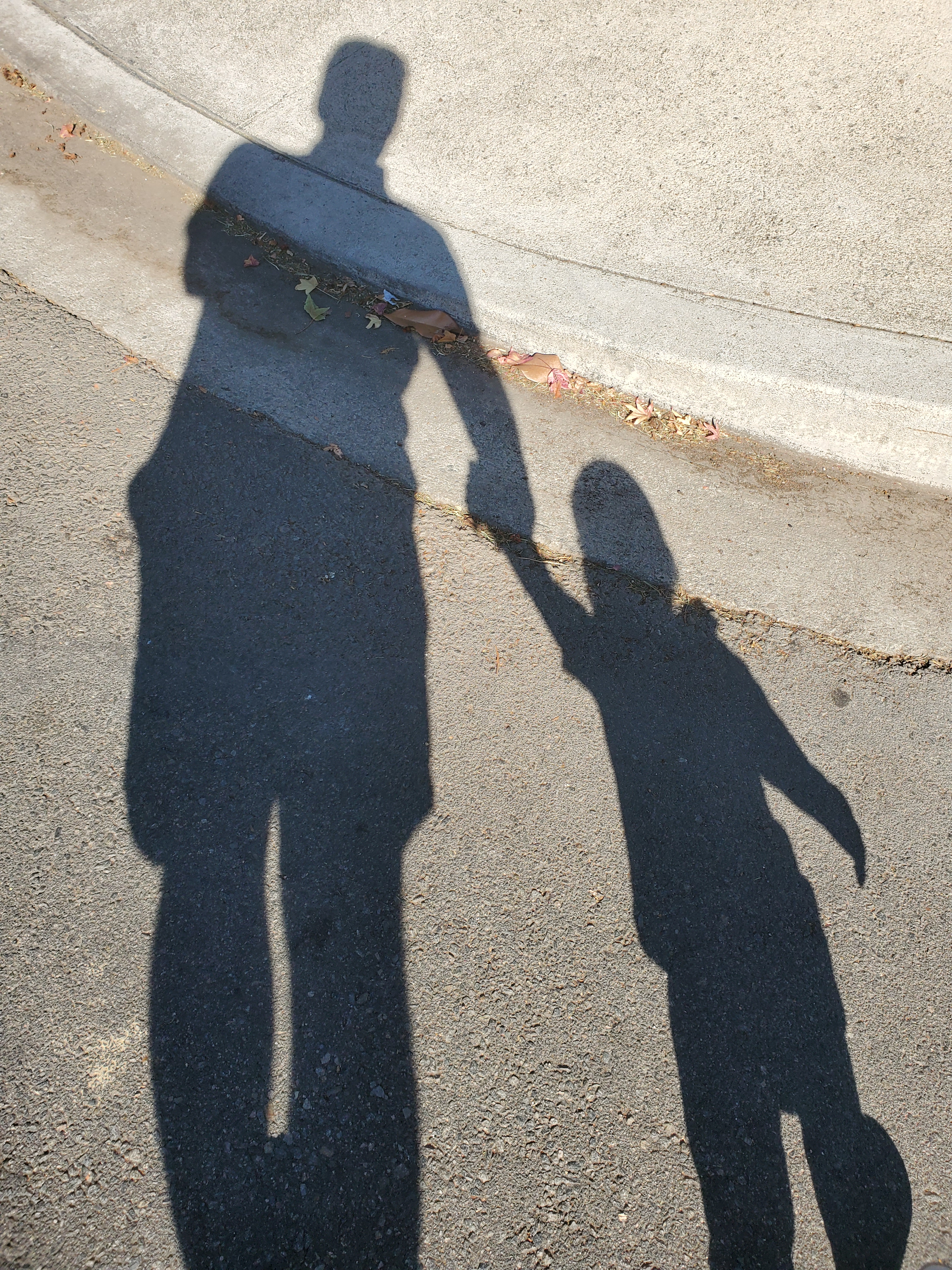
Shadow of a parent and child

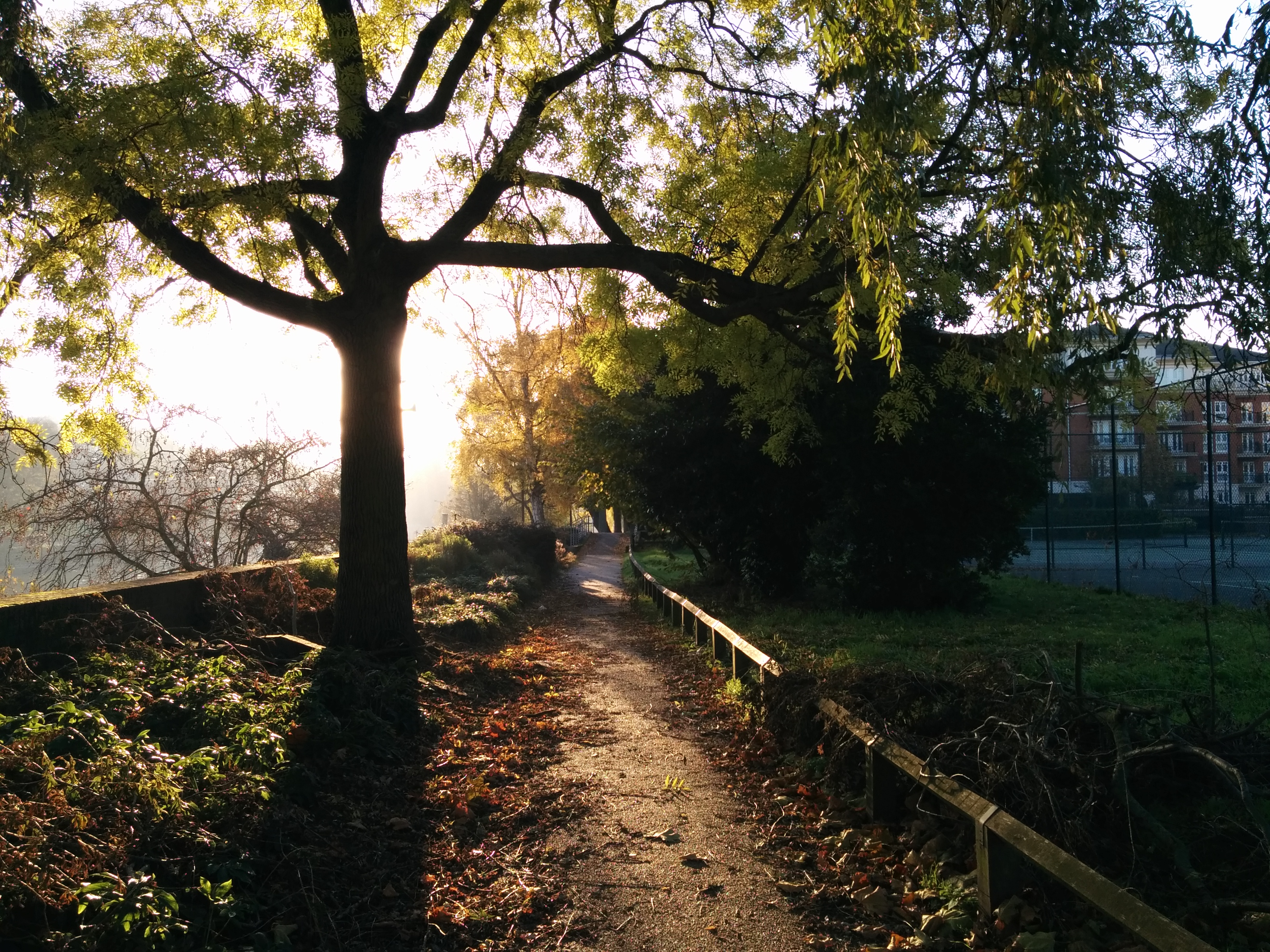
Tree shadow

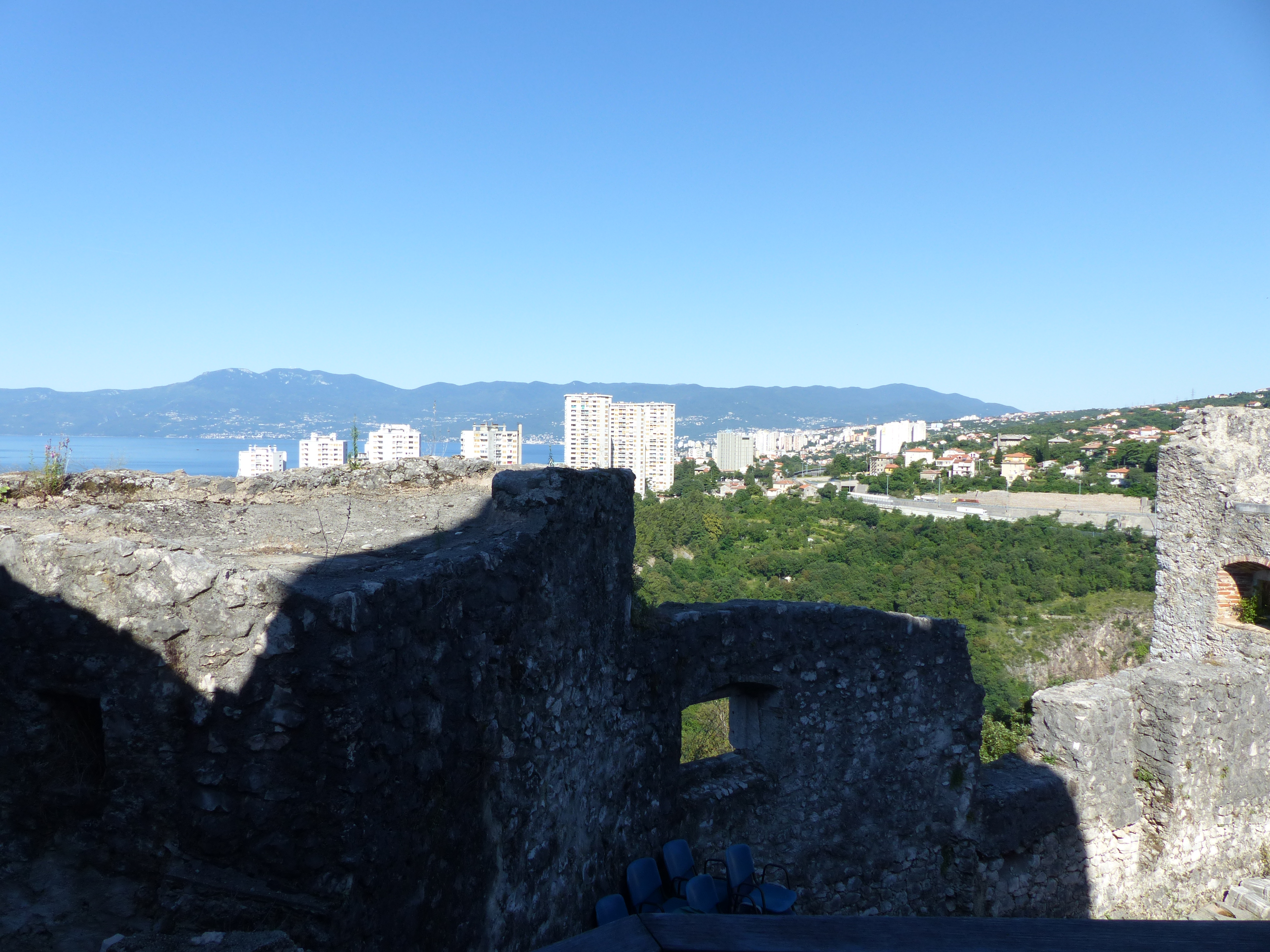
Shadow on the Castle

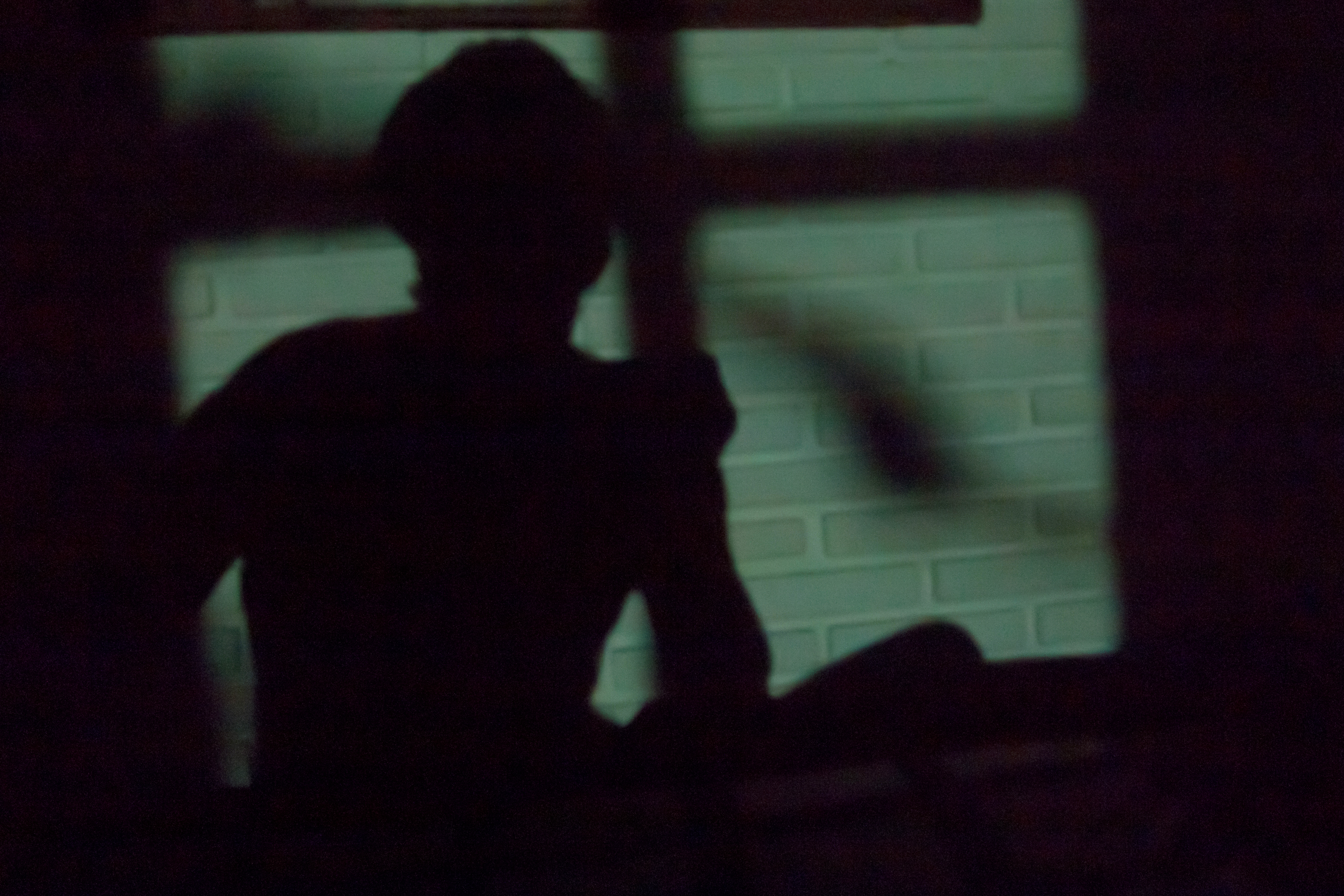
Moonlight shadow

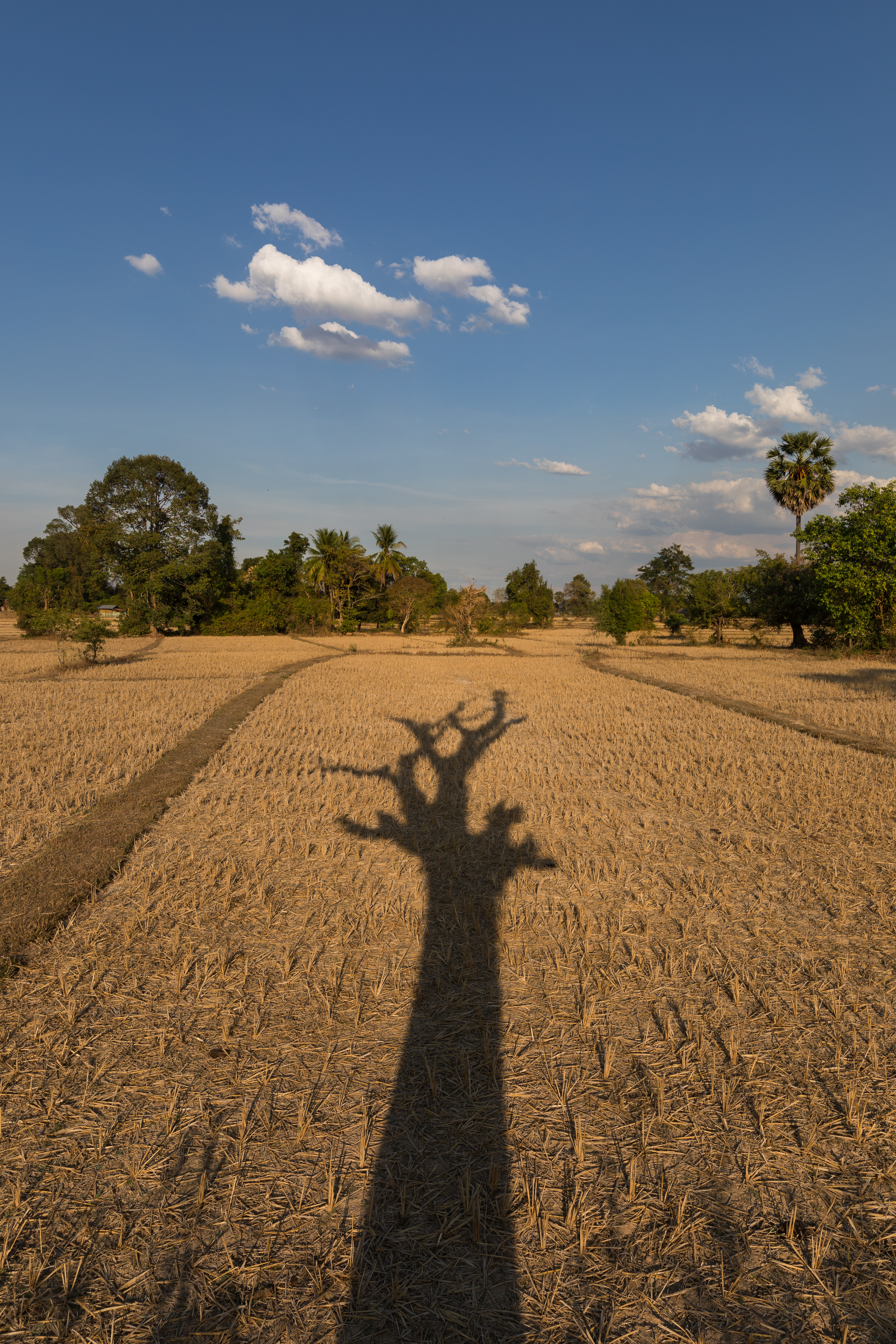
Long shadow of a dead tree with its branches on dry fields, late afternoon

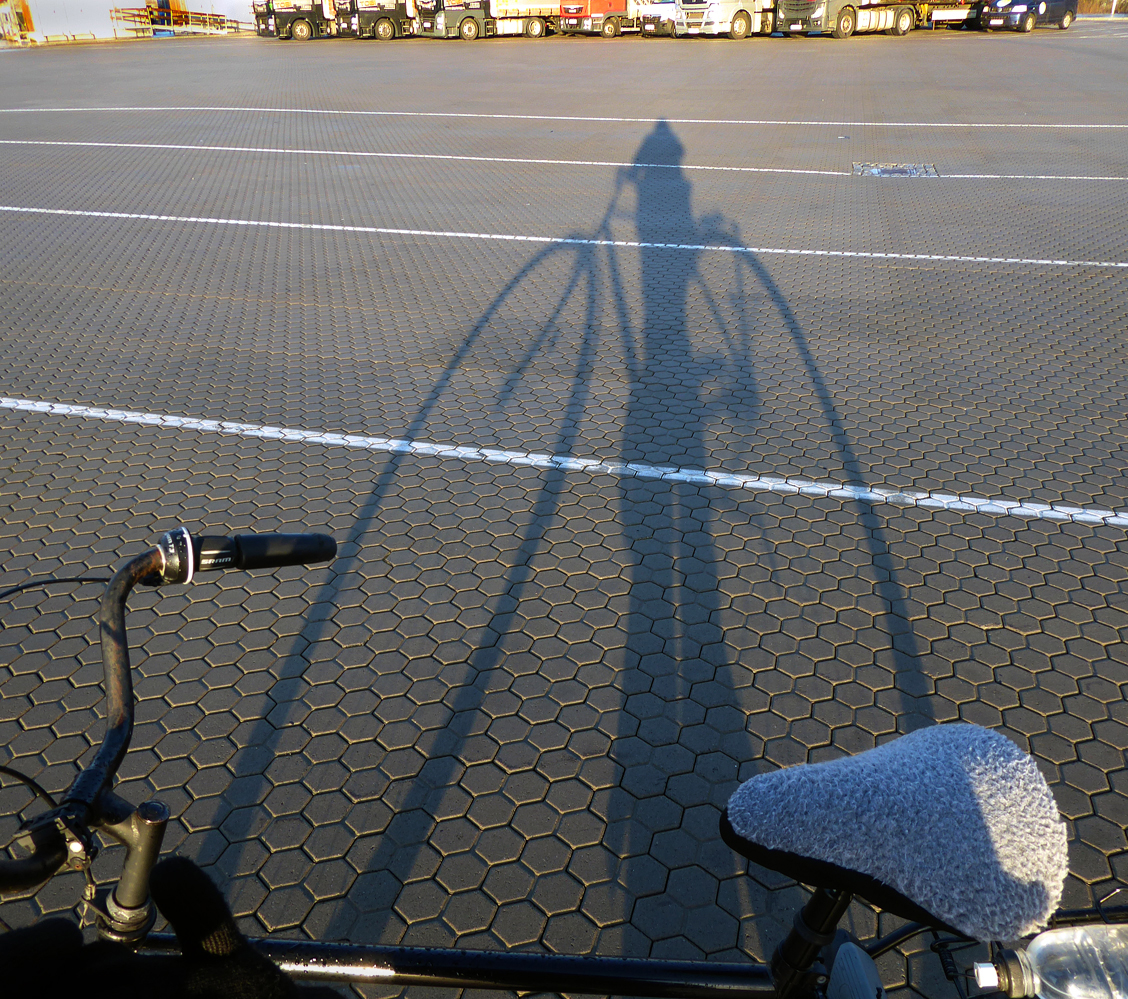
When the sun is low, shadows become long, and details get the wrong proportions.

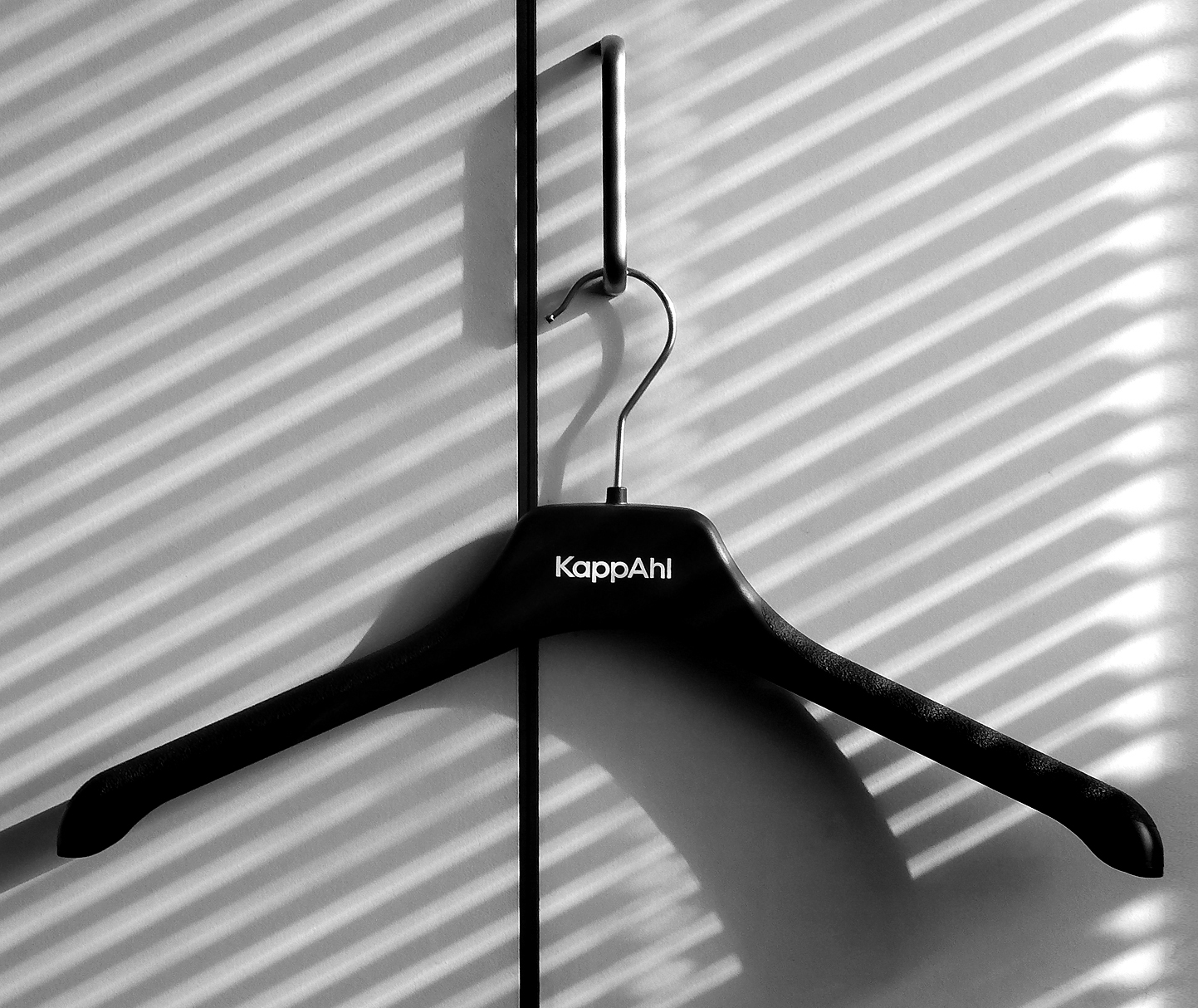
Shadows from a window blind

ᴘᴅꜰ The shadow
as signifier with unexpected meanings.

== See also ==
- Black drop effect
- Shadows in camouflage
- Convolution applications, for more physical and mathematical discussion about shadows
- Earth's shadow
- Gnomon
- Raking light
- Sciography, the art of architectural shadows
- Shadow Cabinet
- Shadow mapping, in computer 3D graphics
- Shadow people
- Shadow play
- Shadowgraphy or ombromanie, the art of hand shadows
