= Albert Almoznino =

Israeli artist (1923–2020)

Albert Almoznino אלברט אלמוזנינו
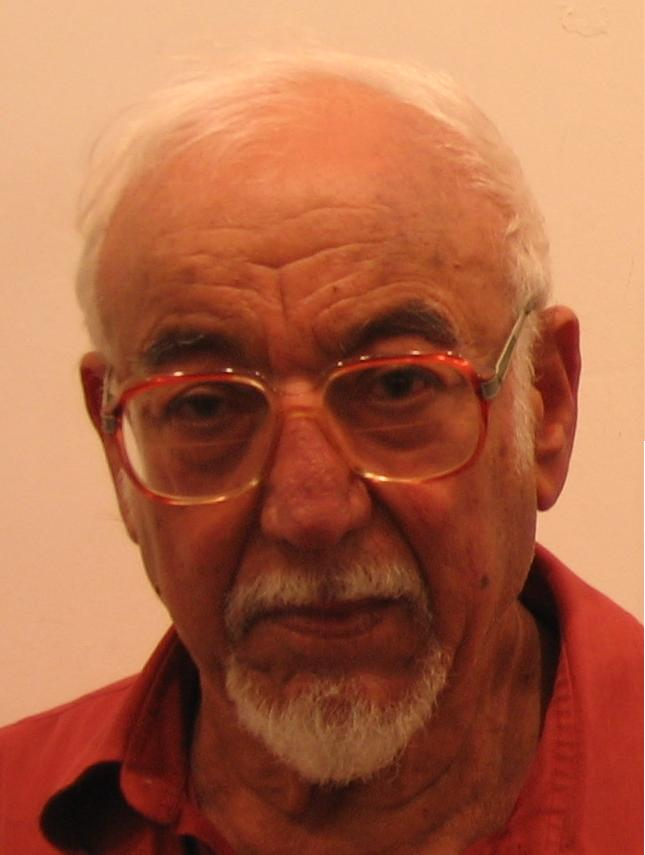

Background information
- Born: March 3, 1923; Mogador, Morocco
- Died: April 7, 2020 (aged 97)
- Genres: Hand Shadow Artist, painter, stained glass maker

Albert Almoznino (Hebrew: אלברט אלמוזנינו; March 3, 1923 – April 7, 2020) was an Israeli hand shadow artist. He gained international recognition in the years 1958-1975 when he performed his hand shadow skills in front of thousands of people at Radio City Music Hall New York, Paris Olympia, Reno Nevada, "The Ed Sullivan Show" and other places.

== Biography ==
Albert Almoznino was born in Mogador (Essaouira), Morocco in 1923. He immigrated to Israel when he was 25 years old. In his early years as a new citizen he was earning his money by teaching art in elementary school. In 1953 he became a lab technician at Weizmann Institute of Science and worked there, excluding the time spent on his performances abroad, until his retirement.

He performed only as an amateur until Ed Sullivan discovered him in a group of artists organized in Israel. Sullivan first featured him on his television program in 1958 together with Itzhak Perlman, Nechama Hendel and more talented young Israelis. At that tour he was guest artist in several more TV shows like "What's My Line?" and "To Tell the Truth".

In 1965-1971 he went on tours at New York, Paris and Reno, Nevada to perform at the great music halls like Radio City Music Hall and Paris Olympia.

In 1975 he was performing in South Africa together with Yehoram Gaon and Dudu Topaz. Since then he performed in many TV shows in Israel and in children's VCR tapes.

In addition to his hand shadow art, Almoznino is a well known Israeli painter and stained glass maker. He displayed his works in several exhibitions in Rishon Lezion, his home town, Tel Aviv, and Ashdod.

Almoznino died in April 2020 at the age of 97.

== Shadowgraphy ==
The art of making hand shadows — shadowgraphy — was popular in the 19th century. Shadow portraits of people's profiles (silhouettes) were even cut from dark paper and framed. The darkest, sharpest shadows are made using candlelight. When the electric light came into use shadowgraphy began to decline.

Almoznino in his performances revived this ancient art using only a small source light, a screen and his hands. With his two bare hands he created profiles of animals, plants, American cultural characters like cowboys, Native Americans, African Americans, and famous international politicians and celebrities. His show featured orchestra music and short stories enacted by the characters to entertain the audience and make them laugh.

=== The Art of Hand Shadows ===
The Art of Hand Shadows by Albert Almoznino explains and illustrates how to make the shadow characters that Almoznino created. The necessary equipment is only a source of light like a candle and a white wall or screen.

==== The characters in the book ====
- Animals like: monkey, deer, elephant, wolf, birds, leopard, rabbit, camel, giraffe and many more.
- Plants like: cactus and flowers.
- Famous buildings like the Eiffel Tower and churches.
- Famous politicians like the US presidents from Abraham Lincoln to Richard Nixon. Other countries' leaders like David Ben-Gurion and Gamal Abdel Nasser.

== See also ==
- Shadow play
- Félicien Trewey
