= Écriture à l'envers =

1896 French silent short film by Louis Lumière

- The film
- Directed by: Louis Lumière
- Produced by: Société Lumière
- Starring: Félicien Trewey
- Production company: Société Lumière
- Release date: 1896
- Running time: 50 seconds
- Country: France
- Language: Silent

Écriture à l'envers (English: Writing Backwards) is a 1896 French silent short film directed by Louis Lumière. The film documents the celebrated magician and music‑hall performer Félicien Trewey demonstrating his famous backward‑writing act, a specialty that had made him internationally known in the late nineteenth century. The film is listed as Vue no. 42 in the official Lumière catalogue and was photographed at the Lumière family property in La Ciotat.

== Description ==
The film consists of a single static shot showing Trewey writing the phrase “Mesdames et Messieurs nos Remerciements” on a chalkboard. He begins at the end of the sentence and writes each letter in reverse order, producing a phrase that becomes legible when viewed in a mirror. The frontal staging, fixed camera position, and real‑time performance reflect the Lumière studio's characteristic approach to non‑fiction filmmaking.

== Exhibition ==
According to the Institut Lumière, the film premiered in Lyon on 30 August 1896.

== Cast ==
- Félicien Trewey – himself

== Sources ==
- "Écriture à l'envers". Catalogue Lumière. 3 December 2013.
