= Chapeaugraphy =

Panhandling trick

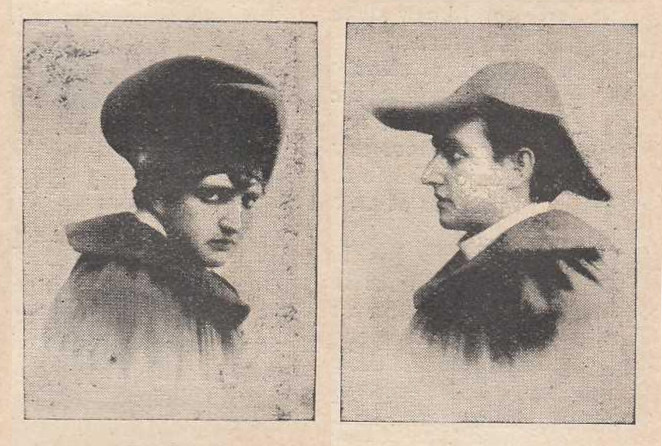
19th century performer Alfred Leslie demonstrating chapeaugraphy as Napoleon (left) and Wellington (right)

Chapeaugraphy, occasionally anglicised to chapography, is a novelty act and a busking trick in which a ring-shaped piece of felt is manipulated to look like various types of hats. It would often be performed as a quick-change act.

The act originated in 1618 with Parisian street performer Tabarin, the most famous of the charlatans who combined a French version of commedia dell'arte with a quack medicine show. He described his felt hat as "true raw material, indifferent to all forms".

In the 1870s another French comedian, Monsieur Fusier, revived the act and managed 15 hat-twisting styles in his act. The act was first performed in England by the French magician Félicien Trewey, who performed a tribute act titled "Tabarin, or Twenty-Five Heads under One Hat". An 1899 magazine recounts "one or two smart English performers" of that time, including Alfred Leslie.

Although rarely seen today, it was featured in an episode of Saturday Night Live in 1985, as performed by magician Harry Anderson.

Types of hat that can be created include the following:

- baseball cap
- American and British army hats from the Revolutionary War
- pirate's hat
- naval captain's hat
- Mickey Mouse ears
- Ushanka (a Russian fur hat)
- mortarboard (a graduation cap)
- Catholic nun's headwear
- derby hat

== Notable chapeaugraphers ==
Félicien Trewey in Louis Lumière's 1896 short film Chapeaux à transformation

- Tabarin, a French comedian, the creator of Le Chapeau de Tabarin.
- Monsieur Fusier, another French comedian who revived the act.
- Félicien Trewey, who brought the art form renewed interest and a new name, Treweyism, around the world in the 19th century after seeing Monsieur Fusier
- Disguido, an Italian magician duet formed by Guido Marini and Isabella Raponi Zanivan, is known for their creative performances combining illusionism, theatre, and magic. In 2010, they created the performance Chapeau Cinema, which they presented at the World Magic Championships, FISM, in 2015 (Rimini, Italy) and 2018 (Busan, Korea). Their act modernized the art of chapeaugraphy, creating new forms of hats (such as a bull, telephone, shark, and knife sharpener) and integrating them with cinema.
