= Elizabeth Warlock =

20th-century British magician and author

Elizabeth Warlock (born c. 1933) is a British magician and author. She has won several awards and is the daughter of the stage magician Peter Warlock.

== Career ==
Warlock has been a stage magician since the age of 16. By the 1970s, she was internationally famous and writing a monthly column for The Linking Ring. She is the author of the 2005 book, published by Kaufman and Company: One Hundred by Warlock - A collection of 100 magic tricks originated by her father, Peter Warlock. She is the 2002 winner of the British Magical Society's the David Berglas Award for services to the arts and in 1953 she was the first woman and the youngest person to win the International Brotherhood of Magicians British Ring Shield. She has also won The Magic Circle's Golden Jubilee Grand Prix.

== Personal life ==
Warlock was born c. 1933 and is from King's Norton, Birmingham, England. She is the daughter of stage magician Peter Warlock. She worked at the Inland Revenue and is married to a magician.
