= Vanishing bird cage =

The vanishing bird cage, also known as the flying birdcage, is a classic parlour magic effect that was invented by French magician Buatier De Kolta.

The magician displays a bird cage, holding it between both of his hands. The cage is rectangular, about six inches tall by six inches wide by eight inches long, and made of wire on all six sides. Often there is a bird, though in modern performances of the act it is usually fake, inside the cage. The magician will offer the cage for inspection by an audience member, but he will never actually release his grip of it. Then, without covering the cage, the magician makes a sudden motion and the cage (and anything inside) vanishes from sight.

== Method ==
The bird cage is designed to collapse if it is not supported from both ends. Two of the opposite corners of the cage pull away from each other so that the box becomes somewhat of a tube, about 18 inches long and only one or two inches thick, that resembles a bundle of wire that is thicker in the middle than at the ends. An elastic cord attached to one end of the cage runs up the sleeve of the magician's jacket so that when the cage collapses, it is drawn up his sleeve and hidden from view. As a living bird is likely to be injured or killed when the cage collapses, fake birds are most commonly used in modern presentations of the vanishing bird cage.
