= Buatier De Kolta =

French magician (1845–1903)

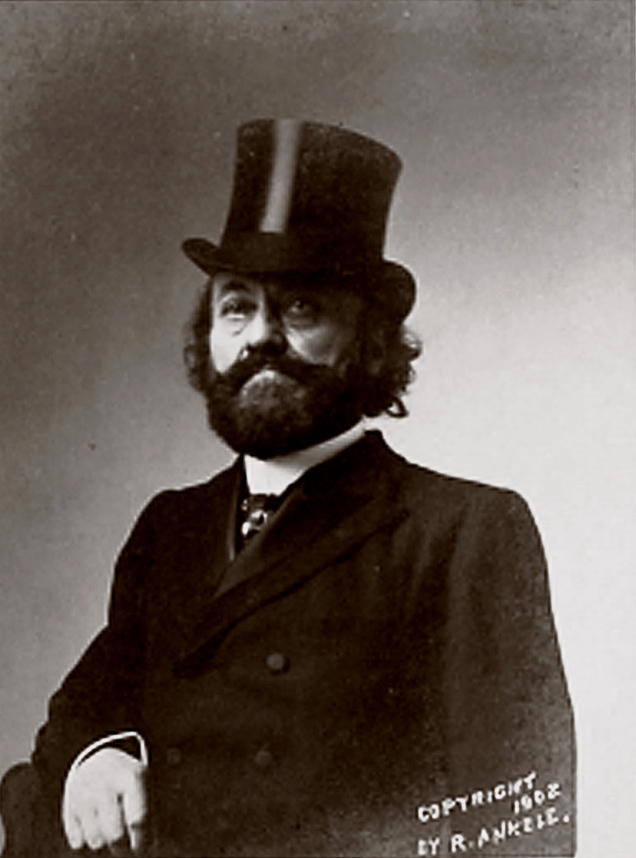
Buatier de Kolta in 1902

Buatier de Kolta (né Joseph Buatier; Caluire-et-Cuire, 18 November 1845 – New Orleans, 7 October 1903) was a French magician who performed throughout the latter part of the 1800s in Europe and the United States.

== Biography ==
Joseph Buatier was born in Caluire-et-Cuire (Rhône, France). His parents, Mariette Rambaud and Claude Buatier, were fabric merchants. He started reading books on magic at age six, and as a teenager he was already performing in amateur magic shows in his school. However his father, a devout Catholic, wanted him to become a priest, and persuaded him to enter a seminary. At age 18, he left it and worked as a painter, sharing a studio in Lyon with his more talented friend Elie-Joseph Laurent (1841–1926). He also resumed his performances as an amateur magician, and one was noticed by Hungarian impresario Julius Vida de Kolta, who persuaded him to make magic his profession. His shows were immediately successful and he took the stage name Buatier de Kolta, acknowledging his debt to the impresario.

In 1870, he started a European tour taking him to Italy, Germany, the Netherlands, and Spain, and was invited to perform at the Théâtre Robert-Houdin in Paris. In 1874, he left Vida de Kolta and continued with a different impresario, who in 1875 took him to the Egyptian Hall in London and to Russia. In 1891, he left for his first tour of the United States. He started a second tour there in 1902, but died in New Orleans in 1903.

De Kolta is the subject of the book Buatier de Kolta: Genius of Illusion by Peter Warlock. The city of Lyon named a street in the Quartier Le Vernay after him.

== Notable illusions ==
De Kolta was a contemporary of fellow French magician Jean-Eugène Robert-Houdin. He was highly creative and developed illusions using his engineering skills. Many of his illusions, such as Multiplying Balls, the Expanding Die, the Vanishing Lady, Spring Flowers from a Cone, and the vanishing bird cage, are performed by magicians today.

It is the Vanishing Lady that is so particularly known today and still used that magicians now refer to it as the De Kolta Chair. A woman is seated on a chair, was then covered by a large cloth, and would appear to vanish before the audience. The effect was a signature piece of Richiardi Jr – after he made the woman vanish, she apparently reappeared moments later from an empty trunk on the other side of the stage.

During his career, perhaps his most famous illusion was the one known as "The Expanding Dice." A 200 mm-side dice on a table grew up to 800 mm and opened to reveal a young lady inside, who often was Buatier's wife. Harry Houdini purchased the dice after Buatier's death. However, the illusion was difficult to perform, so Houdini did not continue with this apparatus. David Copperfield has performed the Expanding Die trick, and the original die is kept in Copperfield's private museum.

== Death ==
Buatier de Kolta died in New Orleans on October 7, 1903, at the age of 55, of acute Bright's disease. In 1879 he had married a British woman, Alice Constance Mumford, who had him buried in London in Hendon Cemetery. Little is known about the tricks he had invented as he had asked his wife to burn all his notes after his death.

== See also ==
- La Maison de la Magie Robert-Houdin
