= Félicien Trewey =

French magician (1848–1920)

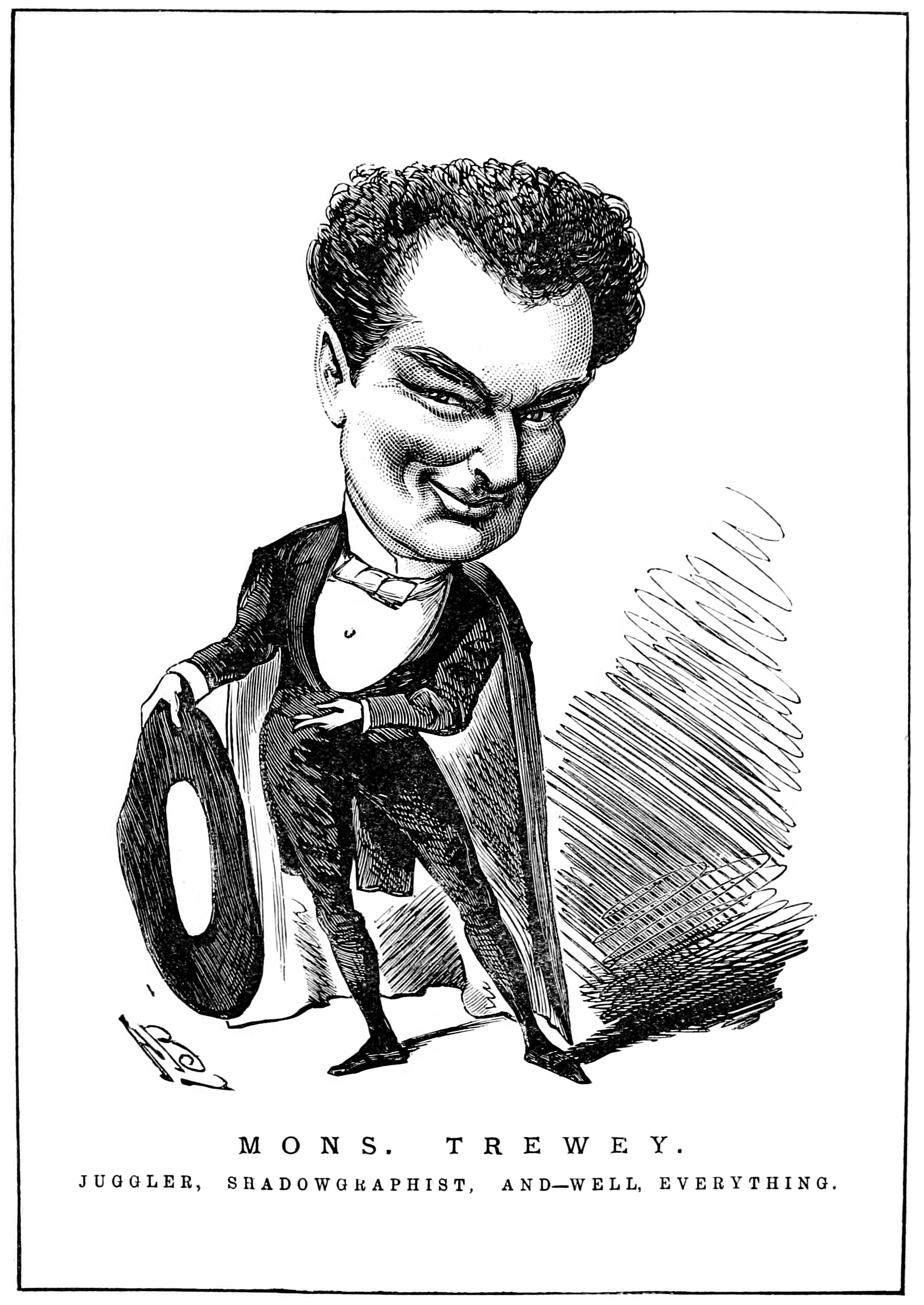
Alfred Bryan caricature of Trewey for the London newspaper Entr'acte (May 7, 1887)

Félicien Trewey (born Félicien-François Trevey; 23 May 1848 – 2 December 1920), was a French magician, mime, comedian, vaudevillian, tightrope walker, balance artist, dancer, musician, chapeaugraphist and shadowgraphist. His principal entertainment was balancing tricks, of which he was a grand master. He was a great card-thrower, scaling cards at great distances. He gave musical entertainment with instruments of his own invention. He had great skill in the uncommon art of writing any words selected by his audience backwards and was an exceptional lightning sketch artist. King Edward VII saw Trewey perform on many occasions, and the Emperor of Austria, Baron Rothschild and many others invited him to perform for them. He also played in several films directed by his good friend Louis Lumière, including Chapeaux a Transformation (1896), Le Photographe (1895), Danseuses des rues (1896), Écriture à l'envers (1896), and Partie de cartes (1895).

== Life and career ==
Trewey in Louis Lumière's 1896 short film Chapeaux à transformation

Trewey in Lumière's Écriture à l’envers (1896)

Trewey was born in a workshop in the paper-making town of Angoulême in France. His father was a machinist who worked at one of the manufactories and lived on the premises. Although his father wanted him to become an engineer at the manufactory, Trewey made up his mind what he wanted to do at seven years old. He was taken to a circus in Marseille and saw a conjurer. He immediately began practicing juggling and magic tricks. His performances were accepted and encouraged by his schoolmates. He set up a "rough proscenium" at a back window of his dad's house where he performed the ever-so-popular Punch and Judy by draping rags over his hands.

At the age of ten, his father tried yielding his love of conjuring by sending him to a seminary to become a priest. There he would practice his love in the gymnasium. He did very good in the school plays there and always tried being the comic man. After three years at the seminar, his parents went to Marseille for a short holiday but decided to stay. As he was kept at home, engineering boosted and he went to work in the factory daily. It was actually a delightful change and he could go see all the conjurers and jugglers at the circus. He worked around a lathe which could make conjuring items and being surrounded by items he could balance (i.e. hammers, vices, anvils) he practiced and progressed his skills rapidly.

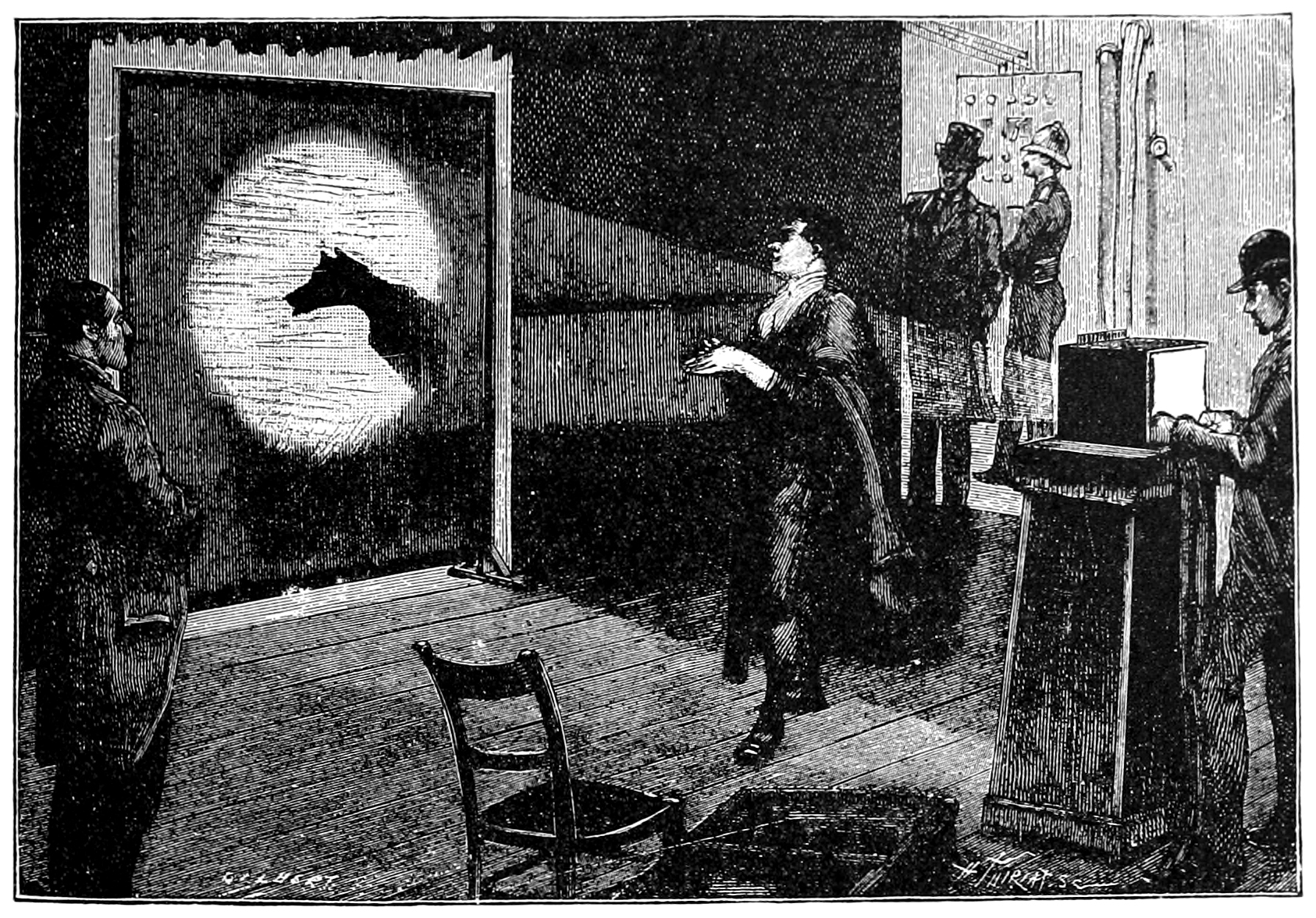
Illustration of Trewey demonstrating shadowgraphy

At fifteen years old, and after practicing since he was seven, he decided he could perform publicly and being near expert he went on to his professional career after running away with a not-much-older professional acrobat. The two traveling boys were fairly successful while performing at cafes around the neighborhoods, but at times they found themselves tired and hungry. Sometimes they had to rely on borrowing objects from the owner of the cafe for juggling and balancing feats such as knives, bottles, forks and such. After a year on the road, his reputation grew and landed him in a Marseille music hall, making tenpence (a coin worth ten pennies) a day. He took part in comedy and pantomime every night. The audience appreciated the performances by throwing money onto the stage, which Trewey got a good share of. He saved up enough money to buy himself two new costumes. He was able to command himself an engagement at the Alcazar, a principal place for amusement in Marseille, where he found himself his first great success. He was now seventeen years old and his success was constantly improving, as was his skills. He soon became a favorite performer in popular towns South of France for the next three to four years. He then went back to being a peripatetic and became a proprietor of a traveling caravan pantomime and variety company. During their travels, Trewey would play many parts, including Pierrot and Cassandre, the clown and pantaloon of French pantomime. He also danced the "Clodoche", a grotesque quadrille.

Trewey was most successful in Bordeaux, performing new feats of balancing, a new and original style of entertainment at the time. It was a style he became identified with and "Treweyism" became a household word. His appearance of "the clown de Salon" consists of a black skin-tight costume, a chalked face, and a white powdered periwig. He was offered a performance at the Concert des Ambassadeurs in Paris and it was there his success was complete. Since then, he was never without any gigs. He stayed in Paris for nine years, performing at all the principal places of entertainment. Afterwards, he toured in many places around Europe (i.e. Austria, Belgium, Spain, Russia, Germany, England) with great success. His success was so great in Spain, matchboxes were sold bearing his portrait. His portrait (with political and social significance) appeared in well-known papers all across Europe, including Journal Illustre, La Ilustración Española y Americana, Der Wostellung Zeitung, La Campana de Gracia, La Bombe, Le Jeune Garde, La Caricature, The Entr'acte, The Looking Glass, and The Northern Review. In 1889, when Trewey was around 40 years of age, he joined Alexander Herrmann in New York.

Trewey died at the age of 72 at his home, Villa Traverserie, in Asnières-sur-Seine on 2 December 1920. Earlier that same year his book The Art of Shadowgraphy: How it is Done was published.

== See also ==
- Shadowgraphy
- Shadow play
- List of defunct newspapers of France
- Auguste and Louis Lumière
- Honoré Daumier
