= Edward Victor =

British magician (1887–1964)

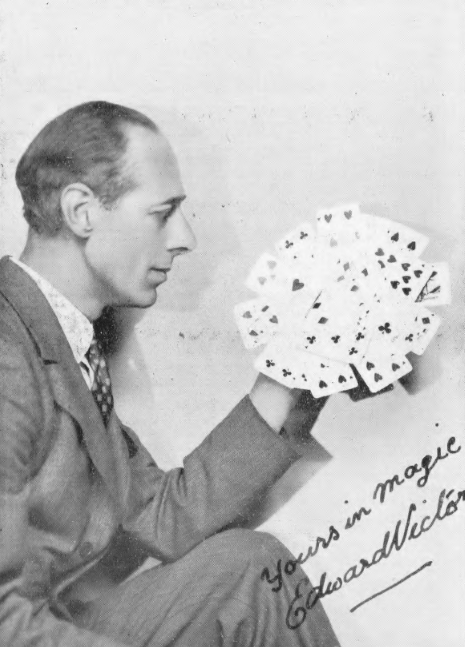
- Born: Edward Victor; 1887; England
- Died: 17 April 1964 (aged 76–77)
- Other name: Edward Victor
- Occupation: Magician
- Known for: Sleight of hand, card magic

Edward Victor (1887 – 17 April 1964), born Edward Neuschwander, was a notable stage magician. He was an early member of the Magic Circle and was promoted to the Inner Magic Circle, and for over thirty years was president of the Merlin Magical Society.

Early in his career he also took up shadowgraphy.

== History ==
In 1911, a trial week at St. George's Hall was extended to many months, setting the standard for his professional career. He played top variety theatres in Europe and South Africa and was often seen on television (including a "What's My Line?" appearance which he was quickly recognized). Victor was the Blackpool Magicians' club's first Honorary Life President.

== Published works ==
- Magic of the Hand (1937)
- More Magic of the Hands (1938)
- Further Magic of the Hands (1946)
- Classic Card Tricks (2004) Dover Publications
