= Max Holden (magician) =

Scottish-American entertainer

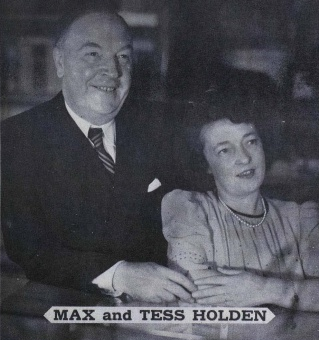
- Holden (left) in 1948
- Born: William Holden Maxwell; August 20, 1884; Glasgow, Scotland, UK
- Died: July 3, 1949 (aged 64); Oceanside, New York, U.S.
- Occupation: Professional magician
- Spouse(s): Clotilda (Cora) Amaral (m. Feb. 15, 1913-Oct. 28, 1913; her death) Elizabeth "Tess" Maxwell (m. May 3, 1921–July 3, 1949); his death
- Children: 2

William Holden Maxwell (professionally known as Max Holden; August 20, 1884 – July 3, 1949) was a Scottish-born American vaudeville performance artist and magician.

== Early life ==
The son of a cabinetmaker, William Holden Maxwell was born on the twentieth of August 1884 at Glasgow, Scotland. Maxwell had an early interest in magic and while still in his teens placed a classified ad as Max Holden in the publication Magic: The Magicians Monthly Magazine, asking for information on magic tricks and juggling. Around this time Maxwell was learning his craft as an apprentice to British magician David Devant before striking out on his own as a magician and juggler touring the Moss Empires circuit in Great Britain.

In 1905 Maxwell chose to immigrate to America where he took up residence in Boston, Massachusetts. The following year he was joined by his parents, Samuel and Mary along with his brother John May Maxwell (1889–1967). In America Samuel Maxwell was able to apply his trade as a cabinetmaker at a furniture factory in nearby Revere while John eventually became a patternmaker for Hunt-Spiller manufacturing in Boston. In 1915 William Maxwell became a naturalized citizen of the United States of America.

== Career ==
In time Maxwell (as Max Holden) became successful performing his magic act in America on the Keith-Albee-Orpheum and Marcus Loew circuits. He was known for his shadowgraphy shows that he improved in 1914 with an invention of his own that added an array of colors onto the shadowgraph screen. Maxwell would go on to spend a number of years touring abroad and was said to have crossed the Atlantic some eighty-six times over his near quarter century career.

In 1929 Maxwell retired from the stage and with the help of fellow magician, Lewis Davenport, opened a magic shop in Manhattan with later branches in Philadelphia and Boston. The Max Holden's Magic Shop on 42nd Street soon became a mecca for professional and amateur magicians interested in honing their art and exchanging new ideas.

The magic community was outraged when in 1933 Camel Cigarettes ran a series of magazine advertisements with the tagline "It's Fun to be Fooled, But It's More Fun to Know", that revealed to the public how magicians performed certain illusions. Maxwell's involvement in the ad campaign did not become known until sometime after his death in 1949.

== Marriage ==
Maxwell wed Clotilda (Cora) Amaral in 1913 in Rutland, Vermont. They had a daughter, Madeline (Mary). Clotilda died of childbirth complications in 1913. Before her death she had worked as his assistant. Maxwell later married Elizabeth Morrison on May 3, 1921, at Waterbury, Connecticut, and the following year they had a son, William Jr., who was born in Melbourne during their tour of Australia. Over the early years of their marriage Elizabeth (nicknamed "Tess") performed onstage with Maxwell as half of the team of Holden and Graham.

== Death ==
William Holden Maxwell died on July 3, 1949, after a long illness at South Nassau Communities Hospital in Oceanside, New York. He was survived by his wife and son. William Holden Maxwell Jr. died in Massachusetts on January 9, 2011.

== Published works ==
- Card Tricks That Anyone Can Do (1934)
- Modern Hand Shadows (1935)
- Programmes of Famous Magicians (1937)
- Manual of Juggling (1947)

== See also ==
- List of magicians
- Jugglers
