= Shadowgraphy (performing art) =

Performance art utilizing light and shadow

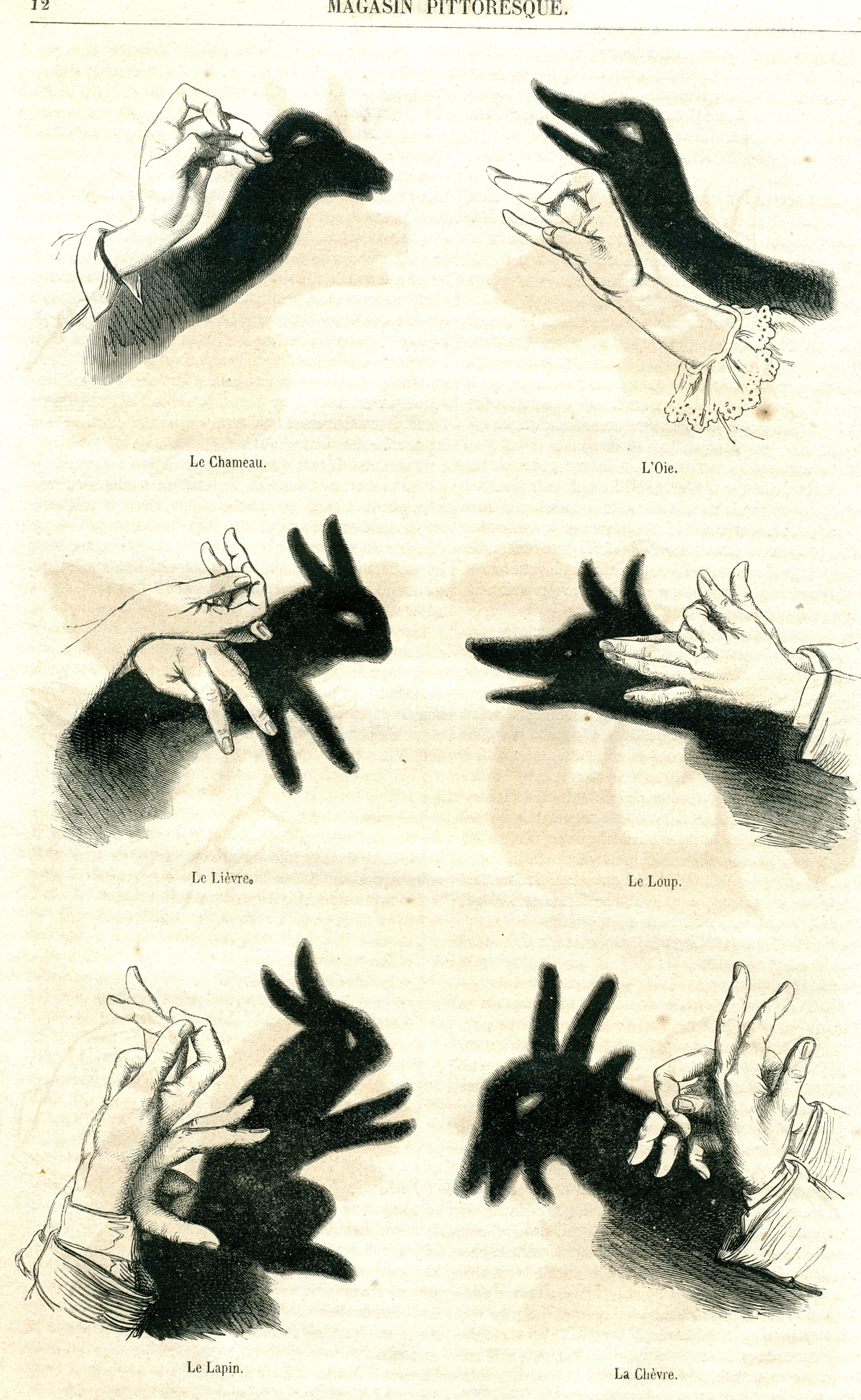
Hand shadows of various creatures

Shadowgraphy or ombromanie is the art of performing a story or show using images made by hand shadows. It can be called "cinema in silhouette". Performers are titled as a shadowgraphist or shadowgrapher.

The art has declined since the late 19th century when electricity became available to homes because light bulbs and electric lamps do not give off good shadows and because cinema and television were becoming a new form of entertainment. Shadows are greatly defined by candlelight; therefore hand shadows were common in earlier centuries.

The modern art of hand shadows was made popular by the French entertainer Félicien Trewey in the 19th century. He popularized the art by making silhouettes of famous personalities.

== History ==
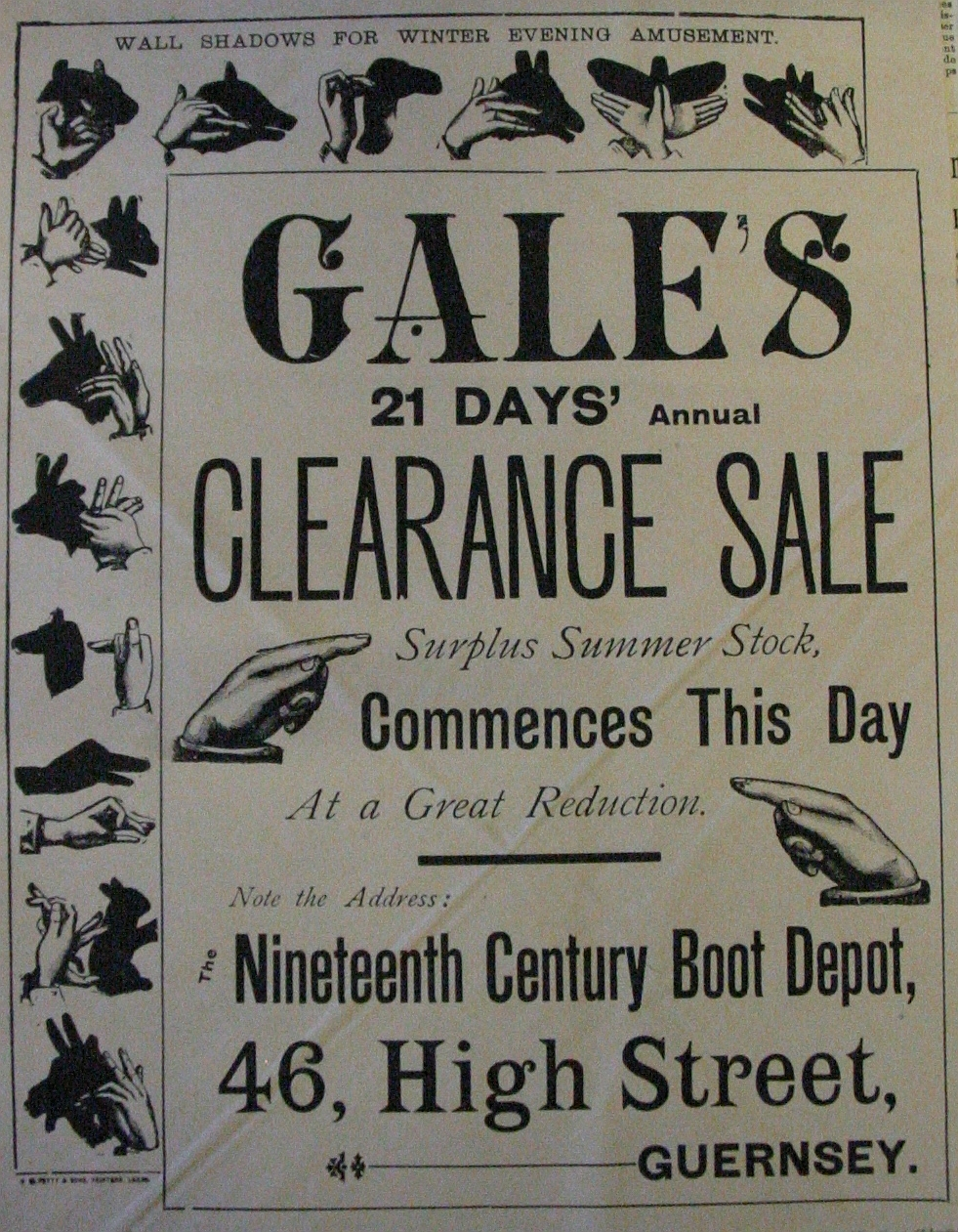
An 1889 advertisement with examples of hand shadows

Shadows have existed since the existence of objects obstructing light, so it is hard to say when the art was first used by humans for entertainment. It could have been practiced by ancient or later humans, but it probably originated in the Far East. The French entertainer Félicien Trewey was interested in the art of Chinese shadow puppetry called Ombres Chinoises (known in China as the pi ying xi (皮影戲)), which means "Chinese shadows". He popularized the art of hand shadows when he developed shadows of famous silhouettes. It then became popular in Europe in the 19th century.

Although the art is popular amongst different kinds of entertainers, it seems prominent amongst magicians, because it was popularized by a magician who inspired many other magicians. Félicien Trewey perfected the widely known elephant, bird, and cat hand shadows and created some of his own such as The Volunteer, Robinson Crusoe, The Jockey, The Rope Dancer and more. In 1889, Trewey joined with Alexander Herrmann who most likely learned it from him. David Tobias Bamberg most likely learned it from Alexander who then passed it down to his son Okito (Tobias Leendert Bamberg) who then passed it down to his son Fu Manchu (David Theodore Bamberg). Fu Manchu passed his skill to Marcelo Contento, one of his apprentices, who became famous worldwide for it. Contento died before he could pass it on to his son.

Other magicians who used hand shadows in their act include David Devant, Edward Victor, and the duo Holden and Graham in which Holden was famous for his "Monkey in the Belfry" shadow.

== Performance ==
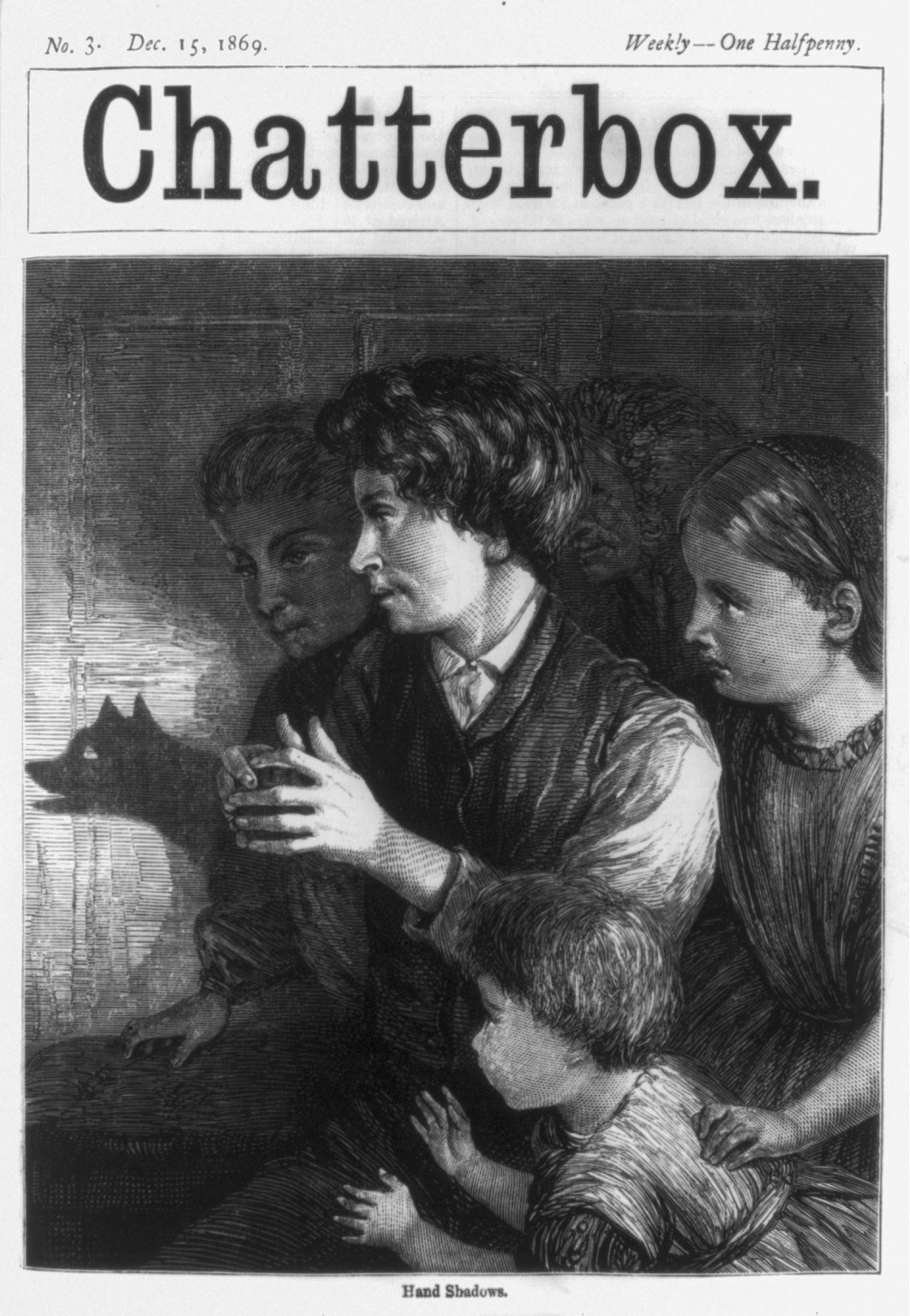
A hand shadow being thrown

The hands and fingers are exercised and different finger positions are practiced to help aid in forming shadows.

The light source to be used should be small and bright. The best shadows come from light proceeding from the smallest possible point. Albert Almoznino suggests a candle, a flashlight (with the lens and reflector removed) or any very small light. If a bulb is used, it should be clear. J. C. Cannell suggests in his book, Modern Conjuring For Amateurs, that the best source of light is the electric arc, which Almoznino agrees to the small arc lamp, and the second best being the limelight (if used with a high-class jet). Trewey suggests the chalk for the limelight to be cut in a triangular form, or else it will produce a gray border around the shadow. Cannell states another favorite amongst shadowgraphists is the use of acetylene gas (i.e. acetylene gas lamp or carbide lamp). Nowadays it is possible to use a single lensless (for example, SMD) LED.

Albert Almoznino suggests to use a white or light-colored wall, sheet or table cloth for a small audience as in a private home. If a wall is dark-colored, the sheet or table cloth can be hung against it. If performing for a large audience such as in an auditorium or on a stage, he suggests a screen made of muslin or other thin cloth attached to a frame. In a nightclub, hall or small theater, he suggests a nylon screen on a pliable aluminum frame. It is a screen sometimes used for TV projection called a rear projection screen, but the light must be stronger like a small spotlight without the projector, lenses, or diffusers, or a motion-picture projector with the front lenses removed.

The performer sits or stands between the light source and the blank surface, while having the option to perform in front of the performance surface or behind it, with each having different advantages. The performer has another option to perform from the left or the right of the light source. The farther the hands are from the light, the smaller the shadows will be, while the closer the hands are to the light, the larger the shadows will be. Also, the closer the hands are to the blank surface, the sharper the shadows will be. Trewey suggests that the most convenient distance for the light from the hands is four feet while the hands from the performance surface should be about six feet. The performer should always watch their shadows instead of their hands.

Movement helps give the shadows character and brings them to life. Some shadows are performed with accessories attached to the hands or fingers to achieve movements or images not applicable to hands alone.

== Notable shadowgraphers ==
- Prahlad Acharya
- Albert Almoznino
- David Bamberg
- Tobias Bamberg
- Arturo Brachetti
- Raymond Crowe
- Max Holden
- Félicien Trewey
- Edward Victor
- Hans Davis

== Books ==
- Hand Shadows to be Thrown Upon the Wall by Henry Bursill (1859)
- Hand Shadows – Second Series by Henry Bursill (1860)
- Home Fun by Cecil H. Bullivant (1910)--contains a chapter on Hand Shadows
- The Art of Shadowgraphy – How it is Done by Trewey (1920)
- Hand Shadows: The Complete Art of Shadowgraphy by Lois Nikola (1921)
- The Art of Hand Shadows by Albert Almoznino (1970)
- Shadowplay by George Mendoza and Prasanna Rao (1974)
