= Tabarin =

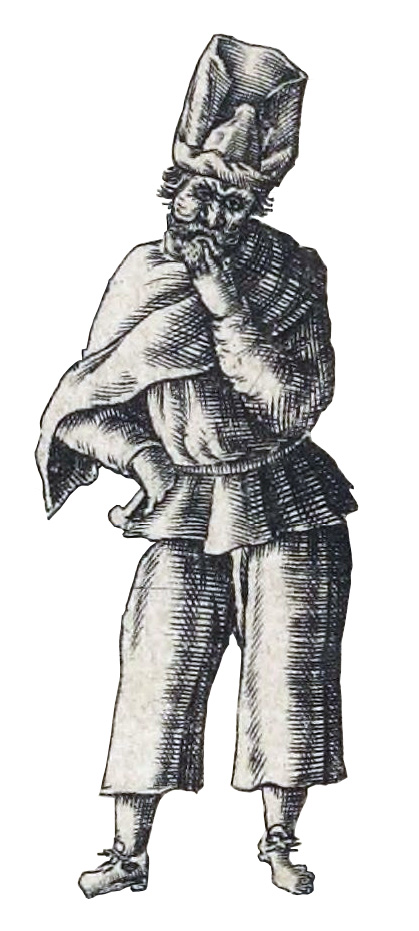
Tabarin, detail from the title page of Inventaire universel des oeuvres de Tabarin, 1622

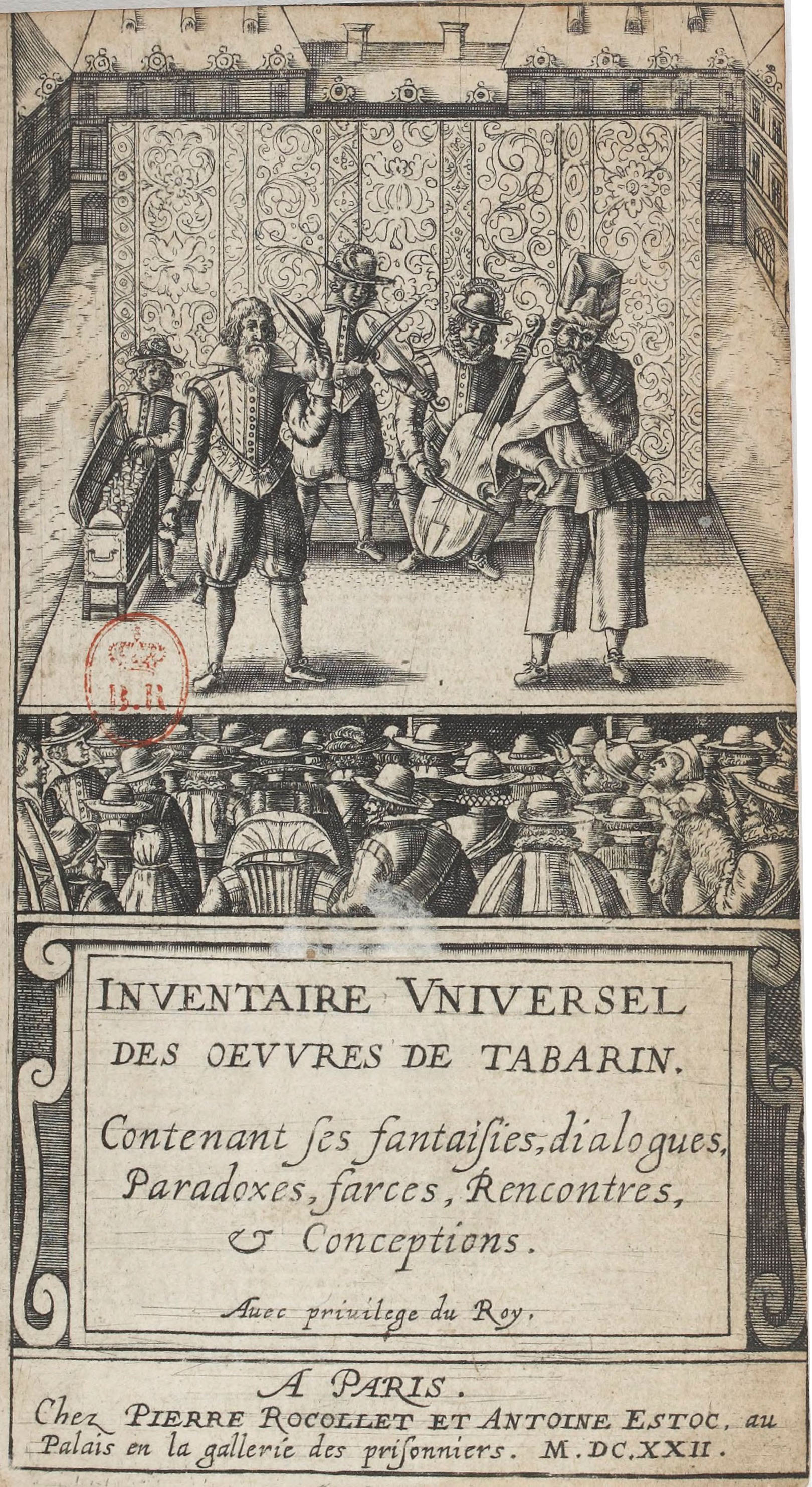
Title page of Inventaire universel des oeuvres de Tabarin, 1622

Tabarin was the street name of Anthoine Girard (c. 1584 – August 16, 1633), the most famous Parisian street charlatan of his day, who amused his audiences in the Place Dauphine by farcical dialogue with his brother Philippe (as Mondor), with whom he reaped a golden harvest by the sale of quack medicines for several years after 1618. Street theatre was popular theatre, on an improvised stage with a curtain backdrop, to the music of a hurdy-gurdy and a set of viols. More formal contemporary performances were confined to the royal court or to the Hotel de Bourgogne, overseen by the medieval guild that had the monopoly of theatrical performances in Paris.

A contemporary woodcut shows Tabarin in the dress of a clown, but with a gallant moustache and pointed beard, carrying a wooden sword, like his distant puppet descendant Mr. Punch, — which would trip him up— and wearing a soft grey felt hat capable of assuming countless amusing shapes in his deft fingers. Tabarin from French tabard denotes a short cloak of the kind the commedia dell'arte figure Scaramouche wears.

In more elaborate weekly performances others appeared, notably his wife. In these he based his bawdy jokes on the stock situations of commedia dell'arte troupes, which were amusing the French court at the time, brought up to date for Parisians by running banter of topical allusions and knowing local jokes, based on his original gifts for improvisation. The Girard brothers retired about 1628, purchased a seigneurie and lived out their retirement as country gentlemen near Orléans.

Numerous farces and dialogues were credited to him, and long series of cheap leaflets purporting to be his complete works began to appear as early as 1622. Stock characters besides Tabarin, with his famous felt hat Le Chapeau de Tabarin that could be rolled into a variety of shapes to aid his characterizations (see "Chapeaugraphy"), were two old men Lucas and Piphagne whose echoes still resound in the Barber of Seville, and the witty and self-reliant ladies Francisquine and Isabella. A Falstaffian old soldier (based on the miles gloriosus of Roman comedy) named Capitaine Rodomonte, gave his name to the rodomontade of French theater, an extravagantly inflated and drawn-out tirade of deluded self-confidence, vain threats and invective. Both Molière and La Fontaine, who praised him, were influenced by the Tabarin tradition of coarse quick repartee, and he was also well spoken of, long after he was gone, by Boileau and Voltaire.

Tabarin became the French eponym of any comic performer of a street booth. It was taken up as a cabaret that was made immortal by a Paul Colin poster which epitomized the 1920s. With this history Tabarin is the foundation of Bal Tabarin. A famous cabaret business.

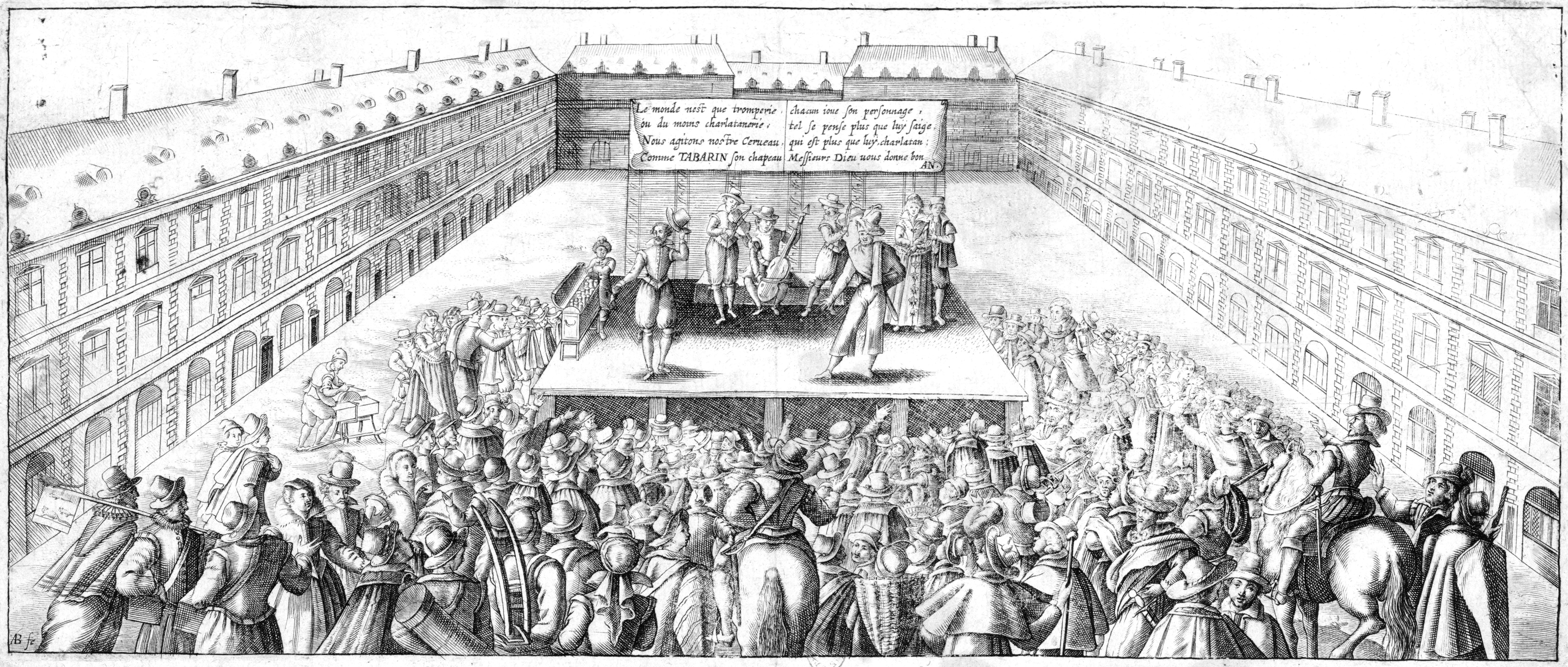
Street theatre of Tabarin, engraved by Abraham Bosse

== Publications ==
- Inventaire universel des oeuvres de Tabarin, attributed to Tabarin, published in 1622
