= Martin Gardner bibliography =

Works of American writer (1914–2010)

In a publishing career spanning 80 years (1930–2010), popular mathematics and science writer Martin Gardner (1914–2010) authored or edited over 100 books and countless articles, columns and reviews.

All Gardner's works were non-fiction except for two novels – The Flight of Peter Fromm (1973) and Visitors from Oz (1998) – and two collections of short pieces – The Magic Numbers of Dr. Matrix (1967, 1985) and The No-Sided Professor (1987).

== Books ==
=== Original works ===
- Match-ic (1936), Illus. by Nelson C. Hahne;Ireland Magic Company.
- Here's New Magic: An Array of New and Original Magic Secrets (1937) "by Joe Berg" [actually ghostwritten by Gardner], Illus. by Nelson C. Hahne; Chicago: Privately printed.
- 12 Tricks with a Borrowed Deck (1940), Ireland Magic Company, illust. by Harlan Tarbell, intro. by Paul Rosini.
- After the Dessert (1941), Max Holden, illust. by Nelson Hahne.
- Cut the Cards (1942), Max Holden, illust. by Nelson Hahne.
- Over the Coffee Cups (1949), Tulsa: Montandon Magic, illust. by the author (close-up magic, including "dinner-table tricks and gags")
- In the Name of Science: An Entertaining Survey of the High Priests and Cultists of Science, Past and Present (1952), G. P. Putnam's Sons
  - Republished (revised & expanded) as Fads and Fallacies in the Name of Science (1957), Mineola, New York: Dover Publications; ISBN 0-486-20394-8.
- Mathematics, Magic, and Mystery (1956), Mineola, New York: Dover Publications, ISBN 0-486-20335-2.
- Logic Machines and Diagrams (1958), McGraw-Hill: New York
  - Republished (1968) as Logic Machines, Diagrams, and Boolean Algebra; Dover Publications, Inc.
  - 2nd edition (1983) as Logic Machines and Diagrams with introduction by Donald Michie, University of Chicago Press.
- Mathematical Puzzles (1961), New York: Thomas Y. Crowell (Illust. by Anthony Ravielli).
  - Reprinted w/corrections in 1986 as Entertaining Mathematical Puzzles, Dover; ISBN 0-486-25211-6.
- Relativity for the Million (1962); New York: MacMillan Company (Illust. by Anthony Ravielli).
  - Revised/updated 1976 as The Relativity Explosion New York: Vintage Books, ISBN 0-394-72104-7.
  - Revised/enlarged 1997 as Relativity Simply Explained, New York: Dover; ISBN 0-486-29315-7.
- The Ambidextrous Universe: Mirror Asymmetry and Time-Reversed Worlds (1964)
  - 2nd edition, 1969.
  - 3rd edition, 1990 as The New Ambidextrous Universe: Symmetry and Asymmetry from Mirror Reflections to Superstrings; W.H. Freeman & Company.
  - 3rd edition, Revised, 2005, Dover; ISBN 0-486-44244-6.
- Never Make Fun of a Turtle, My Son (1969), Simon & Schuster (poems; illust. by John Alcorn)
- The Flight of Peter Fromm (1973), Los Altos, California: William Kaufmann, Inc. Prometheus Books (novel).
- Confessions of a Psychic: The Secret Notebooks of Uriah Fuller (1975), Teaneck, New Jersey: Karl Fulves.
- Aha! Insight (1978), W.H. Freeman & Company; ISBN 0-7167-1017-X
- Further Confessions of a Psychic: The Secret Notebooks of Uriah Fuller (1980), Teaneck, New Jersey: Karl Fulves; 70 pp.
- Aha! Gotcha: Paradoxes to Puzzle and Delight (1982), (Series: Tools for Transformation); W.H. Freeman & Company; ISBN 0-7167-1361-6
- The Whys of a Philosophical Scrivener (1983; Revised 1999 edition by St. Martin's Griffin; ISBN 0-312-20682-8.)
- Baffling Brainteasers (1983); Davis Publications.
- The Wreck of the Titanic Foretold? (1986)
  - Revised 1998 edition, Prometheus Books.
- How Not to Test a Psychic: Ten Years of Remarkable Experiments with Renowned Clairvoyant Pavel Stepanek (1989), Prometheus Books
- The Healing Revelations of Mary Baker Eddy (1993), Prometheus Books
- My Best Mathematical and Logic Puzzles (1994), Dover; ISBN 0-486-28152-3.
- A Die of Another Color (1995); Karl Fulves (Illust. by Joseph K. Schmidt).
- Urantia: The Great Cult Mystery (1995), Prometheus Books; ISBN 0-87975-955-0
- The Universe in a Handkerchief: Lewis Carroll's Mathematical Recreations, Games, Puzzles, and Word Plays (1996), Springer-Verlag
- Match Magic: More Than Seventy Impromptu Tricks With Matches (1998), Piccadilly Books.
- Visitors from Oz (1998), St. Martin's Press; ISBN 0-312-19353-X (novel).
- The Colossal Book of Wordplay (2010), with Ken Jennings; Puzzlewright.
- Undiluted Hocus-Pocus: The Autobiography of Martin Gardner (2014); Princeton University Press

=== Collected columns, articles and reviews ===
- The Scientific American Book of Mathematical Puzzles and Diversions (1959) (Note: Collected columns from the "Mathematical Games" series in Scientific American.)
  - Reprinted in 1988 as Hexaflexagons and Other Mathematical Diversions: The First Scientific American Book of Puzzles and Games, University of Chicago Press, ISBN 0-226-28254-6.
- The Second Scientific American Book of Mathematical Puzzles and Diversions (1961)
- Martin Gardner's New Mathematical Diversions from Scientific American (1966), Simon & Schuster.
- The Numerology of Dr. Matrix: The Fabulous Feats and Adventures in Number Theory, Sleight of Word, and Numerological Analysis (Literary, Biblical, Political, Philosophical and Psychonumeranalytical) of That Incredible Master Mind (1967), Simon & Schuster.
  - Reprinted/expanded as The Incredible Dr. Matrix: The World's Greatest Numerologist (1976), Charles Scribner's Sons; ISBN 0-684-14669-X.
  - Reprinted/expanded as The Magic Numbers of Dr. Matrix (1985); Prometheus Books; LCCN 84-43183, ISBN 0-87975-281-5 (cloth), 0-87975-282-3 (paper).
- Unexpected Hangings, and Other Mathematical Diversions (1968), Simon & Schuster.
- The Sixth Scientific American Book of Mathematical Puzzles and Diversions (1971), Simon & Schuster
- Mathematical Carnival (1975), Vintage Books.
- Mathematical Magic Show (1977), Vintage.
- Mathematical Circus (1979), Vintage.
- Science Fiction Puzzle Tales (1981), (Note: Collected columns from Gardner's series of "puzzle tales" in Asimov's Science Fiction magazine.) Random House (Foreword by Isaac Asimov)
  - Reprinted as Mathematical Puzzle Tales (2000), Mathematical Association of America ISBN 0-88385-533-X.
- Science: Good, Bad, and Bogus (1981), Prometheus Books; ISBN 0-87975-573-3 (paperback), ISBN 0-87975-144-4 (hardback), ISBN 0-380-61754-4 (Avon pocket paperback)
- Order and Surprise (1983), Prometheus Books, ISBN 0-87975-219-X
- Wheels, Life, and Other Mathematical Amusements (1983), W. H. Freeman & Co. ISBN 0-7167-1589-9
- Puzzles from Other Worlds (1984), Vintage
- Knotted Doughnuts and Other Mathematical Entertainments (1986), W. H. Freeman & Co. ISBN 0-7167-1799-9.
- Riddles of the Sphinx and other Mathematical Puzzle Tales (1987), Mathematical Association of America, ISBN 0-88385-632-8
- Time Travel and Other Mathematical Bewilderments (1987), W.H. Freeman & Company; ISBN 0-7167-1925-8
- The No-Sided Professor and Other Tales of Fantasy, Humor, Mystery, and Philosophy (1987), Prometheus Books; ISBN 0-87975-390-0. (26 short stories, 2 poems)
- The New Age: Notes of a Fringe Watcher (1988), (Note: Collected columns from the "Notes of a Fringe Watcher" series in Skeptical Inquirer.) Prometheus Books; ISBN 0-87975-432-X
- Gardner's Whys & Wherefores (1989), University of Chicago Press.
- Penrose Tiles to Trapdoor Ciphers (1989), W. H. Freeman & Co. ISBN 0-7167-1987-8.
- Fractal Music, Hypercards and More (1991), W. H. Freeman
- On the Wild Side: The Big Bang, ESP, the Beast 666, Levitation, Rainmaking, Trance-Channeling, Seances and Ghosts, and More... (1992), Prometheus Books; ISBN 0-87975-713-2
- The Encyclopedia of Impromptu Magic (1985), Magic, Inc (574 pgs). (Note: Collects Gardner's contributions to Hugard's Magic Monthly during the 1950s. Subsequent editions include new material.)
  - 2nd edition (1993), as Martin Gardner Presents; Kaufman and Greenberg (415 pgs).
  - 3rd edition (2015), as Impromptu; The Miracle Factory (864 pgs), with Todd Karr.
- Weird Water & Fuzzy Logic: More Notes of a Fringe Watcher (1996), Prometheus Books; ISBN 1-57392-096-7
- The Night Is Large: Collected Essays, 1938-1995 (1997), St. Martin's Griffin; ISBN 0-312-16949-3
- Last Recreations: Hydras, Eggs, and other Mathematical Mystifications (1997), Springer Verlag; ISBN 0-387-94929-1
- Martin Gardner's Table Magic (1998), Dover; ISBN 0-486-40403-X
- From the Wandering Jew to William F. Buckley, Jr.: On Science, Literature, and Religion (2000), Prometheus Books; ISBN 1-57392-852-6
- Did Adam and Eve Have Navels?: Debunking Pseudoscience (2001), W.W. Norton & Company; ISBN 0-393-32238-6.
- A Gardner's Workout: Training the Mind and Entertaining the Spirit (2001), ISBN 1-56881-120-9. (collection of articles and reviews that Gardner published from 1984 to 2000)
- The Colossal Book of Mathematics: Classic Puzzles, Paradoxes, and Problems (2001), W.W. Norton & Company; ISBN 0-393-02023-1 (a "best of" collection)
- Are Universes Thicker Than Blackberries?: Discourses on Gödel, Magic Hexagrams, Little Red Riding Hood, and Other Mathematical and Pseudoscientific Topics (2003), ISBN 0-393-05742-9
- Dana Scott Richards, editor (2006), The Colossal Book of Short Puzzles and Problems (2006), W.W. Norton & Company; ISBN 0-393-06114-0.
- The Jinn from Hyperspace: And Other Scribblings—both Serious and Whimsical (2007), Prometheus Books; ISBN 1-59102-565-6
- The Fantastic Fiction of Gilbert Chesterton: Essays on His Novels and Short Stories (2008), Shelburne, Ontario: Battered Silicon Dispatch Box; ISBN 978-1-55246-803-6 (Collection of previously published material).
- When You Were a Tadpole and I was a Fish and other Speculations about This and That (2009), Hill and Wang; ISBN 0-8090-8737-5

=== As editor/annotator ===
- Great Essays in Science (1957)
  - Revised in 1984 as The Sacred Beetle and Other Great Essays in Science, Prometheus Books; ISBN 0-87975-257-2.
- The Wizard of Oz and Who He Was (1957; edited w/ Russel B. Nye), Michigan State University Press
  - Revised edition, 1994; Michigan State University Press.
- Best Mathematical Puzzles of Sam Loyd (1959), New York: Dover. (Sometimes cited as "Volume 1".)
- Mathematical Puzzles of Sam Loyd, Volume 2 (1960), New York: Dover. (Also published in the same year as More Mathematical Puzzles of Sam Loyd)
- The Annotated Alice (1960), New York: Bramhall House Clarkson Potter. LCCN 60-7341 (no ISBN)
- Oddities and Curiosities of Words and Literature (1961) by C.C. Bombaugh, Dover.
- The Annotated Snark (1962), New York: Simon & Schuster.
  - 2nd edition, 1974.
  - Revised in 1981 as The Hunting of the Snark: A Centennial Edition; Los Altos, California: William Kaufmann; Includes "The Designs of the Snark" by Charles Mitchell and a bibliography by Selwyn Goodacre.
  - Reprinted/revised in 2006 as The Annotated Hunting of the Snark: The Definitive Edition, Norton; Intro by Adam Gopnik.
- The Annotated Ancient Mariner (1965) by Samuel Taylor Coleridge, New York: Clarkson Potter.
- Philosophical Foundations of Physics: An Introduction to the Philosophy of Science (1966) by Rudolf Carnap, Basic Books.
  - Republished w/corrections (1995) as An Introduction to the Philosophy of Science, Dover (New foreword).
- Puzzles and Curious Problems by Henry Ernest Dudeney (1967), Charles Scribner's Sons.
  - Expanded as 536 Curious Problems and Puzzles (1995), Barnes and Noble.
- The Annotated Casey at the Bat: A Collection of Ballads about the Mighty Casey (1967); New York: Clarkson Potter.
  - 2nd (1984) edition; Chicago: The University of Chicago Press. ISBN 0-226-28263-5.
  - 3rd (1995) edition; New York: Dover Publications, ISBN 0-486-28598-7.
- Carroll, Lewis, The Wasp in a Wig: A "Suppressed" Episode of 'Through the Looking-glass and What Alice Found There', Lewis Carroll Society of North America/C.N. Potter: Distributed by Crown Publishers, 1977.
- Fujimura, Kobon (1977), The Tokyo Puzzles, Scribners (Tr. by Fumie Adachi).
- The Annotated Innocence of Father Brown (1987), Oxford University Press, ISBN 0-19-217748-6 (Notes by Gardner, on G. K. Chesterton's stories).
- More Annotated Alice (1990), Random House; ISBN 0-394-58571-2 (a "supplement" to The Annotated Alice)
- The Annotated Night Before Christmas: A Collection of Sequels, Parodies, And Imitations of Clement Moore's Immortal Ballad About Santa Claus Edited, with an introduction and notes, by Martin Gardner (1991), Summit Books (Reprinted, Prometheus Books, 1995); ISBN 0-671-70839-2
- Kordemsky, Boris A. (1992), The Moscow Puzzles: 359 Mathematical Recreations (Series: Dover Recreational Math). [Simplified edition of 1956 Russian-language original.]
- Peter Puzzlemaker Returns! More Puzzles for Problem Solvers (1994); Dale Seymour Publications ("Compiled and introduced" by Gardner; no primary author given.)
- Best Remembered Poems (1995), Dover.
- Famous Poems From Bygone Days (1995), Dover.
- Wells, H.G., "The Country of the Blind" and Other Science Fiction Stories (1997 Dover edition), introduction by Gardner for each story. (Series: Dover Thrift Editions)
- Carroll, Lewis, Phantasmagoria (1998), Prometheus Books (satirical poem).
- Thompson, Silvanus P. (1998), Calculus Made Easy, St. Martin's Press; ISBN 0-312-18548-0
- The Annotated Alice: The Definitive Edition (1999), W.W. Norton & Company; ISBN 0-393-04847-0.
- The Annotated Thursday: G. K. Chesterton's Masterpiece, The Man Who Was Thursday by G. K. Chesterton (1999).
- Martin Gardner's Favorite Poetic Parodies (2002), Prometheus Books; ISBN 1-57392-925-5

=== For children ===
- Science Puzzlers (1957), The Viking Press, Scholastic Book Services (Illust. by Anthony Ravielli).
  - Slightly revised in 1981 as Entertaining Science Experiments With Everyday Objects; Dover; ISBN 0-486-24201-3
- The Arrow Book of Brain Teasers (1959), New York: Tab Books.
- Archimedes: Mathematician and Inventor (1966); MacMillan Co. (Illust. by Leonard Everett Fisher)
- Perplexing Puzzles and Tantalizing Teasers (1969), Simon & Schuster.
- Space Puzzles: Curious Questions & Answers About the Solar System (1972), Simon & Schuster.
  - Revised in 1997 as Puzzling Questions About the Solar System, Dover.
- The Snark Puzzle Book (1973), Simon & Schuster.
- More Perplexing Puzzles and Tantalizing Teasers (1977), Simon Pulse
- Codes, Ciphers and Secret Writing (Test Your Code Breaking Skills) (1984), Dover; ISBN 0-486-24761-9
- Classic Brainteasers (1995), Sterling Publishing; ISBN 0-8069-1261-8
- Science Magic: Martin Gardner's Tricks and Puzzles (1997), Sterling Pub. Co.
  - Reprinted as Martin Gardner's Science Magic: Tricks and Puzzles (2011), Dover
- Mind-Boggling Word Puzzles (2001), New York: Sterling Publishing Co. (Illust. by V.G. Myers)
- Smart Science Tricks (2004), Sterling; ISBN 1-4027-0910-2. (About half of the "tricks" are reprinted "Trick of the Month" columns from The Physics Teacher; many of these had also already been reprinted as "Gardner's Corner" columns in Magic.)
- Optical Illusion Play Pack (2008), Sterling (Illust. by Gilbert Ford)
- The Adventures of Humphrey Huckleberry (2009?), Shelburne, Ontario: Battered Silicon Dispatch Box; ISBN 978-1-55246-808-1; (Collection of 8 years of 10 columns per annum from Humpty Dumpty Magazine).
- Mental Magic: Surefire Tricks to Amaze Your Friends (2010), Dover.

=== As contributor ===
- "Speak Roughly", In: Guiliano, Edward (1976), Lewis Carroll Observed, Clarkson N. Potter; Reprinted with additions in Gardner's Order and Surprise (1983).
- Klarner, David A., editor (1981), The Mathematical Gardner, Wadsworth International.
  - Reprinted in 1998 as Mathematical Recreations: A Collection in Honor of Martin Gardner, Dover; ISBN 0-486-40089-1
- "Lord Dunsany", In: Bleiler, E.F., editor (1985), Supernatural Fiction Writers: Fantasy and Horror; New York: Scribner's, pp. 471–478.
- Berlekamp, Elwyn R. and Tom Rodgers, editors (1999), The Mathemagician and Pied Puzzler: A Collection in Tribute to Martin Gardner, A K Peters/CRC Press.
- Wolfe, David and Tom Rodgers, editors (2001), Puzzlers' Tribute: A Feast for the Mind; Foreword by Arthur Clarke, A K Peters/CRC Press.
- Cipra, Barry Arthur, Erik D. Demaine, Martin L. Demaine, and Tom Rodgers, editors (2004), Tribute to a Mathemagician, A K Peters/CRC Press.
- Demaine, Erik D., Martin L. Demaine and Tom Rodgers, editors (2008), A Lifetime of Puzzles: A Collection of Puzzles in Honor of Martin Gardner's 90th Birthday; AK Peters.
- Pegg, Ed Jr., Alan H. Schoen and Tom Rodgers, editors (2009), Mathematical Wizardry for a Gardner; AK Peters.
- Burstein, Mark, editor (2011), A Bouquet for the Gardener: Martin Gardner Remembered, Lewis Carroll Society of North America.
- Henle, Michael and Brian Hopkins, editors (2012), Martin Gardner in the Twenty-First Century (Series: MAA Problem Books), Mathematical Association of America (Eight short works by Gardner & 33 by other authors)

=== Provided introduction, preface, foreword, or afterword only ===
- Alice's Adventures Under Ground by Lewis Carroll: A Facsimile of the 1864 Manuscript (1965), Dover.
- Marks, David and Richard Kammann, (1980, 2nd ed. 2000), The Psychology of the Psychic (Gardner foreword in both editions).
- American Fairy Tales by L. Frank Baum (Gardner intro in 1978 Dover Children's Classics reprint of Baum's 1901 book).
- A Dreamer's Tales, by Lord Dunsany (Gardner foreword to 1979 Owlswick Press reprint of Dunsany's 1910 book).
- Alice in Puzzle-Land: A Carrollian Tale for Children Under Eighty by Raymond M. Smullyan (1982).
- The Fourth Dimension: A Guided Tour of the Higher Universes by Rudy Rucker (1985), Mariner Books (Reprinted in 2014 as The Fourth Dimension: Toward a Geometry of Higher Reality, Dover Publications; Gardner provides foreword in both).
- The Emperor's New Mind: Concerning Computers, Minds, and the Laws of Physics by Roger Penrose (1989)
- The Napoleon of Notting Hill by G.K. Chesterton (New intro by Gardner in 1991 Dover reprint).
- Another Fine Math You've Got Me Into (Series: Martin Gardner Presents) by Ian Stewart (1992).
- The Conquest of Time by H.G. Wells (Prometheus Books; Gardner intro to 1995 reprint of Wells' 1942 book; Series: Great Minds)
- Anticipations of the Reaction of Mechanical and Scientific Progress upon Human Life and Thought, by H. G. Wells (Gardner intro to 1999 Dover reprint of Wells' 1901 book).
- The Annotated Wizard of Oz (2000), edited by Michael Patrick Hearn, New York: W.W. Norton & Company; ISBN 0-393-04992-2.
- Magician's Magic by Paul Curry (Gardner intro to 2003 Dover reprint of Curry's 1965 book).
- Bamboozlers: The Book of Bankable Bar Betchas, Brain Bogglers, Belly Busters & Bewitchery by Diamond Jim Tyler (2008), Diamond Jim Productions; ISBN 0-9676018-1-9.
- The Upside-Down World of Gustave Verbeek (2009), Sunday Press Books; ISBN 0-9768885-7-2.
- Wells, H.G. and Hilaire Belloc, Mr Belloc Objects to 'The Outline of History' (2009), Shelburne, Ontario: Battered Silicon Dispatch Box (Reprint with foreword & epilogue by Gardner).
- The Coloured Lands by G.K. Chesterton (Gardner afterword in 2009 Dover reprint).

== "Mathematical Games": The Scientific American columns ==
=== Collected columns in book form ===
There are fifteen books altogether—what Donald Knuth calls "the Canon"—that encompass Gardner's "Mathematical Games" columns (1956–1981) from Scientific American:

1. The Scientific American Book of Mathematical Puzzles and Diversions (1959); Simon & Schuster
  - Reprinted in 1963 as The First Scientific American Book of Mathematical Puzzles and Diversions, Simon & Schuster
  - Reprinted in 1988 as Hexaflexagons and Other Mathematical Diversions: The Scientific American Book of Puzzles and Games, University of Chicago Press; ISBN 0-226-28254-6.
  - Reprinted in 2008 as Hexaflexagons, Probability Paradoxes, and the Tower of Hanoi: Martin Gardner's First Book of Mathematical Puzzles and Games; (Series: The New Martin Gardner Mathematical Library #1); The Mathematical Association of America/Cambridge University Press.
2. The 2nd Scientific American Book of Mathematical Puzzles & Diversions (1961), Simon & Schuster.
  - Reprinted in 1966 in UK by Pelican Books as More Mathematical Puzzles and Diversions; ISBN 0-14-02-07481.
  - Reprinted in 1987 by the University of Chicago Press; ISBN 0-226-28253-8.
  - Reprinted in 2008 as Origami, Eleusis, and the Soma Cube: Martin Gardner's Mathematical Diversions, (Series: The New Martin Gardner Mathematical Library #2); The Mathematical Association of America/Cambridge University Press.
3. Martin Gardner's New Mathematical Diversions from Scientific American (1966), Simon & Schuster
  - Reprinted and revised in 1995 as New Mathematical Diversions, Mathematical Association of America.
  - Reprinted in 2009 as Sphere Packing, Lewis Carroll, and Reversi: Martin Gardner's New Mathematical Diversions, (Series: The New Martin Gardner Mathematical Library #3); The Mathematical Association of America/Cambridge University Press.
4. The Numerology of Dr. Matrix: The Fabulous Feats and Adventures in Number Theory, Sleight of Word, and Numerological Analysis (Literary, Biblical, Political, Philosophical and Psychonumeranalytical) of That Incredible Master Mind (1967), New York: Simon & Schuster.
  - Reprinted/expanded in 1979 as The Incredible Dr. Matrix, Scribner.
  - Reprinted/expanded in 1985 as The Magic Numbers of Dr Matrix, Prometheus Books; ISBN 0-87975-281-5 / ISBN 0-87975-282-3.
  - Reprint forthcoming as Words, Numbers, and Combinatorics: Martin Gardner on the Trail of Dr. Matrix, (Series: The New Martin Gardner Mathematical Library #9); The Mathematical Association of America/Cambridge University Press.
5. The Unexpected Hanging and Other Mathematical Diversions (1969), Simon & Schuster.
  - Reprinted in 1977 in UK by Pelican Books as Further Mathematical Diversions; ISBN 0-14-02-1996X.
  - Reprinted in 1991 by the University of Chicago Press; ISBN 0-671-20073-9.
  - Reprinted in 2014 as Knots and Borromean Rings, Rep-Tiles, and Eight Queens: Martin Gardner's Unexpected Hanging, (Series: The New Martin Gardner Mathematical Library #4); The Mathematical Association of America/Cambridge University Press.
6. Martin Gardner's Sixth Book of Mathematical Games from Scientific American (1971), W.H. Freeman and Company
  - Revised by the Mathematical Association of America, 2001.
  - Reprint forthcoming as Klein Bottles, Op-Art, and Sliding Block Puzzles: More of Martin Gardner's Mathematical Games, (Series: The New Martin Gardner Mathematical Library #5); The Mathematical Association of America/Cambridge University Press.
7. Mathematical Carnival (1975), Knopf.
  - Revised with foreword by John H. Conway, Mathematical Association of America, 1992.
  - Reprint forthcoming as Sprouts, Hypercubes, and Superellipses: Martin Gardner's Mathematical Carnival, (Series: The New Martin Gardner Mathematical Library #6); The Mathematical Association of America/Cambridge University Press.
8. Mathematical Magic Show (1977), Knopf.
  - Revised with foreword by Ronald L. Graham, Mathematical Association of America, 1990.
  - Reprint forthcoming as Nothing and Everything, Polyominoes, and Game Theory: Martin Gardner's Mathematical Magic Show, (Series: The New Martin Gardner Mathematical Library #7); The Mathematical Association of America/Cambridge University Press.
9. Mathematical Circus (1979), Knopf.
  - Revised with foreword by Donald E. Knuth, Mathematical Association of America, 1992.
  - Reprint forthcoming as Random Walks, Hyperspheres, and Palindromes: Martin Gardner's Mathematical Circus, (Series: The New Martin Gardner Mathematical Library #8); The Mathematical Association of America/Cambridge University Press.
10. Wheels, Life, and Other Mathematical Amusements (1983), W. H. Freeman & Co. ISBN 0-7167-1589-9.
  - Reprint forthcoming as Wheels, Life, and Knotted Molecules: Martin Gardner's Mathematical Amusements, (Series: The New Martin Gardner Mathematical Library #10); The Mathematical Association of America/Cambridge University Press.
11. Knotted Doughnuts and Other Mathematical Entertainments (1986), W.H. Freeman & Co.; ISBN 0-7167-1799-9.
  - Reprint forthcoming as Knotted Donuts, Napier's Bones, and Gray Codes: Martin Gardner's Mathematical Entertainments, (Series: The New Martin Gardner Mathematical Library #11); The Mathematical Association of America/Cambridge University Press.
12. Time Travel and Other Mathematical Bewilderments (1988), W. H. Freeman & Co.; ISBN 0-7167-1925-8.
  - Reprint forthcoming as Tangrams, Tilings, and Time Travel: Martin Gardner's Mathematical Bewilderments, (Series: The New Martin Gardner Mathematical Library #12); The Mathematical Association of America/Cambridge University Press
13. Penrose Tiles to Trapdoor Ciphers (1989), W. H. Freeman & Co.; ISBN 0-7167-1987-8.
  - Reprint forthcoming as Penrose Tiles, Trapdoor Ciphers, and the Oulipo: Martin Gardner's Mathematical Tour, (Series: The New Martin Gardner Mathematical Library #13); The Mathematical Association of America/Cambridge University Press.
14. Fractal Music, Hypercards and More...: Mathematical Recreations from Scientific American (1992), W. H. Freeman & Co.
  - Reprint forthcoming as Fractal Music, Hypercards, and Chaitin's Omega: Martin Gardner's Mathematical Recreations, (Series: The New Martin Gardner Mathematical Library #14); The Mathematical Association of America/Cambridge University Press.
15. Last Recreations: Hydras, Eggs, and other Mathematical Mystifications (1997), Copernicus Books, Springer Verlag; ISBN 0-387-94929-1.
  - Reprint forthcoming as The Last Recreations: Hydras, Eggs, and other Mathematical Mystifications: Martin Gardner's Last Mathematical Recreations, (Series: The New Martin Gardner Mathematical Library #15); The Mathematical Association of America/Cambridge University.

A more detailed list of editions can be found here. An extensive index, by Carl W. Lee, encompassing all 15 books can be found here.

=== CD-ROMs ===
- Martin Gardner's Mathematical Games (2005), Mathematical Association of America; ISBN 0-88385-545-3 (CD-ROM of 15 Gardner books above, encompassing all his "Mathematical Games" columns from Scientific American.)

== Uncollected articles and stories ==
- Gardner, Martin, "Left or Right?" [short story], Esquire, Feb 1951 issue. (actually in Mathenauts edited by Rudy Rucker)
- Chung, Fan, Martin Gardner and Ron Graham, "Steiner Trees on a Checkerboard", Mathematics Magazine 62, 83–96, 1989 (won a Carl B. Allendoerfer award). (actually in Gardner's Workout)
