= Nelson Hahne =

Nelson C. Hahne (December 9, 1908 – October 4, 1970) was a professional illustrator, author and magician. He served as illustrator for numerous magic books, and magic catalogs. He was the resident artist for The Linking Ring magazine for over forty years.

== Works with Hahne illustrations ==
- Ireland Writes a Book (19??)
- Modern Coin Magic (19??)
- Here's Magic (1930), by Joe Berg
- Match-ic (1936), by Martin Gardner; Ireland Magic Company
- Here's New Magic (1937), "by Joe Berg" (actually ghostwritten by Martin Gardner)
- After the Dessert (1941), by Martin Gardner; Max Holden
- Cut the Cards (1942), by Martin Gardner; Max Holden
- Annemann's Practical Mental Effects (1944), by Theodore Annemann (edited by John J. Crimmins Jr.); Max Holden
- Nelson Enterprises catalogs and books.
- Secrets of the Crystal Silence League by Alexander, The Man Who Knows (2019)
