= Al Baker (magician) =

American magician

- Al Baker, portrait published in The Sphinx, April 1944
- Born: Albert Baker; September 4, 1874; Poughkeepsie, New York, U.S.
- Died: October 24, 1951 (aged 77); Brooklyn, New York, U.S.
- Resting place: The Evergreens Cemetery (Nazareth section), Brooklyn/Queens, New York
- Occupations: Magician; Ventriloquist; Author
- Years active: 1895–1951
- Title: Dean of the Society of American Magicians
- Term: 1941–1951
- Spouse: Phoebe Derossier (m. 1898; died 1951)
- Children: 1 (Naomi)

Al Baker (September 4, 1874 – October 24, 1951) was an American professional magician, ventriloquist, author, and prolific inventor of magical effects. Born in Poughkeepsie, New York, Baker enjoyed a diverse performing career that transitioned from his early days in vaudeville to headlining the Chautauqua circuit, and eventually to entertaining at intimate society and club dates. Known for his flawless timing, spontaneous wit, and natural delivery, he was widely regarded by his peers as one of the best humorists in the craft, famously praised by his contemporaries as the "Will Rogers of his profession".

Beyond his performances, Baker was a highly influential thinker and mentor in the magic community who advocated for practicality, naturalness, and simplicity over complex sleight of hand. He invented and marketed numerous original effects that became essential staples of twentieth-century magic. A prominent figure in the New York magic scene, Baker operated a well-known magic shop in Times Square and regularly contributed witty, instructional columns to leading magic periodicals. He also authored several classic instructional books on the art of conjuring, the contents of which were later preserved in the comprehensive 2003 encyclopedic volume, The Secret Ways of Al Baker. In recognition of his mastery and immense contributions to the art, he was honored with the title of Dean of the Society of American Magicians, a position he held from 1941 until his death.

== Early life ==
Baker was born on September 4, 1874, in Poughkeepsie, New York. He was raised at 207 Main Street by his parents, Marie (née Boyd) and Morris Baker, an auctioneer who had immigrated from Prussia. His interest in magic was sparked at age 12 when his father taught him two tricks: tearing a dollar bill and restoring it, and vanishing bird seed from a cup covered by a hat. Baker's lifelong passion for magic was profoundly shaped during his youth in Poughkeepsie when he witnessed a performance by the celebrated magician Alexander Herrmann at the Collingwood Opera House—then, according to Baker, the fourth-largest theater in the United States, and now known as the Bardavon—an experience that inspired him to follow in Herrmann's footsteps; Baker recalled seeing Herrmann perform as many as five times. He later honed his skills by studying Professor Hoffmann's book Modern Magic, a gift from his father, from which he learned the "Baking a Cake and a Hat" trick that became one of his signature effects. Before fully committing to a career in entertainment, Baker worked several trades, including picking grapes, rolling cigars, and operating a souvenir photo studio on the boardwalk at Coney Island.

== Career in vaudeville and Chautauqua ==
Advertisement for the Redpath Chautauqua featuring Al Baker, "Youna," and Billie Pryor, from The Honeoye Falls Times, July 1920

By 1895, at the age of 21, Baker decided to pursue show business professionally. After performing magic in vaudeville for a few seasons, he felt that his act and the acts around him were becoming too mechanical. To diversify his performances, he taught himself ventriloquism and transitioned to the Chautauqua and Lyceum circuits, where he became a major headliner from roughly 1911 to 1928. Over the spring and summer of 1920, Baker toured New York State on the Redpath Chautauqua circuit with juggler "Youna" and blackface comedian Billie Pryor, appearing in Lyndonville, Niagara Falls, Ransomville, Batavia, Honeoye Falls, Cazenovia, Oneonta, and Fulton. Touring extensively across rural America under the management of the Redpath Chautauqua, Baker shared the circuit with fellow Redpath alumni, including a young Edgar Bergen, who was billed as "A Barrel of Fun For Everybody"; the two remained personal friends in later years. In 1927, the Redpath Bureau signed Baker for twelve weeks at $100 per week, a substantial sum for the era.

He toured with a wooden dummy named "Dennis," engaging in spontaneous, witty dialogues, and scenes where the dummy would sing while Baker drank a glass of water without moving his lips.

== The Broadway Magic Shop ==
Advertisement for the Broadway Magic Shop, operated by Al Baker and Martin Sunshine, from The Sphinx magazine, September 1931

In September 1931, Baker partnered with mentalist Martin "Kismet" Sunshine to open the Broadway Magic Shop in the Longacre Building at 1472 Broadway in Times Square. Advertised heavily in The Sphinx magazine as "The Home of New Ideas," the shop became a major hub for magicians and a retail front for Baker's own inventions. Due to Sunshine's new association with the Artists Bureau of the Columbia Broadcasting Company, the pair sold the shop to Ed Willson ("Aladdin") in November 1933.

== Philosophy and performance style ==
Baker was widely recognized as one of the best humorists in magic, famously dubbed the "Will Rogers of his profession" by lyricist Bert Kalmar due to his perfect timing, gentle humor, and natural delivery. Baker advocated for practicality over complexity in magic, once writing in his "Letters to Harold" column: "Doing every sleight in somebody's book to me is like a Rolls Royce without a gas tank. Nice looking—but 'it don't get you nowhere.' In other words, the fewer the moves the better the trick." Baker famously stated that he loved "to find out the weak part of a trick and take the weakness out," a philosophy that guided how he built and refined his routines. He was known for offering fellow performers short, memorable advice, including "Don't run when no one's chasing you" and the observation that "many a good trick is killed with improvements." Baker became part of magic's inner circle, developing effects in collaboration with fellow magicians Dai Vernon and Nate Leipzig, and was closely associated with Paul Fox, Cardini, and Arthur Finley.

== Inventions and innovations ==
A prolific creator, Baker invented and marketed staples of twentieth-century magic, including the Dictionary Test, the Al Baker Slates, a diskless version of the Rice Bowls, the Purse Frame, the Baker-Scope, "Albaka," "Color Vision," The Pack That Cuts Itself, and the Vanishing Salt Trick. He was a pioneer in modern mentalism, helping popularize the center tear technique, and was among the first magicians to publish routines using human hair as invisible thread.

== Published works and literary contributions ==
Al Baker performing a rabbit production, published in The Sphinx, April 1944

Baker was a frequent contributor to magic periodicals. His famous column in The Sphinx, "Letters to Harold," began in July 1930 and took the form of fictional letters to an aspiring magician; a 1944 tribute issue of the magazine described Baker as "a gifted, original, and witty magician."

He authored five highly influential books: Al Baker's Book (1933), Al Baker's Second Book (1935, illustrated by mystery writer Clayton Rawson), Magical Ways and Means (1941), Mental Magic (1949), and Pet Secrets (1951).

=== Manuscripts ===
In addition to his major books, Baker produced several shorter mail-order manuscripts throughout his career, including The Twenty-Five Dollar Manuscript (1920s), Al Baker's Pack (1932), Cardially Yours (1934), Thought Transcriptions (1938), Effects 1, 2 and 3, and Card Trio (1948).

In 2003, his lifetime of work—including his books, manuscripts, magazine articles, and over 200 previously unpublished effects drawn from his private notebooks and those of his friend Eugene Bulson—was compiled by Todd Karr into a 912-page volume titled The Secret Ways of Al Baker.

== Personal life, death, and legacy ==
Baker married Canadian-born Phoebe Derossier in 1898; she survived him, dying on November 29, 1956. By 1918, the couple was living together at 778 Halsey Street in Brooklyn, where Baker listed his occupation as "actor" on his World War I draft registration card. They later lived at 322 88th Street in Brooklyn for much of his later life and had one daughter, Naomi, who married fellow magician Jay Marshall; Marshall later served as Dean of the Society of American Magicians himself, from 1992 to 2005. Naomi and Marshall had two sons, James and Alexander Abbott Marshall ("Sandy")—Baker's grandsons; Sandy was born February 9, 1946. In a quiet echo of the performance that had first inspired him as a boy, Baker later helped devise material for Adelaide Herrmann—Alexander Herrmann's widow, who continued performing under his name after his 1896 death—assembling a small act for her use in her later touring years.

Al Baker and his ventriloquist dummy Dennis

In 1999, Magic magazine named Baker one of "The 100 Most Influential Magicians of the Century," describing him as "an American original—legendary in his own lifetime," and noting that he "rarely turned down a children's birthday show" despite his acclaim.

Baker died at his home in Brooklyn on October 24, 1951, and was interred on November 30, 1951, in the Nazareth section of The Evergreens Cemetery in Brooklyn/Queens. The Al Baker Assembly No. 35 of the Society of American Magicians, located in his hometown of Poughkeepsie, was founded in his honor in 1942 by Poughkeepsie lawyer William Harry Montgomery, along with George Braun and Bernard Schamberg; other charter members included Frank W. Boeckel, Douglas Campbell, Ralph Raymond, Louis Foerschler, and Edwin E. Fitchett. The assembly remains active, meeting monthly (except July and August) as of 2026. In early 1946, Baker returned to Poughkeepsie and performed alongside fellow magicians Al Flosso and Leon Maguire at a benefit show for the Magicians Guild at Arlington High School. The show was MC'd by members of the assembly and drew over a thousand attendees at the afternoon performance and nearly nine hundred more that night, despite what was reported as the worst snowstorm in the city's history.

Remembering his legacy, sleight-of-hand master Dai Vernon noted, "Too much cannot be said in praise of Al Baker—whose great abilities never have been fully appreciated by magicians."
