= Magic shop =

Magic shop may refer to:

- Magic store, an establishment which sells materials for performing magic tricks
- Magic Shop (series), a series of children's books by Bruce Coville
- Magic, Inc. a magic shop in Chicago
- Tannen's Magic Shop, a magic shop in New York City
- "Magic Shop", a song by BTS from the album Love Yourself: Tear
- "The Magic Shop", a 1903 short story by H. G Wells
- The Magic Shop, a recording studio in New York City
