= Lewis Carroll Society of North America =

American learned society

- Abbreviation: LCSNA
- Formation: 1974; 52 years ago
- Type: Literary society
- Purpose: furthering interest in the life and works of Lewis Carroll
- Key people: Mark Burstein; Morton N. Cohen; Martin Gardner; Edward Guiliano; Charlie Lovett; Justin G. Schiller

The Lewis Carroll Society of North America (LCSNA) is a learned, not-for-profit organization dedicated to furthering interest in the life and works of the Rev. Charles L. Dodgson, known to the world as Lewis Carroll, through its publications, and by providing a forum for speakers and scholars, and helping collectors, students, and other Carroll enthusiasts connect with each other.

Founded in Princeton in 1974 by a small group including Morton Cohen, Martin Gardner, Edward Guiliano, Michael Patrick Hearn, and Elizabeth Sewell, the Society has been meeting twice a year since then in cities around the U.S. and Canada.

== Meetings ==
New York City has been a favorite meeting spot, often at the Berol Collection at NYU, but also at the Grolier Club, Columbia and Syracuse Universities, and the Pierpont Morgan and New York Public Libraries . They have convened in locations such as Austin (Harry Ransom Center), Baltimore, Boston, Cambridge (Houghton Library at Harvard), Chicago, Cleveland, Des Moines, Los Angeles (Huntington Museum), Philadelphia (Rosenbach Museum and Library, University of Pennsylvania), San Francisco (SFMOMA), Santa Fe, Seattle, Toronto, Washington DC (Folger Shakespeare Library and the Library of Congress), and Winston-Salem NC. In 2015, they put on a week-long celebration, Alice150, of the 150th anniversary of the publication of Alice’s Adventures in Wonderland, in New York City.

Speakers have included both leading Carroll scholars such as Morton Cohen, Charlie Lovett, Edward Guiliano, Mark Burstein, and Elizabeth Sewell, and Carroll admirers such as Kathryn Beaumont, Christina Björk, Lou Bunin, David del Tredici, Michael Dirda, Adam Gopnik, Adolph Green, Douglas Hofstadter, Iain McCaig, American McGee, Barry Moser, Joyce Carol Oates, Jon Scieszka, William Jay Smith, Raymond Smullyan, and Craig Yoe. Meetings sometimes feature premieres or performances of plays and musicals.

== Publications ==
In 1977, the LCSNA first came to the attention of the world when it published "The Wasp in a Wig," the chapter of Through the Looking-Glass that had been "lost" for over a century. Its ambitious publications program has resulted in publishing or co-publishing Lewis Carroll Observed; The Complete Pamphlets of Lewis Carroll (5 volumes + 1 forthcoming); Alice in a World of Wonderlands: The Translations of Lewis Carroll’s Masterpiece (3 volumes); La Guida di Bragia, a "Ballad Opera for the Marionette Theatre" that Carroll wrote as a young man; Voices from France, Elizabeth Sewell’s analysis of the French reception of Carroll’s work; a new illustrated edition of The Hunting of the Snark; A Bouquet for the Gardener: Martin Gardner Remembered; Соня вь Царствѣ Дива (Sonja in a Kingdom of Wonder), a facsimile of the first (1879) Russian translation; and many others.

Twice a year the LCSNA issues the Knight Letter, an illustrated magazine with substantive articles, reviews, meeting reports, correspondence, and information about Carrollian events, books, products, scholarship, exhibits, media, websites, and the like.
