= Invisible touch =

Invisible touch may refer to:

- Invisible touch (magic trick), a magic trick which gives the illusion a person is being touched seemingly without visible contact
- Invisible Touch, the thirteenth studio album by the English rock band Genesis
- Invisible Touch (song), the title track and first single from the 1986 album of the same name by the English rock band Genesis
