= Science Fiction Puzzle Tales =

Book by Martin Gardner

Science Fiction Puzzle Tales is a book written by Martin Gardner. It is a book of puzzles and short stories that relate to them.

== Reception ==
Dave Langford reviewed Science Fiction Puzzle Tales for White Dwarf #47, and stated that "Many are familiar from Gardner's former books, but he's added new twists to fool smart alecs, and often a puzzle's solution features a variant puzzle, and so on: there are three sets of answers!"

== Reviews ==
- Review by John DiPrete (1982) in Science Fiction Review, Spring 1982
- Review by Dave Langford (1983) in Paperback Inferno, Volume 7, Number 3
