= The Annotated Alice =

1960 book by Martin Gardner

- Author: Martin Gardner
- Illustrator: John Tenniel
- Genre: Annotated edition
- Publisher: Clarkson N. Potter
- Publication date: 1960

The Annotated Alice is a 1960 book by Martin Gardner incorporating the text of Lewis Carroll's major tales, Alice's Adventures in Wonderland (1865) and Through the Looking-Glass (1871), as well as the original illustrations by John Tenniel. It has extensive annotations explaining the contemporary references (including the Victorian poems that Carroll parodies), mathematical concepts, word play, and Victorian traditions (such as the parlor game snap-dragon) featured in the two books.

== History ==
The original book was first published in 1960. It has been reprinted several times and translated into French, Italian, Japanese, Portuguese, Russian, Spanish, German and Hebrew.

In 1990, a sequel, More Annotated Alice, was published. This sequel does not contain the original side notes, and Tenniel's illustrations are replaced by those of Peter Newell. It also contains the "suppressed" chapter "The Wasp in a Wig", which Carroll omitted from the text of Through the Looking-Glass on Tenniel's recommendation.

In 1999, The Definitive Edition was published. It combines the notes from both works and features Tenniel's illustrations in improved quality.

Gardner also compiled a companion volume, The Annotated Snark, dedicated to Carroll's classic nonsense poem The Hunting of the Snark.

In 2015, The Annotated Alice: 150th Anniversary Deluxe Edition was published, combining the previous works of Gardner and expanded by Mark Burstein, president emeritus of the Lewis Carroll Society of North America. It includes features such as more than 100 new or updated annotations, over 100 new illustrations by Salvador Dalí, Beatrix Potter, Ralph Steadman, and 42 other artists and illustrators (in addition to original art by Sir John Tenniel), and a filmography of every Alice-related film by Carroll scholar David Schaefer.

== Editions ==
- The Annotated Alice: Alice's Adventures in Wonderland & Through the Looking Glass by Lewis Carroll, Illustrated by John Tenniel by Martin Gardner (1960), New York, Bramhall House ISBN 0-517-02962-6
- More Annotated Alice by Martin Gardner (1990) ISBN 0-394-58571-2
- The Annotated Alice: The Definitive Edition by Martin Gardner (1998/1999) ISBN 0-393-04847-0
- The Annotated Alice: 150th Anniversary Deluxe Edition by Martin Gardner and Mark Burstein (2015) ISBN 978-0-393-24543-1

== See also ==
- Martin Gardner bibliography
