= Mireille Guiliano =

French-American author

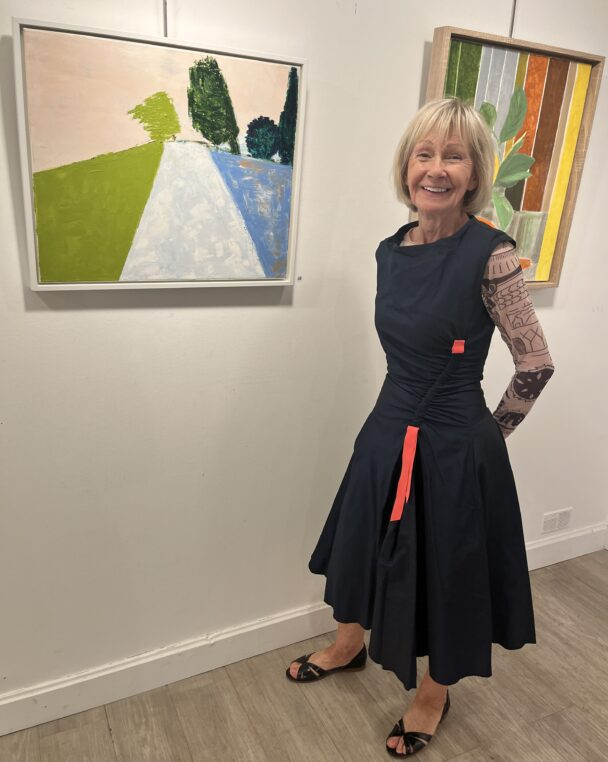
- Born: April 14, 1946 (age 80); Moyeuvre-Grande, Moselle, France
- Education: Sorbonne Nouvelle
- Occupations: Author; Painter; Business executive
- Spouse: Edward Guiliano
- Website: mireilleguiliano.com

Mireille Guiliano (born April 14, 1946) is a French-American author, painter, and former corporate executive at LVMH.

== Early life and education ==
Mireille Guiliano was born in 1946 in Moyeuvre-Grande, France. She spent a year in the United States as an exchange student, then studied French and English literature at Sorbonne Nouvelle from 1966 to 1970, and earned her master's degree. She also graduated from the Institut Supérieur d'Interprétariat et de Traduction (ISIT) as a translator and interpreter.

== Career ==
Guiliano began her career as a multilingual translator, including work for the United Nations. In 1979, she left translation to join the Champagne News and Information Bureau, where she began working with Veuve Clicquot. In 1984, Veuve Clicquot asked her to establish an American subsidiary, Clicquot, Inc. where she became CEO in 1991. During her tenure, she increased the marketshare of the wine from 1% 1984 and to 25% by the end of her tenure. In 2005, she joined the board of the James Beard Foundation. She also served on the executive committee of Moet-Hennessy at LVMH. She retired from Clicquot in 2006 to become a full-time writer.

== Writing ==
Her book French Women Don't Get Fat sold 450,000 copies between December 2004 and April 2005, and was translated into several dozen languages. Overall, it sold more than three million copies within ten years. The New York Times called Guiliano's work "eminently level headed" and noted that she included "reasonable thoughts about nutrition with a general endorsement of joie de vivre." Others have criticized her work for promoting a stereotype of French women, failing to cite scientific literature on the causes of obesity in the United States, and promoting unhealthy attitudes towards food. The San Francisco Chronicle called her first book "a blueprint for building a healthy attitude toward food and exercise," and The Daily Telegraph stated it was "beautifully written." She then published the book French Women for All Seasons in 2006. Publishers Weekly admired the reprise, noting that Guiliano "serves up second helpings of her popular approach… framed with an emphasis on the pleasures of seasonality, local produce and personal style."

In 2009, Guiliano pivoted from cuisine to commerce with Women, Work & the Art of Savoir Faire: Business Sense & Sensibility, part memoir of her Veuve Clicquot years, part primer on navigating boardrooms without surrendering joie de vivre. Publishers Weekly praised "yet another charming dose of no-nonsense advice," adding that Guiliano's liberally scattered French phrases and "confiding entre nous tone lend a sense of chic and fun absent in other leadership and career guides." The Quarterly Review of Wines, tracking the former Champagne executive's literary output, found the volume "offers lots of common sense," commending its emphasis on grace under pressure.

In 2010, Guiliano expanded her French Women franchise with The French Women Don't Get Fat Cookbook, a 288-page sequel that translates her portion-control philosophy into nearly 250 market-driven recipes. In a starred review for Booklist, Gillian Engberg praised the signature voice: "Guiliano employs the warm, personal tone that has earned her so many followers… and her final list of reasons to cook may finally send readers into the kitchen to start following her sensible advice." France Today called the collection "inventive recipes beyond Weight Watchers' wildest dreams" and admired how "Guiliano brings true French flair rather than Spartan earnestness, continually reminding readers that le plaisir is key."

In 2013, Guiliano followed her bestselling food titles with French Women Don't Get Facelifts: The Secret of Aging with Style and Attitude, a conversational mix of memoir, wellness advice and Gallic philosophy that urges readers to replace "youth-obsession" with joie de vivre. Publishers Weekly admired her "charmingly conversational tone" and the "uplifting attitude fix" she prescribes.

In 2014, Guiliano returned to gustatory territory with Meet Paris Oyster: A Love Affair with the Perfect Food, part cultural history, part how-to manual, the book riffs on oyster biology and terroir, shucking etiquette, wine pairings and the ritual of ordering a dozen huîtres fines de claire at a zinc counter, Publishers Weekly called it "breezy and engaging … paean to the French way of living and eating well," praising the mix of cultural lore and practical tips for novices.

== Personal life ==
Mireille is married to Edward Guiliano, President Emeritus of the New York Institute of Technology. Together, they co-founded the Guiliano Global Fellowship Program, which supports university students pursuing research and creative projects. The program has taken place in more than 175 locations around the world.

== Books ==
- French Women Don't Get Fat: The Secret of Eating for Pleasure (2004)
- French Women for All Seasons: A Year of Secrets, Recipes and Pleasure (2006)
- Women, Work & The Art of Savoir Faire (2009)
- The French Women Don't Get Fat Cookbook (2010)
- French Women Don't Get Facelifts: The Secret of Aging with Style and Attitude (2013)
- Meet Paris Oyster: A Love Affair with the Perfect Food (2014)

== See also ==
- French paradox
