= Elizabeth Sewell (writer) =

American novelist

- Born: March 9, 1919; Coonoor, India
- Died: January 12, 2001 (aged 81); Greensboro, North Carolina
- Other name: Margaret Elizabeth Sewell
- Education: Cambridge University, Ph.D.
- Occupations: Poet; novelist; critic; professor
- Organizations: PEN International; American Association of University Professors; Lewis Carroll Society
- Spouse(s): Anthony C. Sirignano, 1971
- Parent(s): Robert Beresford Seymour and Dorothy (Dean) Sewell

Elizabeth Sewell (March 9, 1919 – January 12, 2001) was a British-American critic, poet, novelist, and professor who often wrote about the connections between science and literature. Among her published works were five books of criticism, four novels, three books of poetry, and many short stories, essays, and other work in periodicals in North America and Europe. Of her books, the most widely held by libraries is The Orphic Voice: Poetry and Natural History.

Sewell completed the requirements for a Bachelor of Arts from Cambridge University in 1942. From then to the end of World War II, she worked for the Ministry of Education in London before returning to Cambridge for a Master of Arts (1945) and a Ph.D. (1949) in modern languages. She first visited the United States in 1949 and became a U.S. citizen in 1973. She taught at Vassar College, the University of Notre Dame, the University of North Carolina at Greensboro, Fordham University, Tougaloo College, and Hunter College, and she was a visiting professor or writer at other universities.

She held a Simon Fellowship at Manchester University (1955−57), a Howard Research Fellowship at Ohio State University (1949−50), an Ashley Fellowship at Trent University (1979), and a Presidential Scholarship at Mercer University (1982). In 1981, she won poetry, fiction, and nonfiction awards from the American Academy of Arts and Letters.

Sewell married Anthony C. Sirignano, a university lecturer in classics, in 1971. She died in 2001 in Greensboro, North Carolina.

== Bibliography ==
=== Criticism ===
- The Structure of Poetry (1951) OCLC 1482159
- Paul Valery, the Mind in the Mirror (1952) OCLC 2963111
- The Field of Nonsense (1952) OCLC 1052656
- The Orphic Voice: Poetry and Natural History (1960) OCLC 422085509; introduction by David Schenck, New York : New York Review Books, [2021], ISBN 978-1-68137-218-1
- The Human Metaphor (1964) OCLC 331707
- Lewis Carroll: Voices from France (2008 – published posthumously) OCLC 299241116

=== Essays ===
- To Be a True Poem: Essays (1979) OCLC 469992820

=== Poetry ===
- Poems, 1947−1961 (1962) OCLC 250801018
- Signs and Cities (1968) OCLC 438358
- Acquist (1984) OCLC 10851184

=== Novels ===
- The Dividing of Time (1951) OCLC 1476092
- The Singular Hope (1955) OCLC 12587478
- Now Bless Thyself (1962) OCLC 1450833
- The Unlooked-For (1995) OCLC 35921684

=== Memoir ===
- An Idea (1983) OCLC 9370832

=== Other ===
- For Love (1980) OCLC 5999935

Sewell's papers, including manuscripts, correspondence, research, diaries, audio, and other material, are on file in the Howard Gotlieb Archival Research Center at Boston University.
