= Joe Berg =

American professional magician

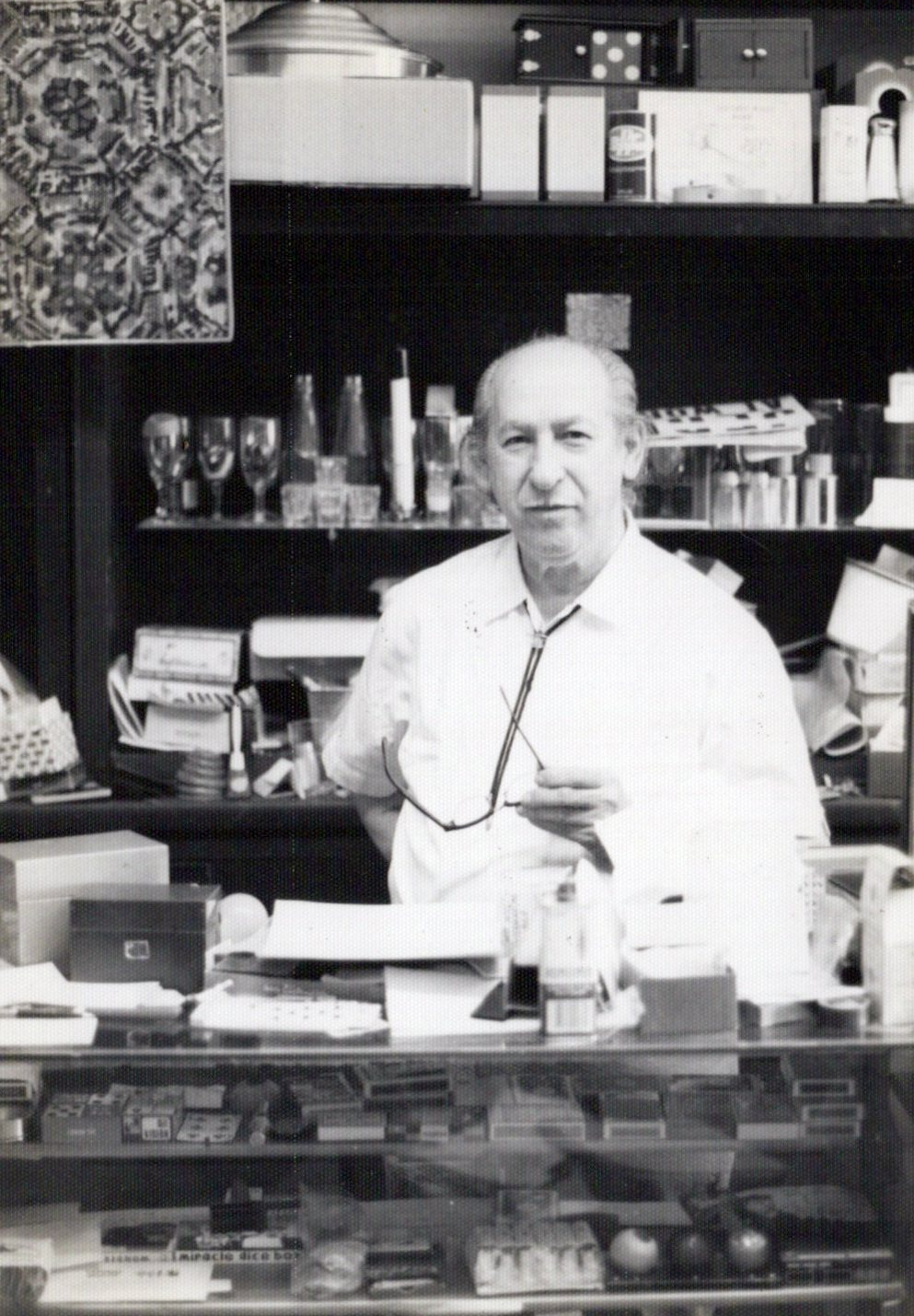
- Joe Berg in his magic shop 1977
- Born: 1903; Pinsk, Russian Empire
- Died: 1984 (aged 80–81)
- Occupation: Magician

Joe Berg (1903–1984) was a professional magician and magic dealer who lived and worked in Chicago, Illinois and Hollywood, California.

Berg was born in Pinsk, Russian Empire (now Belarus) and immigrated to the United States with his parents in 1914. He supplied magic effects and props to such noteworthy entertainers as Harry Houdini, Harry Blackstone Sr. and Howard Thurston among others, and self-published books on magic. His brother, Hy Berg (1908-1982), was also a magician.

== Affiliations/published memoirs ==
On the autobiographical section of his web site, the semi-professional magician, Manyfingers Hostetler comments about visiting Joe's shop in California during the 1960s.

== Works ==
- Here's Magic (1930), Intro by Dr. Harlan Tarbell, Illus. by Nelson C. Hahne
- Here's New Magic: An Array of New and Original Magic Secrets (1937), Illus. by Nelson C. Hahne; ghostwritten by Martin Gardner
- The Berg Book

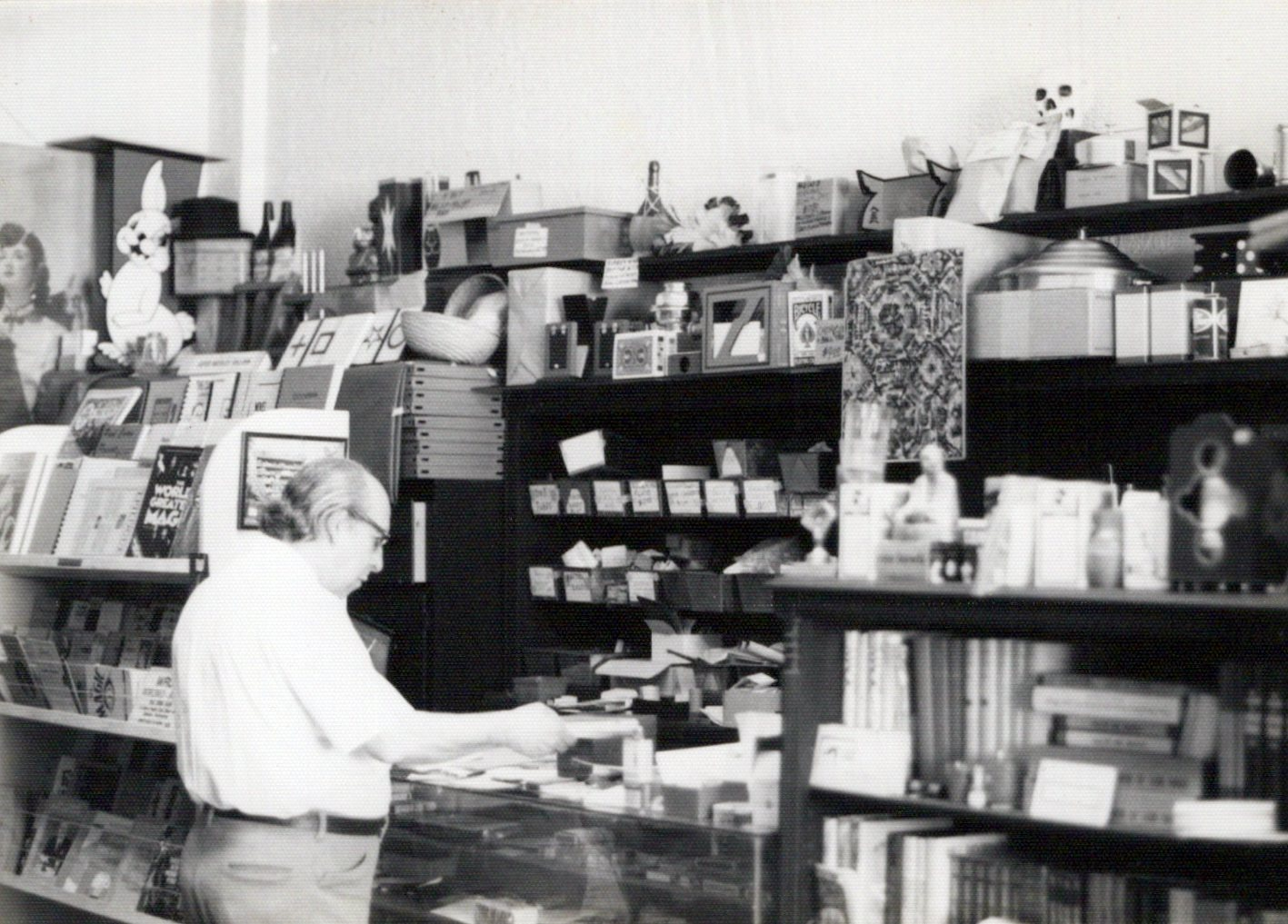

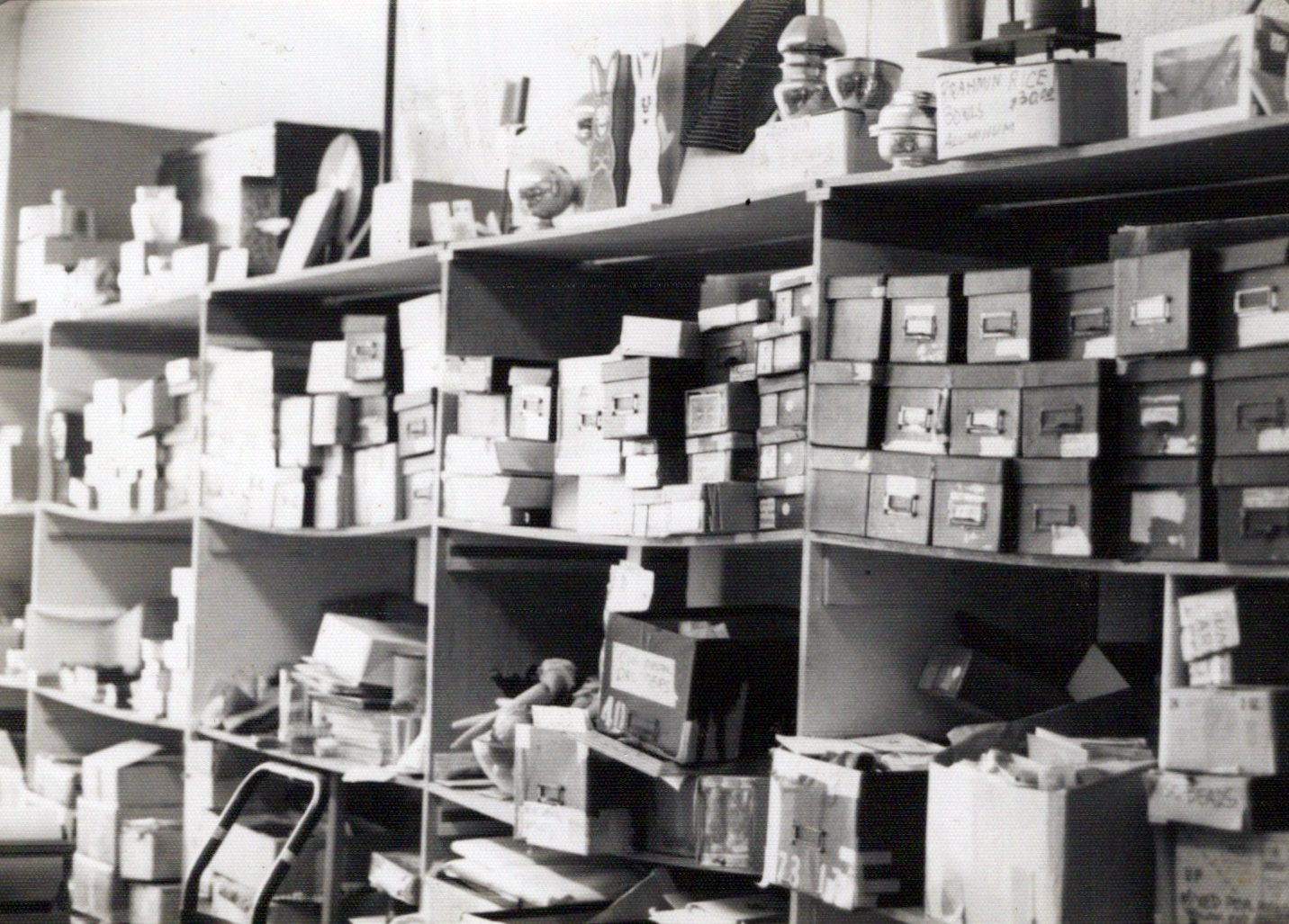
