= Jay Marshall (magician) =

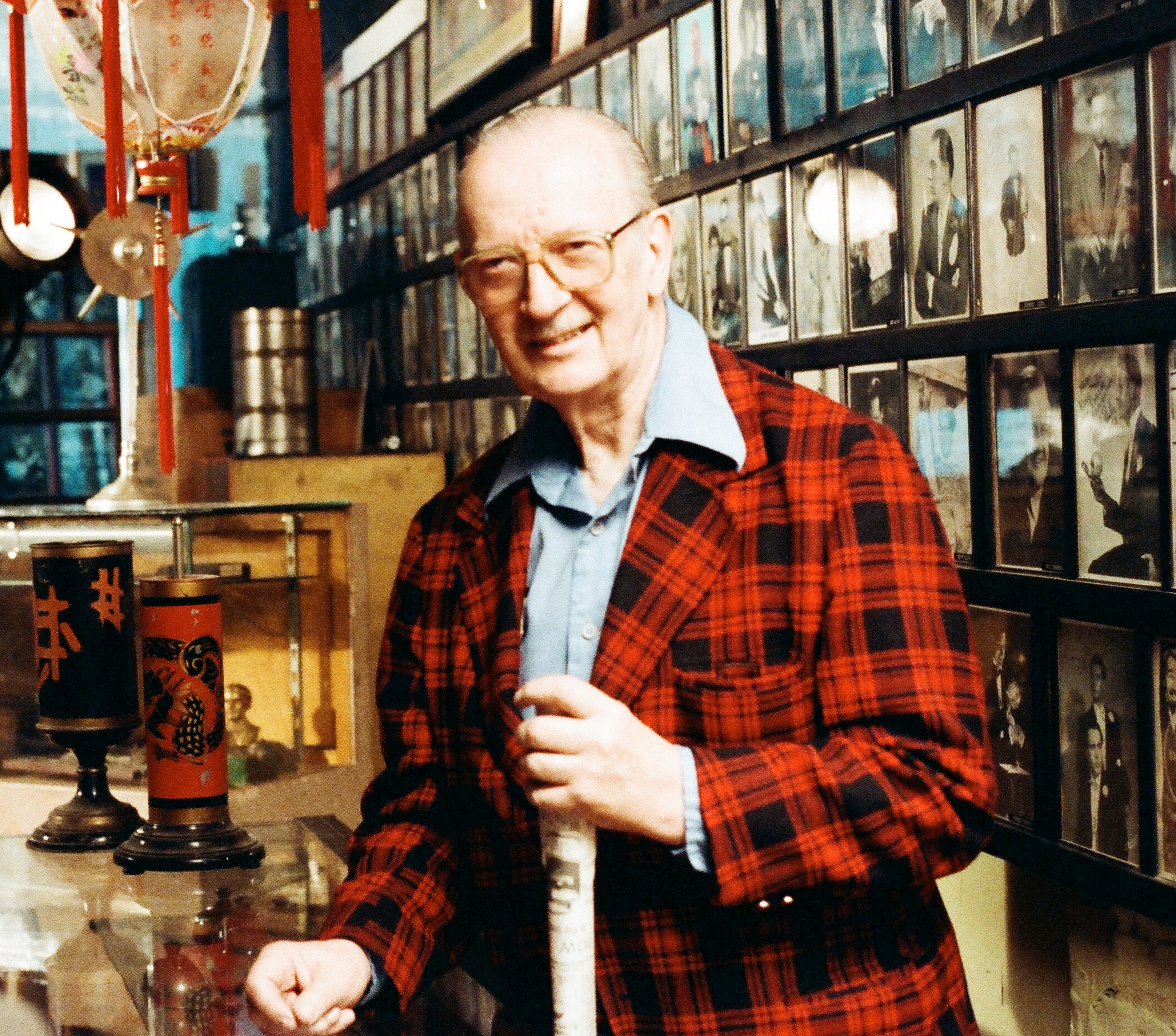
Appearing on British television series The Secret Cabaret

Jay Marshall (James Ward Marshall) (August 29, 1919 – May 10, 2005) was an American magician and ventriloquist.

== Early life and career ==
According to the Chicago Tribune, his interest in magic started when he was six. As a youngster, he saw performances by Thurston and Houdini. In later years, he admitted to dozing off in the midst of Houdini's show. After only a year at college, he went on to be a professional entertainer instead, initially working out of Boston. He later moved to New York City where he met Naomi Baker, daughter of Al Baker, then Dean of American Magicians. Naomi married Marshall and they had two sons, James and Alexander ("Sandy").

During World War II, Marshall was "island hopping" in the Pacific to entertain military personnel in USO shows. He became tired of taking his elaborate ventriloquist's dummy called Henry with him, so he decided to use a white glove and some bunny ears to turn his left hand into his dummy, "Lefty". Marshall often described the transition from his use of a traditional vent dummy to the development of his glove puppet rabbit commenting that the "dummy wouldn't carry the suitcase." Originally made from a khaki army glove, when Marshall was discharged from the army, he replaced it with a white dress glove. While performing in Las Vegas, at the suggestion of one of Marshall's friends, the puppet was further transformed into a rabbit by affixing two fingers from a separate glove to it, thus forming a pair of perky ears.

Over his 60-year career he appeared on The Ed Sullivan Show 14 times together with his glove puppet rabbit dummy, "Lefty". He also played the New York Palace and London's Palladium. Marshall was the opening act for performers like Frank Sinatra, Milton Berle and Liberace. He was the first act to open for Sinatra in Las Vegas. In Marshall's later years, he was honored with the title of "Dean of American Magicians" by the Society of American Magicians.

== Personal ==
Marshall was born in Abington, Massachusetts. He spent a year at Bluefield College in Virginia. In the 1950s, Marshall moved to Chicago and married fellow magician and magic dealer Frances Ireland. Together they operated the Ireland Magic Company at 109 North Dearborn St. in the Chicago Loop. In 1963, the firm was relocated to the North side of Chicago at 5082 North Lincoln Ave., and renamed it Magic Inc. Marshall's reputation as an all-knowing historian of stage magic, vaudeville and entertainment grew through the years, as did his legendary collection of books, posters and assorted ephemera on a wide range of subjects. He died at the Swedish Covenant Hospital in Chicago after a series of heart attacks. He was 85 and is survived by his son Alexander; another son, James; a sister, Marjorie Bamman; five grandchildren; and five great-grandchildren.

James Randi remembers Jay Marshall during the JREF Amazing Adventure 4, March 8–15, 2009. Randi describes how Marshall was an expert at taking advantage of an opportunity and gives the example of when Lefty ate a fly. Randi's anecdote begins with "a fly came into the spotlight..."
