= Charlie Lovett =

American dramatist

Charlie Lovett (born 1962 in Winston-Salem, NC) is an American novelist, podcast producer, children's playwright and expert on the works and life of Lewis Carroll. He has the world's largest collection of Carollean memorabilia and was twice president of the Lewis Carroll Society of North America.

== Life and career ==
Charlie Lovett was born in Winston-Salem, North Carolina in 1962. He got a B.A. in theatre at Davidson College in 1984 and then went into the antiquarian book business and became interested in the works of Lewis Carroll. He got a Master of Fine Arts degree in writing at Vermont College of Fine Arts in 1997. In 2003 he became a member of the Grolier Club the oldest and largest club for bibliophiles in North America.

Two of his books draw on his own experience as an antiquarian bibliophile: The Bookman’s Tale and First Impressions: A Novel of Old Books, Unexpected Love, and Jane Austen. The Bookman’s Tale made the New York Times best seller list. In 1999 he wrote Love, Ruth: A Son's Memoir about his mother Ruth Cander Lovett who was the great-granddaughter of Asa Griggs Candler the founder of Coca-Cola; Maya Angelou called this book "tender and sensitive and true." More than 5000 productions of his children's plays have been performed all over the world.

He hosts the podcast "Inside the Writer’s Studio."

== Lewis Carroll ==
After graduation from Davidson in 1984 Charlie Lovett was captivated by the works of Lewis Carroll, especially Alice’s Adventures in Wonderland. He began collecting Carrollian memorabilia and did research which led him to write five books about Carroll and to serve as president of the Lewis Carroll Society of North America. He has lectured on Carroll all over the world including at Oxford University, Harvard and UCLA.

Lovett has an enormous collection of Carrollian literature, all documented in a book he wrote in 1990 with his first wife Stephanie. In 1994, he and Stephanie, who also served twice as president of Lewis Carroll Society, hosted The Second International Lewis Carroll Conference, in Winston-Salem. This resulted in a book, Proceedings of The Second International Lewis Carroll Conference, which he edited.

In 2015 he wrote a new introduction for Penguin Classics’s 150th anniversary edition of Alice’s Adventures in Wonderland and Through the Looking-Glass. That same year he curated Alice Live!, a major exhibition of Lewis Carroll and Alice memorabilia at the New York Public Library for the Performing Arts at Lincoln Center.

== Foundation ==
In 1992 Charlie founded the Lovett Foundation which is dedicated to independent thinking in pursuit of a culturally diverse, rational and harmonious society. He and his second wife Janice are on the board.

== Selected works ==
Non-fiction

- Lewis Carroll Among His Books: A Descriptive Catalogue of the Private Library of Charles L. Dodgson, ISBN 0786421053
- Lewis Carroll and the Press, Oak Knoll/The British Library, (1999), as "Charles Lovett", ISBN 1884718876
- Alice on Stage, Meckler (1990), ISBN 0313276811
- Lewis Carroll's Alice: An Annotated Checklist of the Lovett Collection, Meckler (1990), with Stephanie Lovett, ISBN 0887361668
- Proceedings of the second International Lewis Carroll Conference, Winston-Salem, North Carolina, June 9–12, 1994, ISBN 0930326105
- Sparrow Through the Hall: A Pilgrimage Through British Christianity, Kingham Tree (2002), ISBN 0971977496
- Everybody's Guide to Book Collecting, Write Brain (1993), ISBN 0963784080
- Lewis Carroll's England, White Stone Publishing (1998), ISBN 0904117146
- Alice’s Adventures in Wonderland and Through the Looking-Glass, 150Th-Anniversary Edition (Penguin Classics Deluxe Edition) By Lewis Carroll, Illustrated by John Tenniel, Introduction by Charlie Lovett, ISBN 9780143107620
- Love, Ruth: A Son's Memoir, Callanwolde Guild (1999), ISBN 0967204046

Novels

- First Impressions, ISBN 0143127721
- Escaping Dreamland: A Novel, ISBN 1982629401
- The Program, ISBN 1597190136
- The Bookman’s Tale, ISBN 9780143125389
- The Lost Book of the Grail, ISBN 0399562532
- The Further Adventures of Ebenezer Scrooge, ISBN 0143109855
- The Fat Lady Sings, ISBN 1597190306

Children's plays

- Becoming Shakespeare
- The Emperor’s Birthday Suit
- Frogspell
- A Hairy Tale
- Hairy Tale Rock
- Little Miss Gingerbread
- Porridgegate
- A Super Groovy Night’s Dream
- Supercomics
- Twinderella
- Twinderella — The Musical

=== Contributor ===
- Encounters with Jane Austen: Celebrating 250 Years. (2025)
