= Wheels, Life and Other Mathematical Amusements =

1983 book by Martin Gardner

- Author: Martin Gardner
- Publication date: 1983

Wheels, Life and Other Mathematical Amusements is a book by Martin Gardner published in 1983. The Basic Library List Committee of the Mathematical Association of America has recommended its inclusion in undergraduate mathematics libraries.

== Contents ==
Wheels, Life and Other Mathematical Amusements is a book of 22 mathematical games columns that were revised and extended after being previously published in Scientific American. It is Gardner's 10th collection of columns, and includes material on Conway's Game of Life, supertasks, intransitive dice, braided polyhedra, combinatorial game theory, the Collatz conjecture, mathematical card tricks, and Diophantine equations such as Fermat's Last Theorem.

== Reception ==
Dave Langford reviewed Wheels, Life and Other Mathematical Amusements for White Dwarf #55, and stated that "Here too are revisions of the three famous pieces on Conway's solitaire game Life, which has absorbed several National Debts' worth of computer time since 1970. Fascinating." The book was positively reviewed in several other mathematics and science journals.
