= Invisible touch (magic trick) =

Magic trick

The invisible touch also known as psychokinetic touch or PK Touch is a magic trick where a mentalist or magician creates an illusion where a person feels they are being touched with seemingly no visual confirmation of contact to the participants.

== Method ==
Invisible touch is a prop based trick which requires a magician to use an invisible thread, a clear elastic thread which is difficult for the naked eye to see even in close proximity. The magician may wave their hand around the mark with no visual cues of contact or touch a different person only to have a visually untouched person feel the effects.

This trick has been performed by illusionists and mentalists including Derren Brown, David Blaine and others.

== See also ==
- Mental magic
- Sleight of hand
- Street magic
- Terms
