= Irving Joshua Matrix =

Fictional character created by Martin Gardner

Irving Joshua Matrix — previously known as Irving Joshua Bush and commonly known as Dr. (I. J.) Matrix — is a fictitious polymath scientist, scholar, cowboy, and entrepreneur who made extraordinary contributions to perpetual motion engineering, Biblical cryptography and numerology, pyramid power, pentagonal meditation, extra-sensory perception, psychic metallurgy, and a number of other topics. He is an accomplished prestidigitator and a mathematician. Being a fictitious character he could perform tasks that were logically impossible; for example, he could "clap one hand in the air" when summoning a waiter or a minion.

Dr. Matrix was the satirical creation of Scientific American columnist Martin Gardner (1914–2010) who introduced him in his "Mathematical Games" column in January 1960. The mythical doctor appeared frequently thereafter and the relevant columns were eventually collected into a book, which went through three editions and corresponding name changes (see Bibliography below). The intent was partly to provide colorful context to mathematical puzzles and curiosities, partly to spoof various pseudo-scientific theories, and to provide a humorous introduction to the serious topic at hand.

== Fictitious biography ==
Matrix was born in Japan, the eldest of seven children of the Reverend William Miller Bush, a Seventh-day Adventist missionary. He resided in Japan until the end of World War II, where he learned the secrets of the conjuring art and worked as assistant to the famous Japanese magician Tenkai.

Presumably it was in Japan that he met Ms. Eisei Toshiyori, and where their daughter Iva Matrix was born on December 31, 1939. Iva accompanied Dr. Matrix through most of his public life, acting as assistant and manager in most of his enterprises. The author of the fictitious narrative pretended to be romantically interested in Iva, thus explaining his continuing interest in Dr. Matrix's activities.

He was a close friend and a student of Nicolas Bourbaki.

Martin Gardner tells of meeting the shady Dr. Matrix at Pyramid Lake, Nevada. He was accompanied by a Filipino assistant named Rhee, who was missing most of his teeth. They called him "One-Tooth Rhee." Both were chased out of town for running a pyramid scheme.

Dr. Matrix was often persecuted by establishment authorities, and many times had to change abode and live under assumed names, with appropriate matching changed appearances. He was accused several times of fraud. He reportedly died in 1980, in a duel against a certain Ivan Skavinsky Skavar, a KGB agent, in circumstances as obscure and dubious as most of his career.

However, in 1987 Gardner encountered Matrix, alive and well, in Casablanca at "Rick's Café Américain" of all places. It was explained that Ivan's bullet merely grazed him, but in order to avoid retaliation by the KGB, witnesses were bribed to state that he died, and a fake funeral was arranged.

== Dr. Matrix columns ==
Martin Gardner chronicled the story of Dr. Matrix in the following Mathematical Games columns.

date	Title
1960 Jan	A fanciful dialogue about the wonders of numerology
1961 Jan	In which the author chats again with Dr. Matrix, numerologist extraordinary
1963 Jan	The author pays his annual visit to Dr. Matrix, the numerologist
1964 Jan	Presenting the one and only Dr. Matrix, numerologist, in his annual performance
1965 Jan	Some comments by Dr. Matrix on symmetries and reversals
1966 Jan	Dr. Matrix returns, now in the guise of a neo-Freudian psychonumeranalyst
1967 Jan	Dr. Matrix delivers a talk on acrostics
1968 Jan	The beauties of the square, as expounded by Dr. Matrix to rehabilitate the hippie
1969 Oct	A numeranalysis by Dr. Matrix of the lunar flight of Apollo 11
1971 Jan	Lessons from Dr. Matrix in chess and numerology
1972 Feb	Dr. Matrix poses some heteroliteral puzzles while peddling perpetual motion in Houston
1973 Aug	An astounding self-test of clairvoyance by Dr. Matrix
1974 Jun	Dr. Matrix brings his numerological Science to bear on the occult powers of the pyramid
1975 Sep	Dr. Matrix finds numerological wonders in the King James Bible
1976 Nov	In which DM (Dr. Matrix) is revealed as the guru of PM (Pentagonal Meditation)
1977 Dec	Dr. Matrix goes to California to apply punk to rock study
1978 Dec	Is it a superintelligent robot or does Dr. Matrix ride again?
1980 Sep	Dr. Matrix, like Mr. Holmes, comes to an untimely and mysterious end

== Legacy ==
A web site, Ask Dr. Matrix exists which finds a numerological link between two user chosen numbers. Irish mathematical enthusiast and author Owen O’Shea has been dubbed by the New York Times as "the heir apparent to Dr. I. J. Matrix in numerological acumen”.

== Bibliography ==
Gardner's Dr. Matrix book went through three editions. The complete list is:

- The Numerology of Dr. Matrix: The Fabulous Feats and Adventures in Number Theory, Sleight of Word, and Numerological Analysis (Literary, Biblical, Political, Philosophical and Psychonumeranalytical) of That Incredible Master Mind (1967), Simon & Schuster.
- Reprinted/expanded as The Incredible Dr. Matrix: The World's Greatest Numerologist'' (1976), Charles Scribner's Sons; ISBN 0-684-14669-X.
- Reprinted/expanded as The Magic Numbers of Dr. Matrix (1985), Prometheus Books; Library of Congress Catalog Card No. 84-43183, ISBN 0-87975-281-5 (cloth), 0-87975-282-3 (paper).

All of the Dr. Matrix columns from 1960 to 1980 are collected in the third, and final, edition. One final story about Dr. Matrix appears (as the chapter "The Return of Dr. Matrix") in Gardner's book:

- Penrose Tiles to Trapdoor Ciphers (1997) Cambridge University Press. ISBN 978-0-88385-521-8.. (First published by W. H. Freeman, New York (1989), ISBN 978-0-7167-1986-1).
