= Visitors from Oz =

1998 novel by Martin Gardner

- Author: Martin Gardner
- Illustrator: Ted Enik
- Language: English
- Genre: Children's novel
- Publisher: St. Martin's Press
- Publication date: 1998
- Publication place: United States
- Pages: 189
- ISBN: 978-0-312-19353-9

Visitors from Oz: The Wild Adventures of Dorothy, the Scarecrow, and the Tin Woodman is an unofficial sequel to the Oz book series. Published in 1998, it was written by Martin Gardner and illustrated by Ted Enik. It follows up after the last Oz book written by L. Frank Baum.

Gardner employs a mathematics puzzle (involving a Klein bottle) to bring the three Oz characters to Earth in 1998, where Dorothy becomes involved in the machinations of two movie producers. Contemporary references to Rudy Giuliani, the Internet, and television newscasts are unusual, at the least, in an Oz book. Gardner's whimsy encompasses the ancient Greek gods, characters from Lewis Carroll's 1865 novel Alice's Adventures in Wonderland and its 1871 sequel Through the Looking-Glass, and an ursine detective called Sheerluck Brown.

Gardner's attempt at contemporizing Oz might be compared to Dave Hardenbrook's similar attempt in his The Unknown Witches of Oz (2000).
