= Mark Burstein (editor) =

American author, book editor and expert on Lewis Carroll

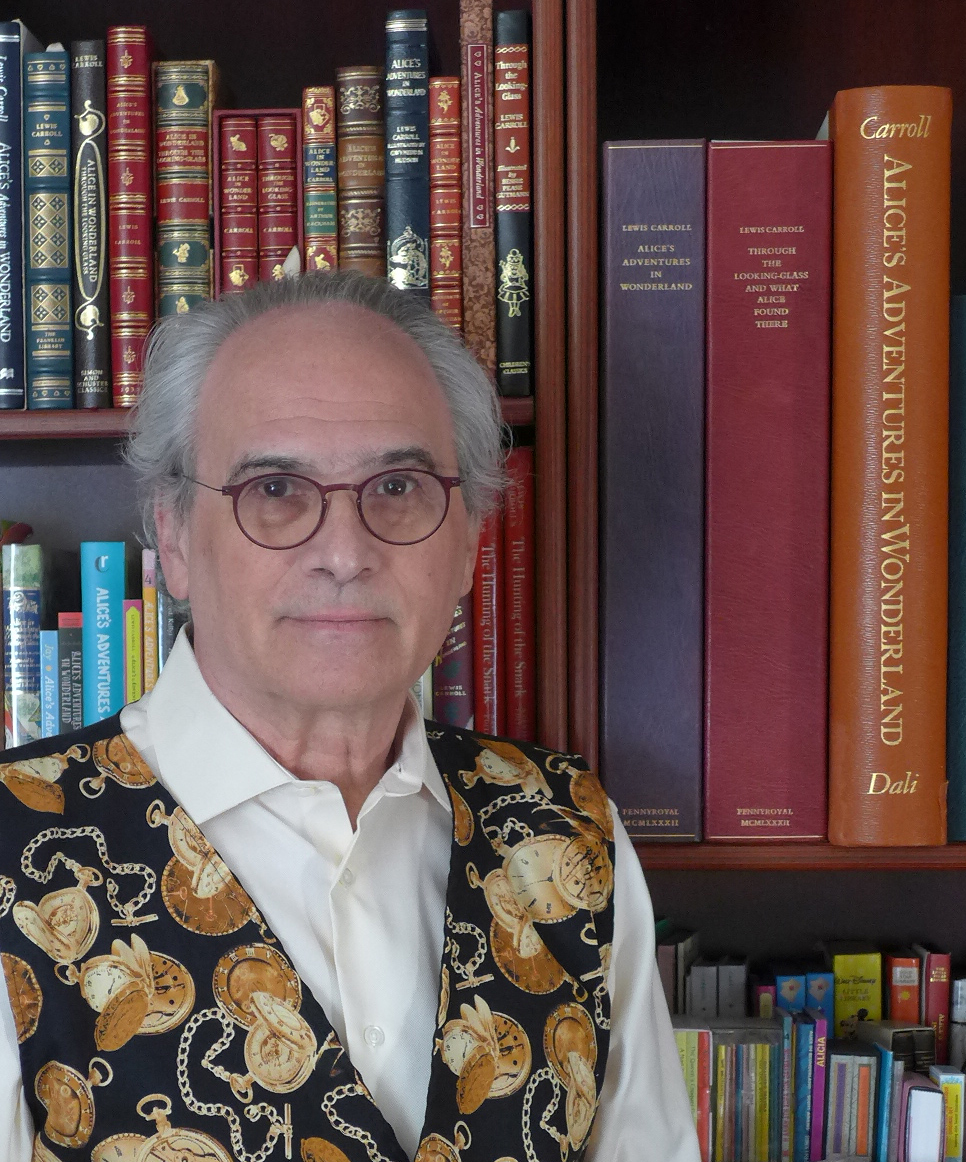
Mark Burstein

Mark Burstein (born 1950) is an author, book editor and expert on the works of Lewis Carroll. He is a lifelong Carrollian and has been a key figure in the Lewis Carroll Society of North America (LCSNA).

== Lewis Carroll expert ==
Burstein's father, Sandor G. Burstein, inspired him with a love for the works of Lewis Carroll at an early age. He has served the Lewis Carroll Society of North America (LCSNA) as its president, publications chair, and longtime editor of its magazine, Knight Letter. In 1979 he and Sandor founded The West Coast Chapter of LCSNA, Mark serving as its first and only president.

Burstein has written, edited, or made contributions to over twenty books by or about Lewis Carroll. He was the editor and art director of the deluxe 150th Anniversary Edition of Martin Gardner's The Annotated Alice (W. W. Norton, 2015), and of the first trade edition of Alice’s Adventures in Wonderland illustrated by Salvador Dalí (Princeton, 2015). He is the series editor of The Complete Pamphlets of Lewis Carroll Volumes V and VI (LCSNA/University of Virginia Press, 2015, 2020). His books have been translated into Chinese, Japanese, French, Korean, and Spanish.

Burstein continues to build the collection of Carrollian memorabilia begun by his father, Sandor. He owns over two thousand editions of Alice's Adventures in Wonderland and Through the Looking-Glass in 140 languages, and around two thousand additional books by or about Lewis Carroll.

== Martin Gardner ==
Burstein is a longtime admirer of fellow Carrollian and Scientific American columnist Martin Gardner. In 2011 he created and edited A Bouquet for the Gardener: Martin Gardner Remembered (LCSNA, 2011), with contributions from other Gardner aficionados including Raymond Smullyan, Douglas Hofstadter and David Singmaster. In 2015 he edited the aforementioned anniversary edition of Gardner's Annotated Alice.

In April 2022 he gave two talks at the 14th Gathering 4 Gardner; first a featured presentation titled What IS It about Alice? and then a talk about the many occurrences of Lewis Carroll in Gardner's "Mathematical Games" column titled A Literary Englishman and the Scientific American: Lewis Carroll’s Appearances in ‘Mathematical Games'.

== Comics and Comix ==
Burstein is a connoisseur and collector in the field of the American comic strip, particularly Pogo, and the Underground Comix of the 1960s and 70s. His books include Much Ado: The POGOfenokee Trivia Book (Eclipse Books, 1988), Alice in Comicland, Dave Sheridan: Life with Dealer McDope, The Leather Nun, The Fabulous Furry Freak Brothers (Fantagraphics Underground, 2018), and the Eisner-nominated Flamed Out: The Underground Adventures and Comix Genius of Willy Murphy (Fantagraphics, 2023).

== Personal ==
Burstein got a BA at the University of California, Santa Cruz in 1972. A longtime supernumerary with the San Francisco Opera, he lives in Petaluma, California, surrounded by a huge collection of Carrollian memorabilia. He is married to Llisa Demetrios, granddaughter of Charles Eames and Virginia Lee Burton. They have two children.

== Selected publications ==
- Pictures and Conversations: Lewis Carroll in the Comics, An Annotated International Bibliography, Edited by Mark Burstein, Byron Sewell, and Alan Tannenbaum, Ivory Door, 2003, OCLC 76972185
- The Annotated Alice 150th Anniversary Deluxe Edition, by Lewis Carroll (Author), John Tenniel (Illustrator), Martin Gardner (Editor), Mark Burstein (Editor), W. W. Norton in (2015), ISBN 978-0-393-24543-1
- A Bouquet for the Gardener: Martin Gardner Remembered, Edited by Mark Burstein, LCSNA, 2011, ISBN 978-0-930326-17-3
- Соня вь Царствѣ Дива (Sonja in a Kingdom of Wonder), Edited by Mark Burstein, LCSNA, 2013, ISBN 978-0-930326-00-5
- Alice In Comicland, Edited by Craig Yoe and Mark Burstein, IDW Publishing, 2014, ISBN 978-1-613779-13-2
- Alice’s Adventures in Wonderland: 150th Anniversary Edition Illustrated by Salvador Dalí, Princeton University Press, 2015, ISBN 978-0691170022.
