= Dana S. Richards =

American scientific writer

- Education: University of Virginia; University of Illinois at Urbana–Champaign
- Scientific career
- Fields: Computer science
- Workplaces: George Mason University; University of Virginia

Dana S. Richards is a writer, mathematics popularizer and Associate Professor in Computer Science at George Mason University.

His research interests include comparisons of protein sequences, Steiner tree algorithms, information dissemination in networks, parallel heuristics, methodology for computationally intractable problems and parallel algorithms for median filters. He is the longtime bibliographer of polymath Martin Gardner.

== Education and career ==
Richards received an M.S. from the University of Virginia in 1976 and a Ph.D. in computer science from the University of Illinois at Urbana-Champaign under Chung Laung Liu in 1984.

He was an Assistant Professor of Computer Science at the University of Virginia, and a Program Director of Theory of Computing at the National Science Foundation (June 1993 through May 1994).

He has written or edited seven books and numerous journal articles. In addition, he is a reviewer for many journals, and has received numerous research awards. He became an Associate Professor of Computer Science at George Mason University in 1994.

== Martin Gardner ==
Dana Richards was a friend of Martin Gardner going back to the 1970s, and in his writing and speaking he often memorialized and popularized Gardner's work. In 2006 he edited The Colossal Book of Short Puzzles and Problems which collected all of Gardner's short puzzles in one volume. He wrote Gardner's obituary in Science and in 2023 he published a comprehensive bibliography of Gardner's works.

Since Gardner's death in 2010 events called Celebration of Mind are held every October which include games, magic and puzzles in the Gardner tradition, and Richards is frequently featured at these events discussing Gardner's life and work.

== Books ==
- The Bibliography of Martin Gardner, June, 2023
- Dear Martin / Dear Marcello: Gardner and Truzzi on Skepticism by Dana Richards, April 28, 2017
- Problems in sorting and graph algorithms OCLC 12048476
- The colossal book of short puzzles and problems ISBN 0393061140
- The Mathemagician and Pied Puzzler ISBN 156881075X
- Dana Richards, "Martin Gardner: A 'Documentary' ", in The Mathematician and the Pied Puzzler: A collection in tribute to Martin Gardner (1999), ed.
