= Boris Kordemsky =

Russian mathematician and educator

Boris A. Kordemsky (Russian: Борис Анастасьевич Кордемский; 23 May 1907 – 29 March 1999) was a Russian mathematician and educator. He is best known for his popular science books and mathematical puzzles. He is the author of over 70 books and popular mathematics articles.

Kordemsky was born in Kiknur, Vyatka Governorate, Russian Empire. He received his Ph.D. in education in 1956 and taught mathematics at several Moscow colleges.
