= Edward Guiliano =

American author

Edward Guiliano is an American author, professor and the third president of New York Institute of Technology (NYIT).

== Early life and education ==
Guiliano grew up in Dix Hills, N.Y. He holds a bachelor's degree from Brown University, as well as a master's degree and a doctorate from Stony Brook University.

== Academic work and career ==
Guilliano joined the faculty of NYIT in 1974 as a professor in the English Department, and also taught English at SUNY-Stony Brook. He was the youngest professor in the school’s history to be promoted to Full Professor. He then entered university administration, and before becoming President, served as both vice president of academic affairs and as provost. The author and editor of several books on Lewis Carroll and Charles Dickens, he is a founding member and former president of the Lewis Carroll Society of North America. He has also been a co-editor of Dickens Studies Annual: Essays on Victorian Fiction since 1977. In addition, Guiliano served on the Board of Trustees Executive Committee for Commission on Independent Colleges & Universities in New York, the Board of Directors of the Fair Media Council, and the Long Island Regional Advisory Council on Higher Education.

=== NYIT presidency ===
On June 2, 2000, Guiliano replaced Matthew Schure as the president of NYIT. He focused on increasing awareness of the university's brand and improving its global reputation, overhauling its Manhattan campus near Columbus Circle, expanding online and other technology-based programs, and creating NYIT programs abroad. In his inaugural convocation address, Guiliano discussed higher education's "coming of age" in the 21st century, which involves using technology to empower students and faculty worldwide. During his tenure Guiliano added satellite campuses in Jonesboro, Arkansas; Vancouver, Canada; Abu Dhabi, United Arab Emirates; and China.

In 2012, he was one of the 36 highest-paid presidents of private colleges and universities in the U.S., earning $1.18 million. He was also ranked the 21st best college president in the United States. Under his presidency, NYIT introduced its 2030 Strategic Plan to outline the university's long-term goals. NYIT also achieved several high rankings for its academic programs and campus life. In 2016, Guiliano announced plans to step down as president of NYIT. Following a seven-month national search for his successor, Hank Foley was named president. He now serves as President Emeritus.

=== Books ===
Guilliano is the author of many books, focusing largely on the works of Charles Dickens. His most recent book was Dickens & Women Reobserved, published in 2020. His first book, Lewis Carroll Observed, was published in 1976.

=== Other contributions ===
Guilliano is the co-founder of the Guiliano Global Fellowship Program with his wife Mireille. He has sat on boards including those of The Browning Institute and has contributed to newspapers including The Washington Post.

== Travel writing ==
Guilliano received the 1991 Lowell Thomas Travel Journalism award for Best Guide Book for his work The Best of New York. He has written about wine and wine appreciation extensively, including an interview about wine with Walter Cronkite that ran in Wine Enthusiast Magazine in 1996. He also wrote the book Guide to the Best Wineries of North America.

== Recognition ==
Guilano was given the Ellis Island Medal of Honor in 2001, and he has been awarded two honorary degrees. In 2012, NYIT’s main Manhattan campus building at 1855 Broadway was renamed the Edward Guiliano Global Center.

== Personal life ==
Guiliano is married to Mireille Guiliano.
