= Invisible thread =

Thread used to produce an illusion

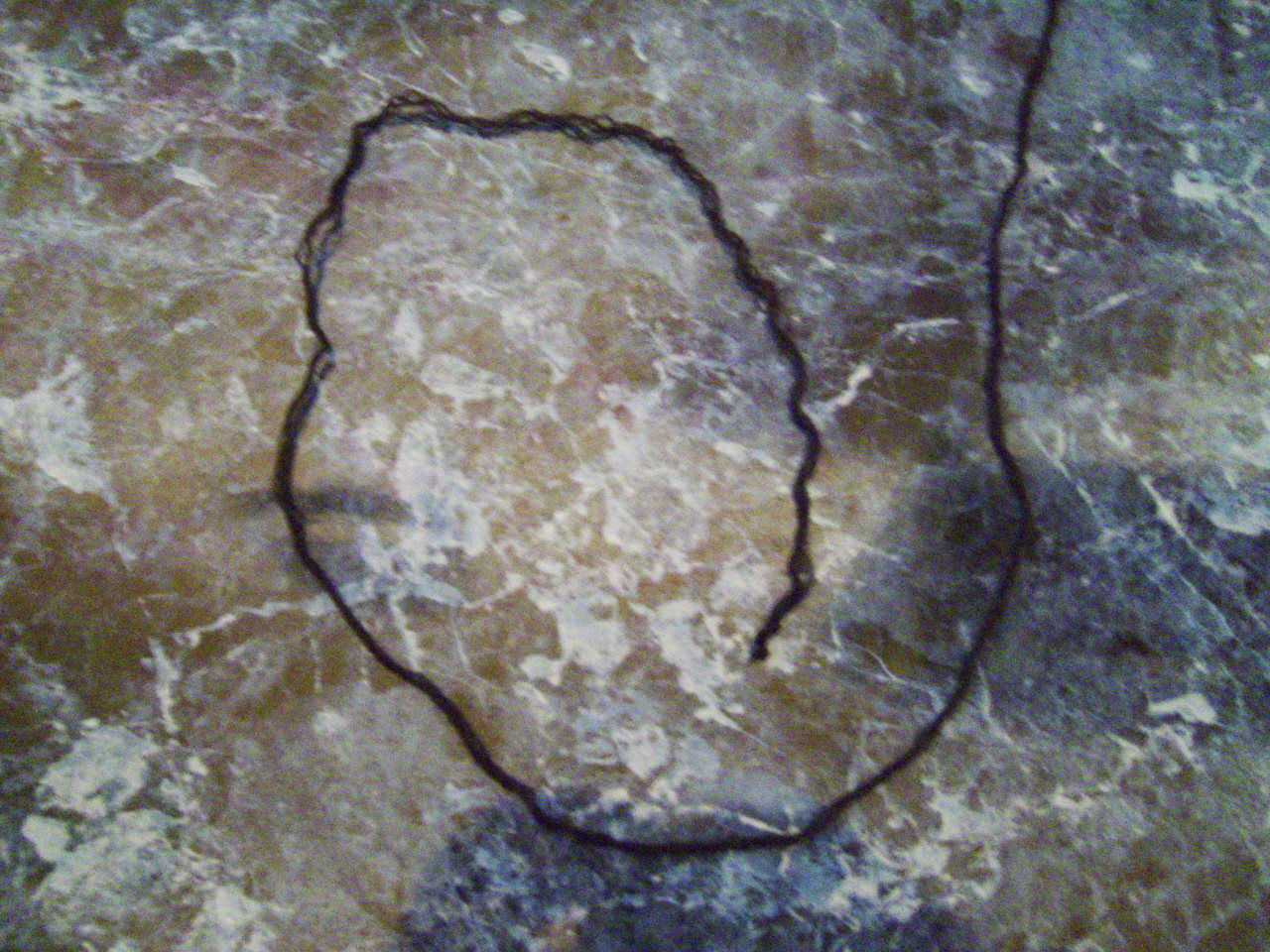
Invisible thread before separated into individual strands.

Invisible thread is very thin monofilament thread used by magicians to make small, lightweight objects seem to levitate and animate. It is usually made from nylon which has been separated into individual strands. A famous illusion is the Floating Bill.

Invisible thread is available in stripped or unstripped form. In its unstripped form the thread is actually a cluster of invisible threads and has to be separated (stripped) to be used in a performance.

Invisible thread may also be constructed from single strands of silk. Edges of silk that are fraying will reveal "invisible thread".
