= Magic, Inc. (magic goods company) =

American publisher and retailer of magic-related books

- Industry: Entertainment, Retail, Publishing
- Predecessor: Ireland Magic Company
- Founded: 1926 as Ireland Magic Company (incorporated 1963 as Magic, Inc.)
- Founder: Laurie L. Ireland
- Headquarters: Chicago, Illinois, U.S.
- Key people: James Ward Marshall; Frances Ireland Marshall Laurie L. Ireland
- Products: magic sets, books, collectibles
- Services: magic lessons
- Owner: Alexander "Sandy" Marshall
- Website: Magic, Inc.

Magic, Inc. is a publisher of magic books and retailer of magic products in North America. It is one of the oldest continuously family-run brick-and-mortar magic companies in North America.

== Location ==
The original store, then called the Ireland Magic Company, was located at 109 N. Dearborn Street in the Chicago Loop. In 1963, the store was renamed Magic, Inc. and moved to 5082 N. Lincoln Avenue in Chicago, Illinois. In 2016, the store relocated to a new space at 1838 W. Lawrence Avenue, in Chicago.

The store has been frequented by several magicians and illusionists, including Penn & Teller, Harry Blackstone Sr., Harry Blackstone Jr., and Lance Burton.

== History ==
In 1926, Laurie L. Ireland founded the Ireland Magic Company. Following Ireland's death in 1954, James "Jay" Ward Marshall married his widow, Frances Ireland, and took ownership of the business.

In 1963, Jay Marshall and Frances Ireland Marshall relocated and incorporated the business as Magic, Inc.

Frances Ireland Marshall died at the age of 92 on May 26, 2002, and Jay Marshall died in 2005. His son, Alexander "Sandy" Marshall, subsequently took ownership of the company.

== Publications ==
The company published several original titles in its early years and continues to sell them. Frances Marshall was an early originator of publishing books focused on a single magic-related topic.

The company published Match-ic (1935) and 12 Tricks with a Borrowed Deck (1940), both written by American mathematics and science writer Martin Gardner.

== Products & Services ==
The company sells a variety of magic products including books and pamphlets, magic sets and accessories, and collectibles. The company also has a staff of professional magicians who provide magic lessons for beginners and experienced magicians alike.
