= Martin Gardner =

American mathematics and science writer (1914–2010)

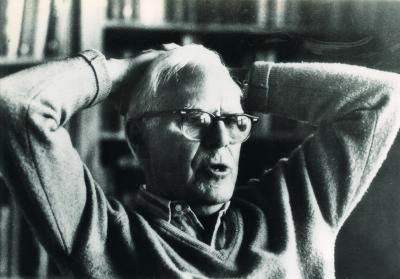
- Born: October 21, 1914; Tulsa, Oklahoma, U.S.
- Died: May 22, 2010 (aged 95); Norman, Oklahoma, U.S.
- Education: University of Chicago
- Occupation: Author
- Spouse: Charlotte Greenwald (m. 1952; died 2000)
- Children: 2
- Writing career
- Genres: Recreational mathematics, puzzles, close-up magic, annotated literary works, debunking
- Notable works: Fads and Fallacies in the Name of Science, "Mathematical Games" (Scientific American column), The Annotated Alice, The Whys of a Philosophical Scrivener, The Ambidextrous Universe
- Notable awards: Leroy P. Steele Prize for Mathematical Exposition (1987); George Pólya Award (1999); Allendoerfer Award (1990); Trevor Evans Award (1998)
- Literary movement: Scientific skepticism

Signature
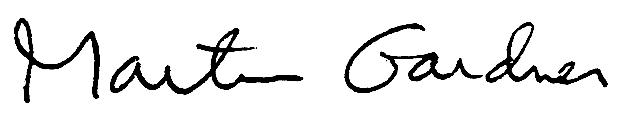

Martin Gardner (October 21, 1914 – May 22, 2010) was an American writer on popular mathematics and popular science. His interests also encompassed magic, scientific skepticism, micromagic, philosophy, religion, and literature – especially the writings of Lewis Carroll, L. Frank Baum, and G. K. Chesterton. He was a leading authority on Lewis Carroll; The Annotated Alice, which incorporated the text of Carroll's two Alice books, was his most successful work and sold over a million copies. He had a lifelong interest in magic and illusion and in 1999, MAGIC magazine named him as one of the "100 Most Influential Magicians of the Twentieth Century". He was considered the doyen of American puzzlers. He was a prolific and versatile author, publishing more than 100 books.

Gardner was best known for creating and sustaining interest in recreational mathematics—and by extension, mathematics in general—throughout the latter half of the 20th century, principally through his "Mathematical Games" columns. These appeared for twenty-five years in Scientific American, and his subsequent books collecting them.

Gardner was one of the foremost anti-pseudoscience polemicists of the 20th century. His 1957 book Fads and Fallacies in the Name of Science is a seminal work of the skeptical movement. In 1976, he joined with fellow skeptics to found CSICOP, an organization promoting scientific inquiry and the use of reason in examining extraordinary claims.

== Biography ==
=== Youth and education ===
Martin Gardner was born into a prosperous family in Tulsa, Oklahoma, to James Henry Gardner, a petroleum geologist, and his wife, Willie Wilkerson Spiers, a Montessori-trained teacher. His mother taught Martin to read before he started school, reading him The Wizard of Oz, which began a lifelong interest in the Oz books of L. Frank Baum. His fascination with mathematics started in his boyhood when his father gave him a copy of Sam Loyd's Cyclopedia of 5000 Puzzles, Tricks and Conundrums.

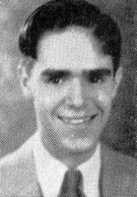
Gardner as a high school senior, 1932

He attended the University of Chicago where he studied history, literature and sciences under their intellectually-stimulating Great Books curriculum and earned his bachelor's degree in philosophy in 1936. Early jobs included reporter on the Tulsa Tribune, writer at the University of Chicago Office of Press Relations, and case worker in Chicago's Black Belt for the city's Relief Administration. During World War II, he served for four years in the U.S. Navy as a yeoman on board the destroyer escort USS Pope in the Atlantic. His ship was still in the Atlantic when the war came to an end with the surrender of Japan in August 1945.

After the war, Gardner returned to the University of Chicago. He attended graduate school for a year there, but he did not earn an advanced degree.

=== Early career ===
In the late 1940s, Gardner moved to New York City and became a writer and editor at Humpty Dumpty magazine, where for eight years, he wrote features and stories for it and several other children's magazines. His paper-folding puzzles at that magazine led to his first work at Scientific American. For many decades, Gardner, his wife Charlotte, and their two sons, Jim and Tom, lived in Hastings-on-Hudson, New York, where he earned his living as a freelance author, publishing books with several different publishers, and also publishing hundreds of magazine and newspaper articles.

=== Middle age ===
In 1950, he wrote an article in the Antioch Review entitled "The Hermit Scientist". It was one of Gardner's earliest articles about junk science, and in 1952 a much-expanded version became his first published book: In the Name of Science: An Entertaining Survey of the High Priests and Cultists of Science, Past and Present. The year 1960 saw the original edition of the best-selling book of his career, The Annotated Alice.

In 1957 Gardner started writing a column for Scientific American called "Mathematical Games". It ran for over a quarter century and dealt with the subject of recreational mathematics. The "Mathematical Games" column became the most popular feature of the magazine and was the first thing that many readers turned to. In September 1977 Scientific American acknowledged the prestige and popularity of Gardner's column by moving it from the back to the very front of the magazine.

=== Retirement and death ===
In 1979, Gardner left Scientific American. He and his wife Charlotte moved to Hendersonville, North Carolina. He continued to write math articles, sending them to The Mathematical Intelligencer, Math Horizons, The College Mathematics Journal, and Scientific American. He also revised some of his older books such as Origami, Eleusis, and the Soma Cube. Charlotte died in 2000 and in 2004 Gardner returned to Oklahoma, where his son, James Gardner, was a professor of education at the University of Oklahoma in Norman. He died there on May 22, 2010. An autobiography – Undiluted Hocus-Pocus: The Autobiography of Martin Gardner – was published posthumously.

== Mathematical Games column ==
I just play all the time and am fortunate enough to get paid for it.

— Martin Gardner, 1998

Solomon Golomb's Polyominoes were among the many recreational mathematics topics featured by Gardner in his column. The 35 hexominoes are depicted.

The "Mathematical Games" column began with a free-standing article on hexaflexagons which ran in the December 1956 issue of Scientific American. Flexagons became a bit of a fad and soon people all over New York City were making them. Gerry Piel, the SA publisher at the time, asked Gardner, "Is there enough similar material to this to make a regular feature?". Gardner said he thought so. The January 1957 issue contained his first column, entitled "Mathematical Games". Almost 300 more columns were to follow.

It ran from 1956 to 1981 with sporadic columns afterwards and was the first introduction of many subjects to a wider audience, notably:

- Flexagons (Dec 1956)
- The Game of Hex (Jul 1957)
- The Soma cube (Sep 1958)
- Squaring the square (Nov 1958)
- The Three Prisoners problem (Oct 1959)
- Polyominoes (Nov 1960)
- The Paradox of the unexpected hanging (Mar 1963)
- Rep-tiles (May 1963)
- The Superellipse (Sep 1965)
- Pentominoes (Oct 1965)
- The mathematical art of M. C. Escher (Apr 1966)
- Fractals and the Koch snowflake curve (Mar 1967)
- Conway's Game of Life (Oct 1970)
- Intransitive dice (Dec 1970)
- Newcomb's paradox (Jul 1973)
- Tangrams (Aug 1974)
- Penrose tilings (Jan 1977)
- Public-key cryptography (Aug 1977)
- Hofstadter's Godel, Escher, Bach (Jul 1979)
- The Monster group (Jun 1980)

Gardner had problems learning calculus and never took a mathematics course after high school. While editing Humpty Dumpty Magazine he constructed many paper folding puzzles. At a magic show in 1956 fellow magician Royal Vale Heath introduced Gardner to the intricately folded paper shapes known as flexagons and steered him to the four Princeton University professors who had invented and investigated their mathematical properties. The subsequent article Gardner wrote on hexaflexagons led directly to the column.

Gardner's son Jim once asked him what was his favorite puzzle, and Gardner answered almost immediately: "The monkey and the coconuts". It had been the subject of his April 1958 Games column and in 2001 he chose to make it the first chapter of his "best of" collection, The Colossal Book of Mathematics.

In the 1980s "Mathematical Games" began to appear only irregularly. Other authors began to share the column, and the June 1986 issue saw the final installment under that title. In 1981, on Gardner's retirement from Scientific American, the column was replaced by Douglas Hofstadter's "Metamagical Themas", a name that is an anagram of "Mathematical Games".

Virtually all of the games columns were collected in book form starting in 1959 with The Scientific American Book of Mathematical Puzzles & Diversions. Over the next four decades fourteen more books followed. Donald Knuth called them the canonical books.

== Influence ==
His depth and clarity will illuminate our world for a long time.

— Persi Diaconis

Martin Gardner had a major impact on mathematics in the second half of the 20th century. His column ran for 25 years and was read avidly by the generation of mathematicians and physicists who grew up in the years 1956 to 1981. His writing inspired, directly or indirectly, many who would go on to careers in mathematics, science, and other related endeavors.

Gardner's admirers included such diverse individuals as W. H. Auden, Arthur C. Clarke, Carl Sagan, Isaac Asimov, Richard Dawkins, Stephen Jay Gould, and the entire French literary group known as the Oulipo. Salvador Dalí once sought him out to discuss four-dimensional hypercubes. David Auerbach wrote: "A case can be made, in purely practical terms, for Martin Gardner as one of the most influential writers of the 20th century. His popularizations of science and mathematical games in Scientific American, over the 25 years he wrote for them, might have helped create more young mathematicians and computer scientists than any other single factor prior to the advent of the personal computer." Colm Mulcahy described him as "without doubt the best friend mathematics ever had."

Gardner's column introduced the public to books such as A K Dewdney's Planiverse and Douglas Hofstadter's Gödel, Escher, Bach. Gardner was instrumental in spreading the awareness and understanding of M. C. Escher's work. Gardner wrote to Escher in 1961 to ask permission to use his Horseman tessellation in an upcoming column about H.S.M. Coxeter. Escher replied, saying that he knew Gardner as author of The Annotated Alice, which had been sent to Escher by Coxeter. The correspondence led to Gardner introducing the previously unknown Escher's art to the world. His writing was credited as both broad and deep. Noam Chomsky once wrote, "Martin Gardner's contribution to contemporary intellectual culture is unique – in its range, its insight, and understanding of hard questions that matter." Gardner repeatedly alerted the public (and other mathematicians) to recent discoveries in mathematics – recreational and otherwise. In addition to introducing many first-rate puzzles and topics such as Penrose tiles and Conway's Game of Life, he was equally adept at writing columns about traditional mathematical topics such as knot theory, Fibonacci numbers, Pascal's triangle, the Möbius strip, transfinite numbers, four-dimensional space, Zeno's paradoxes, Fermat's Last Theorem, and the four-color problem.

Gardner set a new high standard for writing about mathematics. In a 2004 interview he said, "I go up to calculus, and beyond that I don't understand any of the papers that are being written. I consider that that was an advantage for the type of column I was doing because I had to understand what I was writing about, and that enabled me to write in such a way that an average reader could understand what I was saying. If you are writing popularly about math, I think it's good not to know too much math." John Horton Conway called him "the most learned man I have ever met."

== Gardner's mathematical grapevine ==
He had carried on incredibly interesting exchanges with hundreds of mathematicians, as well as with artists and polymaths such as Maurits Escher and Piet Hein.

— AMS Notices

Gardner maintained an extensive network of experts and amateurs with whom he regularly exchanged information and ideas. Doris Schattschneider would later term this circle of collaborators "Gardner's mathematical grapevine" or "MG^{2"}.

Gardner's role as a hub of this network helped facilitate several introductions that led to further fruitful collaborations. Mathematicians Conway, Berlekamp, and Guy, who met as a result of Gardner's influence, would go on to write Winning Ways for your Mathematical Plays, a foundational book in combinatorial game theory that Gardner subsequently championed. Gardner also introduced Conway to Benoit Mandelbrot because he knew of their mutual interest in Penrose tiles. Gardner's network was also responsible for introducing Doris Schattschneider and Marjorie Rice, who worked together to document the newly discovered pentagon tilings.

As he was launching his monthly column in 1956 and 1957, Gardner began corresponding with mathematicians such as Claude Shannon, John Nash, John Milnor, and David Gale.He credited his network with generating further material for his columns: "When I first started the column, I was not in touch with any mathematicians, and gradually mathematicians who were creative in the field found out about the column and began corresponding with me. So my most interesting columns were columns based on the material I got from them, so I owe them a big debt of gratitude."

Gardner prepared each of his columns in a painstaking and scholarly fashion and conducted copious correspondence to be sure that everything was fact-checked for mathematical accuracy. Communication was often by postcard or telephone and Gardner kept meticulous notes of everything, typically on index cards. Archives of some of his correspondence stored at Stanford University occupy some 63 linear feet of shelf space. This correspondence led to columns about the rep-tiles and pentominos of Solomon W. Golomb; the space filling curves of Bill Gosper; the aperiodic tiles of Roger Penrose; the Game of Life invented by John H. Conway; the superellipse and the Soma cube of Piet Hein; the trapdoor functions of Diffie, Hellman, and Merkle; the flexagons of Stone, Tuckerman, Feynman, and Tukey; the geometrical delights in a book by H. S. M. Coxeter; the game of Hex invented by Piet Hein and John Nash; Tutte's account of squaring the square; and many other topics.

The wide array of mathematicians, physicists, computer scientists, philosophers, magicians, artists, writers, and other influential thinkers who can be counted as part of Gardner's mathematical grapevine includes:

- Robert Ammann
- Mitsumasa Anno
- Elwyn R. Berlekamp
- Dmitri A. Borgmann
- Gregory Chaitin
- Fan Chung
- John Horton Conway
- H.S.M. Coxeter
- Erik Demaine
- Persi Diaconis
- M. C. Escher
- Solomon W. Golomb
- Bill Gosper
- Ronald Graham
- Richard K. Guy
- Frank Harary
- Piet Hein
- Douglas Hofstadter
- Ray Hyman
- Scott Kim
- David A. Klarner
- Donald Knuth
- Harry Lindgren
- Benoit Mandelbrot
- Robert Nozick
- Penn & Teller
- Roger Penrose
- James Randi
- Marjorie Rice
- Ron Rivest
- Tom Rodgers
- Rudy Rucker
- Lee Sallows
- Doris Schattschneider
- Jeffrey Shallit
- David Singmaster
- Jerry Slocum
- Raymond Smullyan
- Ian Stewart
- W. T. Tutte
- Stanislaw Ulam
- Samuel Yates
- Nob Yoshigahara

== Public key cryptography ==
These new ciphers are not absolutely unbreakable in the sense of the one-time pad, but in practice they are unbreakable in a much stronger sense than any cipher previously designed for widespread use. In principle these new ciphers can be broken. but only by computer programs that run for millions of years!

— Martin Gardner

In his August 1977 column, "A new kind of cipher that would take millions of years to break", Gardner described a new cryptographic system invented by Ron Rivest, Adi Shamir and Leonard Adleman. The system, based on trapdoor functions, was known as RSA (after the three researchers) and has become a component of the majority of secure data transmission schemes. Since RSA is a relatively slow algorithm it is not widely used to directly encrypt data. More often, it is used to transmit shared keys for symmetric-key cryptography.

Gardner identified the memorandum that his column was based on and invited readers to write to Rivest to request a copy of it. Over seven thousand requests came pouring in, some of them from other countries. This caused significant consternation in the US defense agencies and possible legal problems for Gardner himself. The National Security Agency (NSA) asked the RSA team to stop distributing the report and one letter to the IEEE suggested that disseminating such information might be violating the Arms Export Control Act and the International Traffic in Arms Regulations. In the end the defense establishment could provide no legal basis for suppressing the new technology, and when a detailed paper about RSA was published in Communications of the ACM, the NSA’s crypto monopoly was effectively terminated.

== Pseudoscience and skepticism ==
Martin Gardner is the single brightest beacon defending rationality and good science against the mysticism and anti-intellectualism that surround us.

— Stephen Jay Gould

Gardner was a critic of fringe science. His book Fads and Fallacies in the Name of Science (1952, revised 1957) launched the modern skeptical movement. It debunked dubious movements and theories including Fletcherism, Lamarckism, food faddism, Dowsing Rods, Charles Fort, Rudolf Steiner, Dianetics, the Bates method for improving eyesight, Einstein deniers, the Flat Earth theory, the lost continents of Atlantis and Lemuria, Immanuel Velikovsky's Worlds in Collision, the reincarnation of Bridey Murphy, Wilhelm Reich's orgone theory, the spontaneous generation of life, extra-sensory perception and psychokinesis, homeopathy, phrenology, palmistry, graphology, and numerology. This book and his subsequent efforts (Science: Good, Bad and Bogus, 1981; Order and Surprise, 1983, Gardner's Whys & Wherefores, 1989, etc.) provoked a lot of criticism from the advocates of alternative science and New Age philosophy. He kept up running dialogues (both public and private) with many of them for decades.

In a review of Science: Good, Bad and Bogus, Stephen Jay Gould called Gardner "The Quack Detector", a writer who "expunge[d] nonsense" and in so doing had "become a priceless national resource." In 1976 Gardner joined with fellow skeptics philosopher Paul Kurtz, psychologist Ray Hyman, sociologist Marcello Truzzi, and stage magician James Randi to found the Committee for the Scientific Investigation of Claims of the Paranormal (now called the Committee for Skeptical Inquiry). Intellectuals including astronomer Carl Sagan, author and biochemist Isaac Asimov, psychologist B. F. Skinner, and journalist Philip J. Klass became fellows of the program. From 1983 to 2002 he wrote a monthly column called "Notes of a Fringe Watcher" (originally "Notes of a Psi-Watcher") for Skeptical Inquirer, that organization's monthly magazine. These columns have been collected in five books starting with The New Age: Notes of a Fringe Watcher in 1988.

Gardner was a critic of self-proclaimed Israeli psychic Uri Geller and wrote two satirical booklets about him in the 1970s using the pen name "Uriah Fuller" in which he explained how such purported psychics do their seemingly impossible feats such as mentally bending spoons and reading minds.

Martin Gardner continued to criticize junk science throughout his life. His targets included not just safe subjects like astrology and UFO sightings, but more vigorously defended topics such as chiropractic, vegetarianism, creationism, Scientology, the Laffer Curve, and Christian Science. His final work, written just a month before his death in 2010, was an article excoriating the "dubious medical opinions and bogus science" of Oprah Winfrey – particularly her support for the thoroughly discredited theory that vaccinations cause autism; it went on to bemoan the "needless deaths of children" that such notions are likely to cause.

Skeptical Inquirer named him one of the Ten Outstanding Skeptics of the Twentieth Century. In 2010 he was posthumously honored with an award for his contributions in the skeptical field from the Independent Investigations Group. In 1982 the Committee for Skeptical Inquiry awarded Gardner its In Praise of Reason Award for his "heroic efforts in defense of reason and the dignity of the skeptical attitude", and in 2011 it added Gardner to its Pantheon of Skeptics.

== Magic ==
Card magic, and magic in general, owe a far greater debt to Martin Gardner than most conjurors realize.

— Stephen Minch

Martin Gardner held a lifelong fascination with magic and illusion that began when his father demonstrated a trick to him. He wrote for a magic magazine in high school and worked in a department store demonstrating magic tricks while he was at the University of Chicago. Gardner's first published writing (at the age of fifteen) was a magic trick in The Sphinx, the official magazine of the Society of American Magicians. He focused mainly on micromagic (table or close-up magic) and, from the 1930s on, published a significant number of original contributions to this secretive field. Magician Joe M. Turner said, The Encyclopedia of Impromptu Magic, which Gardner wrote in 1985, "is guaranteed to show up in any poll of magicians' favorite magic books." His first magic book for the general public, Mathematics, Magic and Mystery (Dover, 1956), is still considered a classic in the field. He was well known for his innovative tapping and spelling effects, with and without playing cards, and was most proud of the effect he called the "Wink Change".

Many of Gardner's lifelong friends were magicians. These included William Simon who introduced Gardner to Charlotte Greenwald, whom he married in 1952, Dai Vernon, Jerry Andrus, statistician Persi Diaconis, and polymath Raymond Smullyan. Gardner considered fellow magician James Randi his closest friend. Diaconis and Smullyan like Gardner straddled the two worlds of mathematics and magic. Mathematics and magic were frequently intertwined in Gardner's work. One of his earliest books, Mathematics, Magic and Mystery (1956), was about mathematically based magic tricks. Mathematical magic tricks were often featured in his "Mathematical Games" column–for example, his August 1962 column was titled "A variety of diverting tricks collected at a fictitious convention of magicians." From 1998 to 2002 he wrote a monthly column on magic tricks called "Trick of the Month" in The Physics Teacher, a journal published by the American Association of Physics Teachers.

In 1999 Magic magazine named Gardner one of the "100 Most Influential Magicians of the Twentieth Century". In 2005 he received a 'Lifetime Achievement Fellowship' from the Academy of Magical Arts. The last work to be published during his lifetime was a magic trick in the May 2010 issue of Word Ways: The Journal of Recreational Linguistics.

== Theism and religion ==
I am a philosophical theist. I believe in a personal God, and I believe in an afterlife, and I believe in prayer, but I don't believe in any established religion. This is called philosophical theism. ... Philosophical theism is entirely emotional. As Kant said, he destroyed pure reason to make room for faith.

— Martin Gardner, 2008

Gardner was raised as a Methodist—his mother was very religious—but rejected established religion as an adult. He considered himself a philosophical theist and a fideist. He believed in a personal God, in an afterlife, and prayer, but rejected established religion. Nevertheless, he had an abiding fascination with religious belief. In his autobiography, he stated: "When many of my fans discovered that I believed in God and even hoped for an afterlife, they were shocked and dismayed ... I do not mean the God of the Bible, especially the God of the Old Testament, or any other book that claims to be divinely inspired. For me God is a "Wholly Other" transcendent intelligence, impossible for us to understand. He or she is somehow responsible for our universe and capable of providing, how I have no inkling, an afterlife."

Gardner described his own belief as philosophical theism inspired by the works of philosopher Miguel de Unamuno. While eschewing systematic religious doctrine, he retained a belief in God, asserting that reason or science cannot confirm or disconfirm this belief. At the same time, he was skeptical of claims that any god has communicated with human beings through spoken or telepathic revelation or through miracles in the natural world. Gardner has been quoted as saying that he regarded parapsychology and other research into the paranormal as tantamount to "tempting God" and seeking "signs and wonders". He stated that while he would expect tests on the efficacy of prayers to be negative, he would not rule out a priori the possibility that unknown paranormal forces may allow prayers to influence the physical world.

Gardner wrote repeatedly about what public figures such as Robert Maynard Hutchins, Mortimer Adler, and William F. Buckley, Jr. believed and whether their beliefs were logically consistent. He sometimes attacked prominent religious figures such as Mary Baker Eddy because their claims were unsupportable. His semi-autobiographical novel The Flight of Peter Fromm depicts a traditionally Protestant Christian struggling with his faith, examining 20th-century scholarship and intellectual movements and ultimately rejecting Christianity while remaining a theist.

Gardner said that he suspected that the fundamental nature of human consciousness may not be knowable or discoverable unless perhaps a physics more profound than ("underlying") quantum mechanics is someday developed. In this regard, he said, he belonged to "a group of thinkers known as the 'mysterians'." His philosophical views, in general, are described and defended in his book The Whys of a Philosophical Scrivener (1983, revised 1999).

== Annotated works ==
Gardner was considered a leading authority on Lewis Carroll. His annotated version of Alice's Adventures in Wonderland and Through the Looking Glass, explaining the many mathematical riddles, wordplay, and literary references found in the Alice books, was first published as The Annotated Alice (Clarkson Potter, 1960). Sequels were published with new annotations as More Annotated Alice (Random House, 1990), and finally as The Annotated Alice: The Definitive Edition (Norton, 1999), combining notes from the earlier editions and new material. The original book arose when Gardner found the Alice books "sort of frightening" when he was young, but found them fascinating as an adult. He felt that someone ought to annotate them, and suggested to a publisher that Bertrand Russell be asked; when the publisher was unable to get past Russell's secretary, Gardner was asked to take on the project himself.

There had long been annotated books written by scholars for other scholars, but Gardner was the first to write such a work for the general public, and soon many other writers followed his lead. Gardner himself went on to produce annotated editions of G. K. Chesterton's The Innocence of Father Brown and The Man Who Was Thursday, as well as of celebrated poems including The Rime of the Ancient Mariner, Casey at the Bat, The Night Before Christmas, and The Hunting of the Snark.

== Novels and short stories ==
Gardner wrote two novels. He was a fan of the Oz books written by L. Frank Baum, and in 1998 he published Visitors from Oz, based on the characters in Baum's various Oz books. Gardner was a founding member of the International Wizard of Oz Club, and winner of its 1971 L. Frank Baum Memorial Award. His other novel was The Flight of Peter Fromm (1973), which reflected his lifelong fascination with religious belief and the problem of faith.

His short stories were collected in The No-Sided Professor and Other Tales of Fantasy, Humor, Mystery, and Philosophy (1987).

== Autobiography ==
At the age of 95 Gardner wrote Undiluted Hocus-Pocus: The Autobiography of Martin Gardner. He was living in a one-room apartment in Norman, Oklahoma and, as was his custom, wrote it on a typewriter and edited it using scissors and rubber cement. He took the title from a poem, a so-called grook, by his good friend Piet Hein, which perfectly expresses Gardner's abiding sense of mystery and wonder about existence.

We glibly talk
of nature's laws
but do things have
a natural cause?

Black earth turned into
yellow crocus
is undiluted
hocus-pocus.

== Wordplay ==
Gardner's interest in wordplay led him to conceive of a magazine on recreational linguistics. In 1967 he pitched the idea to Greenwood Periodicals and nominated Dmitri Borgmann as editor. The resulting journal, Word Ways, carried many of his articles—some of them posthumously—until publication ceased in 2020. He also wrote a "Puzzle Tale" column for Asimov's Science Fiction magazine from 1977 to 1986. Gardner was a member of the all-male literary banqueting club the Trap Door Spiders, which served as the basis of Isaac Asimov's fictional group of mystery solvers, the Black Widowers.

== Pen names ==
Gardner often used pen names. In 1952, while working for the children's magazine Humpty Dumpty, he contributed stories written by "Humpty Dumpty Jnr". For several years starting in 1953 he was a managing editor of Polly Pigtails, a magazine for young girls, and also wrote under that name. His Annotated Casey at the Bat (1967) included a parody of the poem, attributed to "Nitram Rendrag" (his name spelled backwards). Using the pen name "Uriah Fuller", he wrote two books attacking the alleged psychic Uri Geller. In later years, Gardner often wrote parodies of his favorite poems under the name "Armand T. Ringer", an anagram of his name. In 1983 one George Groth panned Gardner's book The Whys of a Philosophical Scrivener in the New York Review of Books. Only in the last line of the review was it revealed that George Groth was Martin Gardner himself.

In his January 1960 "Mathematical Games" column, Gardner introduced the fictitious "Dr. Matrix" and wrote about him often over the next two decades. Dr. Matrix was not exactly a pen name, although Gardner did pretend that everything in these columns came from the fertile mind of the good doctor. Then, in 1979, Dr. Matrix himself published an article in the quite respectable Two-Year College Mathematics Journal. It was called Martin Gardner: Defending the Honor of the Human Mind and contained a biography of Gardner and a history of his "Mathematical Games" column. It would be a further decade before Martin published an article in such a mathematics journal under his own name.

== Philosophy of mathematics ==
Gardner wrote on the philosophy of mathematics. He wrote negative reviews of The Mathematical Experience by Philip J. Davis and Reuben Hersh and What Is Mathematics, Really? by Hersh, both of which were critical of aspects of mathematical Platonism, and the first of which was well received by the mathematical community. While Gardner was often perceived as a hard-core Platonist, his reviews demonstrated some formalist tendencies. Gardner maintained that his views are widespread among mathematicians, but Hersh has countered that in his experience as a professional mathematician and speaker, this is not the case.

== Mathematics education ==
In the August 1998 edition, Gardner wrote his final piece for Scientific American titled, "A Quarter Century of Recreational Mathematics." In it he wrote,

For 40 years I have done my best to convince educators that recreational math should be incorporated into the standard curriculum. It should be regularly introduced as a way to interest young students in the wonders of mathematics. So far, though, movement in this direction has been glacial.

He recalls how as a young boy a math teacher had scolded him for working on a bit of recreational mathematics and laments at how wrongheaded this attitude is. He notes that the magazine Mathematics Teacher published by the National Council of Teachers of Mathematics, and specially dedicated to improving mathematics instruction for grades 8–14, often has articles on recreational topics but that most teachers do not use them.

Martin Gardner was also frustrated by the fact that the history curriculum rarely featured scientists and mathematicians. In a New York Times review of Stanislaw Ulam's autobiographical book, Adventures of a Mathematician, he said,

Biographical history, as taught in our public schools, is still largely a history of boneheads: ridiculous kings and queens, paranoid political leaders, compulsive voyagers, ignorant generals—the flotsam and jetsam of historical currents. The men who radically altered history, the great creative scientists and mathematicians, are seldom mentioned if at all.

Ulam has never ceased to be amazed by “how a few scribbles on a blackboard … could change the course of human affairs.” That this kind of symbol manipulation, in the hands of absent‐minded intellects, can shape history for both good and evil is the apocalyptic center of Ulam's story.

Behind the scenes, invisible to all but a few, are the discoverers of these curious patterns in the cosmic carpet. They scribble their hieroglyphics on the back of a menu and men go to the moon, harness the atom, crack the genetic code, transform the planet's face.

== Legacy and awards ==
The numerous awards Gardner received include:

- 1987 – Leroy P. Steele Prize for his many books and articles on mathematics
- 1971 – L. Frank Baum Memorial Award from the International Wizard of Oz Club
- 1980 – The main-belt asteroid 2587 Gardner discovered by Edward L. G. Bowell at Anderson Mesa Station is named after Martin Gardner.
- 1990 – Allendoerfer Award (along with Fan Chung & Ronald Graham) from The Mathematical Association of America (MAA)
- 1994 – JPBM Communications Award from the Joint Policy Board for Mathematics
- 1997 – became a Fellow (Class: Humanities and Arts, Section: Literature) of the American Academy of Arts and Sciences.
- 1998 – Trevor Evans Award from the MAA
- 1999 – listed in the "100 Most Influential Magicians of the Twentieth Century" by Magic magazine.
- 2011 – Houdini Hall of Honor award (posthumous) from the Independent Investigations Group

The Mathematical Association of America has established a Martin Gardner Lecture to be given each year on the last day of MAA MathFest, the summer meeting of the MAA. The first annual lecture, Recreational Mathematics and Computer Science: Martin Gardner's Influence on Research, was given by Erik Demaine of the Massachusetts Institute of Technology on Saturday, August 3, 2019, at MathFest in Cincinnati. The 2021 lecture Surprising discoveries of three amateur mathematicians: M.C. Escher, Marjorie Rice, and Rinus Roelofs was virtual and was given by Doris Schattschneider.

There are eight bricks honoring Gardner in the Paul R. Halmos Commemorative Walk, installed by The Mathematical Association of America (MAA) at their Conference Center in Washington, D.C. Gardner has an Erdős number of 1.

== Gathering 4 Gardner ==
Martin Gardner continued to write up until his death in 2010, and his community of fans grew to span several generations. Moreover, his influence was so broad that many of his fans had little or no contact with each other. This led Atlanta entrepreneur and puzzle collector Tom Rodgers to the idea of hosting a weekend gathering celebrating Gardner's contributions to recreational mathematics, rationality, magic, puzzles, literature, and philosophy. Although Gardner was famously shy, and would usually decline an honor if it required him to make a personal appearance, Rodgers persuaded him to attend the first such "Gathering 4 Gardner" (G4G), held in Atlanta in January 1993.

A second such get-together was held in 1996, again with Gardner in attendance. A video was made for the CBC Television program The Nature of Things with David Suzuki. It featured Gardner along with many members of his circle and was called "Martin Gardner: Mathemagician" and broadcast on March 14, 1996. At this point Rodgers and his friends decided to make the gathering a regular, bi-annual event. Participants over the years have ranged from long-time Gardner friends such as John Horton Conway, Elwyn Berlekamp, Ronald Graham, Donald Coxeter, and Richard K. Guy, to newcomers like mathematician and mathematical artist Erik Demaine, mathematical video maker Vi Hart, and Fields Medalist Manjul Bhargava.

The attendees at G4G include magicians, mathematicians, jugglers, philosophers, scientific skeptics, fans of Lewis Carroll, puzzle collectors, fans of Conway's game of life, Rubik's cubers, chess masters, and any other topic that Gardner was interested in or had written about.

The first gathering in 1993 was G4G1 and the 1996 event was G4G2. Since then it has been in even-numbered years. The 2018 event was G4G13. Because of the COVID-19 pandemic, the G4G14 event was not held until 2022. Two years later G4G15 took place. All G4Gs up to 2024 have been in Atlanta.

== Bibliography ==
In a publishing career spanning 80 years (1930–2010), Gardner authored or edited over 100 books and countless articles, columns and reviews. A comprehensive bibliography of his works was published in 2023 by Dana Richards, with a foreword by Donald Knuth.

He was a frequent contributor to The New York Review of Books.

All Gardner's works were non-fiction except for two novels – The Flight of Peter Fromm (1973) and Visitors from Oz (1998) – and two collections of short pieces – The Magic Numbers of Dr. Matrix (1967, 1985) and The No-Sided Professor (1987).

== Sources ==
- Albers, Don (2008). The Martin Gardner Interview (in five parts) with MAA Editorial Director Don Albers, fifteeneightyfour: the blog of Cambridge University Press
- AMS Notices (2004). Interview with Martin Gardner Notices of the AMS, Vol. 52, No. 6, June/July 2005, pp. 602–611
- AMS Notices (2011). Memories of Martin Gardner Notices of the AMS, Vol. 58, No. 3, March 2011, p. 420
- Antonick, Gary (2014). Ignited by Martin Gardner, Ian Stewart Continues to Illuminate The New York Times, October 27, 2014
- Auerbach, David (2013). A Delville of a Tolkar: Martin Gardner’s “Undiluted Hocus-Pocus” Los Angeles Review of Books, November 4, 2013
- BBC News (2014). Martin Gardner, puzzle master extraordinaire BBC News Magazine, October 21, 2014
- Bhargava, Manjul (2018). An Interview with Manjul Bhargava with Colm Mulcahy, G4G13, April 2018
- Bellos, Alex (2010). Martin Gardner obituary The Guardian, May 27, 2010
- Berlekamp, Elwyn R (2014). The Mathematical Legacy of Martin Gardner Society for Industrial and Applied Mathematics (SIAM), September 2, 2014
- Berlekamp, Elwyn R., John H. Conway, and Richard K. Guy (1982). Winning Ways for your Mathematical Plays Academic Press, ISBN 0120911507.
- Brown, Emma (2010). Martin Gardner, prolific math and science writer, dies at 95 The Washington Post, May 24, 2010
- Burstein, Mark, ed. (2011). A Bouquet for the Gardner: Martin Gardner Remembered. New York: The Lewis Carroll Society of North America. ISBN 978-0-930326-17-3.
- Case, James (2014). Martin Gardner’s Mathematical Grapevine By James Case, SIAM News, April 1, 2014
- Costello, Matthew J. (1988). The Greatest Puzzles of All Time New York: Prentice Hall Press, ISBN 0133649369
- Crease, Robert P (2018). Martin Gardner would have smiled Physics World: Education and Outreach Blog, April 16, 2018
- Demaine (2008). Edited by Erik D. Demaine, Martin L. Demaine, Tom Rodgers. A lifetime of puzzles : a collection of puzzles in honor of Martin Gardner's 90th birthday A K Peters: Wellesley, MA, ISBN 1568812450
- Dirda, Michael (2009). Book review by Michael Dirda: 'When You Were a Tadpole and I Was a Fish' by Martin Gardner The Washington Post, October 22, 2009
- The Economist (2010). Martin Gardner obituary June 3, 2010
- England, Jason (2014). The puzzling life of Martin Gardner Cosmos Magazine, February 24, 2014
- Friedel, Frederic (2018). Remembering Martin Gardner, January 16, 2018
- Gardner, Martin (1998). A Quarter Century of Recreational Mathematics by Martin Gardner, Scientific American, August 1998
- Gardner, Martin (2013). Undiluted Hocus-Pocus: The Autobiography of Martin Gardner Princeton University Press, ISBN 0691159912.
- Gardner, Martin (2016). The Recreational Mathematics of Piet Hein Piet Hein Website
- Gathering 4 Gardner (2014). Martin Gardner – Magician
- Gould, Stephen Jay (1982). The Quack Detector The New York Review of Books, February 4, 1982
- Groth, George (1983). Review of Gardner’s Game with God The New York Review of Books, December 8, 1983
- Hofstadter, Douglas (2010). Martin Gardner: A Major Shaping Force in My Life Scientific American, May 24, 2010
- Klarner, David A. (1998). Mathematical Recreations: A Collection in Honor of Martin Gardner, Dover Publications, New York, pp. 140–166
- Kindley, Evan (2015). Down the Rabbit Hole: The rise, and rise, of literary annotation By Evan Kindley, The New Republic, September 21, 2015
- Kullman, David (1997). The Penrose Tiling at Miami University Presented at the Mathematical Association of America Ohio Section Meeting Shawnee State University, October 24, 1997
- Lister, David (1995). Martin Gardner and Paperfolding British Origami Society, February 15, 1995.
- MAA FOCUS (2010). Remembering Martin Gardner vol 30 (4), August/September 2010
- MacTutor (2010). History of Mathematics archive: Martin Gardner
- Malkevitch, Joseph (2014). Magical Mathematics – A Tribute to Martin Gardner American Mathematical Society, March 2014
- Martin, Douglas (2010). Martin Gardner, Puzzler and Polymath, Dies at 95 The New York Times, May 23, 2010
- Martin Gardner – Mathematician (official website)
- Mirsky, Steve (2010). Scholars and Others Pay Tribute to "Mathematical Games" Columnist Martin Gardner Scientific American, May 24, 2010
- Mulcahy, Colm (2013). Celebrations of Mind Honor Math’s Best Friend, Martin Gardner Scientific American, October 29, 2013
- Mulcahy, Colm (2014). The Top 10 Martin Gardner Scientific American Articles Scientific American, October 21, 2014
- Mulcahy, Colm (2017). Martin Gardner – The Best Friend Mathematics Ever Had The Huffington Post, January 23, 2014
- Peterson, Ivars (2014). Honoring a Century of Martin Gardner in MAA Focus, the newsmagazine of the Mathematical Association of America, Vol. 34, No. 5, Oct/Nov 2014
- Propp, James (2015). Martin Gardner Testimonials Belmont, MA, July 29, 2015
- Princeton University Press Reviews of Undiluted Hocus-Pocus: The Autobiography of Martin Gardner
- Richards, Dana (2014). Math Games of Martin Gardner Still Spur Innovation by Dana S. Richards & Colm Mulcahy, Scientific American, October 1, 2014
- Richards, Dana (2018). Martin Gardner, Annotator G4G13, April 2018 – video
- Shermer, Michael (1997). Martin Gardner 1914–2010: Founder of the Modern Skeptical Movement Michael Shermer interviews Martin Gardner, Skeptic Magazine, Vol 5, No. 2 (1997)
- Suzuki, David (1996). Mystery and Magic of Mathematics: Martin Gardner and Friends The Nature of Things, March 14, 1996 – video
- Teller (2014). ‘Undiluted Hocus-Pocus,’ by Martin Gardner The New York Times: Sunday Book Review, January 3, 2014
