= Gathering 4 Gardner =

Educational foundation in Atlanta, Georgia, U.S.

- Abbreviation: G4G
- Founder: Thomas M. Rodgers
- Type: 501(c)(3)
- Purpose: recreational mathematics, magic and illusion, puzzles, philosophy, rationality
- Location: Atlanta, GA
- Board of directors: Nancy Blachman, President; Robert W. Vallin, Secretary; Rick Sommer, Treasurer Board members: Colm Mulcahy; Jim Gardner; Bob Hearn; Doris Schattschneider; Evans Harrell; Colin D. Wright; Smita Saxena; Tiago Hirth Ex-board members: Tom Rodgers (founder); Elwyn Berlekamp (co-founder); Mark Setteducati (co-founder); Robert P. Crease; Erik Demaine; Scott Hudson de Tarnowsky; Rob Jones; Mark Mitton; Bruce Oberg; Thane Plambeck; Jade Vinson; Scott Vorthmann; Carolyn Yackel
- Website: www.gathering4gardner.org

Gathering 4 Gardner (G4G) is an educational foundation and non-profit corporation (Gathering 4 Gardner, Inc.) devoted to preserving the legacy and spirit of prolific writer Martin Gardner. G4G organizes conferences where people who have been inspired by or have a strong personal connection to Martin Gardner can meet and celebrate his influence. These events explore ideas and developments in recreational mathematics, magic, illusion, puzzles, philosophy, and rationality, and foster creative work in all of these areas by enthusiasts of all ages. G4G also facilitates a related series of events called Celebration of Mind (CoM).

== History ==
Martin Gardner's prolific output as a columnist and writer—he authored over 100 books between 1951 and 2010—put him in contact with a large number of people on a wide range of subjects from magic, mathematics, puzzles, physics, philosophy, logic and rationality, to G. K. Chesterton, Alice in Wonderland, and the Wizard of Oz. M. C. Escher thanked Gardner for popularizing his work in the United States. As a result, he had a large following of amateurs and professionals eager to pay tribute to him, but many of them had only infrequent contact with each other. Moreover, Gardner was famously shy, and generally declined to appear at any events honoring him.

In the early 1990s, Atlanta-based entrepreneur and puzzle collector Thomas M. Rodgers (1943–2012), a friend of Martin Gardner's, conceived a plan to create a gathering of people who shared Gardner's interests, especially puzzles, magic, and mathematics. Rodgers invited the world's foremost puzzle composers and collectors, and enlisted magician Mark Setteducati and mathematician Elwyn Berlekamp to recruit leading magicians and recreational mathematicians, respectively. Gardner agreed to attend. Thus was born the first Gathering (G4G1), held in Atlanta, GA, in January 1993. For the next two decades G4G was supported mainly by Rodgers with "seemingly unfettered access to his personal time and resources". So far there have been 15 Gatherings, all held in downtown Atlanta.

In 2007 board members Rodgers, Berlekamp, Setteducati, Thane Plambeck, and Scott Hudson de Tarnowsky decided that G4G should broaden its reach and expand the scope of its educational programs. To that end they formed the 501(c)(3) non-profit corporation Gathering 4 Gardner, Inc.

The logo of Gathering for Gardner, as well as the logo for the first CoM event, employs ambigrams designed by long-time Gardner associate Scott Kim.

== G4Gn events ==
Packed with wonderful treats and startling surprises, it provided one "aha!" moment after another.

— Ivars Peterson

Continuing Martin Gardner's pursuit of a playful and fun approach to learning, G4Gn events explore ideas in fields of interest to Gardner. The term G4G is also used to denote the community of people who participate in these events. With the "n" denoting the number in the series, G4Gn is an invitation-only bi-annual conference that started with G4G1 in January 1993. A second gathering (G4G2) was held in Atlanta in 1996, and from then on the events have been held bi-annually, in the springs of even-numbered years, up until G4G13 which took place in April 2018 and featured Fields medallist Manjul Bhargava and inventor of the eponymous cube Ernő Rubik.

After a delay because of Covid, G4G14 finally took place in April 2022. Lewis Carroll expert Mark Burstein was a featured speaker with a talk titled, “A Literary Englishman and the Scientific American: Lewis Carroll’s Appearances in ‘Mathematical Games”. Ingrid Daubechies was also a featured speaker with a talk titled, "Reunited: An Art Historical and Digital Adventure".

To date, all G4Gn conferences have been held in Atlanta, GA. Gardner (and his wife), who disliked travel in addition to wanting to avoid the limelight, attended only the first two G4Gs.

Notable presenters over the years have included

- Jerry Andrus
- Art Benjamin
- John H. Conway
- Donald Coxeter
- Erik Demaine
- Persi Diaconis
- Jim Gardner (Martin Gardner's son)
- Lennart Green
- Richard K. Guy
- George W. Hart
- Vi Hart
- Jay Marshall
- Max Maven
- Alexa Meade
- Jeannine Mosely
- Roger Penrose
- Dana Richards
- Doris Schattschneider
- Will Shortz
- Raymond Smullyan

Activities typically include lectures, performance art, puzzle and book displays, close-up and stage magic acts. Another tradition held at these off-site events was the directed community building of original mathematical sculptures under the leadership of George Hart, Chaim Goodman-Strauss and others. An example of blending art, math and whimsy occurred at the G4G16 conference where they made a giant Wacław Sierpiński tetrahedron out of 512 long balloons. Each conference has a Gift Exchange, in which attendees swap puzzles, magic tricks, artwork, mathematical papers, novelty items, books, and CDs/DVDs.

Gardner and many of his admirers were filmed at G4G2 in 1996, and this footage formed the basis for a 46-minute episode of The Nature of Things made by David Suzuki. Titled, Mystery and Magic of Mathematics: Martin Gardner and Friends, it showcases Martin's numerous passions, and reminds us of the amazing panoply of people that he informally assembled and mentored over the decades.

== Celebration of Mind events ==
Developed in 2010 after Martin Gardner's death that spring, Celebration of Mind (CoM) is a worldwide series of events held on or around Gardner's birthday: October 21. Anyone, anywhere, can host one, and most of them are open to the public. These CoMs vary in size from three people meeting to perform rubber-band magic for each other, to crowds of hundreds of students in highly organized exploratory paper folding activities. The goal is to celebrate the boundless creativity and curiosity of the human mind, and they have been held in locations from Boston to Beijing, and from Riga to Rio. There have been Celebration of Mind events hosted on all seven continents, and G4G encourages organizers to register their events at the CoM website. Resources to assist with hosting events are provided through the organization's website, or participants can also just perform a magic trick, or share a puzzle or recreational mathematics problem with friends.

== Gallery ==
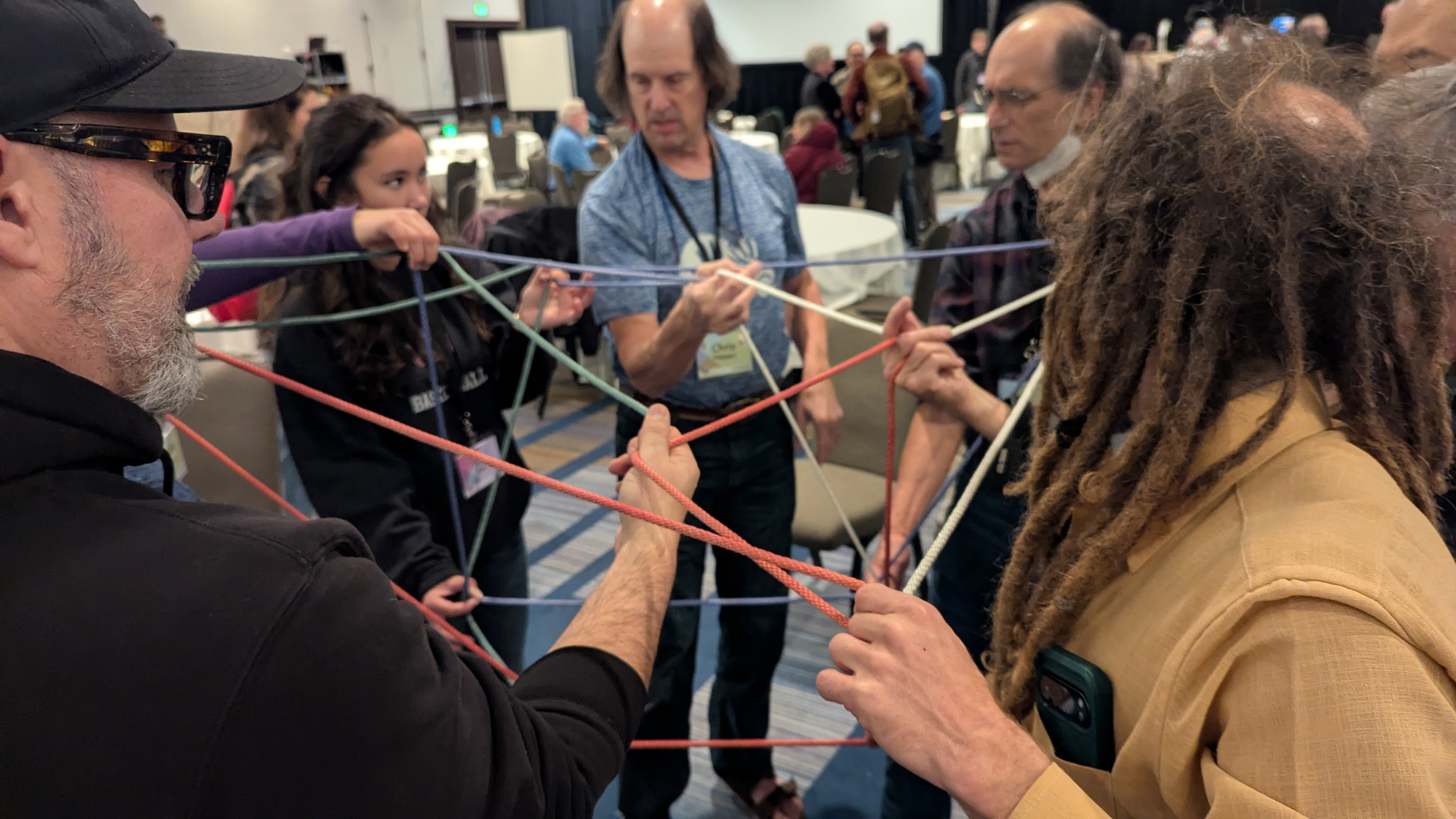
G4G participants working on creating the G4G hypercube logo from loops of string. Project conceived by Karl Schaffer and Scott Kim.

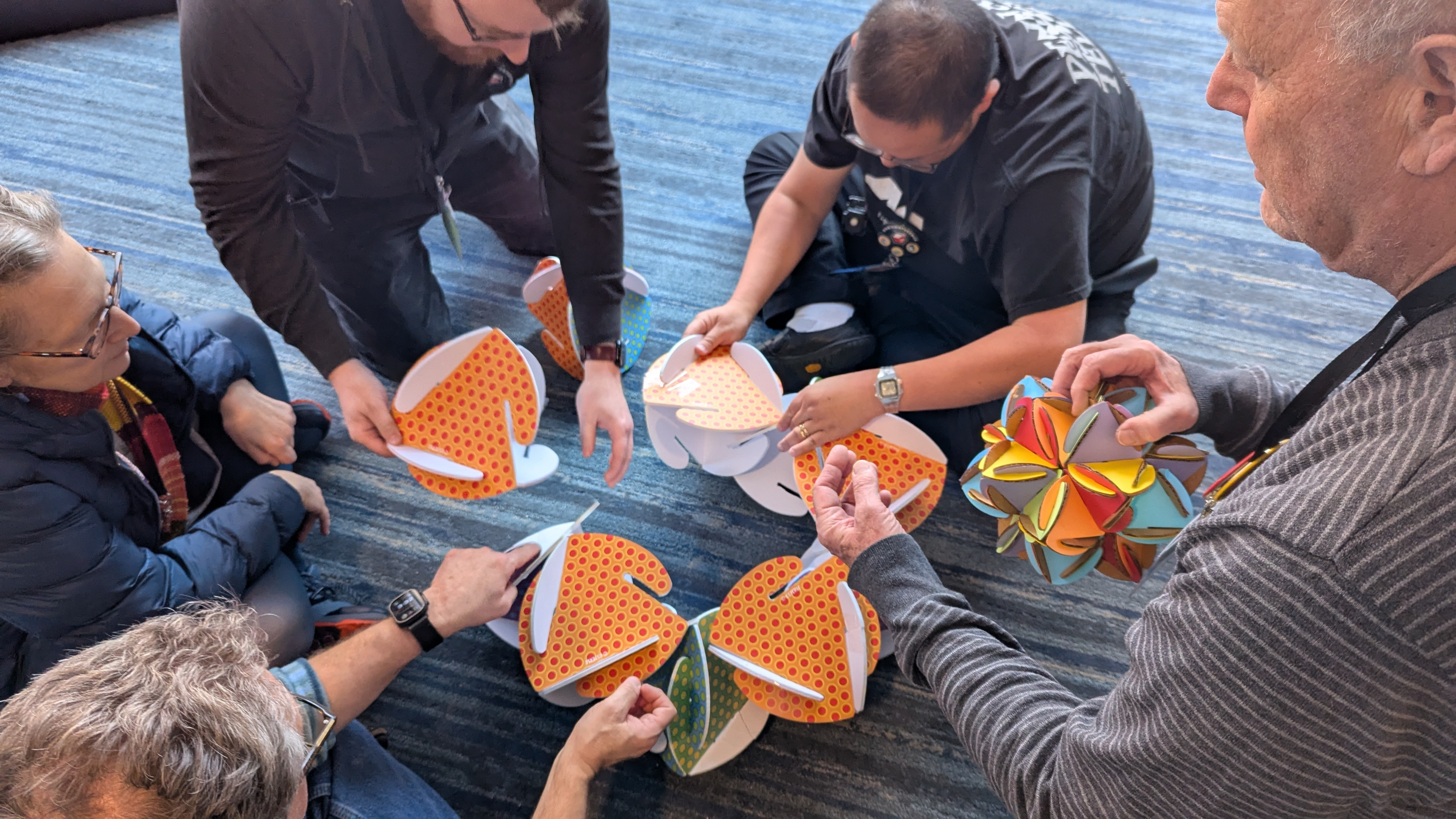
G4G participants constructing a stellated icosahedron composed of 60 triangular space chips, designed by Dick Esterele.

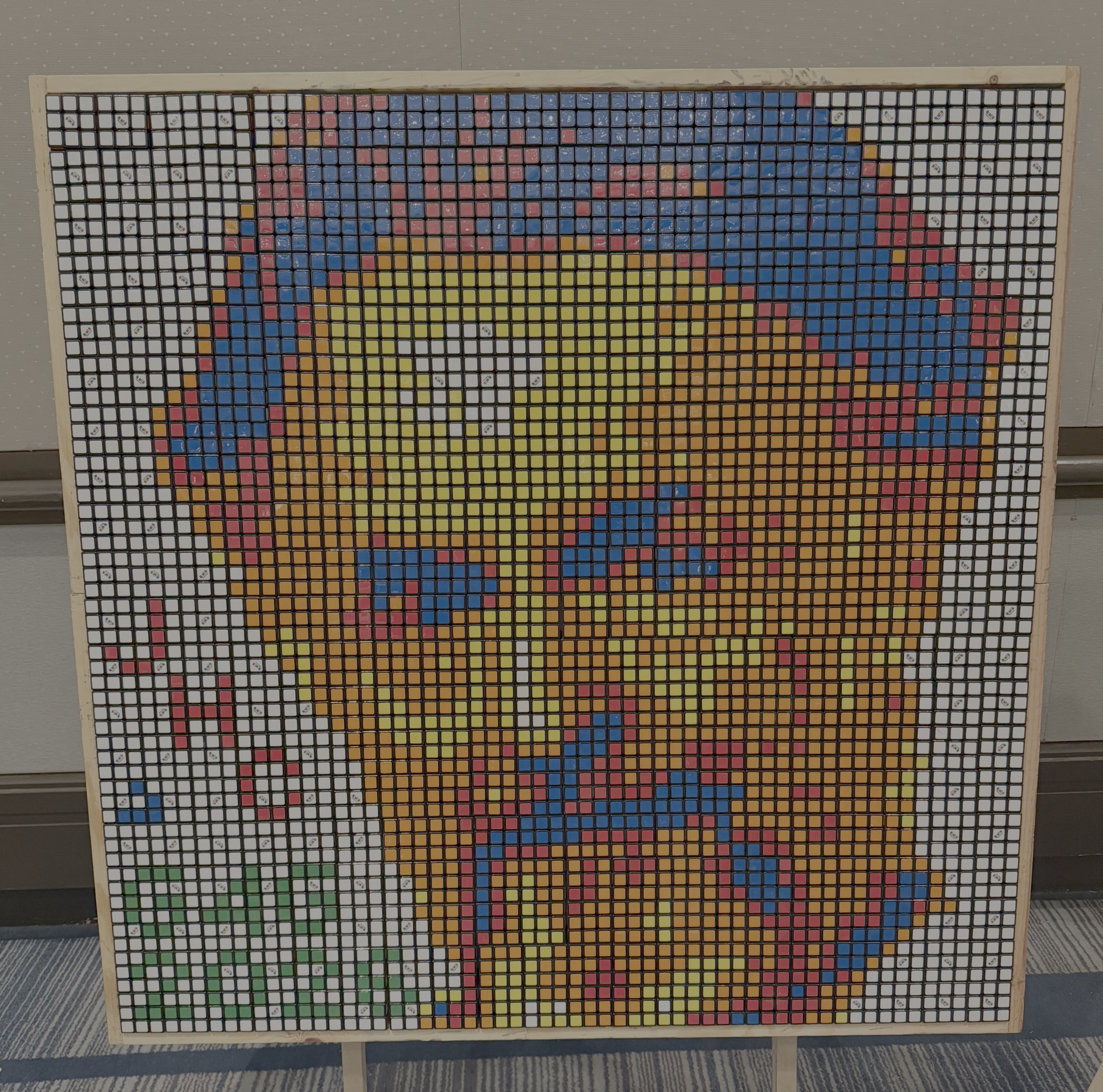
John H Conway mosaic composed of 400 Rubik's cubes "solved" by Tom Rokicki and G4G participants.

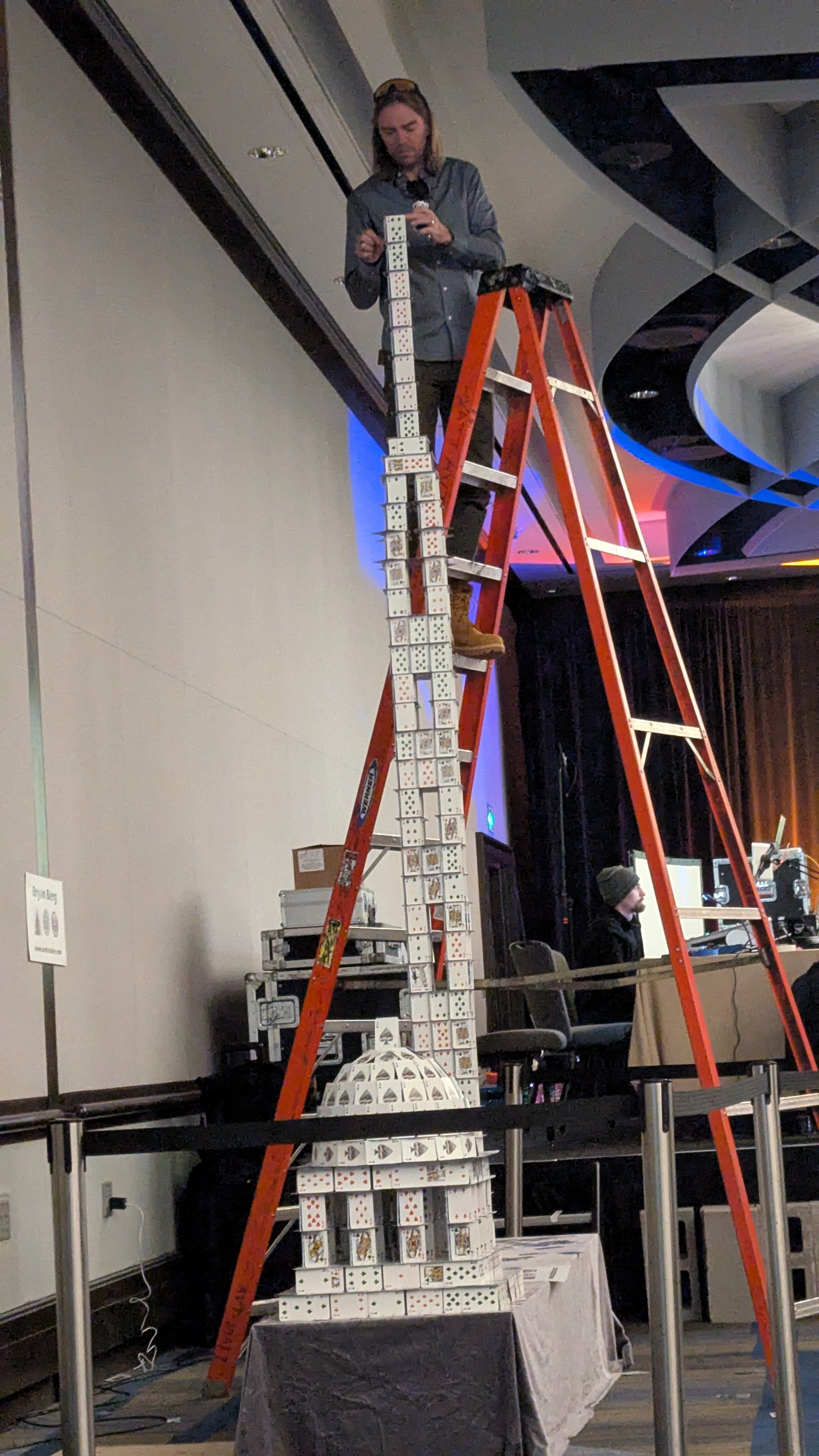
Cardstacker Bryan Berg stacks cards at Gathering 4 Gardner.
