= Evans Harrell =

Mathematics researcher

Evans Malott Harrell II (born 1950) is an American mathematician known for his research in mathematical physics and the spectral theory of linear operators, particularly related to the Schrödinger equation. From 2005 to 2014 he was Professor and Associate Dean in the School of Mathematics at the Georgia Institute of Technology.

== Early life and education ==
Harrell was born in 1950 in Indianapolis, Indiana. He earned his undergraduate degree from Stanford University and completed his Ph.D. at Princeton University in 1976, where his doctoral dissertation was titled "Schrödinger Operators with Singular Perturbation Potentials" under the advisor Barry Simon. He held visiting and postdoctoral posts at Haverford, the University of Vienna, and MIT before his first tenure-track role at Johns Hopkins. He joined Georgia Tech in 1983 and remained there until his retirement.

== Research and Academic Contributions ==
Harrell’s research focuses on the analysis of differential equations, particularly in the spectral theory of elliptic operators and semiclassical quantum mechanics. He is recognized for his work on the influence of geometry on the eigenvalues and eigenvectors of differential equations, as well as for studying the behavior of quantum systems at atomic scales.

== Education reform ==
Harrell has been an active voice in science education reform and has contributed to international mathematics education. He participated in scientific exchanges and delivered lectures in countries that included Benin, Senegal, and Mali. Additionally, he serves on the board of the educational foundation Gathering 4 Gardner (G4G).

== Science Communication through the Arts ==
Harrell integrates dance, music, circus arts, and drama into his science communication efforts. He founded Mathematics in Motion, a production company devoted to blending mathematics with the lively arts. Through this initiative, Harrell has produced and directed science-themed performances at various events, including the Atlanta Science Festival and the Julia Robinson Mathematics Festival.

== Honors ==
Harrell won a Sloan Research Fellowship in 1983. He is a Fellow of the American Association for the Advancement of Science (AAAS). Georgia Tech awarded him an Outstanding Service Award in 1996 and the Eichholtz Teaching Award in 2006.

== Papers ==
- 2016: "Two-term, asymptotically sharp estimates for eigenvalue means of the Laplacian" (with Joachim Stubbe), Cornell University
- 2009: "Universal inequalities for the eigenvalues of Laplace and Schrödinger operators on submanifolds" (with A El Soufi, E Harrell, S Ilias), Transactions of the American Mathematical Society 361 (5), 2337-2350
- 2003:"A physical short-channel threshold voltage model for undoped symmetric double-gate MOSFETs" (with Q Chen and JD Meindl), IEEE Transactions on Electron Devices 50 (7), 1631-1637
- 2001 "On the placement of an obstacle or a well so as to optimize the fundamental eigenvalue" (with P Kröger & K Kurata) SIAM Journal on Mathematical Analysis 33 (1), 240-259
- 1997: "On trace identities and universal eigenvalue estimates for some partial differential operators" (with J Stubbe), Transactions of the American Mathematical Society 349 (5), 1797-1809
- 1994: "Commutator bounds for eigenvalues, with applications to spectralgeometry (with PL Michel), Communications in Partial Differential Equations 19 (11-12), 2037-2055
- 1990: "Elimination of chaos in an intracavity-doubled Nd: YAG laser" (with GE James, C Bracikowski, K Wiesenfeld, R Roy), Optics Letters 15 (20), 1141-1143
- 1990: "Intermittency and chaos in intracavity doubled lasers. II" (with GE James & R Roy), Physical Review A 41 (5), 2778
- 1980: "Double wells" Communications in Mathematical Physics 75 (3), 239-261
- 1980: "The mathematical theory of resonances whose widths are exponentially small" (with B Simon), Vol. 47, No. 4 Duke Mathematical Journal (C) December 1980
- 1978: "On the rate of asymptotic eigenvalue degeneracy" Communications in Mathematical Physics 60 (1), 73-95

== Books ==
- 2000 Linear Methods of Applied Mathematics, Orthogonal series, boundary-value problems, and integral operators Evans M. Harrell II and James V. Herod (1994, 2000)
- 2012: A course in mathematical physics 1: classical dynamical systems by Walter Thirring, translated by Evans Harrell, Springer Verlag ISBN 978-3-7091-8526-1
