= Thomas Malin Rodgers =

American businessman and puzzle collector (1943–2012)

Thomas Malin Rodgers (August 1, 1943 — April 12, 2012) was an Atlanta-based businessman and puzzle collector who is remembered as the originator of the Gathering 4 Gardner (G4G) educational foundation, first conceived in 1992. He co-founded G4G with magician and toy inventor Mark Setteducati and UC Berkeley professor Elwyn Berlekamp. Over the past three decades it hosted 14 biennial conferences for aficionados of the recreational mathematician and Scientific American columnist and writer Martin Gardner. Rodgers also edited 6 volumes of Martin Gardner tribute books, published by AK Peters. Rodgers' personal physical puzzle collection was legendary.

== Gathering 4 Gardner ==
Through his monthly Mathematical Games column and his extensive correspondence, Gardner had created a large network of fans and had achieved an almost cult-like status. Rodgers knew many of the other people in the ever expanding Gardner circle and a decade after Gardner stopped writing his column, Rodgers decided that a conference in his honor was merited. He managed to convince the usually shy Gardner to attend and then used Gardner's own voluminous and meticulous files to assemble a list of invitees. They called it The Gathering 4 Gardner, which was subsequently shortened to G4G. Gardner attended the first G4G in 1993 and the second, dubbed G4G2, in 1996. Since then, there has been a gathering every two years up to G4G13 in 2018, and then G4G14 in 2022, delayed because of the Covid pandemic. For the first two decades G4G was sustained mostly by Rodgers with "seemingly unfettered access to his personal time and resources."

By the time of G4G7 in 2006, the conference was attracting a wide assortment of people, including Mathematician Daina Taimina, gaming hobbyist Lou Zocchi, puzzle designer Wei-Hwa Huang, magic square expert Lee Sallows, puzzle historian David Singmaster, computer scientist and origamist Ron Resch, and spidron inventor Dániel Erdély—in addition to establishment mathematicians John H. Conway and Roger Penrose. Rogers himself was involved in each gathering up to 2012. But he was mortally ill, and G4G10 was to be his last gathering. As tradition demanded, for one day he hosted the attendees at his lavish home and Japanese gardens in north Atlanta, which was filled with his huge puzzle collection. He died just nine days later.

Subsequent G4Gs have attracted an ever increasing array of recreational mathematicians, magicians, puzzle designers, pseudoscience skeptics, jugglers, artists, game designers, origamists, toy inventors, computer scientists, philosophers, and cognitive psychologists.

== Legacy ==
Part of Martin Gardner's genius was that he attracted a circle of collaborators whose synergy dramatically deepened the knowledge of the subjects that Gardner was writing about. Rodgers, like his mentor, carried on this tradition by founding the gathering. Neil Calkin of Clemson University in a tribute to Rodgers says:

Tom's contribution to the life of the mind has been that of a catalyst: to bring together hundreds of incredible people, to give them a forum to meet, to communicate, and to interact with amazing individuals from different disciplines, to form connections, and to inspire. In 2010, I described one day at the G4G9 as the best day I've had in my life so far.

== Books ==
Rodgers frequently collaborated with other members of the Gardner circle to edit tribute books about him.

- 1999 – The Mathemagician and Pied Puzzler: A Collection in Tribute to Martin Gardner, edited by Elwyn Berlekamp & Tom Rodgers (AK Peters), ISBN 9781568810751
- 2001 – Puzzlers' Tribute: A Feast for the Mind, edited by David Wolfe & Tom Rodgers (AK Peters), ISBN 9781568811215
- 2004 – Tribute to a Mathemagician, edited by Barry Cipra, Erik Demaine, Martin Demaine & Tom Rodgers (AK Peters), ISBN 9781568812045
- 2008 – A Lifetime of Puzzles: A Collection of Puzzles in Honor of Martin Gardner's 90th Birthday, edited by Erik Demaine, Martin Demaine & Tom Rodgers (AK Peters), ISBN 9781568812458
- 2009 – Homage to a Pied Puzzler, edited by Ed Pegg Jr., Alan Schoen & Tom Rodgers (AK Peters), ISBN 9781336100640
- 2009 – Mathematical Wizardry for a Gardner, edited by Ed Pegg Jr., Alan Schoen & Tom Rodgers (AK Peters), ISBN 9781336100381
