= Explorable explanation =

Form of informational media

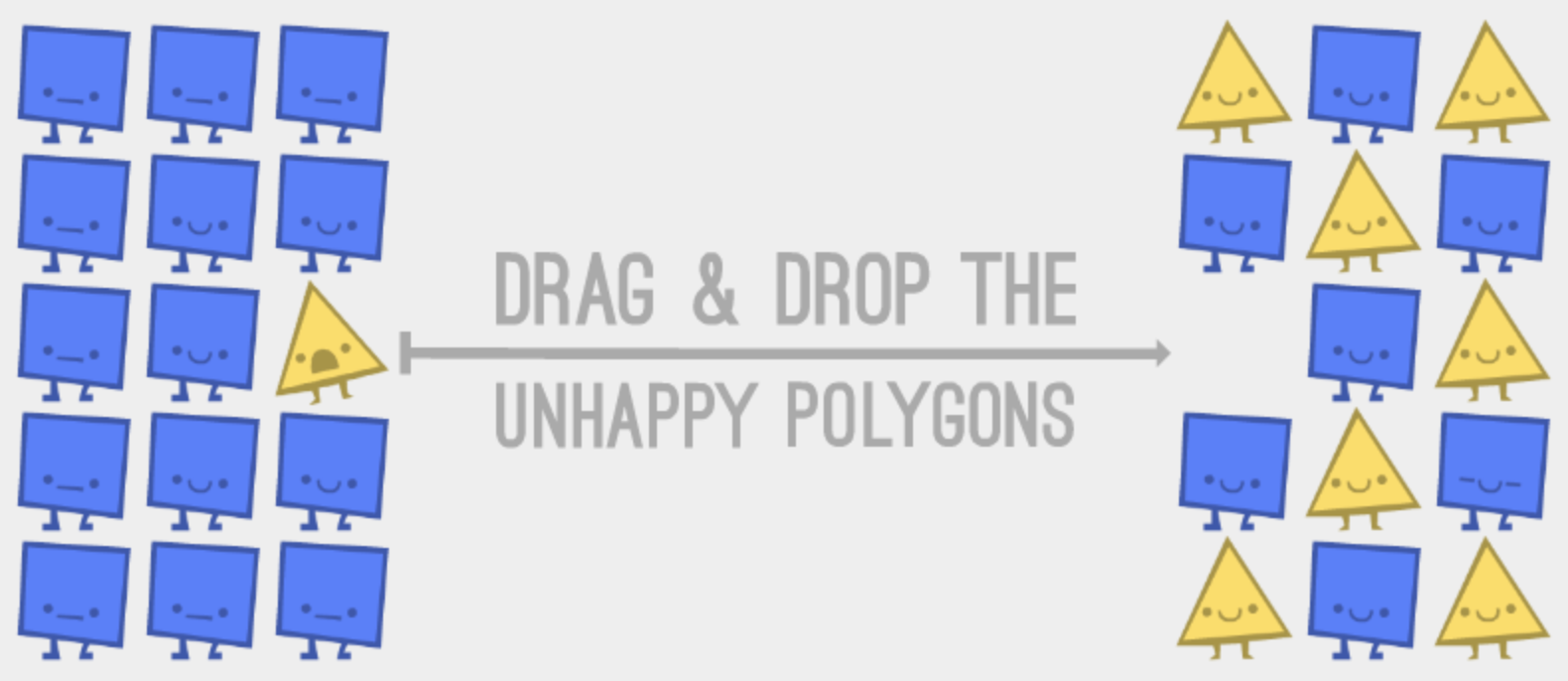
Screenshot from Parable of the Polygons by Nicky Case, an explorable explanation that simulates racial segregation, which allows the audience to control how "shapist" the entities in the simulation are.

An explorable explanation (often shortened to explorable) is a form of informational media where an interactive computer simulation of a given concept is presented, along with some form of guidance (usually prose) that suggests ways that the audience can learn from the simulation. Explorable explanations encourage users to discover things about the concept for themselves, and test their expectations of its behaviour against its actual behaviour, promoting a more active form of learning than reading or listening.

== Definition ==
The term "explorable explanation" was first used in passing by Peter Brusilovsky in a 1994 paper, but did not enter into common use until 2011, when Bret Victor published an eponymous essay (the essay included an explorable explanation of a digital filter). Victor distinguishes explorable explanations from isolated interactive widgets and visualizations by the fact that they deliberately guide the attention of their audience towards particular phenomena within the simulation. In characterizing the concept, Victor explains:

Explorable Explanations is my umbrella project for ideas that enable and encourage truly active reading. The goal is to change people's relationship with text. People currently think of text as information to be consumed. I want text to be used as an environment to think in.

Some of the ideas Victor espoused in the essay occurred to him while during work with Al Gore on the app version of the 2009 book Our Choice. He had proposed that the app should contain interactive models, but this idea was rejected on the basis that all numerical values proposed regarding climate change needed to have a citation, and the interactive models would generate un-cited numbers.

The term has since also been characterized as being about learning through play. The related term "active essays" was used by Alan Kay to refer to text-based explorable explanations, and a major goal of Squeak (the precursor to Scratch) was to allow for the creation of them.

A few video games may be considered explorable explanations. For example, Sim City uses a complex city simulation that is intended to present issues that appear in real-world urban planning. Many other games in the simulation genre have a similar intention, although with many it is not a necessity that the simulation be scientifically accurate. In the puzzle genre, games such as Incredipede also involve interacting with systems with the intention of learning. Video games may not involve explanatory text or narration.

Educational video games have an overlap with explorable explanations, summarized as:

Science-based games [...] primarily focus on creating an experience sparking intrinsic motivation, that is, students play for fun, but learn in the process, as their gaming experience requires learning concepts to proceed or provides an explorative pathway through the game that promotes learning. [...] Explorable explanations (or "explorables") come at educational games from the opposite direction: instead of "games, but with science communication added," they are "science communication, but with interactivity added".

They are similar in that both involve a computer simulation that is visualized, and both have the intended goal that the audience learns something. However, in an educational video game, the simulation is not necessarily a simulation of the game's intended learning content. Instead, learning content in educational video games is usually put in a non-interactive form such as text or voiceover; the educational game then usually has some schedule whereby the audience alternates between seeing the text and, separately, playing a game, usually a game with mechanics from a standard genre, such as a platformer.

Explorable explanations are also distinct from gamification, which has the stated intention of improving the structure of rewards in learning. An explorable explanation may or may not involve rewards, and most involve none.

== History ==
Board games such as The Landlord's Game (the precursor to Monopoly) involve a simulation and so can be described as analogue precursors to explorable explanations.

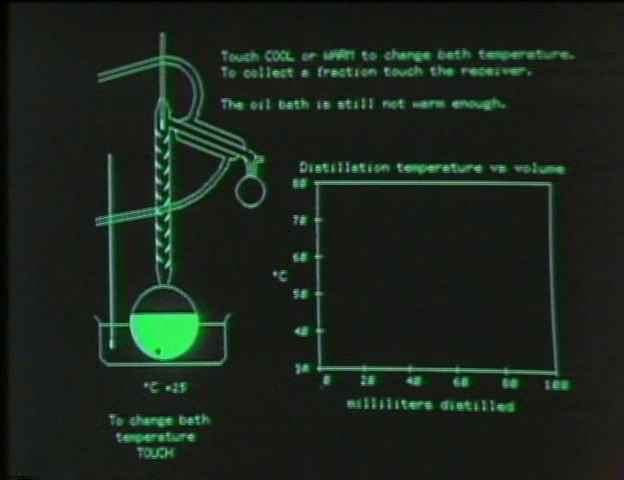
The PLATO computer system, which predates the personal computer, was the first platform for what would now be called explorable explanations

Many explorable explanations predate the popular use of the phrase. For example, the Plato system, a computer-assisted instructional system created in 1960 depicted to the right, used interactive examples to teach concepts to students. In 1996, Mitchel Resnick created an explorable explanation of emergence using Conway's Game of Life as an example.

The target audience for explorable explanations has historically been limited by available software distribution platforms (although some have been made for specific museums, without any intention of wider distribution, including some created by Karl Sims). Due to the fact that explorable explanations have not previously been successfully monetized, physical media such as CD-ROMs could not be considered. Since the 2000s, explorable explanations have become more common, because of widespread internet access and increased computer graphics possibilities within web browsers, for example via SVG, WebGL, and HTML5 canvas API. This allows complex simulations to be accessed instantly and shared on social media.

Wikipedia has some examples of basic explorable explanations.

== Subject matter ==
The most prevalent examples of explorable explanations concern topics within mathematics or computer science. There are numerous explanations of concepts within statistics and machine learning as well as of specific algorithms.

Explorable explanations have a bias towards focusing on these topics, and when the subject matter comes from disciplines of empirical science, there is a tendency to focus on quantitative models from within the discipline. This is true even in the case of explorable explanations about disciplines where quantitative models are less common, such as social science. The bias is due to the fact that explorable explanations involve a programmed simulation which is required to follow a consistent mathematical model or formal system. Jonathan Blow has argued that this requirement forces subject matter to be dealt with more rigorously than other mediums such as speculative fiction.

Additionally, since the simulation requires a visualization, there is a certain bias towards subject matter close to geometry. For example, there are at least three explorable explanations about special relativity including A Slower Speed of Light.

== Use in media ==
Explorable explanations are increasingly being created by journalists, sometimes by organisations that formerly focused on print news media and radio. In 2015, FiveThirtyEight collaborated with The Marshall Project to produce an article on prison parole assessment that included an explorable explanation of the effects of policy changes on prison populations. The article was cited by the Columbia Journalism Review as an example of how explorable explanations could be used to advance digital storytelling. Newsgames may be considered explorable explanations.

Other newsrooms such as Bloomberg Businessweek, The New York Times, and The Guardian are also notable for their use of explorable explanations to tell stories, for example covering topics like climate change, drug overdoses, and economics. FiveThirtyEight has also used explorable explanations to cover topics such as gun violence and p hacking.

== Structure ==
Screenshot of a Phet simulation, intended for use in a classroom. Since they do not involve a physically present teacher to guide the user's interaction, most explorable explanations instead provide guidance using explanatory text.

Explorable explanations can differ widely in the kind of "guidance" that they give regarding how to interact with and think about their simulations. In some cases, guidance is intended to come from teachers in a school setting; this is the approach advocated for using PhET Interactive Simulations created by Carl Wieman, and they have been found to be an effective complement to traditional chalk and talk lessons.

Most explorable explanations provide guidance using prose. This is the approach used in several explorable explanation creation platforms, including Observable created by Mike Bostock. Some others use voice-over narration.

== See also ==
- Newsgame
- PhET Interactive Simulations
- Persuasive Games
