= Julia Robinson Mathematics Festival =

Educational organization in California, US

- Abbreviation: JRMF
- Founder: Nancy Blachman
- Location: c/o SEE, 23564 Calabasas Road, Suite 201, Calabasas, CA 91302
- Coordinates: 34.1568427505449°N 118.64036832883595°W
- Key people: Nancy Blachman, Founder; Daniel Kline, Executive Director
- Website: jrmf.org

The Julia Robinson Mathematics Festival (JRMF) is an educational organization that sponsors locally organized mathematics festivals and online webinars targeting K–12 students. The events are designed to introduce students to mathematics in a collaborative and non-competitive forum.

== History ==
In the 1970s, Saint Mary's College of California produced a mathematics contest that was popular with secondary schools throughout the San Francisco Bay Area. In 2005, Nancy Blachman attended an education forum sponsored by the Mathematical Sciences Research Institute (MSRI) and remembered how the Saint Mary's contest had inspired her as a student. Unfortunately, the contest no longer existed. Seeking to possibly resurrect the contest, Blachman and MSRI development director Jim Sotiros reached out to colleagues in the educational community. One response was from local high school math teacher Joshua Zucker, who also remembered the contest and even had saved a book of problems from it. Sotiros suggested that Blachman and her husband David desJardins fund MSRI in order to hire Zucker to recreate a program in the style of the Saint Mary's Math Contest. Blachman and Zucker became co-founders and organized their first event in 2007. They called it a festival rather than a contest because they wanted to emphasize collaboration, creativity and fun rather than competition. They named the festival after Julia Robinson, a mathematician renowned for her contributions to decision problems. In fact, her work on Hilbert's 10th problem played a crucial role in its ultimate resolution. Blachman felt that such a woman would provide a role model for young girls and would show that one need not be male to be a great mathematician.

When they sent out invitations to local schools, the response was so overwhelming that, in order to have enough space, they prevailed upon Google in nearby Mountain View to host the first festival. A second festival was hosted in 2008 by Pixar Animation Studios in Emeryville. Enthusiasm and interest have spurred strong growth, and since then, there have been festivals at Princeton University (and its greater community); Stanford University; and University of California, Berkeley, and throughout the United States, as well as in Europe and Asia.

As of December 2019, JRMF will have hosted nearly 500 events in 25 states, the District of Columbia, one territory (Puerto Rico), and 15 foreign countries. In 2020, they hosted over 120 Festivals—an increase of more than 50% over 2018. The services JRMF offer continue to be free of charge. The Julia Robinson Mathematics Festival has been invited to host festivals and tables at events such as the Joint Mathematics Meeting and MAA Mathfest. In December 2019, they celebrated Julia Robinson's 100th birthday with a festival in her hometown.

== Programming ==
The Julia Robinson Mathematics Festival has hosted festivals in over 15 countries and 25 states and territories.

=== COVID-19 Response ===
In order to help families cope with COVID-19, the Julia Robinson Mathematics Festival, under the leadership of Hector Rosario, launched the JRMF Webinar Series on March 26, 2020. In this weekly series, they explore an activity that they use at their festivals. In order to serve the national and international communities, they host three sessions of the same seminar every Thursday, from 7 AM to 7 PM EDT, in three languages - English, Spanish and Hebrew. Participants from the US, Europe, Asia, Africa and the Middle East come to attend. Many community members and volunteers have joined the JRMF team as facilitators to lead breakout rooms in order to provide closer attention to each participant for learning and brainstorming.

== Support ==
Since its founding, JRMF has had the support of many people and organizations, including dedicated mentors and volunteers, the founding host MSRI, and the American Institute of Mathematics (AIM), which has been a fiscal sponsor since 2013. JRMF has also frequently partnered with various educational, corporate, and mathematical organizations including The National Association of Math Circles, The National Museum of Mathematics, ThinkFun, and Gathering 4 Gardner (G4G). Among The "Friends of JRMF" are David Eisenbud, Gary Antonick, Peter Norvig, Vi Hart, and Megan Smith.
