= Parable of the Polygons =

Explorable explanation about diversity and social segregation

- The two characters, a triangle and a square
- Website type: Blog post
- Creators: Vi Hart and Nicky Case
- Website: ncase.me/polygons/
- Content license: Public domain

Parable of the Polygons is a 2014 explorable explanation created by Vi Hart and Nicky Case. The article focuses on a society of blue squares and yellow triangles which have slight personal biases against diversity, which leads to social segregation. It is based on game theorist Thomas Schelling's papers about residential segregation. The article was well-received, especially its visual and playable aspects, and was called a useful educational tool for topics like racial segregation.

== Content ==
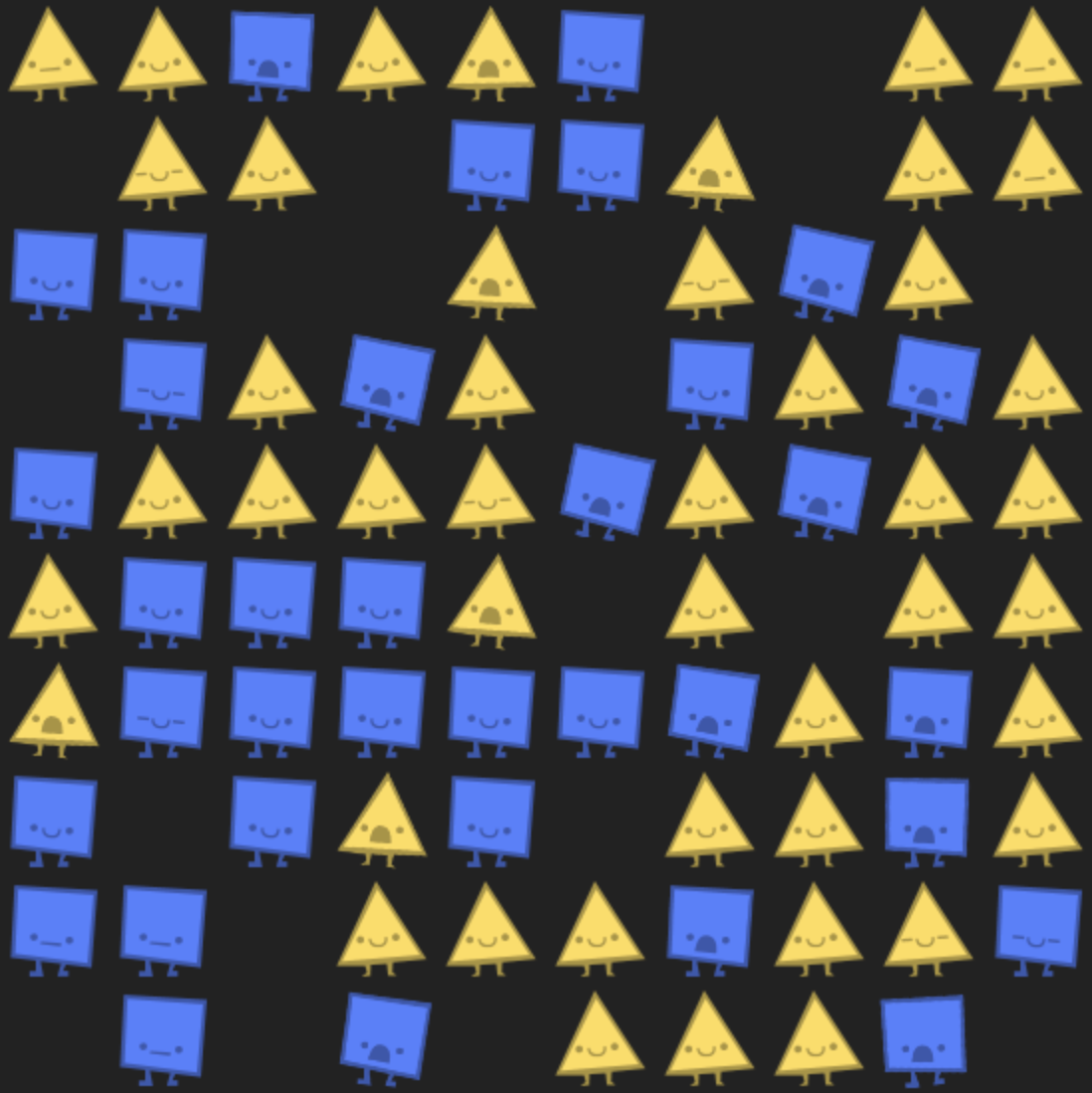
A randomly generated board containing segregated squares and triangles

The article is an interactive blog post, "part story and part game". It has a model consisting of a society of blue squares and yellow triangles, presented in a grid. At the top of the article, a crowd of triangles and squares are wiggling. Just under, it says, "This is a story of how harmless choices can make a harmful world." The article first demonstrates step-by-step how institutional bias can occur even when there is little personal bias against diversity, and individuals are well-intentioned. The article describes the squares and triangles as "slightly shapist". In the first example, a square or triangle is happy only if at least a third of its neighbors are of the same shape as it is. The shapes prefer a diverse neighborhood, adopting a meh face in a homogeneous neighborhood.

At this point, the article lets the reader interact with the model. The reader's goal is to make all residents happy with where they live, by moving only unhappy shapes. At first, the bias is easily managed; however, as the population grows, the shapes' bias quickly leads to visually segregated areas. The article reads: "Sometimes a neighborhood just becomes square, and it's not their fault if no triangles wanna stick around. And a triangular neighborhood would welcome a square, but they can't help it if squares ain't interested."

The reader can later execute automated simulations, and increase and decrease the shapes' bias. When the bias is increased, the segregation is more prominent. A subsequent iteration of the game shows that decreasing bias does not make a difference if the population started out segregated. Shapes then have to reject the default scenario of segregation in favor of seeking out the other shapes. Finally, the reader can generate new models using a sandbox.

The article departs from Schelling's work by discussing a demand for "even the smallest bit of diversity" which reverses residential segregation; Case said that the article teaches that such segregation is "easily offset" with a "small amount of anti-bias", even if bias is still present. The article also departs from Schelling by concluding with encouraging words on how to enact change. The article concludes with: "If you're all triangles, you're missing out on some amazing squares in your life – that's unfair to everyone. Reach out, beyond your immediate neighbors."

== Development and release ==
Vi Hart and Nicky Case, creator of Coming Out Simulator 2014, teamed up following a talk on the lack of tech event diversity and women in STEM delivered by Hart, which convinced Case "of the necessity of active measures". The article applies ideas from game theorist and economist Thomas Schelling's 1971 paper Dynamic Models of Segregation.

Case described Schelling's model as "perfect – simple and fun to play"; Schelling played his own model on a chess board or graph paper with nickels and dimes, moving them one by one. Case said that they were "fascinated with taking models/systems from the arts [and] humanities, and translating them into game models/systems". The second part of the article was based on a "new surprising aspect of Schelling's model", which introduced a nonconformity bias. Case said that by playing around with variables, they found that "just as a small bias can turn a society segregated, a small anti-bias can reverse that". Hart said they knew that nonconformity would mix up the population, but that they were "pleasantly surprised to see it work even [at a] very minimum level". Case said that the article ends on an "optimistic note" that "small local changes really can change institutions from the bottom-up". Development of the article began in September 2014.

The goal of Parable of the Polygons was for readers to "learn to demand diversity". People are represented by abstract shapes because marking their races and genders would be "really weird" and "have the unfortunate implication that [the races and genders] are binary and immutable". A triangle was chosen because it appears in Hart's videos. The article contains few words, and the ability to move shapes is introduced "slowly and deliberately". Hart said that they felt that "it was important to start with moving the shapes by hand, so that later when shapes move automatically [the reader would know] there's nothing going on behind [their] back". The article provides readers with interactive sections governed by simple rules to help them prove the counter-intuitive results to themselves. Case said that there was "an effort made to keep players from being scared off by the big stuff"; thus, the article includes jokes, slang, and "cute and friendly shapes". Hart said that they wanted to make sure to explain systemic bias without changing the readers' "minds". Case said that a main message was "[not to] take it personally" because "large collective bias can exist even with small individual bias".

In the face of large systematic problems, it can feel impossible to tackle, and that small local efforts are useless. I used to feel that way. But I now realize that not only do small local efforts help, but it's the only way any real, lasting societal change is made.

— Nicky Case, in Jess Joho, "The next time someone doesn't understand systemic prejudice, send them this game", Kill Screen (2014)

The article was released in December 2014; Hart noted that "matters of systematic bias [were] even more topical [at the moment]", and Case said, "There's a huge gap between the racial proportions of the police force and the neighborhoods they're policing, that both reinforces and results from racial tensions." Case said that Schelling's models could be identified in that "a black officer [had led] the police force one night" amidst the Ferguson unrest. Hart described the reaction to the article as "more positive than anything [Hart's] ever done" and "almost disturbingly eerie". Case said: "It's been surprisingly positive and polite, especially for something that touches on a touchy subject!" Hart said that they planned to "tweak some stuff after release", but did not because the reception was "so overwhelmingly positive". Case said that the article was doing "shockingly well", so any fixes "might weaken or confuse the message" when applied.

The art and code of Parable of the Polygons was made open-source, being released under the Creative Commons Zero public domain license. A remixed version which includes a green pentagon was made the same year and is featured at the bottom of the article: Several playtesters suggested more than two groups for the later simulations, and the authors wanted to include the green pentagon in the source code and on the bottom of the page to reinforce that race or gender aren't binary, but didn't want to complicate the model. Several translations were also created based on the source code, and are linked on the main header of the post.

== Reception ==
The critical reception for the article was overwhelmingly positive. Joanna Rothkopf of Salon called the article "an adorable and eloquent primer on issues of segregation". Columbia Journalism Review's Chava Gourarie described the article as "a cute, engaging, playable explanation". Aatish Bhatia of Wired described the design and characters as "charming" and "delightfully animated".

The playable aspect of the article received praise. Kill Screen's Jess Joho wrote, "Parable of the Polygons asks you to tackle Schelling's concepts in a way only a game could." Bhatia called the article "a truly interactive way of communicating an idea". Jesse Singal of The Cut called the article "a really well-done use of the web".

Singal noted the article's parallels to human behavior. Bhatia said that the article delivers an "effective, lucid and very relevant" lesson on real-world segregation, race and equality. Laura Moss of Mother Nature Network said that it "accurately illustrates racially segregated neighborhoods", and noted that the article illustrates "Schelling's three major findings": the effect of slight individual bias, the starting game state and the reluctancy to become more diverse, and the necessity of intervention "in creating and maintaining diversity". Joho said that "demonstrating a difficult reality while still maintaining a sense of actionable hope" was the article's "greatest achievement by far".

Gamasutra's Phill Cameron praised the article for using triangles and squares and effectively dissociating itself from "the prejudices of real life". Bhatia said that the article does not get "embroiled in a heated political debate". Joho wrote that the article is "careful not to throw blame around", and that it constantly emphasizes that personal biases might be "unexamined, unintentional, or even unconscious". The Washington Post's Ana Swanson said that the call to action is a "powerful" message. Polygon's Megan Farokhmanesh wrote, "Half game, half informational post, Parable of the Polygons wants to encourage people to talk about topics like racism and sexism in healthy, constructive ways."

Amanda Montañez wrote in a Scientific American blog that the shapes assume that "their individual preference for diversity is sufficient to propel their society toward integration", but that "the social system in which they operate prohibits it". Montañez said that "true progress requires a more active, dramatic shift than expected" and that, in the article, "the complacent squares and triangles must abandon their preconceptions about the nature of 'shapism' and adopt a new, activist stance on integration". Montañez compared the idea of using two-dimensional geometric shapes to represent people to the 1884 illustrated novella Flatland by Edwin Abbott Abbott.
