= Joint Policy Board for Mathematics =

Organization

The Joint Policy Board for Mathematics (JPBM) consists of the American Mathematical Society, the American Statistical Association, the Mathematical Association of America, and the Society for Industrial and Applied Mathematics.

The Board has nearly 55,000 mathematicians and scientists who are members of the four organizations.

Each April, the JPBM celebrates Mathematics and Statistics Awareness Month (previously, the month was called Mathematics Awareness Month) to increase public understanding of and appreciation for mathematics and statistics. The event was renamed by the JPBM in 2017. To simplify coordination efforts, the JPBM also decided in 2017 that there will no longer be an annual assigned theme for the month. This celebration of mathematics, and now mathematics and statistics, began as Mathematics Awareness Week in 1986.

== JPBM Communications Award ==
Each January at the Joint Mathematics Meeting the JPBM gives its Communications Award to a journalist or other communicator for bringing accurate mathematical information to non-mathematical audiences.

=== JPBM Communications Award winners ===
- 2026: Noah Giansiracusa
- 2025: Eugenia Cheng
- 2024: Natalie Dean
- 2023: Grant Sanderson and Jordan Ellenberg
- 2022: Talithia Williams
- 2021: John Bailer, Richard Campbell, Rosemary Pennington, and Erica Klarreich
- 2020: Christopher Budd and James Tanton
- 2019: Margot Lee Shetterly
- 2018: Vi Hart and Matt Parker
- 2017: Siobhan Roberts, for Expository and Popular Books, and Arthur T. Benjamin, for Public Outreach
- 2016: Simon Singh, for Expository and Popular Books, and the National Museum of Mathematics, for Public Outreach
- 2015: Nate Silver
- 2014: Danica McKellar
- 2013: John Allen Paulos
- 2012: Dana Mackenzie
- 2011: Nicolas Falacci and Cheryl Heuton
- 2010: Marcus du Sautoy
- 2009: George Csicsery
- 2008: Carl Bialik
- 2007: Steven H. Strogatz
- 2006: Roger Penrose
- 2005: Barry Arthur Cipra
- 2003: Robert Osserman
- 2002: Helaman Ferguson and Claire Ferguson
- 2001: Keith J. Devlin
- 2000: Sylvia Nasar
- 1999: Ian Stewart
- 1998: Constance Reid
- 1997: Philip J. Davis
- 1996: Gina Kolata
- 1994: Martin Gardner
- 1993: Joel Schneider
- 1991: Ivars Peterson
- 1990: Hugh Whitemore
- 1988: James Gleick
