= Nancy Blachman =

American academic

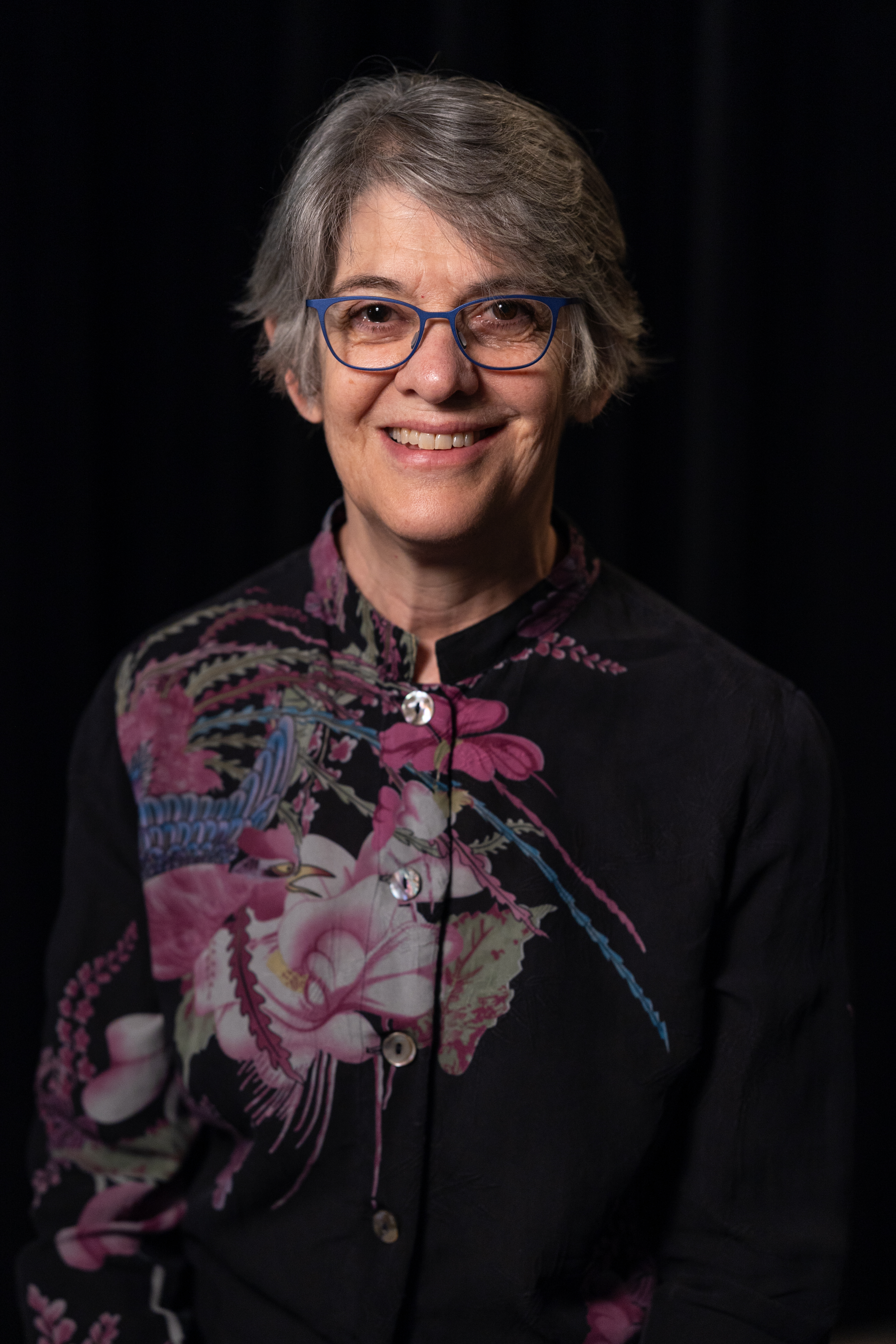
- Nancy Blachman at SXSW in 2024
- Born: 1956 (age 69–70); Palo Alto, California
- Scientific career
- Fields: Mathematics Education

Nancy Blachman (born 1956 in Palo Alto, CA) is an American educator, supporter of recreational mathematics and mathematical outreach, software book author, and supporter of indie documentary films. In 2007, she founded the Julia Robinson Mathematics Festival (JRMF), which has grown into a successful math enrichment enterprise for teenagers in the USA and beyond. She is a long time supporter of the educational foundation Gathering 4 Gardner. She is a former chair and remains on the advisory board of Berkeley’s Industrial Engineering and Operations Research Department (IEOR).

== Early life and education ==
Nancy Blachman was born in 1956 in Palo Alto, California, her father Nelson being an electrical engineer. The family spent some time living in Spain in the 1960s, and Nancy's interest in mathematics began during high school back in Palo Alto when she took a course based on George Polya's Mathematics and Plausible Reasoning. She was also inspired by the mathematics contest produced by Saint Mary's College of California then popular with secondary schools throughout the San Francisco Bay Area.

She did undergraduate work at University of California, San Diego (1974 to 1976), got honours B.Sc. in applied mathematics from the University of Birmingham in the UK (1978), an M.S. in operations research from University of California, Berkeley (1979) and an M.S. in computer science at Stanford University (1988).

== Mathematics in education ==
Blachman taught a course in problem solving with Mathematica at Stanford from 1990 to 1997.

In 2004 she created Google Guide, an online interactive tutorial and reference about the capabilities of Google.

In 2005 while attending an education forum that promoted STEM [Science, Technology, Engineering, and Math] she remembered how the Saint Mary's College Mathematics Contest had inspired her as a student. Working with Joshua Zucker and Jim Sotiros she decided to revive the structure and spirit of this long defunct competition. This led to the founding of the Julia Robinson Mathematics Festival in 2007. JRMF events now occur throughout the United States and have reached more than 100,000 students worldwide.

Blachman has been a board member of Gathering 4 Gardner since 2008, served as its chair from 2012 to 2020, and is currently board president.

She is the president and founder of Variable Symbols, a company that provides training, books, and tools to make complex software easier to use.

== Indie documentary films ==
Blachman has been working since 2015 with filmmakers to shine a light on people in difficult situations, to uplift marginalized voices, humanize them, and make their stories accessible—with the aim of encouraging viewers to take action. Documentaries she has supported include Aftershock, Art Spiegelman: Disaster is My Muse, Ailey, Athlete A, Counted Out, Crip Camp, Dark Money, Free for All, Patrice: The Movie, The Fight, and The Social Dilemma.

== Personal life ==
On January 1, 1999, she married David desJardins. They have two children, Sarah and Louis.

== Books ==
- The Mathematica Graphics Guidebook, by Cameron Smith and Nancy Blachman, Addison Wesley (1995), ISBN 0201532808
- Mathematica: A Practical Approach, by Nancy Blachman and Colin Williams, Prentice-Hall (1993) ISBN 0135638267
- Mathematica quick reference, version 2, by Nancy Blachman, Addison-wesley (1992), ISBN 0201628805
- Maple V Quick Reference, by N. Blachman and M. Mossinghoff, Brooks/Cole Pub. Co (1992)
