= Mark Setteducati =

American inventor of magic, illusions, and puzzles

- Born: November 1, 1955 (age 71); New York City, NY
- Occupations: Magician, author

Mark Setteducati (born November 1, 1955) is an American magician and inventor of illusions, games and puzzles. He is also an author, known for the book The Magic Show, which he co-authored with Anne Benkovitz. He is featured on the PBS "Inventors" list.

== Early life and education ==
Setteducati was born in New York City, NY and grew up in Emerson, New Jersey. He received his BFA in Art and Design from the School of Visual Arts in Manhattan, New York. He later became a member of the faculty, where he created and taught the first ever toy and game design class, which allowed students to be able to receive a BFA with a major in Toy Design.

== Career ==
From 1975 to 1980, Setteducati was the assistant to artist, Louise Bourgeois, and in 1992 he performed Magic in “She Lost it”, a performance piece by Bourgeois at The Fabric Workshop in Philadelphia.

After working as an in-house designer for Astra Trading and teaching design at his alma mater, he decided to become a full-time independent inventor. His first invention that he licensed was in 1981, Rubik Game, a game where you play tic-tac-toe on a Rubik’s Cube. Later he developed and designed Rubik's Illusion, which later would lead to a project with the Harry Potter franchise.

Throughout his career, Setteducati developed and licensed puzzles and games to toy companies around the world. In 1986, he designed a game travel version of the Wheel of Fortune game show, which went on to sell millions of copies, and as well as the travel versions of Jeopardy! and the Dating Game. A year later in 1987, he designed his first magic set with Harry Blackstone, Jr. that was produced by Pressman Toy Company.

In 1994, Setteducati created the "Magic Works" brand for Milton Bradley, an all-time best-selling line of magic tricks that are geared towards children.

Setteducati co-founded Gathering 4 Gardner, along with Tom M. Rodgers and Elwyn Berlekamp, and for many years served as its president.

Released by Jumbo in 1994, Setteducati's "Magic Showcase" offered performers instant acts.

Setteducati co-created and invented Ji Ga Zo with Ken Knowlton, a universal jigsaw puzzle system, debuted in Japan and in 2011, it started being distributed by Hasbro in the United States.

In 2013, Setteducati was featured on PBS Digital Studio series, "Inventors", which is produced by David Friedman.

The Academy of Magical Arts awarded Setteducati the Creative Fellowship Award for 2014, and an honorary lifetime membership to The Magic Castle, Hollywood, California.

== Honors and awards ==
Award	Organization	Year	Result
Leslie P Guest Award	Society of American Magicians	1994	Won
I.D. I. O. T.	Int'l Designer & Inventor of Toys	2002	Won
Medal of Honor	National Arts Club	2008	Won
Innovative Toy	Japan	2010	Won
Tagie Award (nominated)	Chicago Toy and Game Fair	2013	Nominated
Creative Fellowship	Academy of Magical Arts	2015	Won

== Other work ==
He is a member of the educational non-profit corporation, Gathering 4 Gardner.

== Personal life ==
Setteducati has over ten thousand pens, he is the largest novelty pen collector in the world.
