= Nicky Case =

Canadian indie game developer

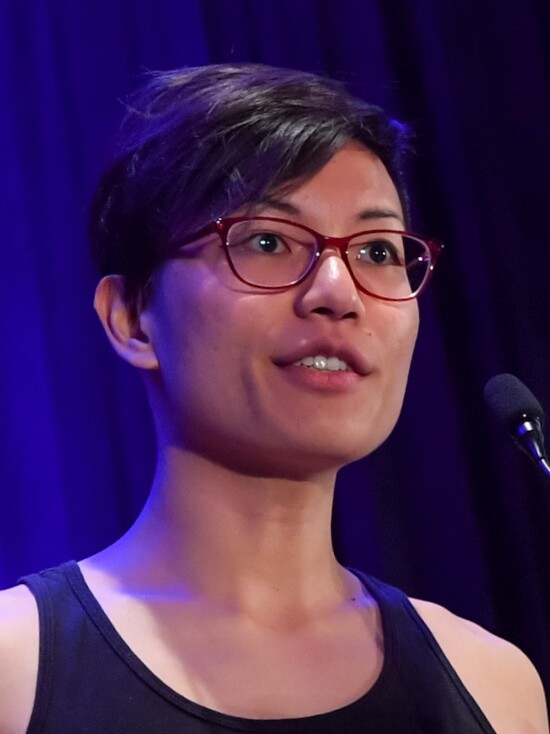
- Case in 2019
- Born: September 11, 1994 (age 32) Singapore
- Occupation: Indie game developer
- Known for: Game development
- Notable work: Coming Out Simulator 2014 and Parable of the Polygons
- Website: https://ncase.me

Nicky Case (born September 11, 1994) is a Canadian indie game developer, web designer, and critical theorist. She has developed interactive websites and online video games such as Coming Out Simulator, Explorable Explanations, We Become What We Behold and Parable of the Polygons. Case's works are characterized by her recurring goal to "help people understand complex systems", presenting dilemmas and potential resolutions in a philosophical manner. Case has also collaborated with theorists and academics such as Stefano Gualeni, Vi Hart and Bret Victor.

Besides designing and developing games, Case has been active on her website and blog, ncase.me, regularly updating posts, short stories and comics about mental health, games and media culture, COVID-19 safety, and social science, among others. She has also written educational blog posts teaching mathematics, how to code, and how to make games.

== Career ==
Case began game development at a young age of 13 through the creation of various independent flash games on the media platform Newgrounds. Case's first entry into the gaming industry was an internship at Electronic Arts (EA), with the help of a Newgrounds game made by Case (literally titled :the game:) that became popular.

Despite saying that EA was queer-friendly – describing it as "...ahead of the time for queer acceptance" – Case said that she was inspired to become independent by the way that projects could fall through any moment at EA. As of 2023, she has made 42 websites, games, videos, blogs, and other content, all of them available on her official website.

=== First independent projects and Coming Out Simulator 2014 ===
Through a crowdfunding platform, Case funded her first independent project, Nothing to Hide. During the project, however, Case worked on a few side projects that turned out to be more successful than the game itself. The first was an instructional tutorial on how the shadows worked in the game, and the second was a submission for the Nar8 Game Jam4 for which she made Coming Out Simulator 2014. Coming Out Simulator told her personal story about coming out to her parents as bisexual and the consequences thereof, though, as opposed to reality, the game had multiple endings, depending on the choices by the player. The response to the game was very positive. It was nominated to the Independent Games Festival's 2015 edition in the Excellence in Narrative category, and Case even received emails from queer individuals who related to and felt seen by the game. These side steps were her first foray into interactive and exploratory design.

=== Parable of the Polygons ===
The shadow explainer also achieved success and reached the front page of the image website Imgur, and Case was approached by interaction designer Bret Victor to join a workshop where she met Vi Hart, an educative YouTuber with a focus on mathematics. This led to a collaboration project named Parable of the Polygons, an interactive explanation about the complications of bias and discrimination. It received overwhelmingly positive critical reception, with Salon's Joanna Rothkopf calling it "an adorable and eloquent primer on the issues of segregation".

With the popularity of the shadow explainer, Parable of the Polygons and following interactive games, Nicky Case began to gain prominence as an interactive designer. It "became [her] mission to explore the yet vastly under-explored medium of interactivity". And they began to help others with this pursuit as well by establishing Explorable Explanations, a platform where users could make and publish interactive articles .

=== Adventures with Anxiety ===
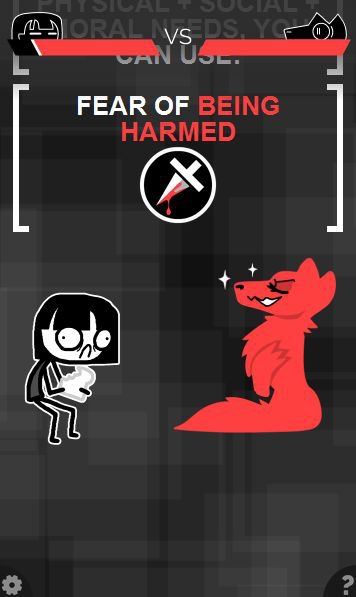
Adventures with Anxiety screenshot

Case's latest release took a slight step away from system-based gameplay, and back to the more narrative interactivity of Coming Out Simulator 2014. Adventures with Anxiety represents Case's own struggles with accepting and coping with anxiety disorder. The game's intent was to help teach players how to have a better relationship with themselves as well as with other people. In an interview with Storybench, Case explains that games are her format of choice, just like a musician uses song to express themselves. For Case, "[she] could use the choices in the game to force the player to reflect on, and express, their own deepest fears and then create a healthier relationship with those fears".

Adventures with Anxiety, along with some of her other projects, are public domain, and the webpage of the games feature the full source code for free. Case explains that she benefited greatly from the public open source codes of others when she started out making games. She wants to pay it forward and stimulate others to make games as well.

=== Other works ===
Case released Nothing to Hide, a stealth game prototype, in 2013. The surveillance/privacy-themed video game prototype was crowdfunded and opened under CC0 on GitHub between 2013 and 2015.

Gameplay of We Become What We Behold

In 2016, Case released We Become What We Behold, a game about yellow journalism and vicious cycles.

In 2017, Case released the interactive presentation The Evolution of Trust. In an attempt to explain the Christmas truce and the rise of mistrust in modern society, The Evolution of Trust uses a prisoner's dilemma–like thought experiment. As the presentation goes on, most optimal play styles to the experiment are discussed, and the experiment is expanded upon to include factors like human mistakes and repeated interactions.

During the COVID-19 pandemic, Case has also released an explainer about the spread of COVID-19 and how they interact with lockdown measures, and an awareness comic about the use and need for contact tracing apps that are surveillance-free.

== Personal life ==
Case is a trans woman and has chosen to be referred to in female or gender-neutral terms. She was born in Singapore and moved with her family to Vancouver when she was young.
