= Natalie Dean =

American biostatistician (born 1987)

Natalie E. Dean
- Born: Natalie Mae Exner; September 24, 1987 (age 39)
- Education: Phillips Academy; Boston University; Harvard University
- Scientific career
- Workplaces: World Health Organization; University of Florida
- Thesis: Surveillance Methods for Monitoring HIV Incidence and Drug Resistance. (2014)
- Website: www.nataliexdean.com

Natalie E. Dean (née Exner; born 1987) is an American biostatistician specializing in infectious disease epidemiology. Dean is currently an associate professor of biostatistics at the Emory University. Her research involves epidemiological modeling of outbreaks, including Ebola, Zika and COVID-19.

== Early life and education ==
Dean was born to Christine and Paul Exner. She grew up in Reading, Massachusetts, and attended Phillips Academy. She became interested in infectious diseases during high school. While Dean briefly considered becoming an experimental microbiologist, she quickly recognized that she preferred the computer to the laboratory.

In 2009, Dean earned a B.A. in mathematics/statistics and biology from Boston University, where she was first introduced to epidemiology. During her undergraduate degree she was inducted into the Phi Beta Kappa honor society. In 2011, Dean earned an A.M. master's degree in biostatistics from Harvard University where she developed surveillance methods to better understand the incidence of HIV. Dean received a PhD in biostatistics in 2014 with a dissertation on Surveillance methods for monitoring HIV incidence & drug resistance under the supervision of Marcello Pagano.

== Research and career ==
In May 2014, Dean moved to Florida, where she joined the World Health Organization as a statistical consultant. In this capacity she designed surveys that could evaluate the drug resistant mutations to HIV treatment. In 2015 she joined the University of Florida Center for Statistics in Quantitative Infectious Diseases (CSQUID), where she worked as a postdoctoral researcher with Ira Longini. At CSQUID Dean conducts epidemiological analysis of disease outbreaks. She worked on the design of a vaccine trial for the Ebola virus epidemic in Guinea, which made use of a ring vaccination strategy. The ring vaccination approach had previously been used to eradicate smallpox in the 1970s. This strategy randomly selects and vaccinates the contacts of Ebola virus cases, and organizes populations into delayed and immediate-vaccination clusters. The ring vaccination approach was shown to be highly effective, and was replicated in the Democratic Republic of the Congo in 2018. Dean also studied asymptomatic Ebola cases.

After her success with the Ebola vaccine, Dean started to work on Zika virus. There were concerns that Zika virus caused microcephaly. Dean worked with Longini to better predict the spread of the infection through the Americas. She has described how challenging it is to design and evaluate effective vaccinations during public health emergencies, and why researchers must be both flexible and responsive.

Dean has provided expert commentary to the media and public throughout the COVID-19 pandemic. She has continued to work with the World Health Organization on the evaluation of a coronavirus vaccine. Mashable described Dean as one of the top coronavirus disease researchers to follow on Twitter. In discussion with her alma mater Phillips Academy, Dean commented that the response of the research community to coronavirus disease was remarkable, "There are a lot of people working very hard on the same problem. When you have that type of collaboration, we could have success earlier". She believed that the United States official death figures underestimated the number of people who were being lost to coronavirus disease because people who die at home are less likely to be counted.

In mid-April 2020 it became evident that parts of the United States wanted to end the lockdown and "reopen" again. When asked whether the benchmarks to relax social distancing had been achieved, Dean remarked that not only had they not been reached, but they were not ambitious enough, "These are unprecedented times, and so we need to think on a scale that would previously be considered unimaginable". In some parts of the world, politicians described a SARS-CoV-2 containment strategy that included herd immunity. In late April 2020, a study indicated that only 20% of people in New York City had been exposed to coronavirus disease, which is considerably below the level of infection required to achieve herd immunity. Dean and Carl Bergstrom wrote an opinion piece for The New York Times outlining the problems associated with politicians leading with policies of herd immunity. She argued that the reason the virus spread as fast as it did was because no one in the world was immune to it, and that to try and reach herd immunity without a vaccination would result in "a very large proportion of the [United States] population" becoming infected.

== Awards ==
Dean was recognised with the JPBM communications award in 2024 "for a remarkable record of public engagement providing clear meaning and context to COVID models and predictions through traditional and social media".

== Personal life ==
Dean married Ethan Wesley Dean in May 2014.

== Selected works and publications ==
- Henao-Restrepo, Ana Maria; Longini, Ira M; Egger, Matthias; Dean, Natalie E; Edmunds, W John; Camacho, Anton; Carroll, Miles W; Doumbia, Moussa; Draguez, Bertrand; Duraffour, Sophie; Enwere, Godwin (29 August 2015). "Efficacy and effectiveness of an rVSV-vectored vaccine expressing Ebola surface glycoprotein: interim results from the Guinea ring vaccination cluster-randomised trial". The Lancet. 386 (9996): 857–866. doi:10.1016/S0140-6736(15)61117-5. hdl:10144/575218. ISSN 0140-6736. PMID 26248676. Wikidata ()
- Henao-Restrepo, Ana Maria; Camacho, Anton; Longini, Ira M; Watson, Conall H; Edmunds, W John; Egger, Matthias; Carroll, Miles W; Dean, Natalie E; Diatta, Ibrahima; Doumbia, Moussa; Draguez, Bertrand (4 February 2017). "Efficacy and effectiveness of an rVSV-vectored vaccine in preventing Ebola virus disease: final results from the Guinea ring vaccination, open-label, cluster-randomised trial (Ebola Ça Suffit!)". The Lancet. 389 (10068): 505–518. doi:10.1016/S0140-6736(16)32621-6. ISSN 0140-6736. PMC 5364328. PMID 28017403. Wikidata ()
- Zhang, Qian; Sun, Kaiyuan; Chinazzi, Matteo; Pastore y Piontti, Ana; Dean, Natalie E.; Rojas, Diana Patricia; Merler, Stefano; Mistry, Dina; Poletti, Piero; Rossi, Luca; Bray, Margaret (25 April 2017). "Spread of Zika virus in the Americas". Proceedings of the National Academy of Sciences. 114 (22): E4334–E4343. Bibcode:2017PNAS..114E4334Z. doi:10.1073/pnas.1620161114. ISSN 0027-8424. PMC 5465916. PMID 28442561. Wikidata ()
