= Barry Arthur Cipra =

American mathematician

Barry Arthur Cipra, an American mathematician and freelance writer, regularly contributes to Science magazine and SIAM News, a monthly publication of the Society for Industrial and Applied Mathematics. Along with Dana Mackenzie and Paul Zorn he is the author of several of the volumes in the American Mathematical Society series What's Happening in the Mathematical Sciences, a collection of articles about recent results in pure and applied mathematics oriented towards the undergraduate mathematics major.

== Biography ==
Cipra got his Ph.D. from University of Maryland College Park in 1980. He was an instructor at The Massachusetts Institute of Technology and at Ohio State University. He was an assistant professor of mathematics at St. Olaf College in Northfield, Minnesota. Cipra received the 1991 Merten M. Hasse Prize from the Mathematical Association of America for his work on the Ising model. In 2005 he received the JPBM Communications Award.

== Bibliography ==
- What’s Happening in the Mathematical Sciences: Digits of Pi
- The Best of the 20th Century: Editors Name Top 10 Algorithms SIAM News, Vol 33, No 4
- Cipra, Barry Arthur (1998). Zorn, Paul (ed.). What's Happening in the Mathematical Sciences, Volume 4. American Mathematical Society. p. 103. ISBN 0-8218-0766-8.
- Algebraic Geometers see Ideal Approach to Biology SIAM News, Vol 40, No 6
- The Ising Model Is NP-Complete SIAM News, Vol 33, No 6.
- Engineers Look to Kalman Filtering for Guidance SIAM News, Vol. 26, No. 5, August 1993.
- Getting a Grip on Elliptic Curves, Jan 1989, Science, Volume 243, Issue 4887, pp. 30–31
- Misteaks, And How to Find Them Before the Teacher Does, Boston : Academic Press, 1989, ISBN 012174695X
- Tribute to a Mathemagician (co-edited with Erik Demaine, Martin Demaine & Tom M. Rodgers), AK Peters (2004), ISBN 9781568812045
