= John Bailer =

American statistician

John Bailer is an American statistician. He retired as University Distinguished Professor of Statistics at Miami University in Ohio, USA in 2022. He was also affiliated with the Departments of Media, Journalism and Film, Biology and Sociology and Gerontology at Miami. His work focused on risk assessment in occupational health, and combining journalism to statistics. He created the podcast Stats+Stories, which “Addresses The Story Behind The Statistics And The Statistics Behind The Stories.” It is sponsored by the American Statistical Association and is hosted on National Public Radio podcasts and other podcast locations. In 2021, Bailer and his podcast colleagues received the JBPM Communications Award.

Bailer received his PhD in Biostatistics from University of North Carolina in 1986. He is a fellow of the American Statistical Association and of the Society for Risk Analysis, an elected member of the International Statistical Institute and an elected fellow of the American Association for the Advancement of Science. He has received several Distinguished Teaching awards at Miami University, and the American Statistical Association Founders Award. He was a member of the Executive Committee of the International Statistical Institute 2013-2021, serving the last two years as president.

He has published some 150 peer-reviewed papers and five books.

== Publications ==
- Piegorsch W.W. and Bailer A.J. (1997) Statistics for Environmental Biology and Toxicology. Chapman and Hall: London.
- Piegorsch W.W. and Bailer A.J. (2000) Solutions Manual for Statistics for Environmental Biology and Toxicology. Chapman and Hall/CRC: Boca Raton, FL.
- Piegorsch W.W. and Bailer A.J. (2005) Analyzing Environmental Data. John Wiley & Sons: West Sussex, England.
- Bailer A.J. (2010) Statistical Programming in SAS. SAS Press: Cary, NC. (Kindle version: Dec. 2010).
- Bailer A.J. (2019) Statistical Programming in SAS 2nd Ed. Chapman and Hall/ CRC Press: Boca Raton, FL.
- Bailer A.J. and Pennington, R. (2022) Statistics Behind the Headlines. ASA-CRC Series on Statistical Reasoning in Science and Society. Chapman and Hall/ CRC Press: Boca Raton London NY.
- Bailer A.J. and Pennington, R. (2024) Statistics Behind the Headlines. AUDIOBOOK (freely available Spotify).
