= Coming Out Simulator 2014 =

2014 video game

- Cover art
- Developer: Nicky Case
- Platform: Web browser
- Release: 30 June 2014
- Genre: Interactive fiction
- Mode: Single-player

Coming Out Simulator 2014 is a 2014 interactive fiction video game made by Canadian developer Nicky Case. It is a semi-autobiographical game in which players re-enact Case's real and fictional experiences relating to coming out to their parents. Case, who identifies as bisexual, developed the game in two weeks for a game jam. Following release, reviewers praised Coming Out Simulator for its writing and emotional resonance, and it has received academic attention for its qualities as an empathy game or serious game. The game was nominated for the Excellence in Narrative award at the 2015 Independent Games Festival.

== Gameplay ==
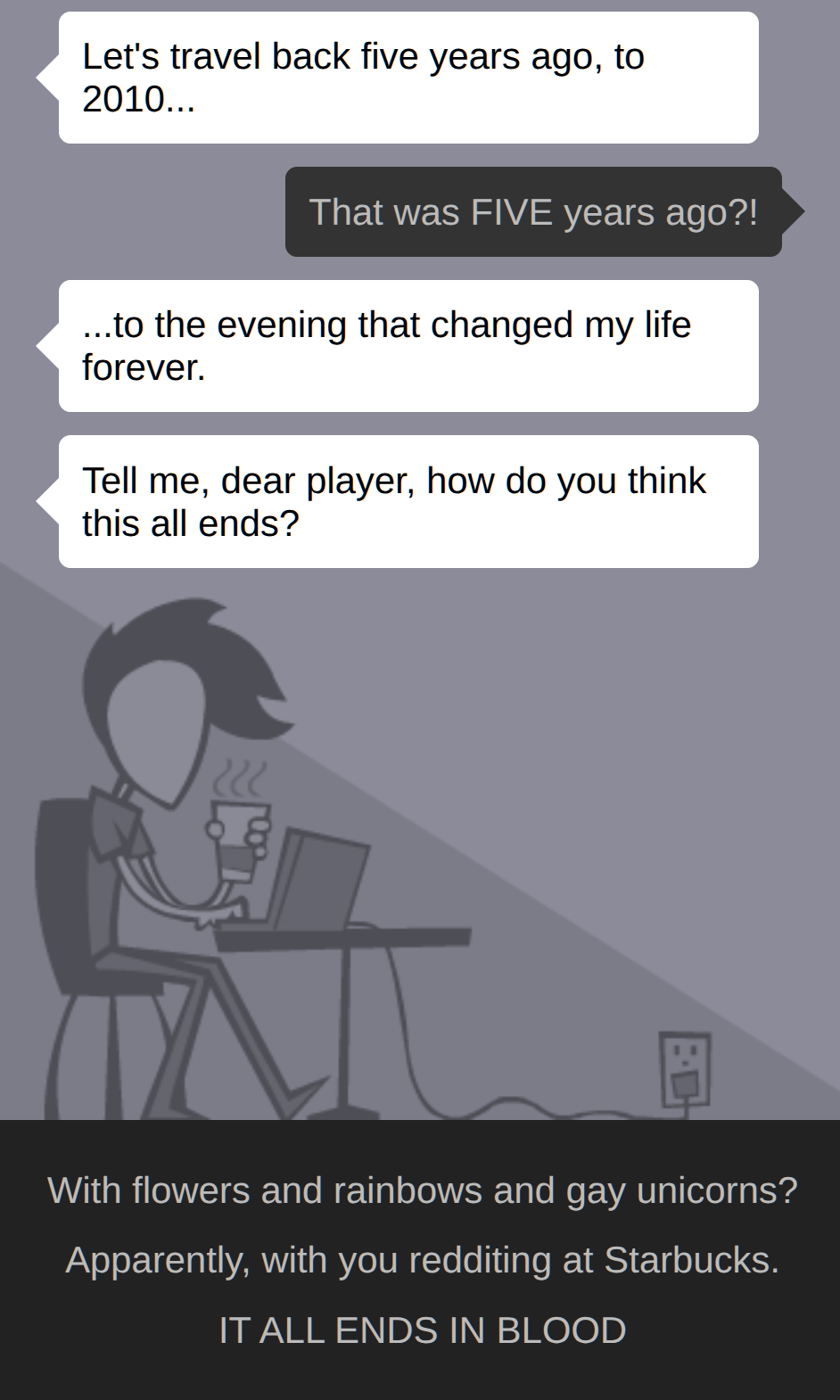
Case narrating to players at the beginning of the game. The player is prompted to select a dialogue option.

Coming Out Simulator is an interactive fiction. Text is presented to players through an interface mimicking the design of a mobile phone, with speech bubbles superimposed on the top of the screen. At certain points in the narrative, players are presented with multiple choice dialogue options, with the choices made in the game influencing the response of the characters. The game is designed so that later responses made by characters will reference previous decisions, for instance: players are asked what choice they made when asked what subject they were studying for earlier in the game. Players have three choices for decision points made throughout the game, with most choices being the truth, a lie, or a half-truth.

== Plot ==
Narrating from a café in the present day, Nicky Case, the game's creator, introduces the game to players, stating that it recounts a set of interactions between Case's parents and ex-boyfriend Jack in 2010. Throughout the game, Case states the narrative includes the truth, half-truths, and lies based on the choices made in the story. They also mention that the names and appearance of people in their life as characters in the game have been altered.

In 2010, Case and Jack exchange text messages in bed, and Jack urges them to come out to their parents that night. At dinner, Case's mother discusses spending time with Jack as their "study partner". She states she is wary of Jack's influence on Case, suspecting Jack is gay and will "recruit" Case into becoming gay, and has arranged to set Case up with a female home tutor, Claire. She reveals that she is aware Case and Jack spend time watching movies instead of studying, as she has read Case's text messages. The conversation spirals out of control as Case's mother confronts Case about their sexuality. If the player reveals that Case is bisexual, she urges him to keep it a secret from Case's father. Upon his arrival, Case's father asks about their day and asks him whether they want to study with Claire or not. If the player disagrees and confronts their father, he punches Case in the face. That night, Case and Jack text about the outcomes of the choices made that day and the future of their relationship.

In the epilogue, Case, again in the present-day café, reveals that they and Jack separated weeks later. Case outlines three different possible aftermaths to the story: a lie, in which Nicky runs away to the North Pole and finds acceptance among a new family of LGBT animals; a half-truth, in which Nicky finds that their tutor Claire is also bisexual and befriends her, sharing their experiences as "bisexual sluts"; and the truth, that they left their family in Canada for an internship with Electronic Arts in the San Francisco Bay Area, building their social network and confidence in their identity. They state that in all branches of the story, including the truth, Case's life got better, and wouldn't have changed a thing, as it motivated them to improve themselves and move on. Case at first says the game is not a game to be won or lost. However, they reflect that they did, in fact, "win" the game in the end. Case farewells players and leaves the café in the arms of a new boyfriend.

== Development ==
Coming Out Simulator was created by Bay Area independent developer Nicky Case. Case created the game for the three-week Nar8 game jam, an event encouraging developers to explore "experimental and interesting" narratives. As a time-limited event, the jam gave them "an excuse and a deadline" to develop a title to work on their narrative and story-writing skills, as well as process the impact of a "traumatic, life-changing event". Case stated the game's "semi-autobiographical" dialogue was influenced by real-life things told to them by their mother, although many personal details presented in the game were "emotionally authentic" but "factually inaccurate". Case cited the Anna Anthropy game Dys4ia, a short Flash game about gender transition, and the choice-based dialog of The Walking Dead series as sources of inspiration for Coming Out Simulator. The game's dialogue was written with the intent of creating a non-linear story, through having branching player choices be reflected in later reactions by characters. As Case progressed development and received feedback, they modified the story to move away from depicting them and their parents as protagonist and antagonist, as well as to distance the game from the objective of coming out, to create greater moral ambiguity and explore the impact of telling the truth or lies. The game was showcased at the 2014 GaymerX conference at San Francisco.

== Reception ==
Several critics considered the game to be a resonant depiction of the impact of coming out. Danielle Riendeau of Polygon stated the game was an "incredible reminder" of the "big, difficult and important" nature of coming out, reinforced by the "terrifying" nature of the game's dialogue options. Yannick LeJacq of Kotaku considered the game to be a "painful" but "necessary" representation of coming out, praising the game for its "intimately personal" and "nakedly vulnerable" nature. Rhuaridh Marr of Metro Weekly said the game provoked a strong "emotional payoff", and they "pondered decisions, raged at his parents’ responses [and] refused to let him be shamed for being him."

Critics also praised the nuance of the game's narrative and dialog choices. Jeffrey Matulef of Eurogamer stated the game's absence of "right, wrong, moral, or immoral" choices of its characters and the ambiguous aspects of which parts form Case's personal story made the game feel authentic. However, Matulef critiqued the game's epilogue for "[taking] away from the player-created fiction" of the truth of how the conflict ended. LeJacq similarly commended the game for not featuring easy answers that could be "solved in a simple clear way", making the choices seem "pressing". Chris Priestman of Kill Screen considered it appropriate that none of the game's endings are presented as preferable, with each "getting across the frustration of the situation". Writing for TakePart, Nicole Pasuka also wrote that the game was an "unusual and ambiguous" representation on coming out, as it "doesn't take for granted that life immediately gets better", and praised the game for displaying a "refreshingly candid" perspective.

=== Academic ===
Coming Out Simulator has received academic commentary. Many reviewers have discussed the game as an example of empathy game or serious game, exploring issues relating to sexuality and mental health. Ritsumeikan University researcher Michitaka Otani writes the game is an example of these issues because it intends that players personally consider a social issue, namely to "experience sexuality and family conflicts", and makes them question their values. Several authors have explored the educational potential of Coming Out Simulator. Bo Ruberg states that the game explores intersectional themes, as Case identifies as queer and a person of color, and these "identities manifest side by side in their work" through depicting the experience of coming out to a family with an Asian migrant background. Mo Sadek of The Artifice says that the game is not a traditional simulation game, but "acts with the purpose of a simulator" as an educational device by providing players with experiences around sexual identification including masculinity and cultural intolerance.

=== Accolades ===
Coming Out Simulator received a nomination for the Excellence in Narrative award category as a finalist at the 2015 Independent Games Festival.
