= Bret Victor =

American interface designer, computer scientist and engineer

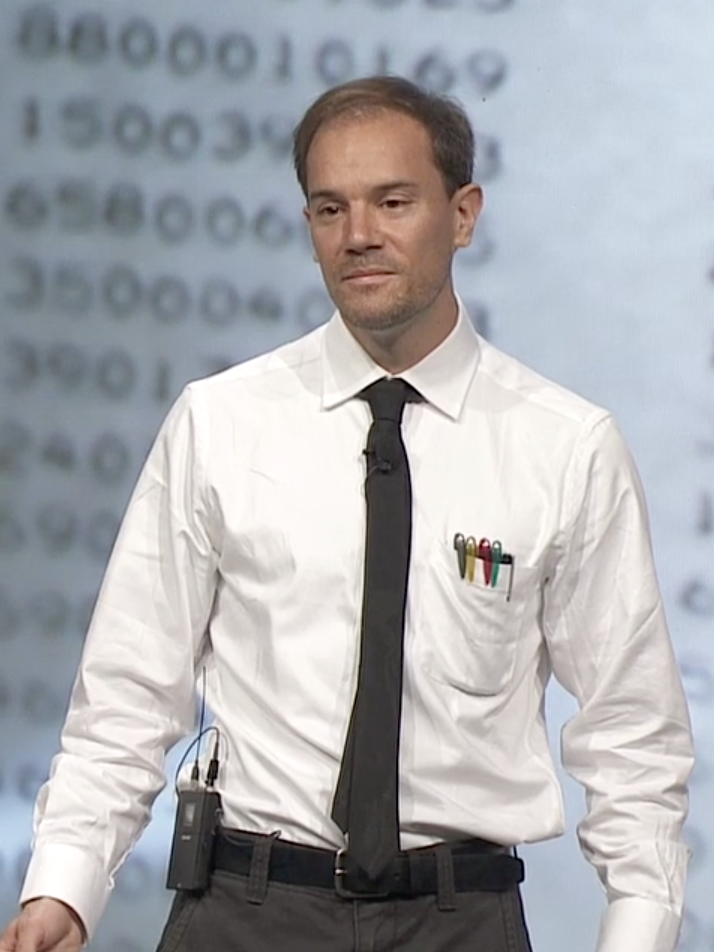
- Victor in 2013
- Education: California Institute of Technology (BS); University of California, Berkeley (MS)
- Scientific career
- Fields: Computer science, human–computer interaction
- Workplaces: Apple, Inc., Communications Design Group, HARC, The Dynamicland Foundation
- Website: worrydream.com

Bret Victor is an American interface designer, computer scientist, and electrical engineer known for his talks on the future of technology. As of 2024, he works as a researcher at Dynamicland.

== Career ==
Bret Victor earned his bachelor's degree in electrical engineering from the California Institute of Technology in 1999. In 2001 he graduated from the University of California, Berkeley, with a master's degree in electrical engineering. After this, he spent time at Alesis, where he developed the Alesis Ion, and its successor the Alesis Micron.

Victor worked as a human interface inventor at Apple Inc. from 2007 until 2011. He was a member of the small group of people who worked on the initial design for the iPad, and contributed to the development of other products including the Apple Watch. In 2014, Victor joined the Communications Design Group as a researcher, where he worked on software to allow citizens and scientists to model and understand systems. As of 2025, he works on dynamic media at Dynamicland, a research lab he founded in Oakland, California.

== Influence ==
Victor received attention for his talks "Inventing on Principle" (2012) and "The Future of Programming" (2013). Some of his work focuses on the evolution of media from print to computers to future technology, which he calls "the dynamic medium". He posits that people use computers as "really fast paper emulators," and envisions future technology that can change its physical form.

A major motivation for Victor's work is to make it easier and faster to use complex tools and ideas. As part of this project he wrote an essay about using interactive models when communicating about science, which popularized the term "explorable explanation".
