= Ivars Peterson =

American mathematics writer (born 1948)

Ivars Peterson (born 4 December 1948) is a Canadian mathematics writer of Latvian descent.

== Early life ==
Peterson was born to Arnis Pētersons (1926-1992) and his wife Zelma Alīde (nee Zosēns) (1923-2012), displaced persons from war-torn Latvia. In 1950, after emigrating to Canada as a child, he settled in McKenzie Island, part of the municipality of Red Lake in northwestern Ontario. In 1956, his family moved to Caribou Falls, and two years later to the city of Kenora and then to Toronto.

Peterson received a B.Sc. in Physics and Chemistry and a B.Ed. in Education from the University of Toronto. Peterson received an M.A. in Journalism from the University of Missouri-Columbia.

== Career ==
Peterson worked as a high school science and mathematics teacher.

Peterson has been a columnist and online editor at Science News and Science News for Kids, and has been columnist for the children's magazine Muse. He wrote the weekly online column Ivars Peterson's MathTrek. Peterson is the author of a number of popular mathematics and related books. Peterson has been a weekly mathematics columnist for MAA Online.

Peterson received the Joint Policy Board for Mathematics Communications Award in 1991 for "exceptional skill in communicating mathematics to the general public over the last decade".

For the spring 2008 semester, he accepted the Wayne G. Basler Chair of Excellence for the Integration of the Arts, Rhetoric and Science at East Tennessee State University. He gave a four lectures on how math is integral in our society and our universe. He also taught a course entitled "Communicating Mathematics".

In 2007, Peterson was named Director of Publications for Journals and Communications at the Mathematical Association of America.

== Bibliography ==
- Mathematical Treks: From Surreal Numbers to Magic Circles (2002) Mathematical Association of America ISBN 0-88385-537-2
- Fragments of Infinity: A Kaleidoscope of Math and Art (2000) John Wiley & Sons ISBN 0-471-16558-1
- The Jungles of Randomness: A Mathematical Safari (1997) John Wiley & Sons ISBN 0-471-16449-6
- Fatal Defect: Chasing Killer Computer Bugs (1995) Times Books ISBN 0-8129-2023-6
- Newton's Clock: Chaos in the Solar System (1993) W.H. Freeman ISBN 0-7167-2724-2
- Islands of Truth: Mathematical Mystery Cruise (1990) W.H.Freeman ISBN 0-7167-2148-1
- The Mathematical Tourist: Snapshots of Modern Mathematics (1988) W.H.Freeman ISBN 0-8050-7159-8
