= George W. Hart =

American geometer (born 1955)

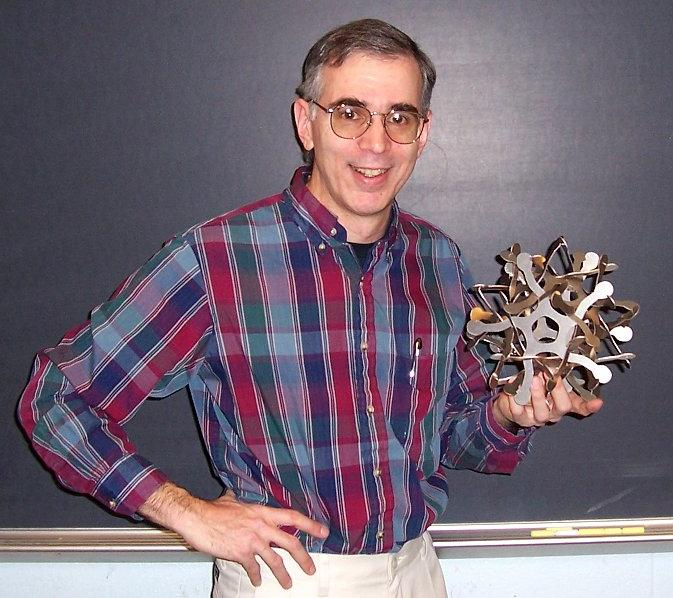
- Geometer George W. Hart with his "12-part sculpture puzzle"
- Born: George William Hart; 1955 (age 70–71)
- Occupation: Geometer
- Children: 3, including Vi
- Scientific career
- Institutions: Columbia University; SUNY Stony Brook
- Thesis: Minimum information estimation of structure (1987)
- Doctoral advisor: Fred C. Schweppe and John N. Tsitsiklis
- Website: www.georgehart.com

George William Hart (born 1955) is an American sculptor and geometer. Before retiring, he was an associate professor of Electrical Engineering at Columbia University in New York City and then an interdepartmental research professor at Stony Brook University. His work includes both academic and artistic approaches to mathematics.

He is the father of mathematics popularizer and YouTuber Vi Hart and a co-founder of MoMath, in New York City.

== Education and career ==
Hart received a B.S. in mathematics from MIT (1977), an M.A. in linguistics from Indiana University (1979), and a Ph.D. in electrical engineering and computer science from MIT (1987).

His academic work includes the online publication Encyclopedia of Polyhedra, the textbook Multidimensional Analysis, and the instruction book Zome Geometry. He has also published over sixty academic articles. His artistic work includes sculpture, computer images, toys (e.g. Zome) and puzzles.

He worked with John H. Conway to promote and standardize the Conway polyhedron notation.

== Sculptures ==
Hart's public sculptures can be seen at locations around the world, including MIT, U.C. Berkeley, Stony Brook University, Princeton University, Duke University, The University of Arizona, Queen's University at Kingston, Macalester College, Pratt Institute, Albion College, Middlesex University, Aalto University, and The Polytechnic University of Valencia.

== Inventions ==
Hart is a coinventor on two US patents, U.S. patent 4,672,555 Digital ac monitor and U.S. patent 4,858,141 Non-intrusive appliance monitor apparatus. These patents cover, in part, an improved electrical meter for homes called nonintrusive load monitors. These meters track changes in voltage and current usage by a given household and then deduce which appliances are using how much electricity and when.

== Museum of Mathematics ==
Hart is a co-founder of North America's only Museum of Mathematics—MoMath in New York City. As chief of content, he set the "Math is Cool!" tone of the museum and spent five years designing original exhibits and workshop activities for it.

== Bibliography ==
- Multidimensional Analysis: Algebras and Systems for Science and Engineering, 1995, ISBN 978-0-387-94417-3
- Zome Geometry - Hands-on Learning with Zome Models, 2001, ISBN 978-1-55953-385-0

== Gallery ==
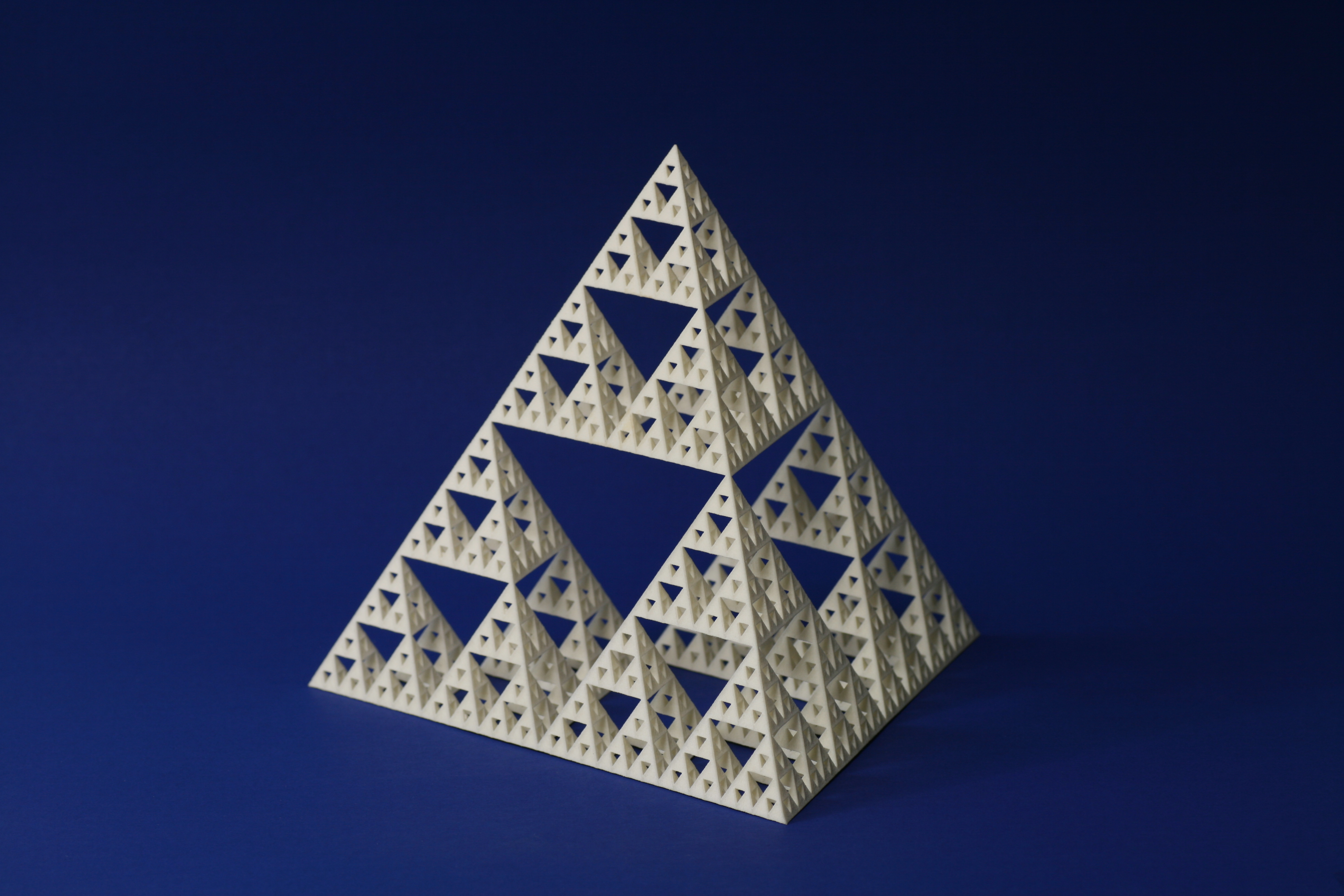
3D print of a Sierpinski tetrahedron, made of nylon (polyamide) by G.W. Hart

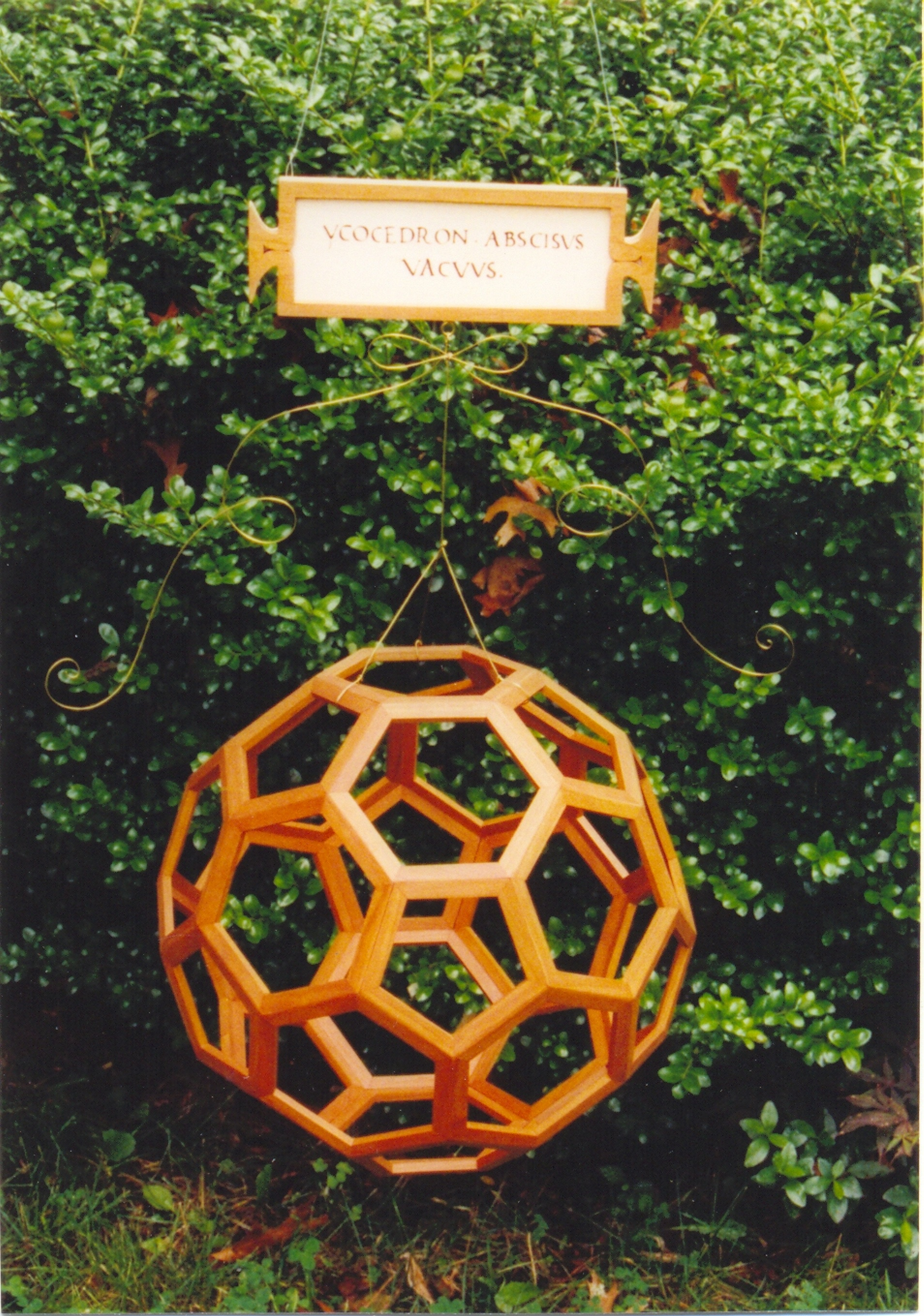
Truncated icosahedron (or soccer ball shape), cherry, about 14 inches in diameter, by G.W. Hart

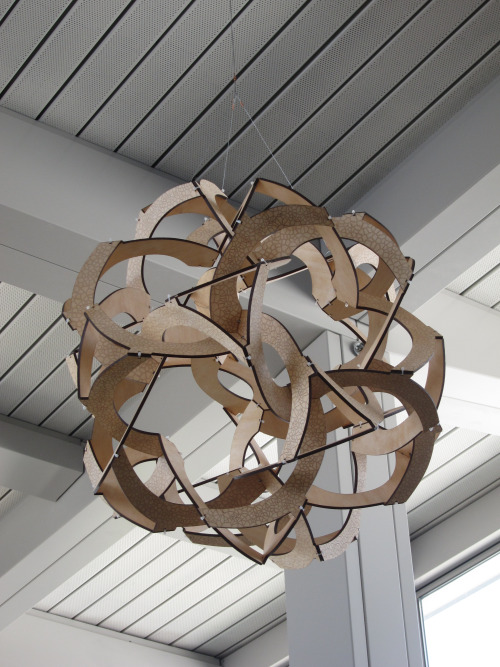
Wooden hanging installation in the Barus-Holley building at Brown University in Providence, Rhode Island.
