= Vi Hart =

American recreational mathematician (born 1988)

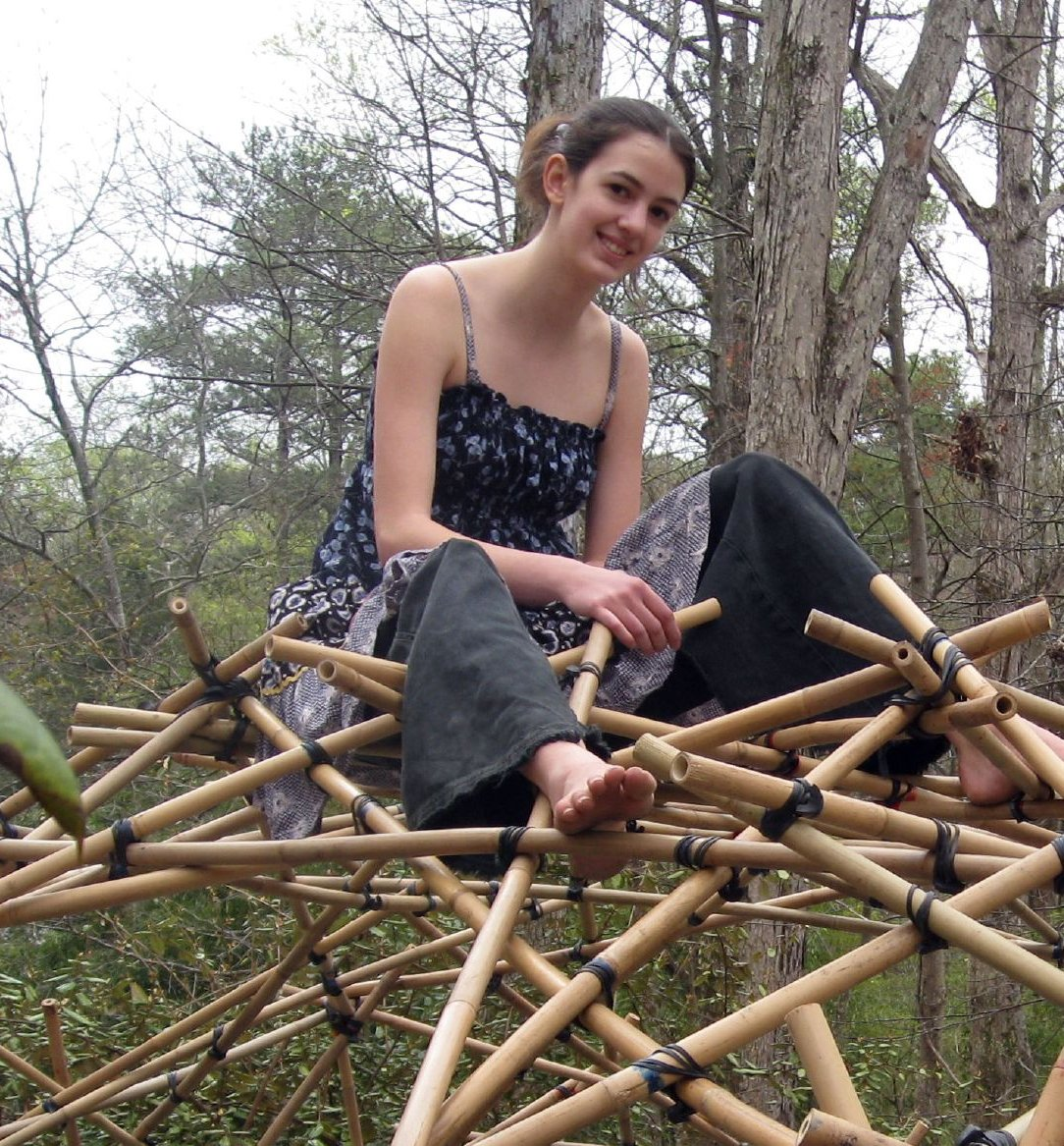
- Hart in 2012, sitting on top of a finished project
- Born: Victoria Hart; 1988 (age 37–38)
- Occupations: YouTube personality; educator; inventor
- Known for: Mathematical/musical YouTube videos

YouTube information
- Channels: Vihart (deleted)
- Years active: 2009–2025
- Genres: Education; music
- Subscribers: 1.46 million
- Views: 154.67 million
- Last updated: 21 April 2025
- Website: vimeo.com/vihart www.patreon.com/vihart

Victoria "Vi" Hart (/ˈvaɪ hɑːrt, ˈviː hɑːrt/ VY hart, VEE hart; born 1988) is an American mathematician and online video creator. They describe themself as a "recreational mathemusician" and are well known for creating mathematical videos on YouTube and popularizing mathematics. Hart founded the virtual reality research group eleVR and has co-authored several research papers on computational geometry and the mathematics of paper folding.

Together with another YouTube mathematics popularizer, Matt Parker, Hart won the 2018 Communications Award of the Joint Policy Board for Mathematics for "entertaining, thought-provoking mathematics and music videos on YouTube that explain mathematical concepts through doodles".

== Career ==
Hart's career as a mathematics popularizer began in 2010 with a video series about "doodling in math class". After these recreational mathematics videos—which introduced topics like fractal dimensions—grew popular, Hart was featured in The New York Times and on National Public Radio, eventually gaining the support of the Khan Academy and making videos for it as its "Resident Mathemusician". Many of Hart's videos combine mathematics and music, such as Twelve Tones, which Salon called "deliriously and delightfully profound".

Together with Henry Segerman, Hart wrote "The Quaternion Group as a Symmetry Group", which was included in the anthology The Best Writing on Mathematics 2015.

In 2014, Hart, M Eilo, and Andrea Hawksley founded the research group eleVR to research virtual reality (VR). The group created VR videos and also collaborated on educational computer games. It created the game Hypernom, where the player has to eat part of 4 dimensional polytopes that are stereographically projected into 3D and viewed with a virtual reality headset. In June, eleVR released an open source web video player that worked with the Oculus Rift. In the same year Hart created the playable blog post Parable of the Polygons with Nicky Case. The game was based on economist Thomas Schelling's Dynamic Models of Segregation. In May 2016, eleVR joined Y Combinator Research (YCR) as part of the Human Advancement Research Community (HARC) project, in which Hart was listed as a Principal Investigator.

Hart was a Senior Research Project Manager and a Director of Policy and Strategy in the Societal Resilience Group at Microsoft. Hart left Microsoft and the technology industry in 2022.

Hart deleted their YouTube channel and videos in 2025. A statement on their Patreon page said they were unhappy with YouTube's terms of service and treatment of creators. Hart indicated they did not plan to return to YouTube but that their videos would remain available on Vimeo. At the time of deletion the channel had approximately 1.5 million subscribers.

== Personal life ==
Hart is the child of mathematical sculptor George W. Hart, and received a degree in music at Stony Brook University.

Hart identifies as "gender agnostic"; in a video released in 2015, they spoke about their lack of gender identity—including lacking non-binary identities such as agender—and their attitude to gendered terms such as pronouns has evolved over time; as a teenager, they thought people who stated their gender were being "pretentious", but now they understand the importance to others (especially trans and genderqueer individuals) of how other people identify, even though they have no preference as to which pronouns they are called.
