= 2014 in public domain =

This is a list of works that entered the public domain in part of the world in 2014 in the following Post mortem auctoris countries and regions.

== Entering the public domain in Europe ==
A work enters the public domain in most European countries (with the exception of Belarus) 70 years after the creator's death, if it was published during the author's lifetime.

=== Writers ===
The section of Stephen Hero (James Joyce) added in 1963 will enter the UK public domain.

- A. Merritt, an American Sunday magazine editor and writer of speculative fiction.
- Akim Samar, a Soviet poet and novelist and the first Nanai-language writer.
- Alberto Casañal Shakery, a Spanish poet, writer, humourist and novelist.
- Alessandro Maragliano, an Italian poet, journalist and painter.
- Alfred Deutsch-German, an Austrian poet, journalist, screenwriter and film director.
- Alice Rühle-Gerstel, a German journalist and activist.
- Andreas Latzko, an Austrian novelist, playwright and biographer.
- Annie Shepherd Swan, a Scottish journalist and writer of romantic fiction.
- Edward Heron-Allen, an English journalist and translator.
- Edward Abbott Parry, an English playwright and children's author.
- Eduardo Martínez Celis, a Mexican journalist, poet, essayist and playwright.
- E. M. Delafield, an English author best known for Diary of a Provincial Lady.
- Denji Kuroshima, a Japanese anti-militarist novelist.
- David Vygodsky, a Russian translator, poet and literary critic.
- Dan Billany, a British novelist of World War II. Note that The Cage and The Trap were published posthumously, and therefore will not enter the public domain in 2014.
- Cale Young Rice, an American poet and dramatist.
- Bernt Theodor Anker, a Norwegian author.
- Beatrix Potter, an author and illustrator best known for The Tale of Peter Rabbit.
- Beatrice Webb, an English socialist author.
- Beatrice Hastings, an English writer, poet and literary critic.
- Arthur Waugh, an English biographer, poet and father of Alec and Evelyn Waugh.
- Gertrud Kolmar, a German poet.
- George Bramwell Evens, a British writer on natural history and the countryside.
- Froylán Turcios, a Honduran intellectual.
- Frida Uhl, an Austrian writer.
- Fredrik Ramm, a Norwegian journalist.
- Frederick Franklin Schrader, an American journalist and dramatist.
- Ernst Ottwalt, a German writer and dramatist.
- Enrique Geenzier, a Panamanian poet.
- Emily Poynton Weaver, a Canadian novelist and essayist.
- Else Ury, a German, Jewish children's book author.
- Elinor Glyn, a British script writer and author of romantic fiction.
- Georg Hermann, a German, Jewish writer, art historian.
- Hanns Heinz Ewers, a German writer, Enfant terrible and Nobel prize winner.
- Karl Federn, a German writer, his Book "Hauptmann Latour" was forbidden by the Nazi Regime.
- Kurt Eggers, a German writer, poet, songwriter and playwright.
- Kočo Racin, a Macedonian poet.
- Kermit Roosevelt, an American memoirist and the son of Theodore Roosevelt.
- Karl Schönherr, an Austrian writer on Heimat.
- Jenő Rejtő, a Hungarian journalist and writer.
- Jovan Dučić, a Bosnian Serb writer and poet.
- José Gil Fortoul, a Venezuelan historian and writer.
- Joseph Clayton, an English journalist, historian and biographer.
- Joseph Anton Schneiderfranken, a German/Swiss philosopher and painter.
- Jiří Langer, a Hebrew poet, scholar and essayist.
- James Cowan, a New Zealand author on ethnography and colonial history.
- Ivan Goran Kovačić, a Croatian poet and writer.
- Ignacio Lasso, an Ecuadorian poet.
- Hyun Jin-geon, a South Korean writer.
- Hermogenes Ilagan, a Filipino writer and playwright.
- Henrik Pontoppidan, a Danish realist writer and Nobel Laureate.
- Gjuro Szabo, a Croatian historian.
- Roger Gilbert-Lecomte, a French avant-garde poet.
- Robert Lively, an American screenwriter.
- Richard Hillary, a British pilot who wrote about The Battle of Britain.
- Raisa Blokh, a Russian poet.
- Radclyffe Hall, an English poet and author best known for The Well of Loneliness.
- Poykayil Johannan, a Dalit poet.
- Pierre-Barthélemy Gheusi, a French journalist and writer.
- Per Imerslund, a Norwegian national socialist and autobiographer.
- Nordahl Grieg, a Norwegian socialist poet, dramatist, novelist and journalist.
- Nankichi Niimi, a Japanese author of children's fiction.
- Maurice Healy, an Irish writer best known for his legal memoirs.
- Maria Jotuni, a Finnish author and playwright.
- Mankumari Basu, an Indian poet and short story writer.
- M. M. Mangasarian, an American writer best known for discussion of the historical Jesus.
- Louis Gillet, a French art and literature historian.
- Lorenz Hart, a lyricist who wrote songs like "Blue Moon" and "My Funny Valentine"
- Lore Berger, a Swiss novelist.
- Levon Pashalian, an Armenian short story writer, journalist and novelist.
- Zygmunt Rumel, a Polish poet.
- Yusif Vazir Chamanzaminli, an Azerbaijani essayist and novelist.
- Yury Tynyanov, a Soviet writer and screenwriter.
- William Charles Scully, a South African poet and novelist.
- Willem Arondeus, a Dutch artist and novelist.
- Wallace Nelson, an Australian essayist.
- W. W. Jacobs, an English novelist and short story writer best known for The Monkey's Paw
- Veselin Masleša, a Bosnian Serb writer.
- Vaman Malhar Joshi, an Indian writer.
- Tsugi Takano, a Japanese novelist.
- Tripuraneni Ramaswamy, an Indian playwright.
- Thoma Abrami, an Albanian poet and journalist.
- Theo Thijssen, a Dutch writer.
- Stephen Vincent Benét, an American poet, novelist and short story writer best known for John Brown's Body
- Stephen Haggard, a British writer and poet.
- Simone Weil, a French philosopher who wrote a plan for post-World War II France.
- Shūsei Tokuda, a Japanese author.
- Shaul Tchernichovsky, a Russian-born Hebrew poet.
- Sarah Grand, a British feminist writer.
- S. E. Cottam, an English poet.
- Rudolf Lothar, an Austrian writer and essayist.
- Kostis Palamas, a Greek poet.
- Pieter Cornelis Boutens, Dutch poet, mystic and classicist.

=== Artists ===
- Beatrix Potter - illustrated her classic children's books
- William M. Timlin, a South African illustrator.
- Gustav Vigeland, Norwegian sculptor.
- Henri Martin, French painter.
- Camille Claudel, French sculptor.
- Maurice Denis, French painter.
- Chaïm Soutine, French expressionist painter.
- Sophie Taeuber-Arp, Swiss artist and sculptor.
- Robert Antoine Pinchon, French Post-Impressionist landscape painter.
- Jovan Dučić, Bosnian Serb poet and writer.
- Oskar Schlemmer, German poet and sculptor.
- Carmen Zaragoza y Rojas, Filipino painter
- Anna Alma-Tadema
- Franz Courtens
- Aristarkh Lentulov
- John R. Neill, American magazine and children's book illustrator
- Nils von Dardel
- Sarah Purser Irish
- Alain John
- Dionisio Baixeras Verdaguer
- Edmond Delphaut
- Ella Du Cane
- Emil Mazy
- Ella Sophonisba Hergesheimer
- Emanuel Bachrach-Barée

=== Composers and musicians ===
- Fats Waller, American jazz musician and entertainer.
- Geoffrey Shaw, English composer and musician.

According to the Logos Foundation, works by these composers published during their lifetimes are in the public domain.

- Joseph Schillinger
- Sergei Rachmaninov
- Wouter Hutschenruijter (1859-1943)
- Leo Smit
- Charles N. Daniels
- Lorenzo Barcelata

=== Academics ===
- Max Wertheimer
- Franz Oppenheimer, German-Jewish sociologist and political economist.

=== Other ===
- Nikola Tesla
- George Washington Carver, American scientist and inventor.
- Max Reinhardt, American actor and director.
- John Harvey Kellogg
- Johannes Hähle, German World War II photographer.

== Brazil ==
- Afrânio de Melo Franco

== Entering the public domain in the United States ==
The Copyright Term Extension Act means no published works would enter the public domain in this jurisdiction until 2019. Unpublished and unregistered works by authors who died in 1943 entered the public domain on January 1, 2014.

== Entering the public domain in 50 years post mortem auctoris countries ==
In countries where works enter the public domain 50 years after the death of the creator (such as Canada) the following authors' works will be in the public domain in 2014.

- Stark Young, American playwright, novelist and essayist.
- Gustav Regler, German socialist novelist.
- Gilardo Gilardi, Argentine composer.
- Józef Gosławski, Polish sculptor and medallic artist.
- Otto Harbach, American lyricist and librettist.
- Robert Frost, American poet.
- Sylvia Plath, American poet, novelist and short story writer.
- Arthur Guy Empey, American author and screenwriter.
- Herbert Asbury, American journalist and writer.
- William Carlos Williams, American modernist poet.
- Jean Bruce, French popular writer.
- Xul Solar, Spanish sculptor, painter, writer and inventor of imaginary languages.
- Kodō Nomura, Japanese novelist and movie critic.
- Christopher Hassall, English actor, librettist, lyricist and poet.
- Roland Pertwee, English playwright and screenwriter.
- Lope K. Santos, Filipino Tagalog writer.
- Nâzım Hikmet Ran, Turkish poet, playwright, novelist and memoirist.
- John Cowper Powys, British novelist.
- Theodore Roethke, American poet.
- Oliver La Farge, American writer.
- Clifford Odets, American playwright and screenwriter.
- Georges Braque, French Cubist sculptor and painter.
- David Low, New Zealand political cartoonist who worked in the UK.
- Louis MacNeice, Irish poet and playwright.
- Suzanne Duchamp, French Dadaist painter.
- Jean Cocteau, French poet, novelist, playwright and artist.
- C. S. Lewis, Irish novelist, poet and essayist.
- Aldous Huxley, English novelist and essayist.
- Tristan Tzara, Romanian and French essayist and poet.
- Edith Hamilton, American educator and author

== Entering the public domain in 20 years p.m.a. countries ==
In countries where works enter the public domain 20 years after the death of the creator (such as Libya) the following authors' works will be in the public domain in 2014.

- Charizma, American hip hop artist.
- Léo Ferré, French poet and composer.
- William Golding, English poet, novelist and playwright best known for Lord of the Flies.

== Worldwide ==
Jason Rohrer declared that his videogame The Castle Doctrine will enter the public domain.

Nicky Case donated her videogames Coming Out Simulator 2014 and Parable of the Polygons to the public domain.

== See also ==
- 1943 in literature, 1953 in literature, 1963 in literature and 1973 in literature
- List of countries' copyright lengths
- Public Domain Day
- Creative Commons
- Public Domain
- Over 300 public domain authors available in Wikisource (any language), with descriptions from Wikidata
