= Mazy (surname) =

Mazy is a surname. Notable people with the surname include:

- Emil Mazy (1865–1943), American artist
- Leon Mazy (1860–1938), Belgian artist

== See also ==
- Mazey
