= Ella Du Cane =

British artist

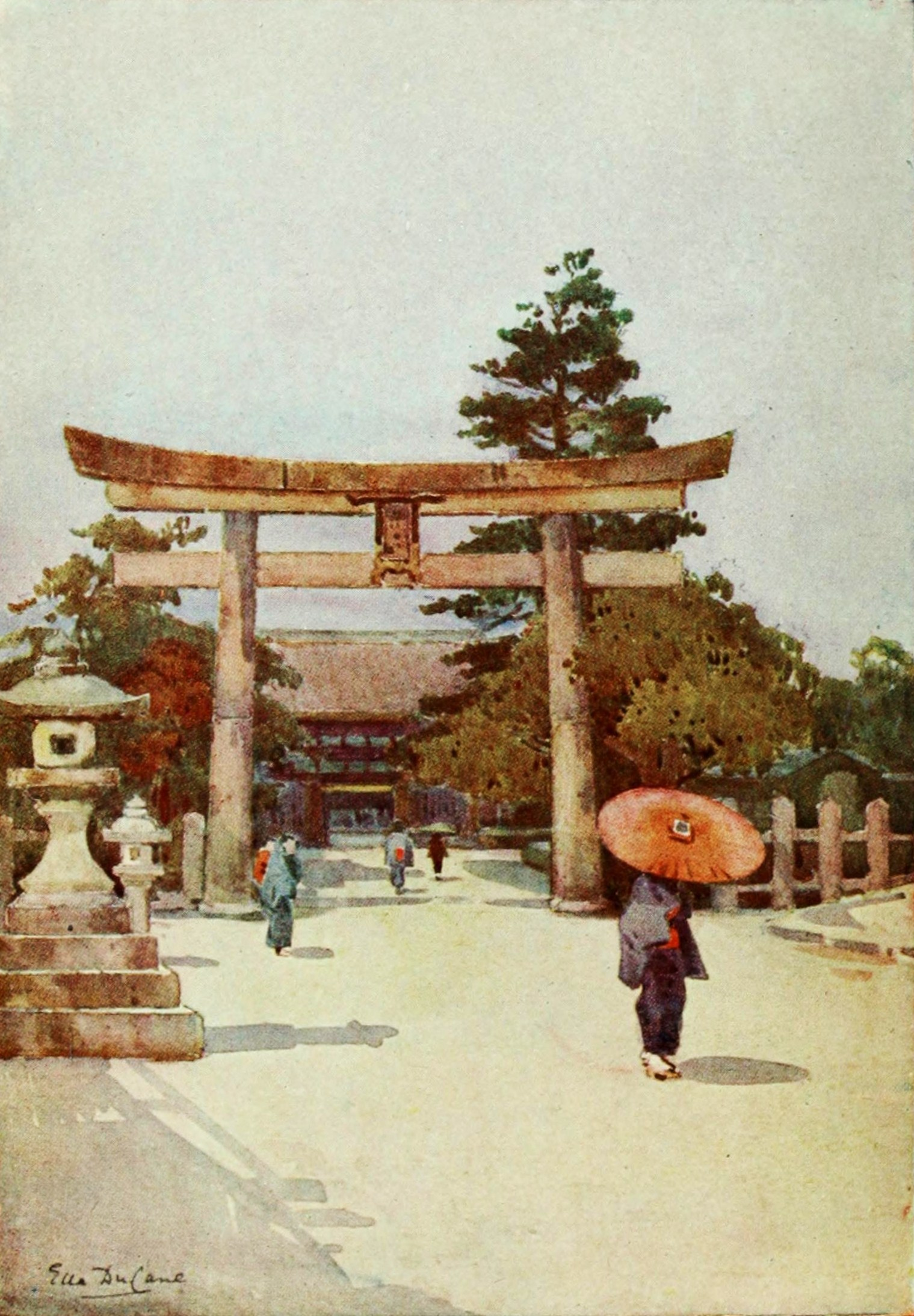
Illustration of Japan.

Ella Du Cane (1874-1943) was a British artist best known for her watercolors of landscapes and exotic locales.

== Early life ==
Ella Mary Du Cane was the third and youngest daughter of politician and colonial administrator Sir Charles Du Cane and his wife, Georgiana Susan Copley. Through her mother, she was the great-granddaughter of the artist, John Singleton Copley. She was born in Hobart, Tasmania in the last year of her father's five-year term as Governor of Tasmania, shortly before the family returned to their country house at Braxted Park, Essex. In Essex, Charles was made a Knight Commander of the Order of St Michael and St George and served as Chairman of the Board of Customs.

Her sister Florence was born in 1869. Ella made watercolor paintings and Florence was a writer. After their father died in 1889 they decided that they would travel the world unchaperoned. They visited China, Japan, Egypt, the Canary Islands and Madeira.

== Career ==
Ella Du Cane came into artistic prominence in 1893 when she exhibited at an exhibition of the prestigious New Society of Painters in Water Colours. Queen Victoria took a personal interest in her work, acquiring 26 of Du Cane's works between December 1895 and August 1898.

With success came opportunities for travel. A 1902 exhibition of water color drawings of the West Indies was followed in 1904 by a show of pictures of Japan. In 1905 Du Cane was hired by A & C Black to provide illustrations for The Italian Lakes (1905), with descriptions by Richard Bagot. The company also used several of her Japan pictures in a book by John Finnemore. Building on her success, Du Cane arranged with Black to do a book on Japanese gardens with text written by her sister, Florence, a book released in 1908 as The Flowers and Gardens of Japan. The following year, the sisters' second book, The Flowers and Gardens of Madeira appeared.

In later years, Ella continued to travel and paint, and never married. She continued to live with her mother and sister in Essex, the family moving to an estate called Mountains, on a hillside site near Maldon, after selling Braxted Park in 1919. Ella Du Cane died of unknown causes on 25 November 1943 at Mountains. She is buried with her sisters at All Saints Church, Great Braxted.

== Works ==
The Flowers and Gardens of Japan

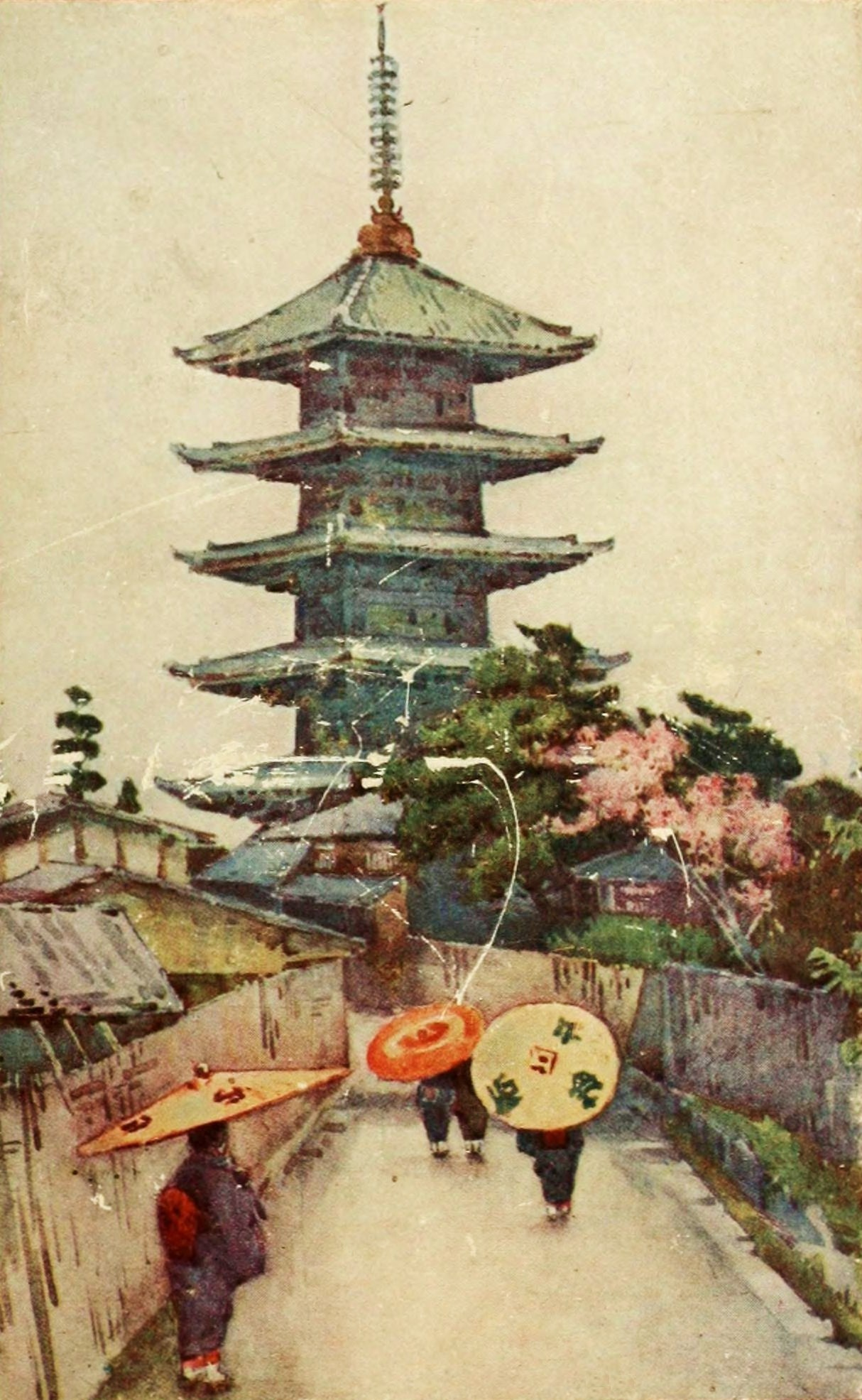

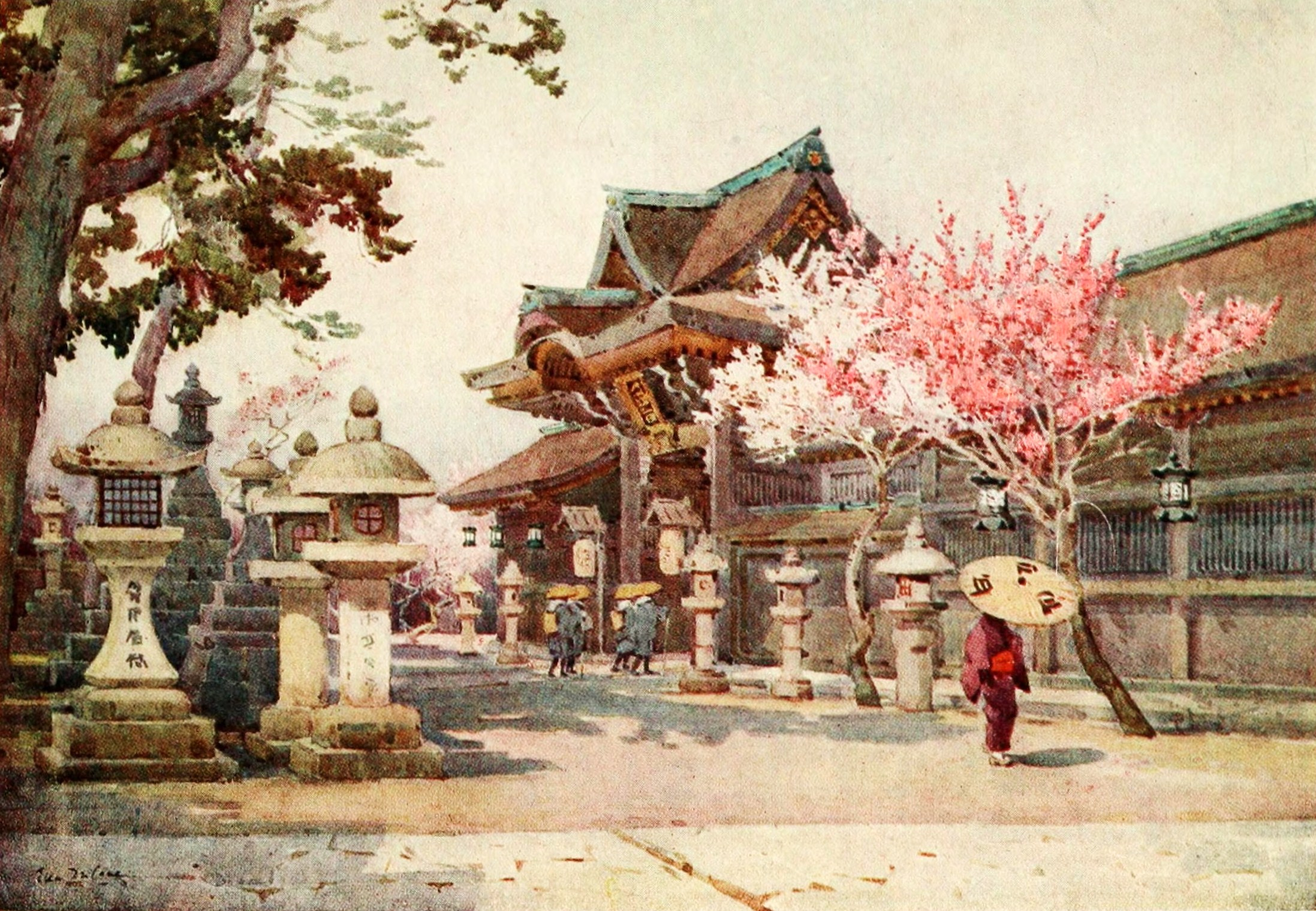

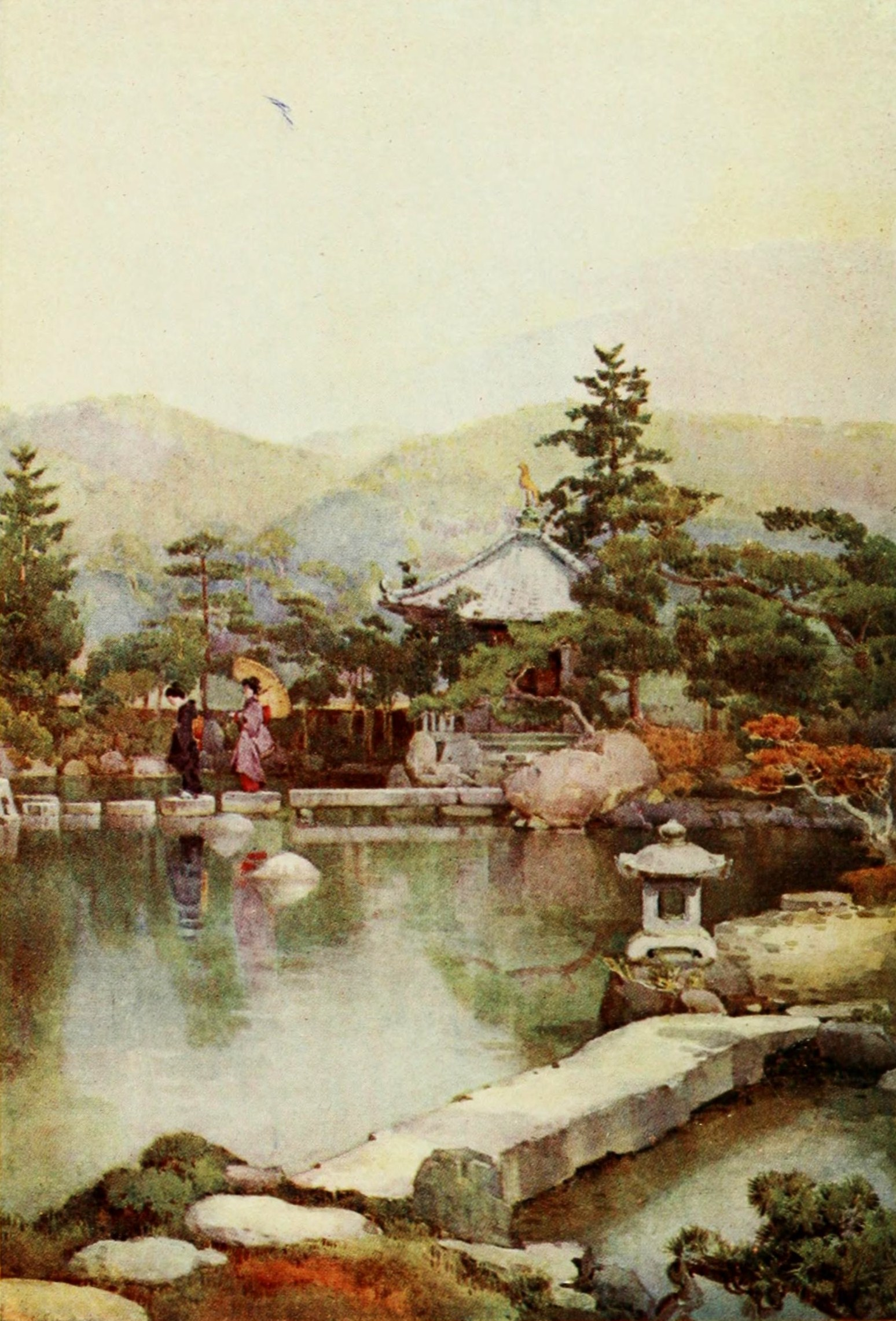

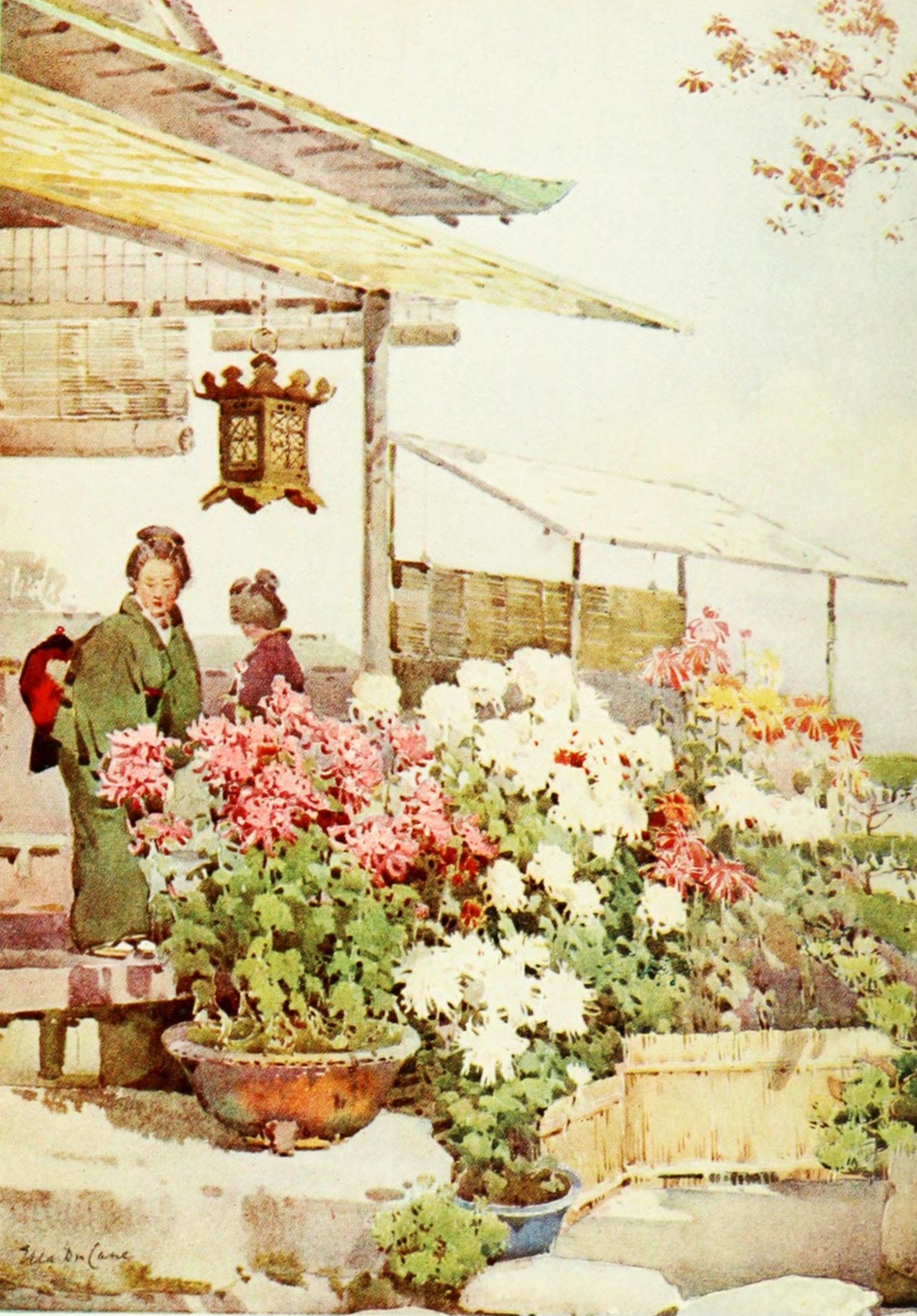
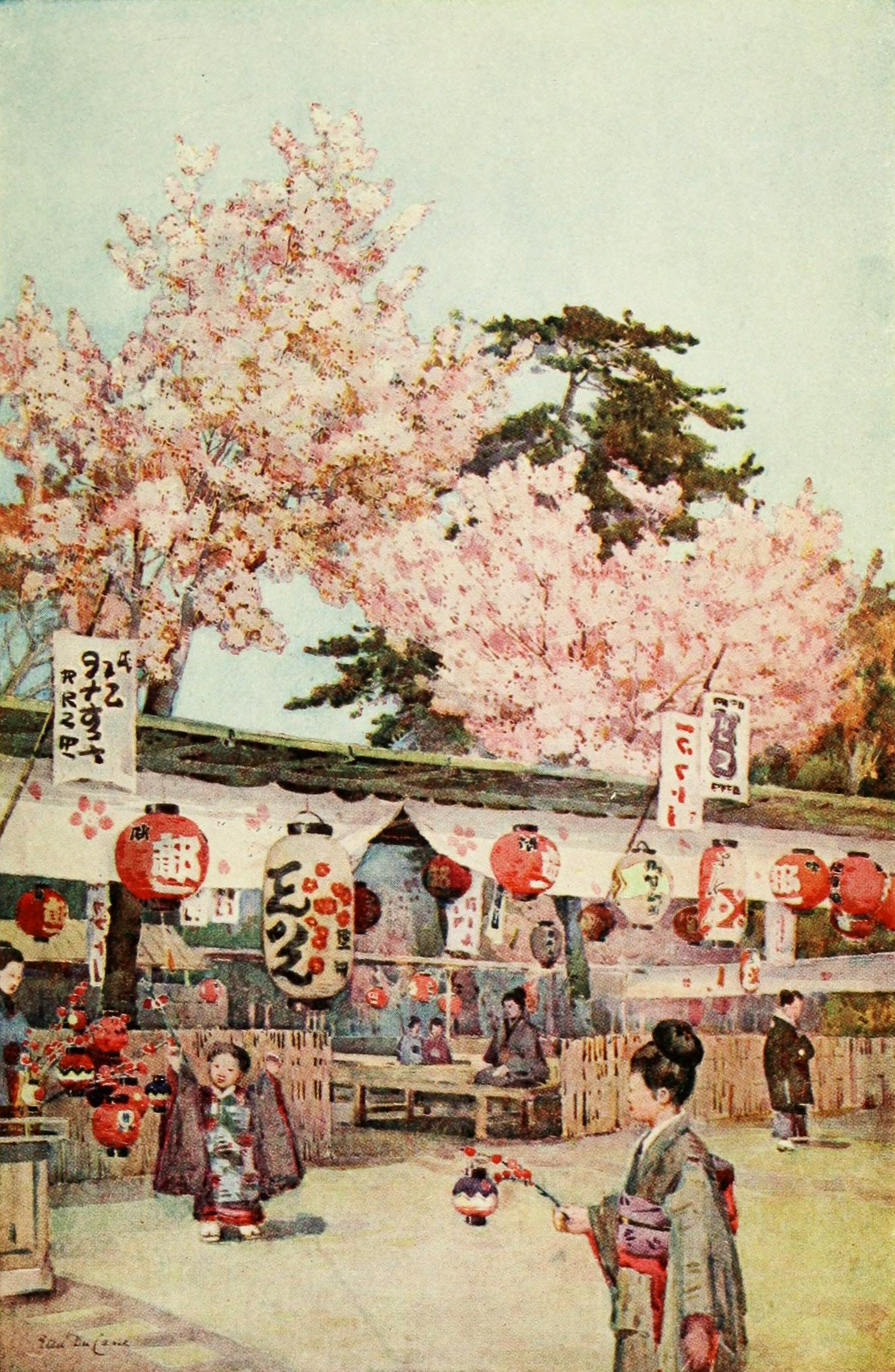

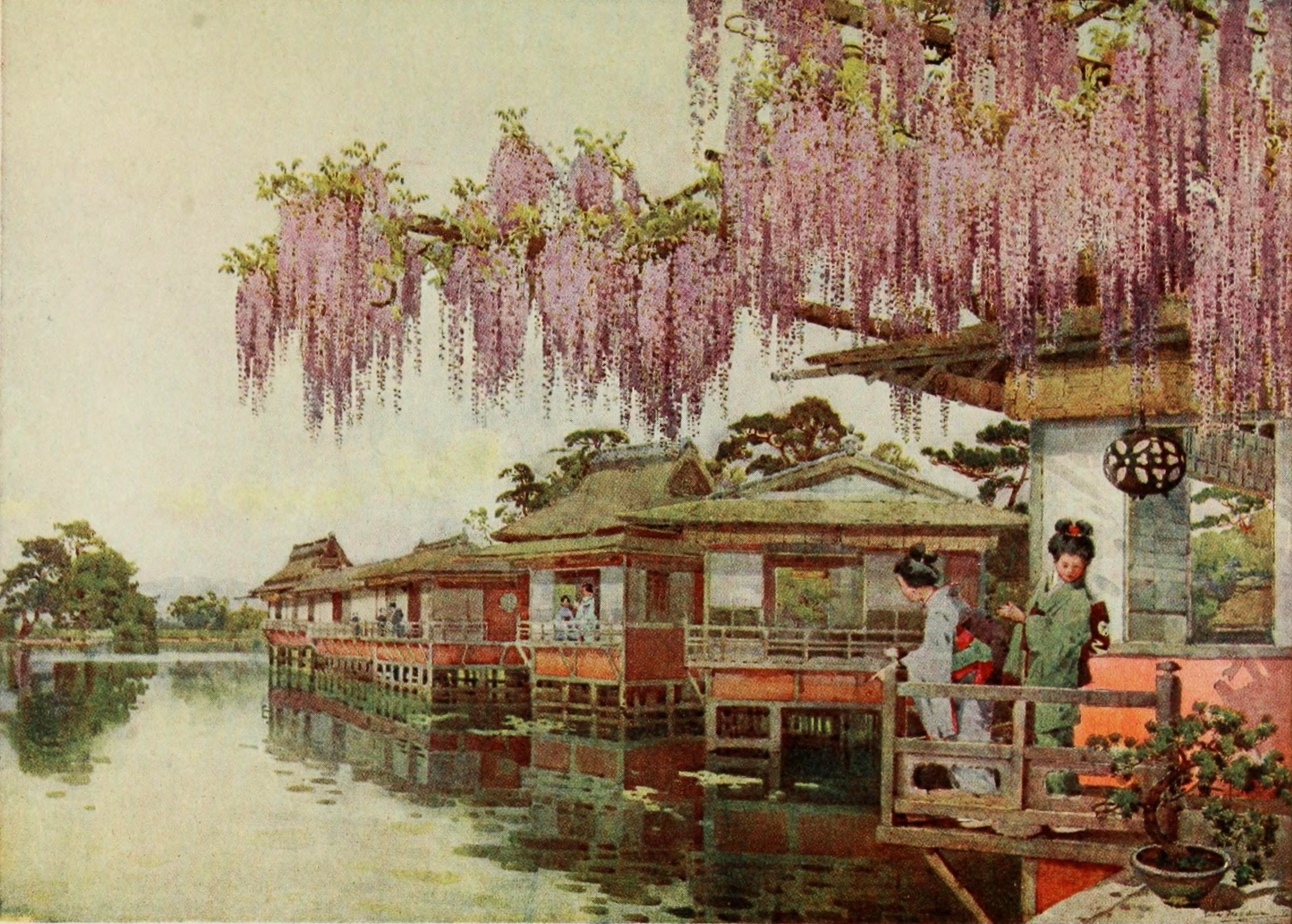

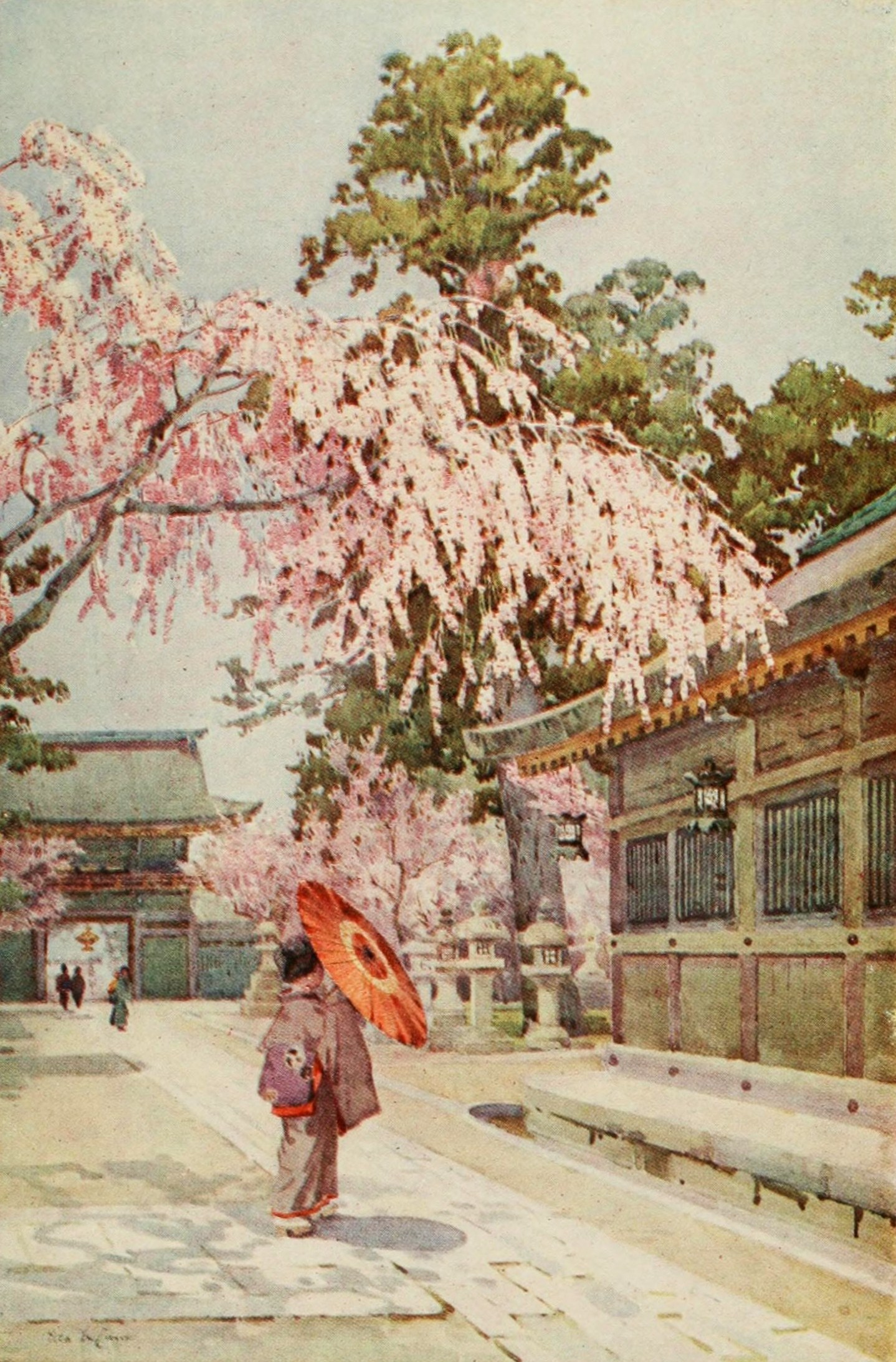

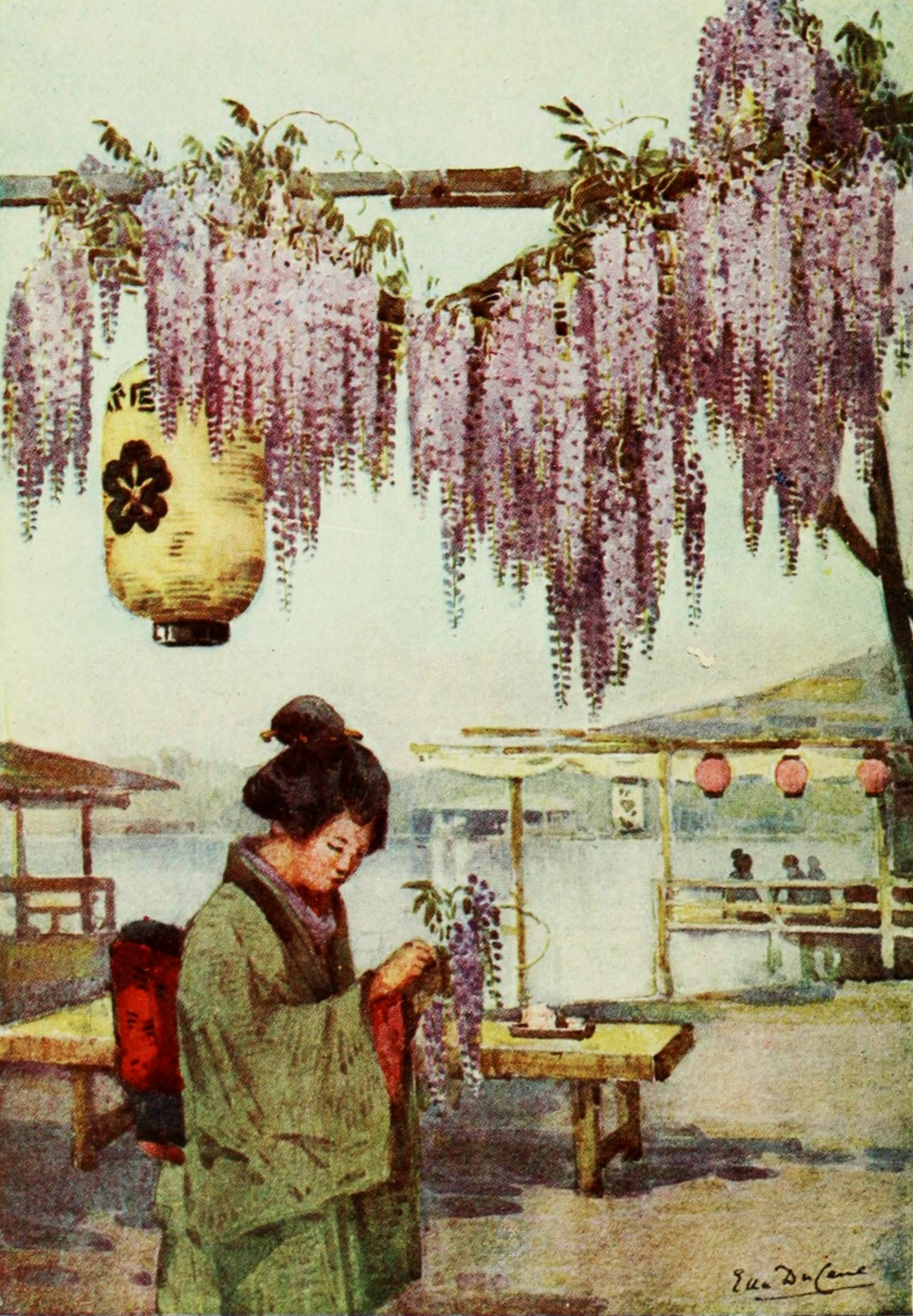
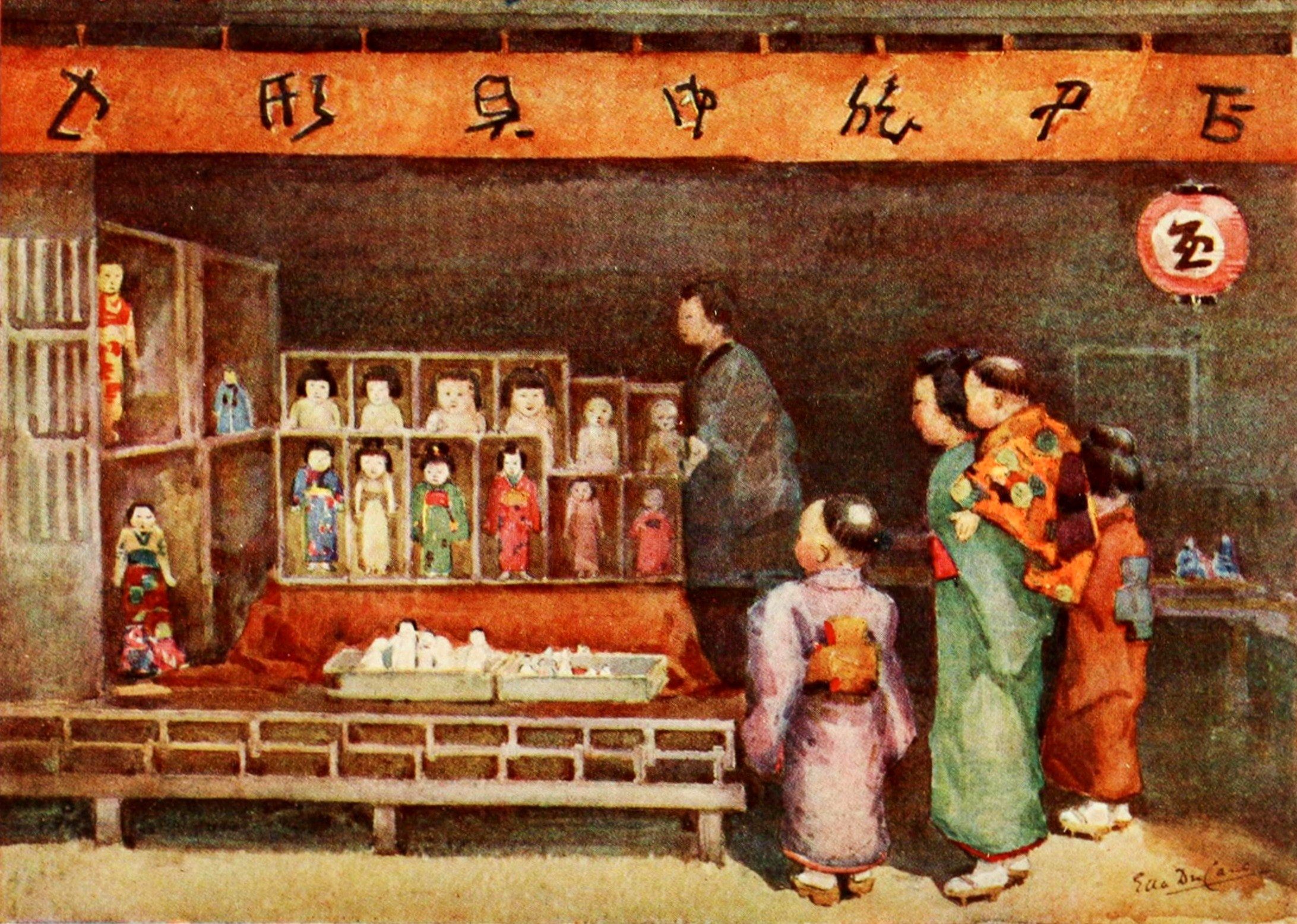

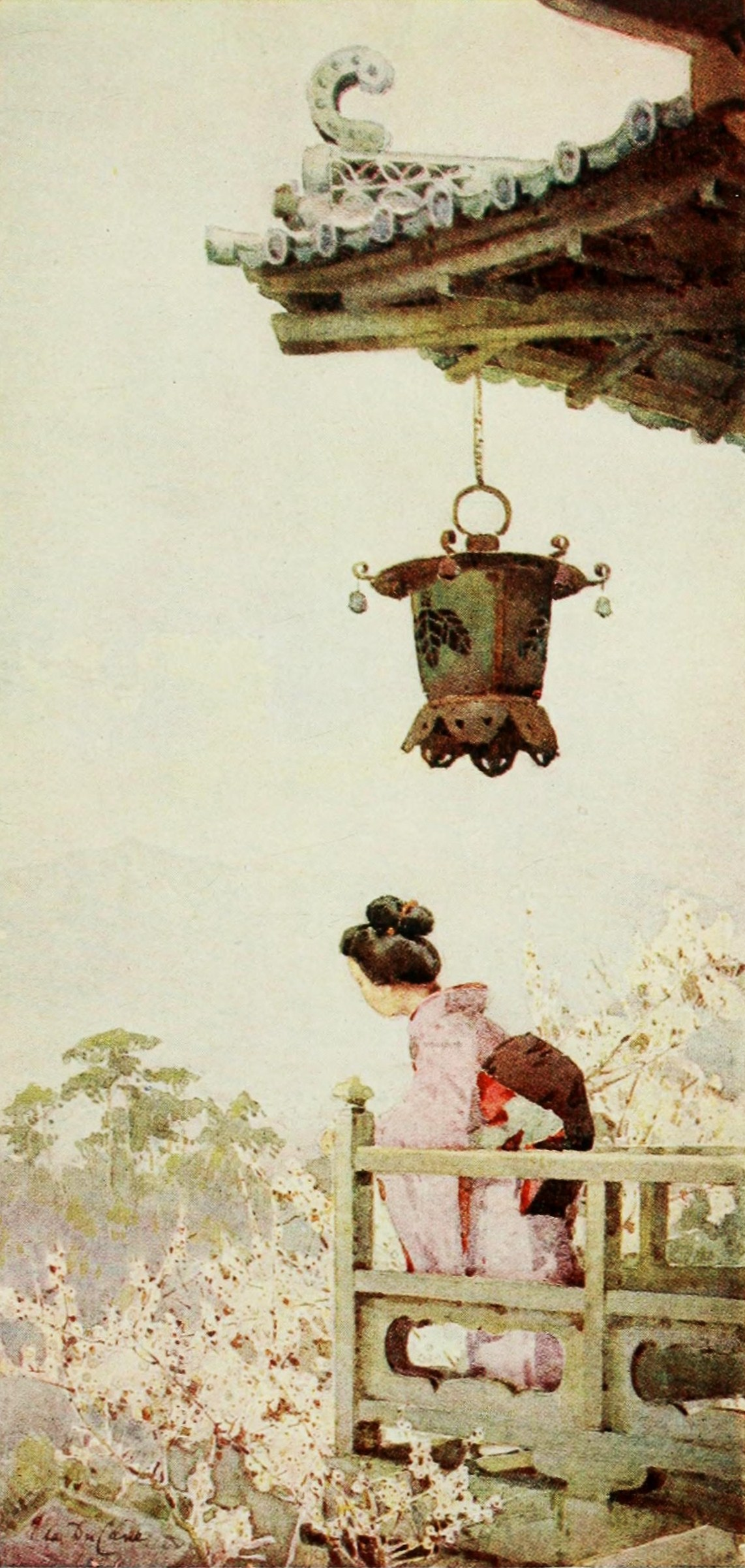

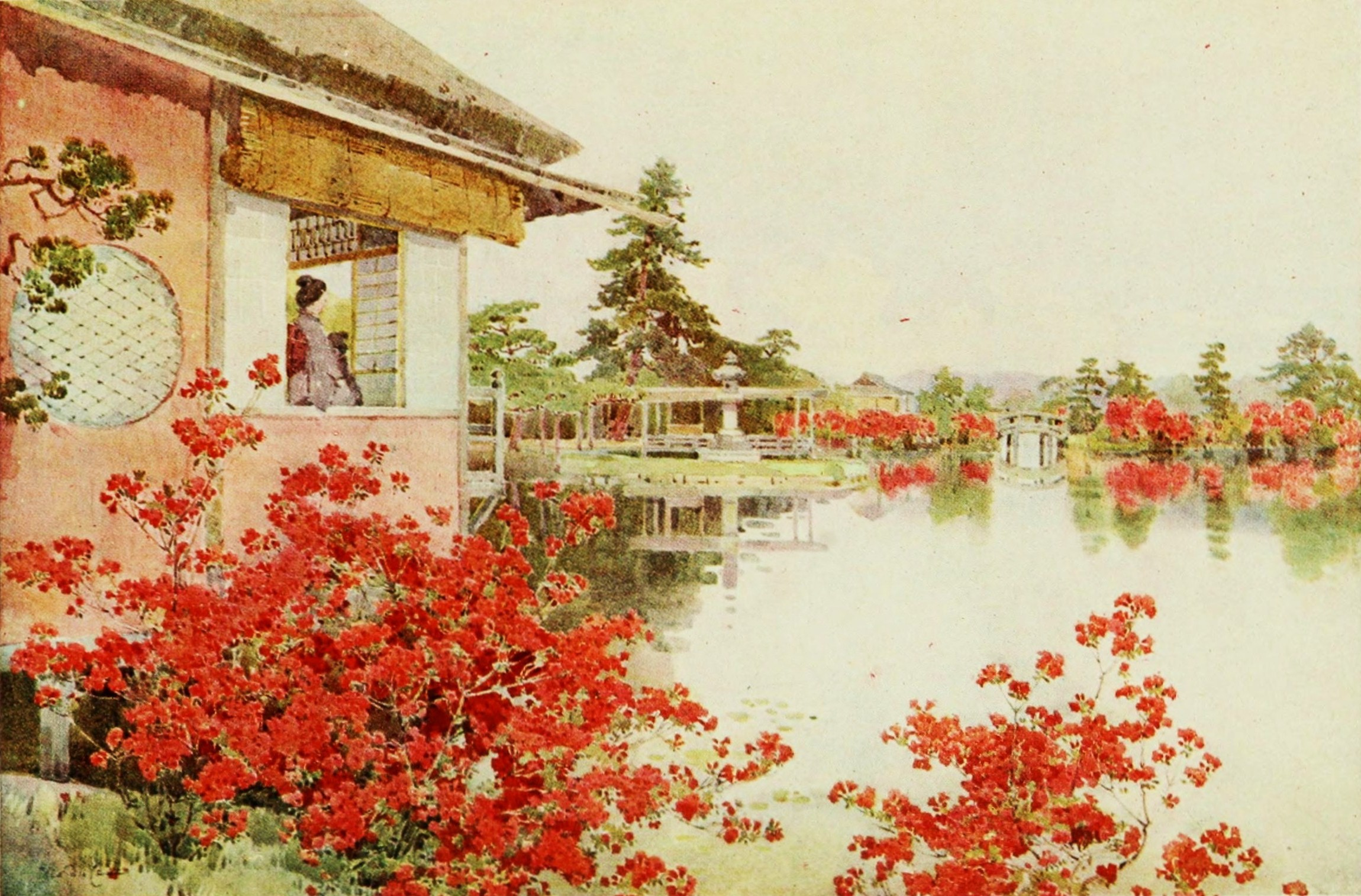
