= Alessandro Maragliano =

Italian writer (1850–1943)

Alessandro Maragliano (1850–1943) was a writer, linguist and poet.

Better known by his fellow citizens as Lissandren dra Russela, which in the local Lombard vernacular translates as 'little Alexander of the Russela', the name 'Russela' referring to the area where he lived, named after the Rosselli brothers, and known to the locals as 'Piasa Russela', or Rosselli Brothers' Square.

Born under the Lombardo-Venetian Kingdom, he became Italian in 1861, with the establishment of the Kingdom of Italy. Throughout his life, Maragliano dedicated himself to the development of local culture. He often organised cultural events which had the local youth as their focal point and were attended by radical intellectuals of the time.

His poetry, written in the local Lombard vernacular, reflected the socio-political issues of his native town and the neighbouring areas.

He worked as a journalist and writer and had a strong passion for painting. Among his works are: Biografie e Profili Vogheresi, Sestine e Sonetti in Dialetto Vogherese, and the Dizionario Vogherese-Italiano.
