= Emily Poynton Weaver =

Canadian writer

Emily Poynton Weaver (1865–1943) was a Canadian writer and historian. She was born in England and went to Canada with her parents in 1880. She contributed short stories and historical essays to magazines in British and American periodicals and published several full-length novels.

== Biography ==
Weaver was born in Greater Manchester, England in 1865 to Richard Thomas Weaver and Elizabeth Dutton Smith. She attended private schools in England and came to Canada with her family at age 15. Initially the family lived on a farm near Waterloo, Ontario and it was here that she was inspired to start writing. The family eventually relocated to Toronto where the children could receive a better education. She lived in Toronto but spent a brief period in Halifax, Nova Scotia. She supported herself primarily through journalism and worked as a writer and editor for the Toronto Globe (precursor to The Globe and Mail). She began to submit short stories and articles to magazines which were published. She wrote over a dozen works of fiction, histories, and textbooks. Several of her books were published through religious organizations and her novels reflect a high moral tone. Her first novel, My Lady Nell, published in 1890, won a prize from the Congregationalist Society of Boston. She wrote a textbook in 1900, A Canadian History for Boys and Girls which was adopted for use in schools in the provinces of Quebec, Nova Scotia, and New Brunswick.

Weaver lived in Toronto with two of her sisters, Anne Elizabeth Weaver and Ethel Chambers Weaver. Both were involved in writing and editing. Anne Elizabeth was also an illustrator and collaborated with Emily on some of her books. Weaver died in Toronto after a long illness in 1943.

== Works ==
=== Fiction ===
- My Lady Nell (1890) Historical romance of the Jacobean era.
- The Rabbi's Sons: A Story of the Days of St. Paul (1891) Historical romance of the Biblical era.
- Soldiers of Liberty: A Story of Wars in the Netherlands (1892) Set during the Eighty Years' War.
- Prince Rupert's Namesake (1893)
- The Rainproof Invention (1896)
- The Search for Molly Marling (1903)
- The Trouble Man (1910)
- The Only Girl: A Tale of 1837 (1925)

=== Non-fiction ===
- Nova Scotia and New England During the Revolution (1904)
- A Canadian History for Boys and Girls (1905)
- Builders of the Dominion: Men of the East (1907)
- Old Quebec: The City of Champlain (1908)
- The Stories of the Counties of Ontario (1913)
- Canada and the British Immigrant (1914) A factual guide to immigrants.
