= Mazey =

Mazey is a surname shared by several notable people:

- Henry Mazey (died 1677), English educator and clergyman
- Israel Mazey (1812–1894), British seaman and pioneer of colonial South Australia
- Mary Ellen Mazey (born 1949), American academic of Bowling Green State University
- Randy Mazey (born 1966), American college baseball coach
- Sonia Mazey (born 1958), New Zealand academic and political scientist
