= Akim Samar =

Soviet poet and novelist

- Аким Дмитриевич Самар
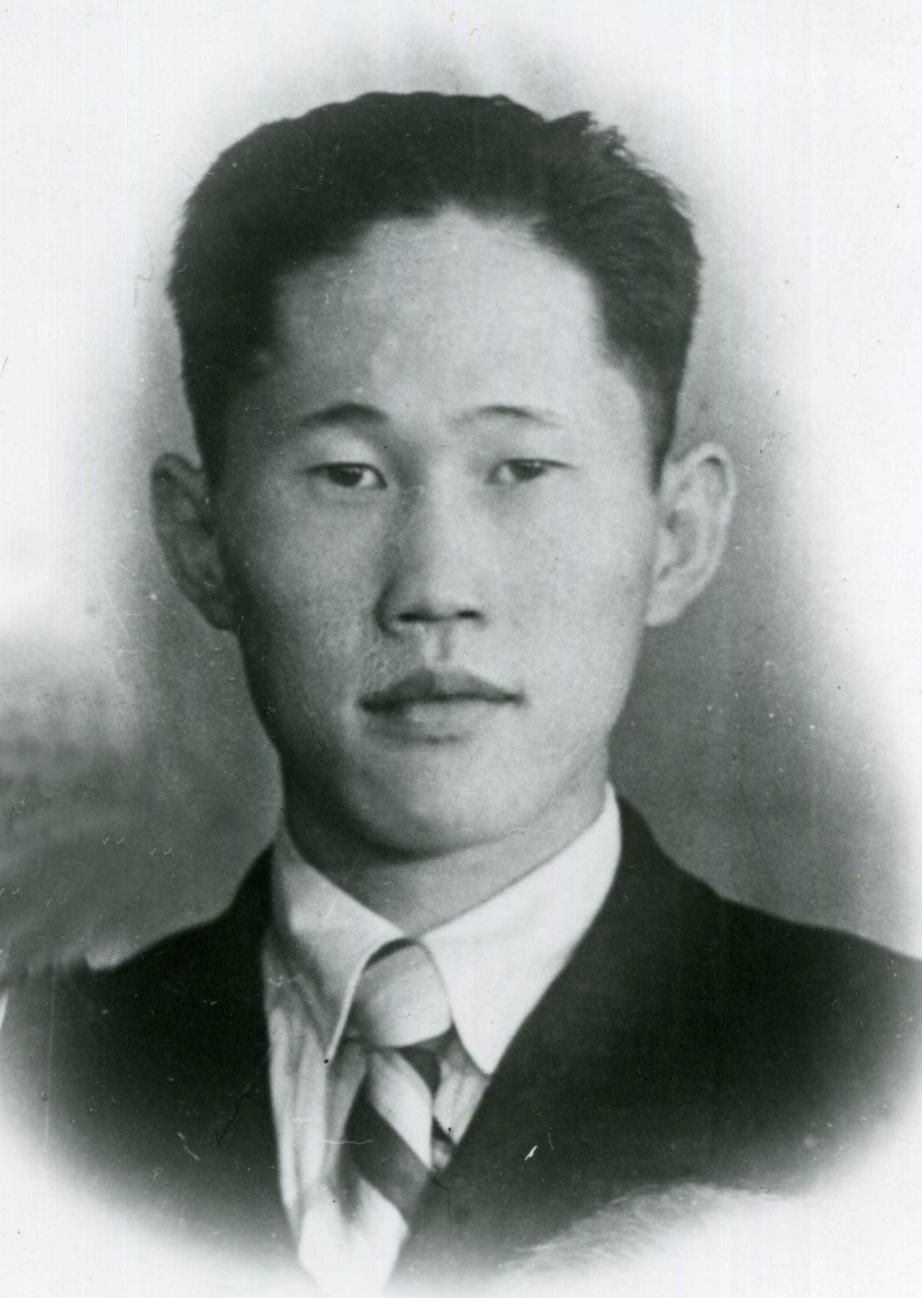
- Born: 1916; Russian Far East
- Died: 1943 (aged 26–27); Battle of Stalingrad
- Education: Institute of the Peoples of the North
- Occupations: Poet and novelist
- Writing career
- Language: Nanai
- Notable works: Songs of the Nanai, Poems, A Poor Man's Son

Akim Dmitriyevich Samar (Russian: Аки́м Дми́триевич Сама́р, 1916–1943) was a Soviet poet and novelist regarded as the first Nanai-language writer.

Born in the Russian Far East in 1916, Samar was a student at Institute of the Peoples of the North in Leningrad and joined the Red Army after Nazi Germany invaded the Soviet Union. He died at the Battle of Stalingrad in 1943. His works included the poetry collections Songs of the Nanai (1938) and Poems (1940) and the 1941 novel A Poor Man's Son.
