= Alberto Casañal Shakery =

Spanish poet, playwright, humorist and writer

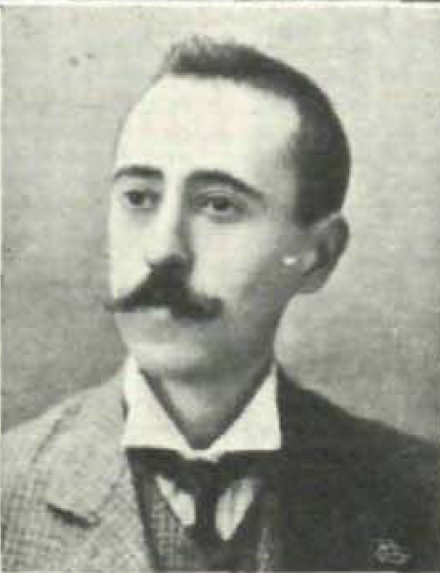
- Born: 22 June 1874; San Roque
- Died: 6 February 1943 (aged 68); Zaragoza
- Resting place: Torrero Cemetery
- Employer: Heraldo de Aragón
- Spouse(s): Josefa Serrano Herrera

Alberto Casañal Shakery (1875–1943) was a Spanish poet, playwright, humorist and writer.

A native of San Roque, Cádiz, he moved to Zaragoza as a child and lived there for the rest of his life. He graduated in Physics and Chemistry and was Professor of Mathematics at the Industrial School of Zaragoza. He began to compose verses in great abundance, particularly romances, and collected traditional Aragonese and Castilian songs and wrote numerous stories and short pieces of comic theater. His works were usually set in Aragon with strong regionalist flavor, sometimes in collaboration with his friend Pablo Parellada. He collaborated on the La Gran Vía, Barcelona Cómica, Pluma y Lápiz and other publications.

== Selected works ==
=== Theatre ===
- La tronada
- Angelistos al cielo
- Los tenderos
- La hora fatal
- Los chicos de los pobres
- La paga de alivio
- Los pícaros estudiantes
- Con Pablo Parellada, Historia cómica de Zaragoza, La justicia de Almudévar Recepción académica, Cambio de tren y El gay saber

=== Verses ===
- Fruslerías, versos, 1898
- Romances de ciego, 1910
- Versos de muchos colores, 1912
- Jotas, en colaboración con Sixto Celorrio, 1912
- Cantares baturros
- Fruta de Aragón. Versos Baturros
- Romance, Vida y Retrato De Ramón Laborda (El Chato)

=== Narrative ===
- Cuentos baturros, 1898, 1900
- Mostilladas, cuentos
- Una boda entre baturros, novela festiva en verso

=== Others ===
- Baturradas
- Más baturradas, 1903
- Nuevas baturradas. Monólogos y diálogos baturros
- Epistolarlo baturro
- Nuevo libro de los Enxemplos
- De Utebo a Zaragoza
- Gramática parda y otras picardías
