= David Vygodsky =

David Isaakovich Vygodsky (Russian: Дави́д Исаа́кович Вы́годский) (September 23, 1893 – 1943) was a Russian literary critic, linguist, translator, poet, and teacher.

Born in Gomel in the Russian Empire (now in Belarus) into a nonreligious Jewish family, Vygodsky was the cousin of the well-known developmental psychologist Lev Vygotsky, on whom he was an important influence. He graduated from the Romance and Germanic division of Saint Petersburg State University and became a translator and teacher; he translated from German (Johannes Becher), French (André Malraux), Hebrew (Chaim Bialik), and especially Spanish (Vicente Blasco Ibáñez, Benito Pérez Galdós, and others). At the time of the October Revolution and Civil War, he taught Latin and gave lectures on modern literature in Gomel, but in the 1920s, he moved to Petrograd. Zemlya (Land), a collection of his poetry, was published in 1922; the same year, his article "A Survey of New Jewish Poetry" appeared in the Petrograd journal Parfenon. He was close to the OPOYAZ group, and his apartment was a meeting place for writers and students of literature; "it may have been here that [Lev] Vygotsky first met members of the formalist school and the acmeic poet Mandel'shtam, one of his favorite poets." Marietta Shaginyan wrote this description:

In Leningrad, on Mokhovaya Street, there was a typical Leningrad apartment house ... and in a typical gloomy Leningrad apartment in this building lived the man who in the first years of the October Revolution discovered for the Soviet reader the wonderful poetry of Cuba. He appeared shy and very pleasant, and it was impossible not to love and respect him. He was very pale, thin, short, with eyes that were kind and as clear as those of children beneath unusually thick eyebrows that almost shaded them. The apartment had books everywhere, piled to the ceiling and covering the floors. And they weren't enough for him. You would wait for him for hours, and then he would come back from Liteiny Avenue, where in those days alluring secondhand bookshops crowded both sides of the avenue, hauling home with difficulty a bunch of new books. And those books were greedily unwrapped, opened, and read, when sometimes there was nothing to eat at home. This marvelous Leningrad booklover, known then as a Hispanist who knew many languages, was David Isaakovich Vygodsky, a name that was widely known across the ocean. Even today, books from South America arrive at his Leningrad address with touching inscriptions...

He was a friend of both Osip Mandelstam and Benedikt Livshits; the latter dedicated a sonnet to him.

He was arrested on February 14, 1938 (as part of a general purge of translators) and, despite an unusual and courageous campaign of support from such writers as Yury Tynyanov, Viktor Shklovsky, Konstantin Fedin, and Mikhail Zoshchenko, died in the Gulag.
