= Lore Berger =

Swiss writer

- Born: Lenore Berger; 17 December 1921; Basel, Switzerland
- Died: 14 August 1943 (aged 21); Basel-Stadt, Switzerland
- Education: University of Basel
- Occupations: Author, translator
- Writing career
- Language: German
- Notable works: Der barmherzige Hügel, 1943

Lore Berger (17 December 1921 – 14 August 1943) was a Swiss writer who committed suicide at the age of 21.

== Biography ==
Berger was born in Basel into a family of teachers. In 1939 she entered the University of Basel. During World War II served in the army. At that time she was diagnosed with anorexia nervosa. Her first novel, Der barmherzige Hügel, was written in 1943 for a literary competition. Lore Berger committed suicide on 14 August 1943 at the age of 21. Her book was published after her death. In 1981 the book was adapted by a German film director Beat Kuert into a movie Die Zeit ist böse.

== Notable works ==
- Der barmherzige Huegel : e. Geschichte gegen Thomas
- La tour sur la colline : histoire contre Thomas
- Der barmherzige Hügel Eine Geschichte gegen Thomas Ergänzt um Fragmente aus dem Journal intime der Autorin
- Rupf zieht aus und viele andere Geschichten von kleinen Leuten
- La collina misericordiosa : una storia contro Thomas
- Über die Aufnahme verschieden temperierten Wassers durch Ziegen bei Änderung der Umwelttemperatur
- Der barmherzige Hugel : Roman
