= Bernt Theodor Anker =

Norwegian priest and writer

Bernt Theodor Anker (7 March 1867 – 21 August 1943) was a Norwegian linguist, priest and author. Anker was one of the first priests to use Nynorsk from the pulpit, and was a strong proponent of Nynorsk in the church and in society.

He was born in Vestre Aker and grew up in Bergen and in Risør, where his father was the customs inspector from 1877. He attended the Latin school in Drammen during 1884. Anker finished his Cand.theol. at the University of Oslo in 1890, where he had studied theology, comparative studies, and politics. Anker worked as a priest and teacher throughout his professional life. He first served as a sexton in Arendal from 1890-93 followed be assignments as parish priest in Søndeled Municipality, Kviteseid Municipality, and Lårdal Municipality. He finished his career as provost of the Hardanger og Voss prosti in Hordaland county.

Theologically, he was strongly influenced by the writing of N. F. S. Grundtvig and became involved in Grundtvigianism. He was also active in youth work throughout his life. He translated four historical books and four prophetical books of the Old Testament for the first translation of the Holy Bible into Nynorsk in 1921. One of his hymns appears in Norsk Salmebok, the hymnal of the Church of Norway.

== Selected works ==
- Elskhug og giftarmaal. Ungdomsforedrag, Voss 1907
- Aandsmagti i Blix-salmarne. Ungdoms-foredrag, 1909
- Den rike ungguten. Ungdomspreika, Kongsberg 1911
- Kristendomskunnskapen i det tjugande aarhundradet. Eit foredrag for lærarar, 1911
- Ljos og varme i kristendomen. Sju preikor for norsk ungdom, 1913
- Kva krev vaar tid av ungdomen? Foredrag, Risør 1913
- Martin Luther, Norske Folkeskrifter nr. 66, 1917
- Bibelen for barn. Barnepreiker, 3 bind., 1938–40
- Frå kristenliv i Risør i 70- og 80-åri, Risør 1938
- Nokre ungdoms-minne frå 80- og 90-åri, 1939
- Ungdomsprest og ungdomslærar. Minne frå flytt og flakk i tjuge år 1893–1914, 1942
- Morosame småstubbar med ålvor iblandt, frå eldre og nyare tider, Lofthus 1943
- Prest og prost i Hardanger. Minne frå tri og tjuge år 1914–1937, 1945
