= Leon Mazy =

Leon Maximilien Joseph Mazy (December 30, 1860 – March 20, 1938) was a fresco painter born in Malonne, County of Namur, Belgium.

Mazy invented Cameo-Cement, an inexpensive method of artistically embellishing cement surfaces.

In 1911, Mazy developed his own 5 acre orchard 2 miles southeast of Van Nuys. The orchard consisted of Cure pears from France, cherries and apples from Belgium, a cherry-plum tree from Hungary, apricots, figs, grapes, nectarines, olives, persimmons, peaches, prunes, plums quinces, almonds, chestnuts, pecans, and walnuts. The property was later sold to C. R. Hunter.

In 1928, Mazy painted the exterior of the Carthay Circle Theater using a "new Southern California product, Sterling bonding cement paint, manufactured by West Coast Kalsomine Company".

Leon Mazy and his brother, Emil Mazy, operated the Westlake Art Studio.
