= Emanuel Bachrach-Barée =

German painter

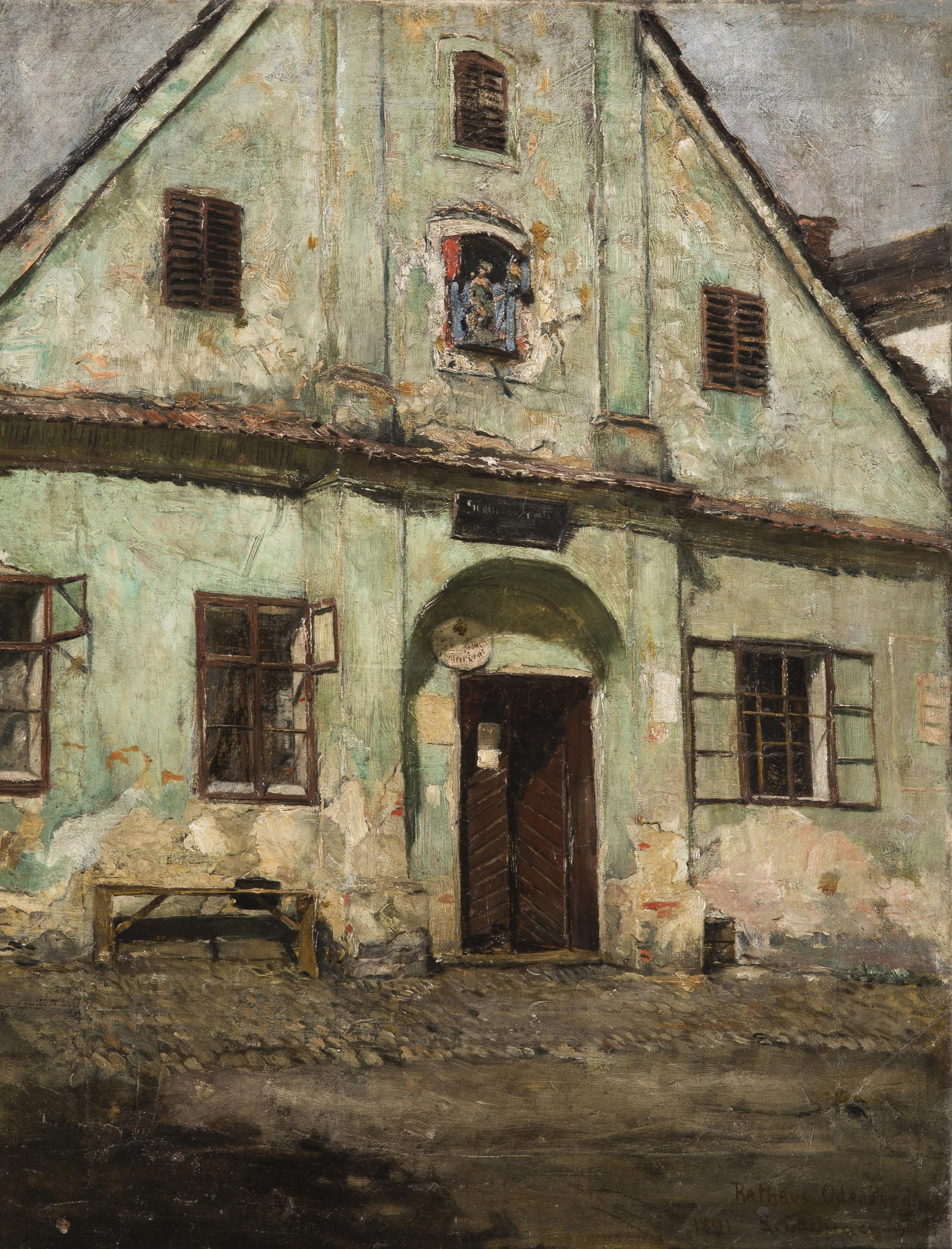
- Town Hall in Oderberg (1891)
- Born: 11 April 1863; Oderberg, Austrian Silesia
- Died: 20 April 1943 (aged 80); Munich, Germany
- Known for: Painting
- Movement: Realism

Emanuel Bachrach-Barée (11 April 1863 – 20 April 1943) was a German painter.

== Life ==
Bachrach-Barée was born in Oderberg in Austrian Silesia to Jewish parents, the miller and merchant Philipp Israel Bachrach (1818–1892) and his wife Helena née Kremser (1837–1921).

He was a self-taught artist. In 1885 he settled in Munich. From 1890 his paintings were represented in the Glaspalast. He was associated with the Luitpold-Gruppe (see the Munich Secession), a group of artists that stood for moderately modern aspirations with high artistic quality. Occasionally he also exhibited in Berlin, e.g. at the International Art Exhibition of 1891 and the Grand Art Exhibition of 1893. Bachrach-Barée also worked as an illustrator for German newspapers.

Into old age, he worked with unbroken creativity. In the years 1931 and 1932 his paintings were still on display at the art exhibitions of the Deutsches Museum in Munich. Because of his Jewish origin, in 1936 the Nazi authorities banned him from working, and forbad sales of his paintings.

Bachrach-Barée died in Munich in 1943.

Both his sons, Hellmut Bachrach-Barée (Munich, 1898–1969) and Hans Bachrach (Munich, 1900–1958), were painters.

== See also ==
- List of German painters
