= Mankumari Basu =

Bengali poet

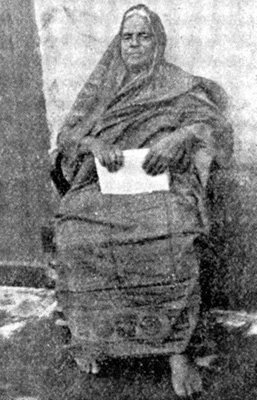
- Mankumari Basu.
- Born: 25 January 1863; Sagardanri Jessore, Bengal Presidency
- Died: 26 December 1943 (Age 80); Khulna, Bengal Presidency
- Occupations: Poet and short story writer
- Spouse: Bidhushankar Basu (Husband)
- Children: Priyabala
- Parents: Anandamohan Dutta (father); Shantamoni Devi (mother)
- Awards: Kuntanil Award; Bhumanmohini Gold Medal; Jagattarini Gold Medal

Mankumari Basu (Bengali: মানকুমারী বসু)(25 January 1863 - 26 December 1943) a popular Bengali poet and short story writer.

== Works ==
- Kusumanjali (With The Floral bucket) (1893)
- Kanakanjali (With The Golden bucket) (1896)
- Priyaprasanga (About My Beloved) (1884)
- Harano Pranay (The Lost Love) (1884)
