= Emil Mazy =

Belgian-American painter

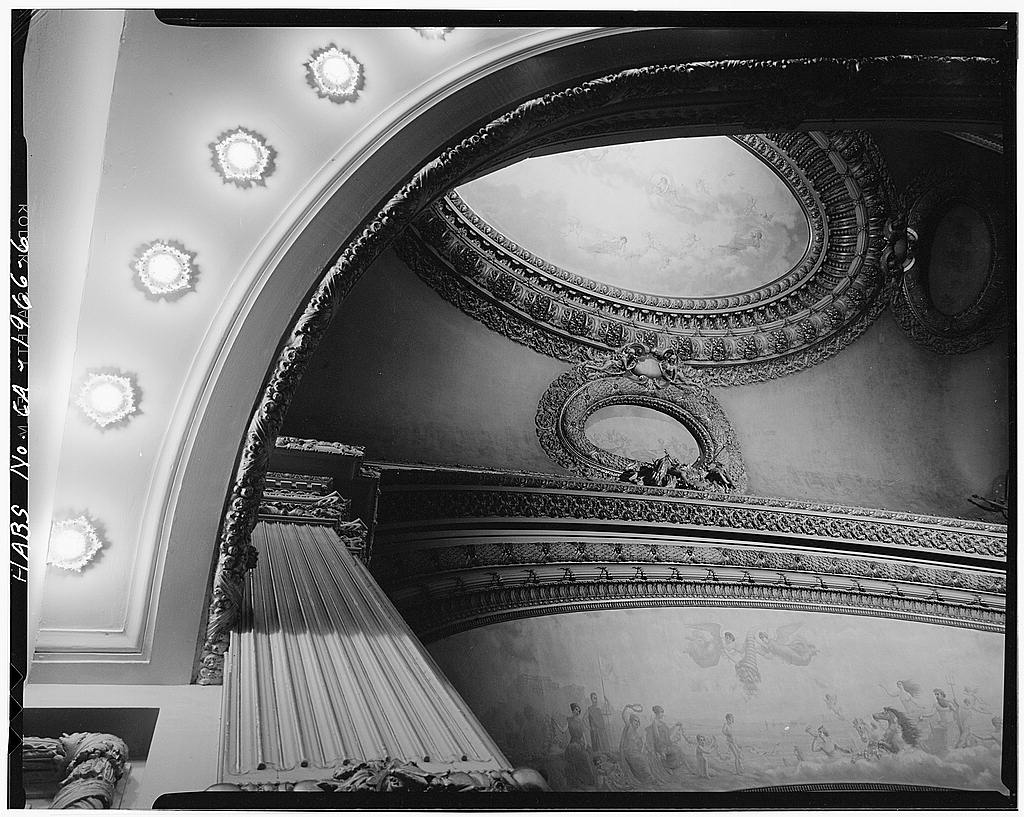
Paintings by Emil T. Mazy on the proscenium (arch over the stage) in the Spreckels Theater Building, San Diego, California

Emil Tissot Mazy (December 27, 1865 – June 6, 1943) was a California artist born in Rosée, Namur, Belgium.

Perhaps the most widely viewed and referenced paintings still in existence today by Emil T. Mazy are those found on the proscenium and ceilings of the Spreckels Theater in San Diego, California, a building recognized in the National Register of Historic Places. The murals, as described by the Spreckels Theater website, feature "...two angels sprinkling a horn-of-plenty and Neptune bringing San Diego the riches of the ocean."

== Artistic career ==
=== Education ===
Emil attended school at Académie Royale des Beaux-Arts in Brussels, Belgium. A 1905 Los Angeles Times article erroneously claimed to the contrary that Emil was a graduate of École des Beaux-Arts. The same article also erroneously claimed that Emil was a Frenchman, and such an inference about his education would be plausible if he were believed to be from France. Emil was from Belgium. The Wikipedia article: Académie Royale des Beaux-Arts indicates that these two schools are often confused and well supports this conjecture.

=== Art Instructor ===
In 1904 Emil took employment as an instructor at the Los Angeles School of Art and Design in MacArthur Park (then Westlake Park). The school, located at 624 S Alvarado Street and overlooking Westlake Park, was originally called the Westlake Art Studios School and was both founded and managed by Mrs. Carolyn Wood. In Edan Milton Hughes's book Artists in California under the biographical entry for Leon Mazy it states "With his brother Emil, he operated the Westlake Art Studio." It is unclear whether "Westlake Art Studio" and "Westlake Art Studio Schools", though of the same location, were the same or different entities. If the same entity then the statements about Mrs. Carolyn Wood and Leon and Emil Mazy may conflict. Two months after becoming a design instructor at the school, Emil showed his interior designs at the school's Pallette Club.

=== The Vatican ===
At the age of 68 the well seasoned Emil T. Mazy received accolades from Pope Pius XI in Vatican City. Emil had painted a portrait of Father P. Gratianus de Schepper of Belgium. Of note was the fact Father de Schepper paid Emil a two-hour visit in Los Angeles and from that visit Emil later painted the portrait by memory. While a possible inference from though not stated in the article, it is not known if this painting became or is a holding of Vatican Museums.

=== Decoration ===
On April 7, 1939, Emil T. Mazy was named Chevalier in the Order of Leopold II

== Chronology ==
This section may be deleted once the sorting of facts for clarity no longer serves its purpose.

- Census Year: 1900; Census Place: Bronx, New York, New York; Roll: T623_1125; Page: 11B; Enumeration District: 982; Occupation: "Painter".
- 1902-01-02: Taken from the California Birth Index, Emil's son George is born in Los Angeles.
- 1904: LA Times Article states Emil took employment at the Westlake School of Art and Design.
- Census Year: 1910; Census Place: Los Angeles Assembly District 74, Los Angeles, California; Roll: T624_84; Page: 14B; Enumeration District: 74; Occupation: "Artist, General".
- 1911: American Art Directory lists Emil as an Instructor at Los Angeles School of Art and Design.
- Census Year: 1920; Census Place: Town of Rye, Mamaroneck, Westchester, New York; Roll: T625_1278; Page: 7A; Enumeration District: 164; Occupation: "Artist, Studio".
- Census Year: 1930; Census Place: Los Angeles, Los Angeles, California; Roll: 132; Page: 30B; Enumeration District: 13; Occupation: "Artist, Public School".

== Family history ==
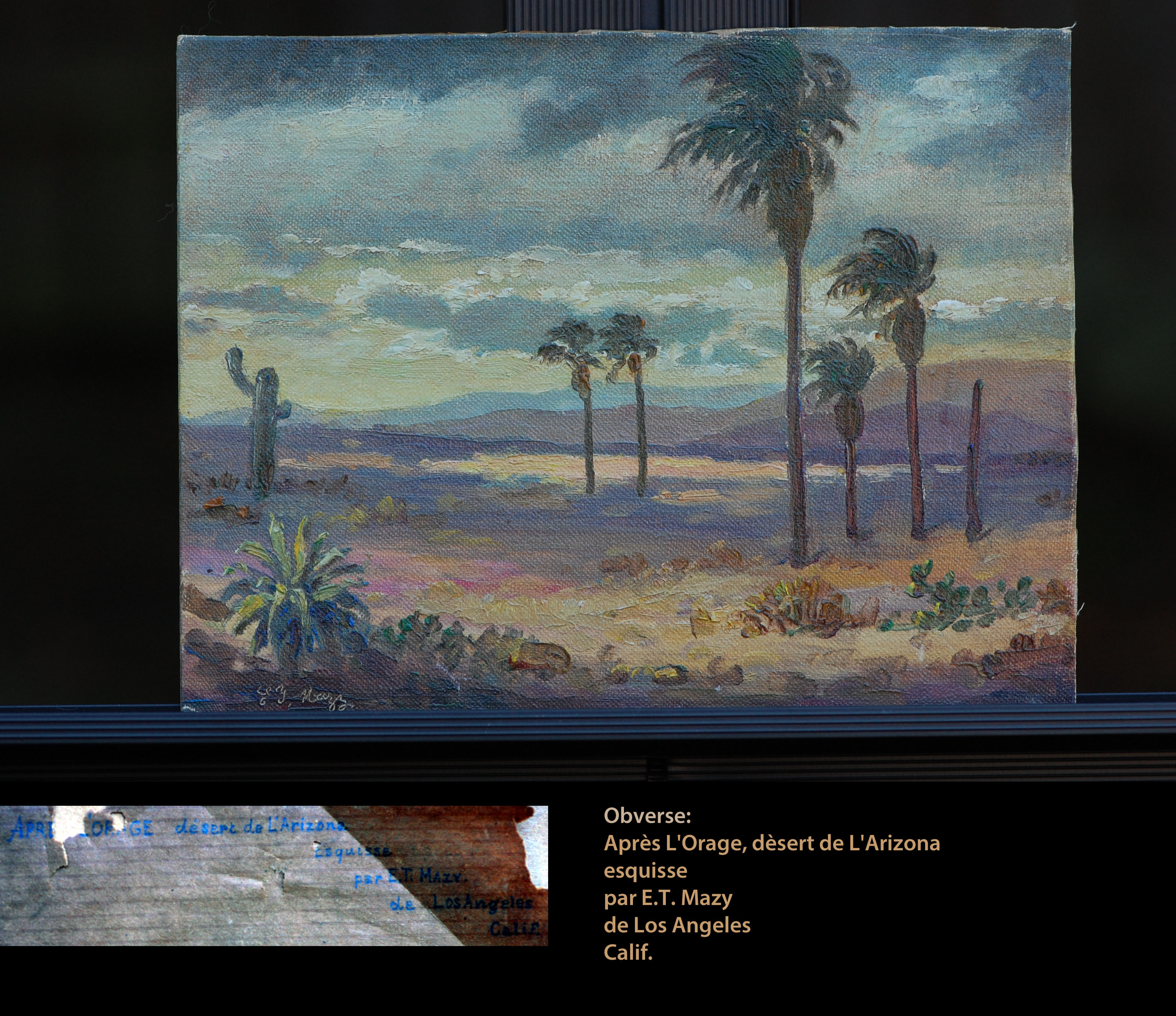
Après L'Orage, dèsert de L'Arizona, esquisse, par E.T. Mazy de Los Angeles, Calif.

Emil first arrived in the United States at the port of New York, New York on September 30, 1897. He departed from Antwerp, Belgium aboard the Red Star Line ship Noordland. Along with him was his wife Jeanne Catherine Mazy née Verdoodt (July 8, 1868 — June 2, 1940), three daughters (Marie, Lucien, Gabriella), and one son (Frederic).

Emil and Jeanne were married on April 24, 1889 in Brussels, Belgium.

Emil was naturalized as a United States citizen on November 11, 1932 at the age of 66. He signed his name at that time with the spelling Emile Tissot Mazy.

Emil is the son of Maximilien Joseph Mazy (November 8, 1812 — ) and Adrienne Tissot.

Known siblings of Emil are his brother Leon Mazy (December 30, 1860 — March 20, 1938), an artist and inventor, and sister Elise Marie Joseph Mazy (May 24, 1858 — ).

The Mazy family moved to Los Angeles between June 6, 1900, the 1900 US Census date, and January 2, 1902, the birth of Emil's first child in Los Angeles, George Leon Mazy (January 2, 1902 — June 13, 1992).
